= List of churches in Wrexham County Borough =

This is a list of churches in the Wrexham County Borough area of North Wales. This list extends some distance from the city of Wrexham itself.

== Active churches ==
Name	Community (settlement)	Dedication	Web	Founded	Denomination	Benefice	Notes
St Dunawd, Bangor-on-Dee	Bangor Is-y-coed	Dunod		Medieval	Church in Wales	Maelor Mission Area	
Bangor-on-Dee Presbyterian Church	Bangor Is-y-coed			1867	Presbyterian		
Holy Trinity, Bronington	Bronington	Trinity		1836	Church in Wales	Maelor Mission Area	Barn converted to church
St Mary, Whitewell	Bronington (Whitewell)	Mary		Medieval	Church of England	Marbury, Tushingham, Whitewell	Rebuilt 1830
St Paul, Pentre Broughton	Broughton	Paul		1888	Church in Wales	Alyn Mission Area	
All Saints, Southsea	Broughton (Southsea)	All Saints		1884	Church in Wales	Alyn Mission Area	New buildings 1926, 1984 (newest was church hall)
St Mary, Brymbo	Brymbo	Mary		1871-1872	Church in Wales	Alyn Mission Area	
Brymbo Methodist Church	Brymbo				Methodist	Wrexham Circuit	
Christ Church, Bwlchgwyn	Brymbo (Bwlchgwyn)	Jesus		1877	Church in Wales	Alyn Mission Area 1961 The Church of Jesus Christ of Latter-day Saints	Acton Park, Wrexham
Capel Bethania, Acrefair	Cefn (Acrefair)	Bethany			Baptist Union		
Capel Seion a'r Tabernacl, Cefn Mawr	Cefn (Cefn Mawr)	Zion, Tabernacle			Baptist Union		
St John, Rhosymedre	Cefn (Rhosymedre)	John the Evangelist		1837	Church in Wales	Offa Mission Area	
Rhosymedre Methodist Church	Cefn (Rhosymedre)				Methodist	Wrexham Circuit	
St Garmon, Llanarmon Dyffryn Ceiriog	Ceiriog Ucha (Llanarmon Dyffryn Ceiriog)	Germanus of Auxerre		pre-C19th	Church in Wales	Llansanffraid, Llanarmon, Pontfadog	Rebuilt 1845
Llanarmon Methodist Church	Ceiriog Ucha (Llanarmon Dyffryn Ceiriog)				Methodist	Cymru	
Capel Tabernacl, Llanarmon Dyffryn Ceir.	Ceiriog Ucha (Llanarmon Dyffryn Ceiriog)	Tabernacle			Presbyterian		
St Mary, Chirk	Chirk	Mary		Medieval	Church in Wales	Offa Mission Area	
Sacred Heart of Jesus, Chirk	Chirk	Sacred Heart		1905	Roman Catholic	Parish of St Richard Gwyn	Current building 1928-1929
Chirk Methodist Church	Chirk				Methodist	Shropshire & Marches Circuit	
Capel Bethesda, Chirk	Chirk	Pool of Bethesda			Presbyterian		
St Tydfil, Coedpoeth	Coedpoeth	Tydfil		1875	Church in Wales	Alyn Mission Area	Current building 1895. Facing closure
Holy Family, Coedpoeth	Coedpoeth	Holy Family			Roman Catholic	Wrexham Cathedral	Building 1991
Capel Disgwylfa, Coedpoeth	Coedpoeth				Presbyterian		
Coedpoeth Salvation Army	Coedpoeth				Salvation Army		Shares building with Catholics since 2004
Coedpoeth Evangelical Free Church	Coedpoeth			1954	Independent		Began in Brynteg as Rockwood Mission
St Hilary, Erbistock	Erbistock	Hilary ?		Medieval	Church in Wales	Maelor Mission Area	Rebuilt 1860-1861
St Deiniol, Eyton	Erbistock (Eyton)	Deiniol			Church in Wales	Maelor Mission Area	
St Mary, Bersham	Esclusham (Bersham)	Mary		1873-1876	Church in Wales	Wrexham Mission Area	
Holy Trinity, Esclusham	Esclusham (Rhostyllen)	Trinity		1876-1877	Church in Wales	Wrexham Mission Area	
Tabernacl Presbyterian Church, Rhostyllen	Esclusham (Rhostyllen)	Tabernacle			Presbyterian		
Capel Ainon, Dolywern	Glyntraian (Dolywern)	Ænon			Baptist Union		
St John the Baptist, Pontfadog	Glyntraian (Pontfadog)	John the Baptist		1847	Church in Wales	Llansanffraid, Llanarmon, Pontfadog	
All Saints, Gresford	Gresford	All Saints		Medieval	Church in Wales	Alyn Mission Area	
Gresford Methodist Church	Gresford				Methodist	Wrexham Circuit	
Holy Trinity, Gwersyllt	Gwersyllt	Trinity		1850-1851	Church in Wales	Alyn Mission Area	
Gwersyllt Congregational Church	Gwersyllt				EFCC-FIEC-AECW		
Ffrwd Methodist Church	Gwersyllt (Windy Hill)				Methodist	Wrexham Circuit	
St Chad, Hanmer	Hanmer	Chad of Mercia		Medieval	Church in Wales	Maelor Mission Area	
St Chad, Holt	Holt	Chad of Mercia		Medieval	Church in Wales	Alyn Mission Area	
St Paul, Isycoed	Isycoed	Paul		pre-C19th	Church in Wales	Alyn Mission Area	Rebuilt 1829
St David, Froncysyllte	Llangollen Rural (Froncysyllte)	David of Wales		1871	Church in Wales	Offa Mission Area	
Trevor Parish Church	Llangollen Rural (Trevor)	Unknown		1772	Church in Wales	Llangollen, Trevor, Llantysilio	
St Ffraid, Glyn Ceiriog	Llansanffraid Glyn Ceiriog	Brigid of Kildare		pre-C18th	Church in Wales	Llansantffraid, Llanarmon, Pontfadog	Rebuilt 1790
Capel Seion, Glyn Ceiriog	Llansanffraid Glyn Ceiriog	Zion			Baptist Union		
Capel Soar, Glyn Ceiriog	Llansanffraid Glyn Ceiriog	Zoara			Presbyterian		
St Martin, Llay	Llay	Martin of Tours		1923-1925	Church in Wales	Alyn Mission Area	First CiW church built following disestablishment
St Francis of Assisi, Llay	Llay	Francis of Assisi			Roman Catholic	Llay & Rossett	
Llay Baptist Church	Llay				Baptist Union GB		
Llay Community Church of the Nazarene	Llay				Nazarene		
St John the Baptist, Bettisfield	Maelor South (Bettisfield)	John the Baptist		1851	Church in Wales	Maelor Mission Area	New building 1873-1874
Bettisfield Methodist Chapel	Maelor South (Bettisfield)				Methodist	Shropshire & Marches Circuit	
St Mary Magdalene, Penley	Maelor South (Penley)	Mary Magdalene		pre-C19th	Church in Wales	Maelor Mission Area	Rebuilt 1899-1901
SS Deiniol & Marcella, Marchwiel	Marchwiel	Deiniol & Marcella		pre-C18th	Church in Wales	Maelor Mission Area	Rebuilt 1778
St Mary, Minera	Minera	Mary		C17th	Church in Wales	Alyn Mission Area	Rebuilt 1865-1866
St Mary the Virgin, Overton-on-Dee	Overton	Mary			Church in Wales	Maelor Mission Area	
Our Lady & the Welsh Martyrs, Overton	Overton	Mary & Welsh Martyrs		1958	Roman Catholic	Wrexham Maelor	Congregation probably older
Overton Methodist Church	Overton				Methodist	Wrexham Circuit	
Knolton Methodist Church	Overton (Knolton)				Methodist	Shropshire & Marches Circuit	
St Thomas, Penycae	Penycae	Thomas		1877-1878	Church in Wales	Offa Mission Area	
Capel Salem, Penycae	Penycae	Jerusalem			Baptist Union		
Zion English Baptist Church, Penycae	Penycae				FIEC		
Penycae Neighbourhood Church of the Nazarene	Penycae				Nazarene		
Bethel Chapel	Rhosllanerchrugog			1840			Independent. Bilingual
St David, Rhosllanerchrugog	Rhosllanerchrugog	David of Wales		1878	Church in Wales	Offa Mission Area	Bilingual. Current building 1892, previously iron church
Capel Mawr, Rhosllanerchrugog	Rhosllanerchrugog				Presbyterian		
Rhosllanerchrugog Salvation Army	Rhosllanerchrugog				Salvation Army		
St Mary, Johnstown	Rhosllanerchrugog (Johnstown)	Mary		1893	Church in Wales	Offa Mission Area	Building 1928, previously used iron church from Rhos
Mount Pleasant Baptist Church	Rhosllanerchrugog (Ponciau)				Baptist Union GB		
Capel Penuel, Rhosllanerchrugog	Rhosllanerchrugog (Ponciau)				Baptist Union		
Capel Bethel, Ponciau	Rhosllanerchrugog (Ponciau)	Bethel			Presbyterian		
Christ Church, Rossett	Rossett	Jesus		C17th	Church in Wales	Alyn Mission Area	New church 1841. Present church 1891-1892
Christ the King, Rossett	Rossett	Jesus			Roman Catholic	Llay & Rossett	
Rossett Presbyterian Church	Rossett				Presbyterian		
Darland Evangelical Church	Rossett				Independent		
St Mary, Ruabon	Ruabon	Mary		Medieval	Church in Wales	Offa Mission Area	Shared church with Catholics (see below) since 1980
St Mary the Virgin, Ruabon	Ruabon	Mary		1950s	Roman Catholic	Parish of St Richard Gwyn	First building (St Michael's) 1957, unsafe 1977. Building shared w CoE
Ruabon Methodist Church	Ruabon				Methodist	Wrexham Circuit	
All Saints, Pen-y-lan	Ruabon (Bryn Pen-y-lan)	All Saints		1887-1889	Church in Wales	Offa Mission Area	Originally a private chapel
St Deiniol, Worthenbury	Willington Worthenbury	Deiniol		1736-1739	Church in Wales	Maelor Mission Area	One of the finest Georgian churches in the country
Tallarn Green Methodist Church	Willington Worthenbury (Tallarn Green)				Methodist	Cheshire South Circuit	
Capel Jerwsalem, Wrexham	Wrexham Acton				Methodist	Cymru	
Capel y Groes, Wrexham	Wrexham Acton	Cross		1981-1982	Presbyterian		Replaced Capel Seion, demolished 1979
ChristChurch Wrexham	Wrexham Acton			1995	Ichthus		Meets in Acton Community Centre
Borras Park Evangelical Church	Wrexham Acton (Borras Park)			1971	AECW		
St John, Rhosnesni	Wrexham Acton (Rhosnesni)	John ?		1894	Church in Wales	Wrexham Mission Area	Current building 1974
St Mark, Caia Park	Wrexham Caia Park	Mark		1961	Church in Wales	Wrexham Mission Area	
St Anne, Caia Park	Wrexham Caia Park	Anne		1962	Roman Catholic	Wrexham Maelor	Congregation probably older
Rock Chapel, Caia Park	Wrexham Caia Park			c. 2015	Assemblies of God		
St Giles, Wrexham	Wrexham Offa	Giles		Medieval	Church in Wales	Wrexham Mission Area	
All Saints, Wrexham	Wrexham Offa	All Saints		1910-1912	Church in Wales	Wrexham Mission Area	
Our Lady of Sorrows Cathedral, Wrexham	Wrexham Offa	Mary		1857	Roman Catholic	Wrexham Cathedral	Pro-cathedral 1898, cathedral of Wrexham Diocese 1987
Capel Penybryn, Wrexham	Wrexham Offa				Baptist Union		
Regent Street Methodist Church	Wrexham Offa				Methodist	Wrexham Circuit	
Salisbury Park United Reformed Church	Wrexham Offa				URC		
Bradley Road Evangelical Baptist Church	Wrexham Offa				FIEC		
Wrexham Seventh-Day Adventist Church	Wrexham Offa				7th-Day Adventist		
St James, Rhosddu	Wrexham Rhosddu	James		1874	Church in Wales	Wrexham Mission Area	Parish church 1886
Chester Street Baptist Church	Wrexham Rhosddu				Baptist Union GB		
Rhosddu Methodist Church	Wrexham Rhosddu				Methodist	Wrexham Circuit	
Trinity Presbyterian Church, Wrexham	Wrexham Rhosddu	Trinity		1908	Presbyterian		
Wrexham Salvation Army	Wrexham Rhosddu				Salvation Army		
Gateway Church Wrexham	Wrexham Rhosddu			2005	Newfrontiers		Meets on Glyndwr University campus
Wrexham Community Church	Wrexham Rhosddu			1987	Independent		
St Margaret, Garden Village	Wrexham Rhosddu (Garden Village)	Margaret the Virgin		1927-1928	Church in Wales	Wrexham Mission Area	
Bethel Presbyt. Church, Garden Village	Wrexham Rhosddu (Garden Village)	Bethel			Presbyterian		

There is also one Welsh speaking church in Weston Rhyn, Shropshire, another in Chester, another in Birkenhead, two in Liverpool, one in Altrincham and one in Manchester, and the Welsh Presbyterian Church has an English-speaking church in Chester, two on the Wirral and one in Liverpool.

== Defunct churches ==
Name	Community (settlement)	Dedication	Web	Founded	Redundant	Denomination	Notes
St Peter, Brynteg	Broughton (Brynteg)	Peter		1895	2006	Church in Wales	
St Paul, Berse Drelincourt	Broughton (New Broughton)	Paul		1742		Church in Wales	Converted to house 2010
St John, Brymbo	Brymbo	John ?		1837	1974	Church in Wales	Unstable 1870s, rebuilt 1891. Welsh church (St Mary's English). Demolished
St Alban, Tanyfron	Brymbo (Tanyfron)	Alban		1896-1897	2010	Church in Wales	
Halton Mission Church	Chirk (Halton)			1878	pre-1998	Church in Wales	Converted to house c1998
St Peter, Rhosrobin	Gwersyllt (Rhosrobin)	Peter		1881		Church in Wales	Rebuilt 1898. Now a vet surgery
St John the Evangelist, Rhosllanerchrugog	Rhosllanerchrugog	John the Evangelist		1852-1853	2005	Church in Wales	Conversion to residential use beginning 2016
St Mary Magdalene, Tallarn Green	Willington Worthenbury (Tallarn Green)	Mary Magdalene		1851	2007	Church in Wales	Rebuilt 1872-1873
St Peter, Wrexham	Wrexham Caia Park	Peter		1910	C20th	Church in Wales	Now a warehouse
St Mark, Wrexham	Wrexham Offa	Mark		1856-1858	1956	Church in Wales	Demolished
St John the Baptist, Wrexham	Wrexham Offa	John the Baptist		1909	1998	Church in Wales	Demolished
St David, Wrexham	Wrexham Rhosddu	David of Wales		1889-1890		Church in Wales	Services in Welsh. Demolished
