= Grade II* listed buildings in Wrexham County Borough =

Wrexham County Borough shown within Wales

In the United Kingdom, the term listed building refers to a building or other structure officially designated as being of special architectural, historical, or cultural significance; Grade II* structures are those considered to be "particularly important buildings of more than special interest". Listing was begun by a provision in the Town and Country Planning Act 1947. Once listed, strict limitations are imposed on the modifications allowed to a building's structure or fittings. In Wales, the authority for listing under the Planning (Listed Buildings and Conservation Areas) Act 1990 rests with Cadw.

== Buildings ==
Name	Location Grid Ref. (Note: Sometimes known as OSGB36, the grid reference is based on the British national grid reference system used by the Ordnance Survey.) Geo-coordinates	Date Listed	Function	Notes	Reference Number	Image
Brynkinallt Hall	Chirk; SJ3031237867; 52°56′01″N 3°02′18″W	20 October 1952	Hall	The Brynkinallt Estate lies to the E of Chirk town, and straddles the national boundary.	599	See more images
Dolwen	Ceiriog Ucha; SJ1443633896; 52°53′45″N 3°16′24″W	20 October 1952	House	Located off a lane which runs W from the main crossroads in Llanarmon Dyffryn Ceiriog, following the River Ceiriog. The house is in a fine position on the N bank of the river with the hills rising behind. The front faces S.	602	Upload Photo
Chirk Aqueduct (continued into England)	Chirk; SJ2869937277; 52°55′41″N 3°03′44″W	1 April 1966	Aqueduct	The aqueduct straddles the Ceiriog Valley, approximately 55m SW of the parish church, and can be reached by a footpath from Castle Road. The aqueduct passes into England (Weston Rhyn) at its S end.	618	See more images
Railway Viaduct over River Dee	Cefn; SJ2852441231; 52°57′49″N 3°03′56″W	1 April 1966	Viaduct	Carries the railway over the River Dee between Newbridge and Cefn-Bychan	619	See more images
Cefn (Newbridge) Viaduct (partly in Cefn Community)	Chirk; SJ2853641173; 52°57′47″N 3°03′55″W	1 April 1966	Viaduct	The viaduct carries the railway across the wide valley of the River Dee between Newbridge and Cefn-bychan.	628	See more images
Queen Anne's Cottage	Chirk; SJ2874639985; 52°57′09″N 3°03′43″W	12 March 1973	Cottage	The cottage is located within Whitehurst Gardens, which are accessed directly from the A5 200m N of the roundabout at the N end of Chirk.	1288	Upload Photo
Trevalyn Hall (including former lodge)	Rossett; SJ3649856798; 53°06′17″N 2°57′00″W	6 September 1952	Hall	Situated in its own grounds set back, and to the south-east, of the Chester Road (B5102)	1528	See more images
Rossett Mill	Rossett; SJ3646257035; 53°06′24″N 2°57′02″W	6 September 1952	Mill	Situated slightly back from the north-west of the B 5102 Chester Road and to the north of the main village of Rossett. Stands in its own grounds with new stable developments to the rear south of the Alyn Bridge.	1530	See more images
Manley Hall, Erbistock	Erbistock; SJ3498341505; 52°58′01″N 2°58′10″W	6 September 1952	Hall	Situated 600m NW of Erbistock reached from a track running SE off the A539.	1531	Upload Photo
Esclusham Hall	Esclusham; SJ2955748102; 53°01′32″N 3°03′06″W	6 September 1952	Hall	Between the B5097 and the B5426 at Talwrn, S of the reservoir associated with the Legacy Waterworks.	1534	Upload Photo
Borras Hall	Holt; SJ3712152590; 53°04′01″N 2°56′23″W	6 July 1963	House	Situated 0.5km N off the A534 on the by-road which runs N to Gresford.	1563	Borras Hall
Borras Head	Holt; SJ3670953256; 53°04′22″N 2°56′46″W	6 July 1963	House	Situated to the S of Borras Road, just before the turning for the by-road which runs from the A534 to Gresford.	1565	Upload Photo
Berse vicarage with flanking walls to garden, Berse Drelincourt	Broughton; SJ3160750856; 53°03′02″N 3°01′18″W	6 July 1963	Vicarage	Set back from Berse Road down a drive opposite Berse Drelincourt Church.	1567	Upload Photo
Dovecote at Erbistock Hall	Erbistock; SJ3512042438; 52°58′31″N 2°58′04″W	6 July 1963	Dovecote	Circular brick dovecote dated 1737.	1578	Upload Photo
The Groves (also known as Grove Farm), Erbistock	Erbistock; SJ3595041999; 52°58′17″N 2°57′19″W	6 July 1963	Farmhouse	Situated at the end of a track running E off a by-road which runs S off the A528 to Erbistock.	1580	The Groves (also known as Grove Farm), Erbistock
Manor Farmhouse, (also known as Eyton Manor Farmhouse), Eyton	Erbistock; SJ3547344440; 52°59′36″N 2°57′46″W	6 July 1963	Farmhouse	Situated on the W side of the A528 N of Overton Bridge.	1581	Upload Photo
Stable Courtyard Range	Marchwiel; SJ3260248158; 53°01′35″N 3°00′23″W	6 July 1963	Stables	Situated immediately to the S of the kitchen block at Erddig.	1584	Upload Photo
Octagonal Building at Bersham Ironworks Site	Esclusham; SJ3071949234; 53°02′09″N 3°02′05″W	6 July 1963	Ironworks	In the centre of Bersham Village, towards the E end of the Ironworks site.	1586	Octagonal Building at Bersham Ironworks Site
Hafod-y-Bwch Hall	Esclusham; SJ3100847863; 53°01′25″N 3°01′48″W	6 July 1963	Hall	Between the A483 and the B5605, and approached via a drive from the B5605 immediately W of the roundabout at Croesfoel.	1587	Upload Photo
Esless Hall	Esclusham; SJ3190949259; 53°02′11″N 3°01′01″W	6 July 1963	Hall	Set back down a drive on the NE side of the Old Hall Farm estate on the E side of Rhostyllen, and above the River Clywedog.	1590	Upload Photo
Holt Castle	Holt; SJ4113053770; 53°04′41″N 2°52′49″W	6 July 1963	Castle	Situated at the end of a path to the S side of Deeside. The castle remains are situated on a sandstone boss around which a quarry was later dug out.	1595	See more images
Church of Saints Marcella and Deiniol, Marchwiel	Marchwiel; SJ3572547723; 53°01′23″N 2°57′35″W	6 July 1963	Church	Situated in the centre of the village set back from the road in a rectangular churchyard.	1614	See more images
Wynn Hall	Penycae; SJ2902044808; 52°59′45″N 3°03′32″W	6 July 1963	Country house	On the corner of the B5097 Ruabon road and Plas Bennion Road, at the SE end of the village.	1620	Wynn Hall
Plas Newydd, Ruabon	Ruabon; SJ2991843866; 52°59′15″N 3°02′44″W	6 July 1963		Situated off Pont Adam to the NW of the town centre.	1626	Upload Photo
Wynnstay Hall	Ruabon; SJ3088542607; 52°58′35″N 3°01′51″W	6 July 1963	Country House	Set in an important landscaped park 1.3 km SE of Ruabon and reached by a private drive running S from Broth Lodge on A539.	1627	See more images
Wynnstay Bath House	Ruabon; SJ3053743422; 52°59′01″N 3°02′10″W	6 July 1963	Bathhouse	Situated within Wynnstay Park.	1628	Upload Photo
Wynnstay Kennels (including valeting house and attached courtyard buildings and boundary walls)	Ruabon; SJ3256042952; 52°58′47″N 3°00′21″W	22 February 1995	Kennels	Built in 1843.	15723	Upload Photo
Wynnstay Dairy	Ruabon; SJ3116142635; 52°58′36″N 3°01′36″W	22 February 1995	Dairy	Situated 200m E of Wynnstay Hall.	15742	Upload Photo
Wynnstay Column	Ruabon; SJ3056843065; 52°58′50″N 3°02′08″W	22 February 1995	Column	Erected in 1789 in memory of Sir Watkin Williams-Wynn who died in 1788.	15746	Upload Photo
Wynnstay Cascade	Ruabon; SJ3036443128; 52°58′52″N 3°02′19″W	22 February 1995	Cascade	Sited within Wynnstay Park, 230m east of Wynnstay Column.	15749	Upload Photo
Bettisfield Hall	Maelor South; SJ4623835974; 52°55′07″N 2°48′04″W	17 March 1953	Hall	Set back from the main road through Bettisfield, opposite the parish church.	1639	See more images
The Bryn	Hanmer; SJ4294441012; 52°57′48″N 2°51′03″W	17 March 1953	House	Reached by a short farm road on the E side of Bryn Lane, approximately 1.6km W of Horseman's Green hamlet.	1640	Upload Photo
Willington Cross	Willington Worthenbury; SJ4496642783; 52°58′46″N 2°49′16″W	17 March 1953	Cross	Located off a lane from the cross-roads at Willington Cross, set in open fields and approached by a private drive.	1642	Willington Cross
Church of St. Dunawd	Bangor-is-y-Coed; SJ3887645404; 53°00′09″N 2°54′44″W	16 November 1962	Church	Situated in a rectangular churchyard set back from High Street.	1644	See more images
Althrey Hall	Bangor-is-y-Coed; SJ3790644093; 52°59′26″N 2°55′35″W	16 November 1962	Hall	Situated c0.8km SW of Bangor Is-y-coed, reached from a drive running W from the B5069.	1647	Upload Photo
The Ashes Farmhouse	Maelor South; SJ4446636981; 52°55′39″N 2°49′39″W	16 November 1962	Farmhouse	Reached by farm road on the NE side of a minor road between Breaden Heath and Penley, approximately 1.9km NW of Bettisfield church.	1651	Upload Photo
Bettisfield Park, including attached garden walls	Hanmer; SJ4606637500; 52°55′56″N 2°48′14″W	16 November 1962	Country House	A restored 18th century country house.	1652	Upload Photo
Church of St Chad	Hanmer; SJ4546139734; 52°57′08″N 2°48′48″W	16 November 1962	Church	In a large churchyard and the most prominent building in the village, W of The Square and N of Hanmer Mere.	1658	See more images
Wern Farmhouse	Hanmer; SJ4442640112; 52°57′20″N 2°49′43″W	16 November 1962	Farmhouse	Reached by farm road on the N side of the A539, approximately 1.1km W of Hanmer.	1664	Upload Photo
Iscoyd Park	Bronington; SJ5044941977; 52°58′22″N 2°44′22″W	16 November 1962	Hall	In its own grounds on the N side of the A525 at Redbrook, and E of a minor road to Higher Wych.	1670	See more images
Maes-y-Groes Farmhouse	Bronington; SJ4981843045; 52°58′57″N 2°44′56″W	16 November 1962	Farmhouse	On the W side of a minor road between Higher Wych and Redbrook, approximately 550m S of Higher Wych hamlet.	1677	Maes-y-Groes Farmhouse
Pen-y-bryn	Bronington; SJ4855843616; 52°59′15″N 2°46′04″W	16 November 1962	House	Reached by private road on the W side of a minor road and approximately 1.1km W of Higher Wych.	1678	Pen-y-bryn
Church of Saint Mary	Overton; SJ3733241817; 52°58′12″N 2°56′05″W	16 November 1962	Church	At right-angles to High Street, in churchyard which runs between High Street and School Lane.	1679	See more images
Knolton Hall, Knolton	Knolton, Overton-on-Dee; SJ3526040573; 52°57′31″N 2°57′55″W	16 November 1962	Hall	A 16th century house which has been successively extended and remodelled.	1691	Upload Photo
Llan-y-Cefn, Knolton	Knolton, Overton-on-Dee; SJ3560141081; 52°57′48″N 2°57′37″W	16 November 1962	House	House with panelled interiors of the exceptional interest.	1692	Upload Photo
Horseman's Green Farmhouse	Hanmer; SJ4473541421; 52°58′02″N 2°49′28″W	16 November 1962	Farmhouse	On the N side of the hamlet, set back on the W side of a minor road to the A525.	1704	Upload Photo
Miners' Institute	Rhosllanerchrugog; SJ2925246535; 53°00′41″N 3°03′21″W	17 March 1987	Institute	An imposing public building above street level, up steps in a railed forecourt.	1721	See more images
Bryn-y-Grog Hall	Marchwiel; SJ3484448398; 53°01′44″N 2°58′23″W	19 July 1989	Hall	Situated c. 1km NW of Marchwiel in open countryside above the main road from Marchwiel to Wrexham.	1727	Upload Photo
Former agent's house at site of Brymbo Ironworks	Brymbo; SJ2947053475; 53°04′26″N 3°03′15″W	25 October 1991	House	On the hillside to the S of the old ironworks site at Brymbo, adjacent to the rail line to Brymbo Colliery. Access by track and then steps from the main level of the ironworks.	1731	Former agent's house at site of Brymbo Ironworks
Lower Berse Farmhouse, Berse Lane	Offa, Wrexham; SJ3121950083; 53°02′37″N 3°01′39″W	6 July 1963	Farmhouse	Farmhouse, remodelled in 1873 but incorporating the remains of an earlier timber framed hall.	1762	Upload Photo
Tomb of Elihu Yale west of St Giles' Church	Offa, Wrexham; SJ3352150113; 53°02′39″N 2°59′35″W	16 June 1980	Tomb	West of the tower of Saint Giles' church.	1770	Tomb of Elihu Yale west of St Giles' Church
St. Giles' churchyard gates, Church Street	Offa, Wrexham; SJ3353050168; 53°02′41″N 2°59′35″W	30 May 1951	Gates	Main entrance gates to churchyard, erected in 1720.	1774	St. Giles' churchyard gates, Church Street
Croesnewydd Hall, Rhyd Broughton Lane	Offa, Wrexham; SJ3211150606; 53°02′54″N 3°00′51″W	6 September 1952	Hall	In Wrexham Technology Park.	1806	See more images
No 7 Town Hill	Offa, Wrexham; SJ3348050188; 53°02′41″N 2°59′37″W	16 June 1980	House	Late-medieval timber framed building.	1817	No 7 Town Hill
Penrhos Engine House	Brymbo; SJ2856953225; 53°04′17″N 3°04′03″W	12 January 1995	Engine House	On the N side of the road running on the W side of the former Steel Works site, W of Pen-Rhos Farm.	14889	Penrhos Engine House
Vertical winding engine house at the former Wynnstay Colliery, Plas Madoc	Ruabon; SJ2937243285; 52°58′56″N 3°03′12″W	22 February 1995	Engine House	Built 1855-6 as one of the original structures of the Wynnstay Colliery.	15731	Vertical winding engine house at the former Wynnstay Colliery, Plas Madoc
No 7, Church Street	Offa, Wrexham; SJ3351350186; 53°02′41″N 2°59′35″W	7 March 1974	Wine Bar	Chequers Wine Bar. Situated on west side of Church Street, in a prominent position on approach to the church.	1776	No 7, Church Street
No 8 Church Street	Offa, Wrexham; SJ3351250189; 53°02′41″N 2°59′35″W	7 March 1974	Wine Bar	Chequers Wine Bar. Situated on west side of Church Street, in a prominent position on approach to the church.	16477	No 8 Church Street
No 9 Church Street	Offa, Wrexham; SJ3351050195; 53°02′42″N 2°59′36″W	7 March 1974	Wine Bar	Chequers Wine Bar. Situated on west side of Church Street, in a prominent position on approach to the church.	16478	No 9 Church Street
No 10 Church Street	Offa, Wrexham; SJ3350850199; 53°02′42″N 2°59′36″W	7 March 1974	House	Situated on west side of Church Street, in a prominent position on approach to the church.	16479	No 10 Church Street
Single Storey Building to SE of Octagonal Building at Bersham Ironworks Site	Bersham, Esclusham; SJ3073349229; 53°02′09″N 3°02′04″W	6 July 1963	Ironworks	In the centre of Bersham Village, towards the E end of the Ironworks site.	16539	Upload Photo
Church of Saint Mary	Bersham, Esclusham; SJ3052149281; 53°02′11″N 3°02′15″W	12 August 1995	Church	In a wooded churchyard on the W side of Bersham village.	16553	See more images
Bersham Colliery No 2 Headframe	Bersham, Esclusham; SJ3145948170; 53°01′35″N 3°01′24″W	12 August 1995	Colliery headstock	On the SE side of the lane which leaves Wrexham Road opposite Church Street towards the W end of Rhostyllen.	16567	Bersham Colliery No 2 Headframe
Kitchen and attached laundries, bakehouse and scullery at Erddig	Marchwiel; SJ3260048190; 53°01′36″N 3°00′23″W	6 July 1963	Kitchen block	Situated immediately to the S of Erddig and attached to the house by a late C19 linking block.	17850	Upload Photo
Screen and gates closing the formal garden at Erddig	Marchwiel; SJ3288948265; 53°01′39″N 3°00′08″W	12 March 1996	Screen and Gates	Situated at the far end of the ornamental canal in the formal garden to the E of Erddig.	17859	Screen and gates closing the formal garden at Erddig
Cup and Saucer	Marchwiel; SJ3245648401; 53°01′43″N 3°00′31″W	12 March 1996	Hydraulic system	Situated c0.2m NW of Erddig to the W of the carriage drive.	17869	Cup and Saucer
War Memorial	Chirk; SJ2905137755; 52°55′57″N 3°03′25″W	29 July 1998	War memorial	The war memorial is set on a traffic island at the junction of Station Avenue with Church Street, near the centre of Chirk	20202	See more images
Chirk Tunnel, including the N and S portals, and Chirk Basin	Chirk; SJ2864337451; 52°55′47″N 3°03′47″W	29 July 1998	Tunnel	The Chirk tunnel continues the canal N from Chirk basin at the N end of the aqueduct, and is reached by a path from Castle Road.	20209	See more images
Railway Viaduct over River Ceiriog	Chirk; SJ2866837285; 52°55′42″N 3°03′45″W	29 July 1998	Viaduct	The viaduct crosses the valley parallel to Chirk Aqueduct, 550m SW of the Church at the centre of the village.	20210	See more images
Chirk Castle Stable Ranges	Chirk; SJ2683238038; 52°56′05″N 3°05′24″W	29 July 1998	Stables	The stables adjoin the castle to the S, forming two sides of the service courtyard	20248	Upload Photo
Church of St John the Baptist	Maelor South; SJ4613236021; 52°55′08″N 2°48′09″W	17 October 2001	Church	In a large churchyard opposite Bettisfield Hall Farm, beyond the N end of the village.	25804	See more images
Ceiriog Memorial Institute including retaining wall and railings	Llansantffraid Glyn Ceiriog; SJ2021237848; 52°55′56″N 3°11′19″W	7 August 2003	Institute	Located towards the S end of the High Street. The ground rises to the W and the building is slightly raised above road level.	81286	Upload Photo
Fenn's Moss Peat Processing Works	Bronington; SJ4780736656; 52°55′29″N 2°46′40″W	20 October 2005	Peat works	An isolated building on the S side of a former railway, approximately 2.2km NE of Bettisfield.	85456	Upload Photo
The Gelli	Bronington; SJ4640943809; 52°59′20″N 2°47′59″W	20 October 2005	Country house	Reached by private road on the N side of a minor road between Tallarn Green and Tybroughton, approximately 1.9km ESE of Tallarn Green church.	85502	See more images
Gates and gate piers at south entrance to Hanmer churchyard	Hanmer; SJ4544239656; 52°57′05″N 2°48′49″W	15 November 2005	Gates	On the S side of the churchyard opposite Hanmer Mere.	86936	Gates and gate piers at south entrance to Hanmer churchyard
Hanmer churchyard cross	Hanmer; SJ4546539721; 52°57′08″N 2°48′47″W	15 November 2005	Cross	On the S side of the nave, and immediately S of the footpath leading from porch to The Square.	86940	Hanmer churchyard cross
Hanmer war memorial	Hanmer; SJ4542339661; 52°57′06″N 2°48′50″W	15 November 2005	War memorial	Set into the S churchyard wall W of the main entrance and opposite Hanmer Mere.	86941	Hanmer war memorial
The Stables at Bettisfield Park	Hanmer; SJ4607937592; 52°55′59″N 2°48′13″W	16 November 1962	Stables	On the N side of the house and reached by a separate entrance from New Road.	86950	Upload Photo

== See also ==
- Grade I listed buildings in Wrexham County Borough
