= Maelor =

Area of Wales

Coordinates: 53.0°N 2.91°W

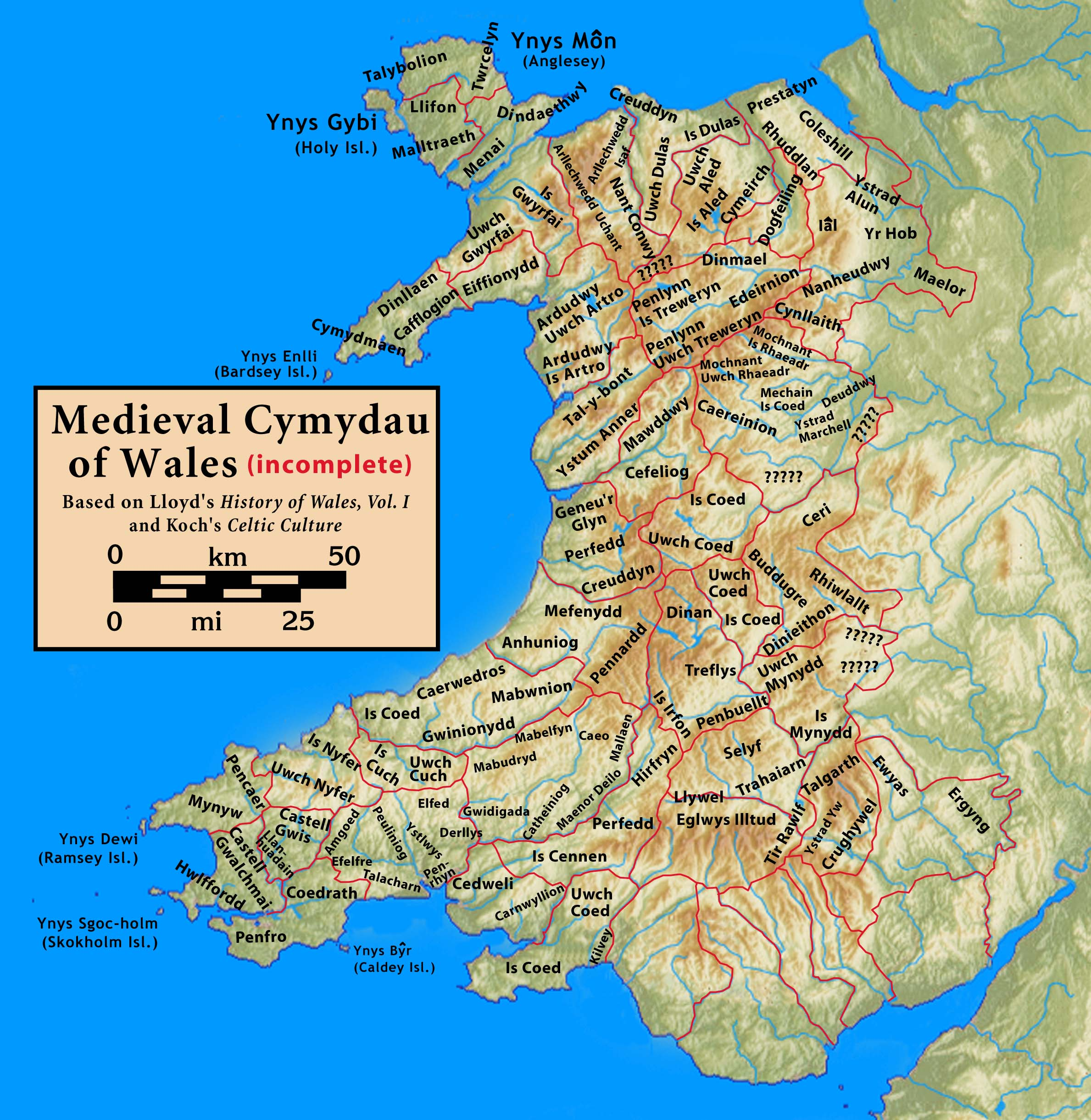
Medieval commotes of Wales, with Maelor, only covering English Maelor in the north-east.

The Maelor is an area of north-east Wales along the border with England. It is now entirely part of Wrexham County Borough. The name Maelor is an old Welsh word: it can be translated as "land of the prince", from mael ("prince") and llawr ("low ground", "region").

== History ==
The Maelor originated as a cantref of the Kingdom of Powys, focused on the monastic settlement of Bangor-on-Dee and containing the commotes of Maelor, Yale (Iâl), the Alyn Valley (Ystrad Alun) and Hope (Yr Hob).

Most of the area fell under control of the Kingdom of Mercia during the eighth century, with Offa's Dyke delineating the new border. By the time of the 1066 Norman conquest of England, its eastern areas were recorded as held by Edwin, Earl of Mercia: they were later granted to the Norman magnate Hugh d'Avranches, Earl of Chester. The lands of the Maelor were only reincorporated in Powys during the reign of Stephen of England (1135–54) by Madog ap Maredudd. He died in 1160 and the kingdom was subdivided amongst his heirs.

By the early 13th century, when it was part of the lands of Madog ap Gruffydd, Prince of Powys Fadog, the Maelor was divided into two parts. Maelor Gymraeg ("Welsh Maelor"), also known by the English name Bromfield, lay west of the river Dee and was based on the commotes of Wrexham and Merford. Maelor Saesneg ("English Maelor") included parts of the parishes of Overton, Ellesmere, Whittington and Oswestry; Malaur Saisnec appears in a document as early as 1202. Saesneg ("English") is believed to relate specifically to the area's religious administration rather than linguistic factors, as it was historically part of the ancient Diocese of Lichfield and Chester. The Welsh Maelor remained within the Diocese of St Asaph.

Welsh political control of the area ceased in 1282-3 following Edward I's conquest of Wales. The English Maelor became a personal property of the crown and in 1284, along with other royal estates in the region, was amalgamated into the new county of Flintshire, while the Welsh Maelor remained part of the Marcher Lordship of Bromfield and Yale, which Edward granted to Earl John de Warenne.

== English Maelor ==
The English Maelor (Welsh: Maelor Saesneg) is the area east of the River Dee extending almost to Whitchurch. In 1397, under Richard II of England, the English Maelor was attached to the County Palatine of Chester to form the Principality of Chester. It continued as a personal possession of the crown until 1536 and the Laws in Wales Acts.

Although part of Flintshire, the administrative changes of 1536 confirmed the Hundred of Maelor or English Maelor as an exclave, surrounded by Cheshire, Shropshire and Denbighshire. The administrative centre of the area, often referred to as Flintshire Detached, was Overton and it included the villages of Bangor-on-Dee, Bettisfield, Bronington, Hanmer, Halghton, Penley, Tybroughton, Willington and Worthenbury.

In 1887 a Boundary Commission was appointed to review the boundaries of counties in England and Wales. At an inquiry at Overton, it was found that most of the population of the area favoured it becoming part of Shropshire, and this was later supported by resolution of the Flintshire justices of the peace. However, when local government legislation was introduced no change was made.

Under the Local Government Act 1894, the area became Overton Rural District, which was again renamed in 1953 as Maelor Rural District, remaining as a detached part of Flintshire until 1974.

== Maelor Gymraeg ==
The Maelor Gymraeg, the "Welsh Maelor", is the part of the Maelor lying to the west of the River Dee. It included parts of the ancient parishes of Bersham, Erbistock, Marchwiel, Ruabon, Wrexham and Gresford.

After the Edwardian conquest this area continued as part of the Lordship of Bromfield and Yale until 1536, when it was included in the newly created county of Denbighshire as the Hundred of Bromfield.

== The Maelor today ==
In 1974, local government in Wales was reorganised, and both halves of the Maelor were included in Wrexham Maelor, one of six districts in the new county of Clwyd. In 1996 a further local government reorganisation took place, and Maelor became part of the newly created county borough of Wrexham.
