= Maelor Rural District =

Abolished Welsh rural district

Coordinates: 53.064°N 2.872°W

Overton / Maelor
- Area
  - 1911: 29,750 acres (120.4 km^{2})
  - 1961: 29,749 acres (120.39 km^{2})
- Population
  - 1901: 5,057
  - 1971: 4,698
- History
  - Origin: rural sanitary district
  - Created: 1894
  - Abolished: 1974
  - Succeeded by: Wrexham Maelor
- Status: rural district
- Government: Overton Rural District Council (1894–1953); Maelor Rural District Council (1953–1974)
  - HQ: Overton
- Subdivisions
  - Type: Civil parishes

Maelor was a rural district in the administrative county of Flintshire, Wales, from 1894 to 1974. The area approximated to the hundred of Maelor or English Maelor (Welsh: Maelor Saesneg), and was notable for forming a detached part of the county, surrounded by Cheshire, Denbighshire and Shropshire. The administrative centre was located at Overton.

The district was formed as Overton Rural District by the Local Government Act 1894 from the Flintshire parishes of Ellesmere, Whitchurch and Wrexham Rural Sanitary Districts. It was renamed as Maelor Rural District in 1953. It consisted of eleven civil parishes:

- Bangor on Dee
- Bettisfield
- Bronington
- Halghton
- Hanmer
- Iscoyd
- Overton
- Penley
- Tybroughton
- Willington
- Worthenbury

The district was abolished in 1974 by the Local Government Act 1972, when it was merged into Wrexham Maelor, one of six districts of the new County of Clwyd.
