= Grade II listed buildings in Willington Worthenbury =

Map of the community in Wrexham County Borough.

In the United Kingdom, the term listed building refers to a building or other structure officially designated as being of special architectural, historical, or cultural significance; Grade II structures are those considered to be "buildings of special interest which justify every effort being made to preserve them". Listing was begun by a provision in the Town and Country Planning Act 1947. Once listed, strict limitations are imposed on the modifications allowed to a building's structure or fittings. In Wales, the authority for listing under the Planning (Listed Buildings and Conservation Areas) Act 1990 rests with Cadw.

This is a list of the 28 Grade II listed buildings in the community of Willington Worthenbury, in Wrexham County Borough.

Name	Location Grid Ref. (Note: Sometimes known as OSGB36, the grid reference is based on the British national grid reference system used by the Ordnance Survey.) Geo-coordinates	Date Listed	Type/Function	Notes	Reference Number	Image
Admiralty House	Willington Worthenbury; SJ4198146159; 53.009581°N 2.8661553°W	07 May 1998	Domestic		19769	–
Bowling Bank Farmhouse including attached farm range to west	Willington Worthenbury; SJ4222846008; 53.008251°N 2.8624474°W	16 November 1962	Industrial		1708	–
Bridge Cottages, Hurdle View	Willington Worthenbury; SJ4492943841; 52.989058°N 2.821828°W	16 November 1962	Domestic		1701	–
Bridge to West of stable courtyard at Emral Hall	Willington Worthenbury; SJ4202244163; 52.991645°N 2.8651854°W	07 May 1998	Religious, Ritual and Funerary		19783	–
Broughton Hall Lodge	Willington Worthenbury; SJ4307046389; 53.011765°N 2.8499676°W	07 May 1998	Transport		19770	–
Buck Farm	Willington Worthenbury; SJ4344042379; 52.975762°N 2.8437505°W	16 November 1962	Domestic		1702	–
Church of St Mary Magdelene	Willington Worthenbury; SJ4456744174; 52.992014°N 2.8272772°W	16 October 2008	Gardens, Parks and Urban Spaces		87570	–
Emral Hall Lodge	Willington Worthenbury; SJ4132144441; 52.994067°N 2.8756779°W	07 May 1998			19771	–
Frog Lane Cottage (East)	Willington Worthenbury; SJ4229546215; 53.010118°N 2.8614861°W	07 May 1998	Domestic		19775	–
Frog Lane Cottage (West)	Willington Worthenbury; SJ4220146234; 53.010279°N 2.8628903°W	07 May 1998	Agriculture and Subsistence		19774	–
Glandeg Farmhouse	Willington Worthenbury; SJ4333246957; 53.016899°N 2.8461629°W	16 November 1962	Gardens, Parks and Urban Spaces		14655	–
Hollybush Farmhouse	Willington Worthenbury; SJ4088143892; 52.989084°N 2.8821319°W	16 November 1962	Religious, Ritual and Funerary		1709	–
Ice House to rear of North Stable Block at Emral Hall	Willington Worthenbury; SJ4207144173; 52.99174°N 2.8644573°W	16 November 1962	Domestic		14654	–
Kenyon Cottages	Willington Worthenbury; SJ4467344115; 52.991495°N 2.8256881°W	07 May 1998			19780	–
Lane Farm Farmhouse	Willington Worthenbury; SJ4610543471; 52.985852°N 2.8042495°W	07 May 1998	Domestic		19782	–
Lychgate to Church of Saint Mary Magdalene	Willington Worthenbury; SJ4458644208; 52.992321°N 2.827°W	16 October 2008	Domestic		87571	–
Mulsford Hall	Willington Worthenbury; SJ4309243795; 52.988452°N 2.849182°W	17 March 1953	Transport		1643	–
North Stable Block at Emral Hall	Willington Worthenbury; SJ4206144157; 52.991595°N 2.8646034°W	07 May 1998	Domestic		19772	–
Oak Farm Farmhouse	Willington Worthenbury; SJ4490643692; 52.987717°N 2.8221451°W	27 January 1995	Domestic		15675	–
Sarn Bridge	Willington Worthenbury; SJ4400844743; 52.99707°N 2.8357029°W	16 November 1962	Commercial		1706	–
Shop Cottage	Willington Worthenbury; SJ4199146144; 53.009447°N 2.8660035°W	07 May 1998	Commercial		19778	–
South Stable Block at Emral Hall	Willington Worthenbury; SJ4203844127; 52.991323°N 2.8649406°W	07 May 1998	Transport		19773	–
Tallarn Green Temperance Room	Willington Worthenbury; SJ4445544361; 52.993683°N 2.8289777°W	07 May 1998	Domestic		19781	–
The Fields	Willington Worthenbury; SJ4368943185; 52.983033°N 2.8401833°W	16 November 1962	Domestic		1703	–
The Malt House including attached cottage to right	Willington Worthenbury; SJ4198646151; 53.00951°N 2.8660793°W	16 November 1962			1707	–
The Manor and Quinton	Willington Worthenbury; SJ4189045965; 53.007827°N 2.8674764°W	07 May 1998			19776	–
The Old Rectory	Willington Worthenbury; SJ4209146035; 53.008478°N 2.8644938°W	07 May 1998	Domestic		19777	–
Worthenbury Bridge	Willington Worthenbury; SJ4190146067; 53.008745°N 2.8673308°W	07 May 1998	Commercial		19779	–

== See also ==
- Grade II listed buildings in Wrexham County Borough
- Grade II listed buildings in Bangor-on-Dee
- Grade II listed buildings in Bronington
- Grade II listed buildings in Hanmer, Wrexham
- Grade II listed buildings in Maelor South
- Grade II listed buildings in Overton-on-Dee
