= Grade II listed buildings in Overton-on-Dee =

Map of the community in Wrexham County Borough.

In the United Kingdom, the term listed building refers to a building or other structure officially designated as being of special architectural, historical, or cultural significance; Grade II structures are those considered to be "buildings of special interest which justify every effort being made to preserve them". Listing was begun by a provision in the Town and Country Planning Act 1947. Once listed, strict limitations are imposed on the modifications allowed to a building's structure or fittings. In Wales, the authority for listing under the Planning (Listed Buildings and Conservation Areas) Act 1990 rests with Cadw.

This is a list of the 76 Grade II listed buildings in the community of Overton-on-Dee (Overton), in Wrexham County Borough.

| Name | Location Grid Ref. (Note: Sometimes known as OSGB36, the grid reference is based on the British national grid reference system used by the Ordnance Survey.) Geo-coordinates | Date Listed | Type/Function | Notes | Reference Number | Image |
|---|---|---|---|---|---|---|
| 2 High Street, Overton, Clwyd | Overton; SJ3730941941; 52.971142°N 2.9349569°W | 16 November 1962 | Domestic | | 14434 | – |
| 26 Salop Road, Overton, Clwyd | Overton; SJ3737141452; 52.966754°N 2.9339391°W | 15 March 1994 | Domestic | | 14453 | – |
| 18 High Street | Overton; SJ3732441873; 52.970533°N 2.9347204°W | 16 November 1962 | Domestic | | 14437 | – |
| 1st Outbuilding to Gwydyr House | Overton; SJ3730841736; 52.969299°N 2.934932°W | 15 March 1994 | Domestic | | 14445 | – |
| 2nd outbuilding to Gwydyr House | Overton; SJ3733441736; 52.969302°N 2.9345449°W | 15 March 1994 | Commercial | | 14446 | – |
| Argoed Farmhouse | Overton; SJ3782042611; 52.977224°N 2.9274779°W | 15 March 1994 | Agriculture and Subsistence | | 14431 | – |
| Ash Grove | Overton; SJ3665740830; 52.96108°N 2.9444464°W | 15 March 1994 | Domestic | | 14473 | – |
| Asney Park Farmhouse | Overton; SJ3618743911; 52.988716°N 2.952051°W | 15 March 1994 | | | 14487 | – |
| Barton's Bridge | Overton; SJ3540740265; 52.955852°N 2.9629397°W | 27 February 1992 | | | 1741 | – |
| Bryn Cottage, including iron forecourt railings | Overton; SJ3726741961; 52.971317°N 2.9355861°W | 30 November 2006 | Gardens, Parks and Urban Spaces | | 87508 | – |
| Bryn-y-Pys Estate Office | Overton; SJ3726041754; 52.969456°N 2.9356501°W | 16 November 1962 | Domestic | | 1681 | – |
| Bryn-y-Pys Lodge | Overton; SJ3723941994; 52.97161°N 2.9360094°W | 15 March 1994 | Domestic | | 14467 | – |
| Byre/Stable Range at Gwalia Farm | Overton; SJ3616840479; 52.957867°N 2.9516559°W | 15 March 1994 | Religious, Ritual and Funerary | | 14477 | – |
| Candlewick Cottage | Overton; SJ3737141456; 52.96679°N 2.9339398°W | 15 March 1994 | Domestic | | 14452 | – |
| Church Cottage | Overton; SJ3731141857; 52.970387°N 2.9349108°W | 16 November 1962 | Institutional | | 1684 | – |
| Cintra | Overton; SJ3736741617; 52.968237°N 2.9340306°W | 15 March 1994 | Domestic | | 14449 | – |
| Dispensary Row | Overton; SJ3731741972; 52.971422°N 2.9348438°W | 15 March 1994 | Domestic | | 14459 | – |
| Dispensary Row | Overton; SJ3731341974; 52.971439°N 2.9349038°W | 13 March 1994 | Domestic | | 14460 | – |
| Dispensary Row | Overton; SJ3730841975; 52.971448°N 2.9349784°W | 13 March 1994 | Agriculture and Subsistence | | 14461 | – |
| Dispensary Row | Overton; SJ3730441976; 52.971456°N 2.9350381°W | 13 March 1994 | Religious, Ritual and Funerary | | 14462 | – |
| Dispensary Row | Overton; SJ3730041977; 52.971465°N 2.9350979°W | 13 March 1994 | Transport | | 14463 | – |
| Dispensary Row | Overton; SJ3729641978; 52.971473°N 2.9351576°W | 13 March 1994 | Domestic | | 14464 | – |
| Dispensary Row | Overton; SJ3729241979; 52.971482°N 2.9352174°W | 13 March 1994 | | | 14465 | – |
| Dispensary Row | Overton; SJ3728741980; 52.97149°N 2.935292°W | 13 March 1994 | Domestic | | 14466 | – |
| Fairfield | Overton; SJ3736941566; 52.967779°N 2.9339909°W | 15 March 1994 | Gardens, Parks and Urban Spaces | | 14450 | – |
| Farm-Buildings and Icehouse at Llan-y-Cefn | Overton; SJ3563241053; 52.962962°N 2.9597479°W | 15 March 1994 | Domestic | | 14475 | – |
| Ferndale | Overton; SJ3736941631; 52.968363°N 2.9340035°W | 15 March 1994 | Domestic | | 14447 | – |
| Former Lloyd's Bank Premises | Overton; SJ3732741707; 52.969041°N 2.9346435°W | 16 November 1962 | Domestic | | 1687 | – |
| Former Stable-Range including Dovecote at Bryn-y-Pys | Overton; SJ3690442697; 52.977889°N 2.9411344°W | 24 October 1991 | Agriculture and Subsistence | | 1736 | – |
| Gate Piers and Gates to former Bryn-y-Pys Hall | Overton; SJ3722641990; 52.971573°N 2.9362022°W | 15 March 1994 | Commercial | | 14468 | – |
| Gwalia | Overton; SJ3588840585; 52.958786°N 2.9558444°W | 15 March 1994 | Domestic | | 14474 | – |
| Gwalia Farmhouse | Overton; SJ3615140474; 52.95782°N 2.9519079°W | 15 March 1994 | | | 14476 | – |
| Gwaylod House | Overton; SJ3562442667; 52.977467°N 2.9601885°W | 15 March 1994 | Agriculture and Subsistence | | 14482 | – |
| Gwydyr House (former RS & P Garden Machinery Specialists) | Overton; SJ3735341733; 52.969278°N 2.9342615°W | 19 March 1993 | Religious, Ritual and Funerary | | 1744 | – |
| House, including iron forecourt railings. | Overton; SJ3727141961; 52.971317°N 2.9355266°W | 30 November 2006 | Domestic | | 87507 | – |
| Jubilee Pump | Overton; SJ3740441725; 52.969212°N 2.9335007°W | 15 March 1994 | Domestic | | 14442 | – |
| Kew Cottage | Overton; SJ3736941625; 52.968309°N 2.9340024°W | 15 March 1994 | Domestic | | 14448 | – |
| Knolton Mission Church | Overton; SJ3727139359; 52.947931°N 2.9350217°W | 15 March 1994 | Gardens, Parks and Urban Spaces | | 14478 | – |
| Lightwood Hall Farmhouse | Overton; SJ3819940754; 52.960577°N 2.9214792°W | 15 March 1994 | | | 14481 | – |
| Metcalfe Building | Overton; SJ3732741906; 52.97083°N 2.9346821°W | 15 March 1994 | Domestic | | 14439 | – |
| Metcalfe Building | Overton; SJ3732441907; 52.970838°N 2.934727°W | 15 March 1994 | Religious, Ritual and Funerary | | 14440 | – |
| Mile Post adjacent to Trotting Mare Public House | Overton; SJ3795938744; 52.942483°N 2.924666°W | 15 March 1994 | Domestic | | 14489 | – |
| Mile Post opposite drive to Queensbridge | Overton; SJ3712540189; 52.955373°N 2.9373556°W | 15 March 1994 | Domestic | | 14488 | – |
| Min-Yr-Afon | Overton; SJ3549142542; 52.976328°N 2.962144°W | 15 March 1994 | Domestic | | 14486 | – |
| No. 1, High Street (W side), Clwyd | Overton; SJ3731141949; 52.971214°N 2.9349287°W | 16 November 1962 | Industrial | | 14433 | – |
| No. 16, Salop Road (W side), Clwyd | Overton; SJ3732541478; 52.966982°N 2.9346289°W | 15 March 1994 | Commercial | | 14454 | – |
| No. 17, High Street (E side) (previously listed as chemist and bank), Clwyd | Overton; SJ3731341865; 52.970459°N 2.9348826°W | 16 November 1962 | Commercial | | 1683 | – |
| No. 17, Salop Road (W side), Clwyd | Overton; SJ3732441474; 52.966946°N 2.934643°W | 15 March 1994 | Commercial | | 14455 | – |
| No. 18, Salop Road (W side), Clwyd | Overton; SJ3732441470; 52.96691°N 2.9346422°W | 15 March 1994 | Transport | | 14456 | – |
| No. 3, High Street (W side), Clwyd | Overton; SJ3730641932; 52.971061°N 2.9349998°W | 16 November 1962 | Domestic | | 14435 | – |
| Outbuildings attached to rear of Fairfield | Overton; SJ3738541559; 52.967718°N 2.9337514°W | 15 March 1994 | Domestic | | 14451 | – |
| Outbuildings to Gwaylod House | Overton; SJ3563842669; 52.977487°N 2.9599804°W | 15 March 1994 | Religious, Ritual and Funerary | | 14483 | – |
| Overton Bridge | Overton; SJ3544242704; 52.977778°N 2.962906°W | 15 March 1994 | Religious, Ritual and Funerary | | 14485 | – |
| Park View | Overton; SJ3722941954; 52.97125°N 2.9361505°W | 15 March 1994 | Domestic | | 14471 | – |
| Pen Dyffryn | Overton; SJ3726141370; 52.966004°N 2.9355607°W | 15 March 1994 | Domestic | | 14458 | – |
| Pendas House | Overton; SJ3732641971; 52.971414°N 2.9347096°W | 16 November 1962 | Domestic | | 1690 | – |
| Pen-y-Llan House | Overton; SJ3727041717; 52.969124°N 2.9354941°W | 15 March 1994 | Domestic | | 14443 | – |
| Plas-yn-Coed Farmhouse | Overton; SJ3880341562; 52.967909°N 2.9126416°W | 16 November 1962 | Domestic | | 1689 | – |
| Poulton Bridge | Overton; SJ3969243172; 52.98248°N 2.8997073°W | 15 March 1994 | Domestic | | 14472 | – |
| Quinta Cottage | Overton; SJ3740341937; 52.971117°N 2.9335566°W | 16 November 1962 | | | 1688 | – |
| Railings and Gates (to 16, 17 & 18) | Overton; SJ3733041466; 52.966875°N 2.9345521°W | 15 March 1994 | Domestic | | 14457 | – |
| Railings to forecourt of Gwaylod House | Overton; SJ3562442658; 52.977386°N 2.9601867°W | 15 March 1994 | Religious, Ritual and Funerary | | 14484 | – |
| Saint Mary's House | Overton; SJ3724441745; 52.969373°N 2.9358866°W | 16 November 1962 | Domestic | | 1680 | – |
| Stable-Block at Gwernheylod | Overton; SJ3706843103; 52.981558°N 2.9387714°W | 29 July 1991 | Industrial | | 1734 | – |
| Telephone Call-box | Overton; SJ3729241870; 52.970502°N 2.9351962°W | 19 July 1989 | | | 1728 | – |
| The Brow | Overton; SJ3700441935; 52.971052°N 2.9394967°W | 15 March 1994 | Gardens, Parks and Urban Spaces | | 14470 | – |
| The Homestead | Overton; SJ3660539717; 52.95107°N 2.9450023°W | 15 March 1994 | Religious, Ritual and Funerary | | 14480 | – |
| The Old Smithy, including iron forecourt railings | Overton; SJ3725941961; 52.971316°N 2.9357052°W | 30 November 2006 | Domestic | | 87509 | – |
| The Quinta | Overton; SJ3734441948; 52.971209°N 2.9344372°W | 15 March 1994 | Domestic | | 14441 | – |
| Top Farmhouse | Overton; SJ3659039460; 52.948758°N 2.9451751°W | 15 March 1994 | Gardens, Parks and Urban Spaces | | 14479 | – |
| Ty Gwernen | Overton; SJ3751742125; 52.97282°N 2.9318957°W | 15 March 1994 | Domestic | | 14432 | – |
| Wall with two former Outbuildings | Overton; SJ3728241740; 52.969332°N 2.9353199°W | 15 March 1994 | Domestic | | 14444 | – |
| War Memorial | Overton; SJ3728041814; 52.969997°N 2.935364°W | 15 March 1994 | Domestic | | 14436 | – |
| West Lodge to Bryn-y-Pys | Overton; SJ3623742541; 52.976408°N 2.9510357°W | 15 March 1994 | Domestic | | 14469 | – |
| White Cottage | Overton; SJ3731941882; 52.970613°N 2.9347966°W | 16 November 1962 | Domestic | | 1682 | – |
| White Horse Public House | Overton; SJ3733841887; 52.97066°N 2.9345147°W | 15 March 1994 | Commercial | | 14438 | – |

== See also ==
- Grade II listed buildings in Wrexham County Borough
- Grade II listed buildings in Bangor-on-Dee
- Grade II listed buildings in Bronington
- Grade II listed buildings in Hanmer, Wrexham
- Grade II listed buildings in Maelor South
- Grade II listed buildings in Willington Worthenbury
