= Grade II listed buildings in Maelor South =

Map of the community in Wrexham County Borough.

In the United Kingdom, the term listed building refers to a building or other structure officially designated as being of special architectural, historical, or cultural significance; Grade II structures are those considered to be "buildings of special interest which justify every effort being made to preserve them". Listing was begun by a provision in the Town and Country Planning Act 1947. Once listed, strict limitations are imposed on the modifications allowed to a building's structure or fittings. In Wales, the authority for listing under the Planning (Listed Buildings and Conservation Areas) Act 1990 rests with Cadw.

This is a list of the 21 Grade II listed buildings in the community of Maelor South, in Wrexham County Borough.

Name	Location Grid Ref. (Note: Sometimes known as OSGB36, the grid reference is based on the British national grid reference system used by the Ordnance Survey.) Geo-coordinates	Date Listed	Type/Function	Notes	Reference Number	Image
Bettisfield Bridge (Bridge No 48, Llangollen Canal)	Maelor South; SJ4595235535; 52.914505°N 2.805202°W	18 November 2005	Domestic		86958	–
Bettisfield war memorial	Maelor South; SJ4616236023; 52.918913°N 2.8021605°W	18 November 2005	Industrial		86959	–
Bettisfield Windmill	Maelor South; SJ4720334911; 52.909021°N 2.7864985°W	16 November 1962	Industrial		1650	–
Blackhurst Farmhouse	Maelor South; SJ4626933536; 52.896569°N 2.8001571°W	18 November 2005	Domestic		86960	–
Bryn Aber	Maelor South; SJ3917440727; 52.960446°N 2.9069612°W	18 November 2005	Transport		86961	–
Cornhill Bridge (Bridge No 47, Llangollen Canal)	Maelor South; SJ4661935577; 52.91495°N 2.7952909°W	18 November 2005	Religious, Ritual and Funerary		86962	–
Dymock Arms	Maelor South; SJ4199439693; 52.951465°N 2.8647999°W	16 November 1962	Domestic		1693	–
Lane Farmhouse	Maelor South; SJ4138840626; 52.959785°N 2.8739875°W	16 November 1962	Domestic		1695	–
Little Hall Farmhouse	Maelor South; SJ4518036829; 52.926058°N 2.8169002°W	18 November 2005			86963	–
Lych gate at Church of St John the Baptist	Maelor South; SJ4617336011; 52.918806°N 2.8019949°W	18 November 2005	Domestic		86964	–
Madras Voluntary Aided School	Maelor South; SJ4122740025; 52.954365°N 2.8762747°W	18 November 2005	Domestic		86965	–
Multi-purpose farm building at Blackhurst Farm	Maelor South; SJ4627033567; 52.896848°N 2.8001474°W	18 November 2005	Domestic		86966	–
Multi-purpose farm building at Rhyd-y-cyffin Farm	Maelor South; SJ4063141864; 52.970829°N 2.8854827°W	18 November 2005			86967	–
Old Hall Farmhouse	Maelor South; SJ4091140150; 52.955454°N 2.8810005°W	16 November 1962	Domestic		1696	–
Rhyd-y-cyffin Farmhouse	Maelor South; SJ4065241846; 52.970669°N 2.8851667°W	18 November 2005	Domestic		86968	–
Sandy Lane Farmhouse	Maelor South; SJ4029940198; 52.955818°N 2.890118°W	18 November 2005	Domestic		86969	–
Shippon (former barn) at Sandy Lane Farm	Maelor South; SJ4031640191; 52.955757°N 2.8898637°W	18 November 2005	Domestic		86970	–
Stable and shippon at Sandy Lane Farm	Maelor South; SJ4031040213; 52.955954°N 2.889957°W	18 November 2005	Domestic		86971	–
Stryt Lydan	Maelor South; SJ4292639637; 52.951062°N 2.8509199°W	18 November 2005	Domestic		86972	–
Stryt Lydan Farm-house	Maelor South; SJ4339539584; 52.950635°N 2.843931°W	3 August 2006	Transport		87499	–
Wyen Wenn Farmhouse	Maelor South; SJ4371038812; 52.943729°N 2.8391089°W	18 November 2005	Commercial		86973	–

== See also ==
- Grade II listed buildings in Wrexham County Borough
- Grade II listed buildings in Bangor-on-Dee
- Grade II listed buildings in Bronington
- Grade II listed buildings in Hanmer, Wrexham
- Grade II listed buildings in Overton-on-Dee
- Grade II listed buildings in Willington Worthenbury
