= Overton-on-Dee =

Village in Wales

Overton: Welsh: Owrtyn
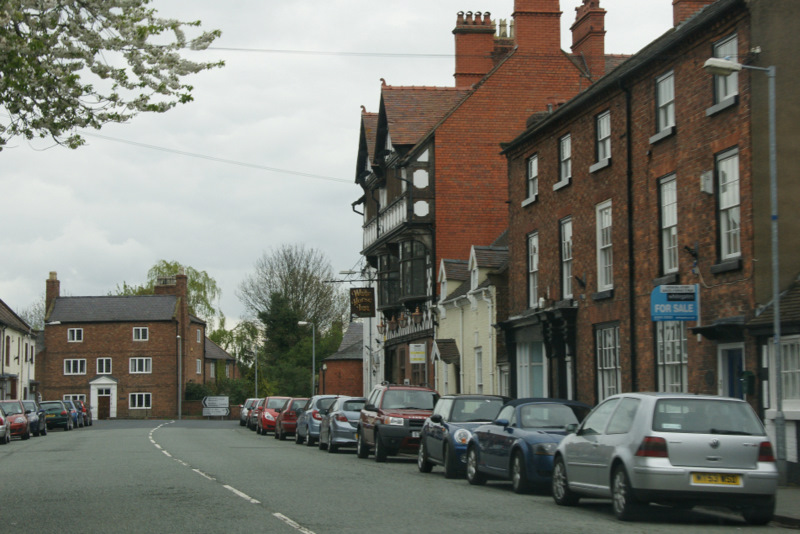
- The main street of Overton-on-Dee

- Location within Wrexham
- Population: 1,382 (2011)
- OS grid reference: SJ372417
- Community: Overton
- Principal area: Wrexham
- Preserved county: Clwyd
- Country: Wales
- Sovereign state: United Kingdom
- Post town: WREXHAM
- Postcode district: LL13
- Dialling code: 01978
- Police: North Wales
- Fire: North Wales
- Ambulance: Welsh
- UK Parliament: Wrexham
- Senedd Cymru – Welsh Parliament: Clwyd South
- List of places UK Wales Wrexham 52.969°N 2.935°W Map of the community

Overton (Welsh: Owrtyn) or Overton-on-Dee is a village and community in Wrexham County Borough, Wales. A former borough and market town, it is situated close to the Welsh-English border on the edge of an escarpment that winds its way around the course of the River Dee, from which Overton-on-Dee derives its name.

The community of Overton, which also includes the village of Lightwood Green and a number of small hamlets including Knolton, had a total population of 1,276 at the 2001 census, increasing to 1,382 at the 2011 Census.

== Geography ==
Overton is 7 miles (11 km) from Wrexham and exactly 22 miles (35 km) from both Chester and Shrewsbury. Its neighbouring villages are Bangor-on-Dee and Penley whilst the small towns of Ellesmere and Ruabon are only a short distance away.

The hamlet of Overton Bridge is a distinct settlement west of the village at grid reference SJ356426 above the Dee and the road bridge that carries the A528 road across the river.

== History ==
The settlement is not mentioned in the Domesday Book, but was first recorded in 1195, via a 14th-century source, as Ouerton. Its name was also recorded as Overtone in 1201, Awtun, in the 14th century and Ortyn in the 15th, all of which are forms of a name meaning "settlement on the bank [of the Dee]". A castle was built here in the 12th century by Madog ap Maredudd, a prince of Powys: Overton was granted the right to a weekly market and annual fair in 1279 by the English king Edward I and became a borough by royal charter in 1292, at which time 56 taxpayers lived there, and was later referred to as a "market town". One of Overton's earliest appearances in history was as one of the first targets of the revolt of 1294–95, led by Madog ap Llywelyn.

Overton is situated in a former exclave of the traditional county of Flintshire known as Maelor Saesneg (English: "English Maelor"). In 1536, under the rule of Henry VIII, it was included into the county of Flintshire, forming the Hundred of Maelor. Although part of Flintshire, Overton was within an exclave, surrounded by Cheshire, Shropshire and Denbighshire, and became the administrative centre of the area, often referred to as Flintshire Detached, which included the villages of Bangor on Dee, Bettisfield, Bronington, Hanmer, Knolton, Penley, Tybroughton, Willington and Worthenbury.

In 1887 a Boundary Commission was appointed to review the boundaries of counties in England and Wales. At an inquiry in Overton, it was found that most of the population of the area favoured it becoming part of Shropshire and this was later supported by resolution of the Flintshire justices of the peace. However, when local government legislation was introduced no change was made.

Under the Local Government Act 1894 the area became Overton Rural District, remaining as a detached part of Flintshire until 1974.

Between 1974 and 1996 Overton was administered as part of the short-lived county of Clwyd. The community (parish) and county boundary between it and Erbistock (in historic Denbighshire) is, in part, on the west side of the river due to oxbow formation in the river. It is now in Wrexham borough.

== St Mary the Virgin Church and its yew trees ==
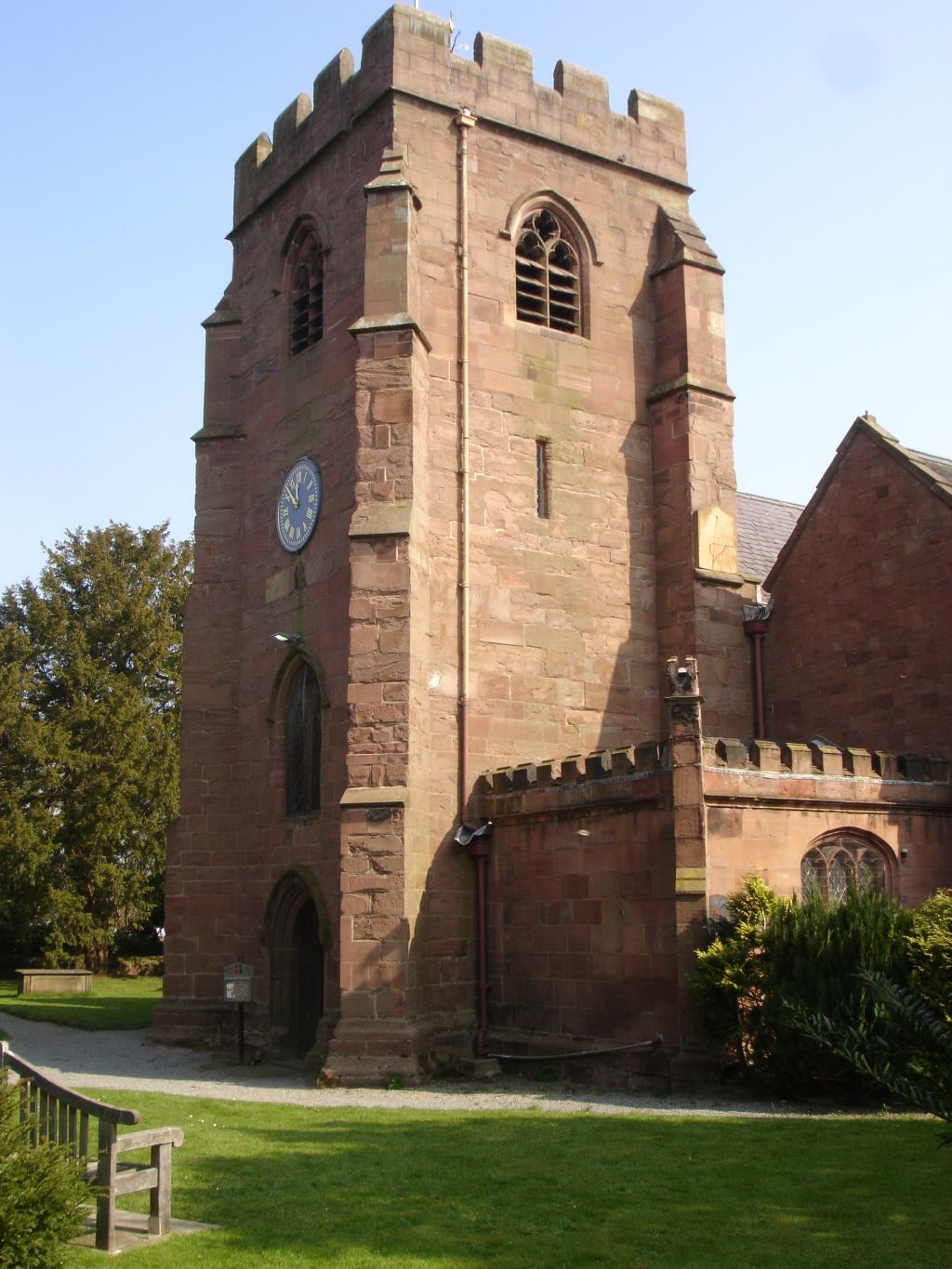
St Mary the Virgin Church which dominates the high street

The church of St Mary the Virgin dominates the high street. The churchyard is designated as one of the Registered historic parks and gardens in Wrexham County Borough. It is famous for twenty-one yew trees planted around its perimeter. Yew trees are difficult to date, but the oldest ones at Overton are undoubtedly ancient. At 1,500 to 2,000 years old, the oldest tree predates the church, whose earliest stonework is probably Norman.

The yew trees are traditionally one of the Seven Wonders of Wales and are commemorated in an anonymously written rhyme:

Pistyll Rhaeadr and Wrexham steeple,
Snowdon's mountain without its people,
Overton yew trees, St Winefride wells,
Llangollen bridge, and Gresford bells.

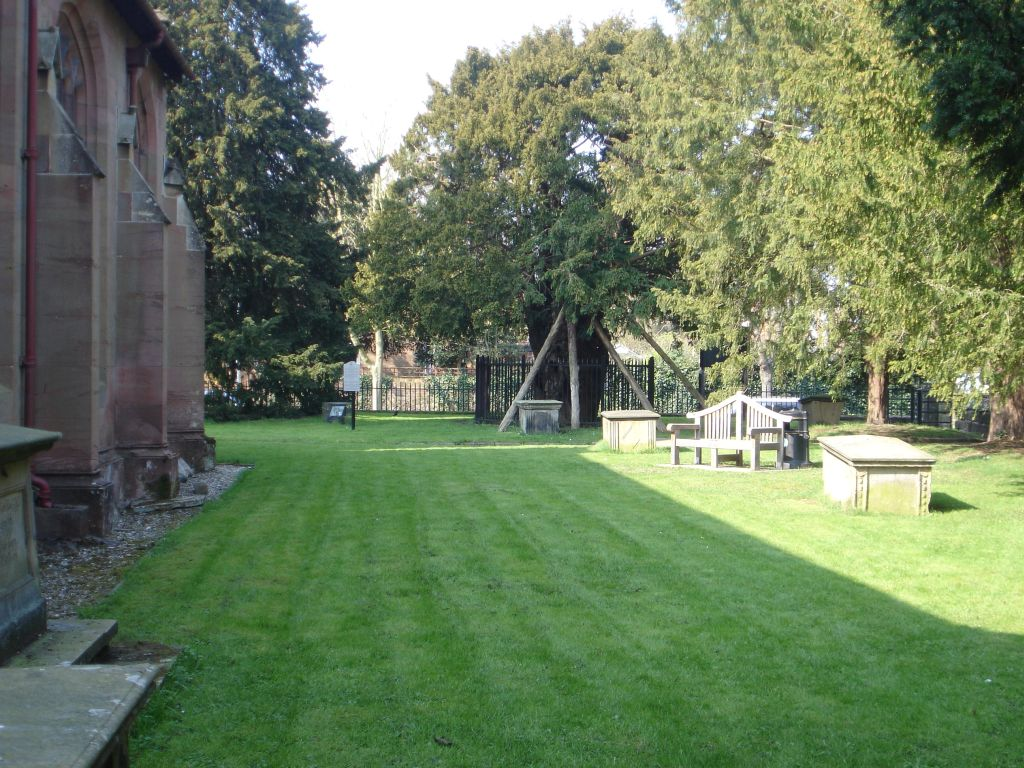
Some of the yew trees within the churchyard

In 1992 the village celebrated the 700th anniversary of the granting of a Royal Charter to Overton by Edward I in 1292 with a royal visit from Elizabeth II, who planted a new yew tree.

== Buildings and heritage ==
Overton has a fine collection of 18th and 19th-century buildings, many of which are listed as buildings of architectural or historic interest. Even the old telephone box has been "listed". The village centre is also designated as a Conservation Area.

Most of the village was once owned by the Bryn-y-pys Estate. The 1848 sale particulars, with 4,300 acres (17 km^{2}) and a majority of the houses and farms in the village, run to several pages. It was made clear that the estate wielded "Great Political Influence", as without the secret ballot at general elections, the purchaser, who would be virtually everyone's landlord, was guaranteed of a place in Parliament.

There are several interesting buildings in the village including: the "Cocoa and Reading Rooms", a terracotta building of 1890, built to promulgate temperance, now the library; almshouses and a Victorian village pump.

== Governance ==
An electoral ward in the same name exists. This ward stretches south east to Maelor South and at the 2011 census had a total population of 3,315.

== Recreation ==
The village has the usual sporting recreational areas of cricket, football, bowls and tennis. Overton is also an excellent rendezvous point for walkers as it finds itself on the map of the Maelor Way, a 24 mile (38 km) long-distance footpath; this in turn links up with Offa's Dyke Path National Trail at Bronygarth and the Sandstone Trail, Llangollen Canal, South Cheshire Way, and the Marches Way.

== People ==
- St. Richard Gwyn (ca. 1537 – 15 October 1584), Overton village schoolmaster, Elizabethan era composer of Welsh poetry, and Roman Catholic martyr. Canonised in 1970 by Pope Paul VI as one of the Forty Martyrs of England and Wales.
