= Grade II listed buildings in Hanmer, Wrexham =

Map of the community in Wrexham County Borough.

In the United Kingdom, the term listed building refers to a building or other structure officially designated as being of special architectural, historical, or cultural significance; Grade II structures are those considered to be "buildings of special interest which justify every effort being made to preserve them". Listing was begun by a provision in the Town and Country Planning Act 1947. Once listed, strict limitations are imposed on the modifications allowed to a building's structure or fittings. In Wales, the authority for listing under the Planning (Listed Buildings and Conservation Areas) Act 1990 rests with Cadw.

This is a list of the 37 Grade II listed buildings in the community of Hanmer, in Wrexham County Borough.

Name	Location Grid Ref. (Note: Sometimes known as OSGB36, the grid reference is based on the British national grid reference system used by the Ordnance Survey.) Geo-coordinates	Date Listed	Type/Function	Notes	Reference Number	Image
Arowry House	Hanmer; SJ4579739129; 52.946794°N 2.8081084°W	15 November 2005	Domestic		86929	–
Boundary wall and gateway to NE side of Bettisfield Park	Hanmer; SJ4625837662; 52.933654°N 2.8010048°W	15 November 2005	Domestic		86930	–
Brook Farmhouse	Hanmer; SJ4684340026; 52.954961°N 2.7926907°W	16 November 1962	Transport		1661	–
Bryn Newydd	Hanmer; SJ4279941776; 52.970274°N 2.8531885°W	15 November 2005	Domestic		86932	–
Bryn Rossett (West View House)	Hanmer; SJ4638340966; 52.963365°N 2.799693°W	16 November 1962			1663	–
Chadwell and Hanmer Village Stores	Hanmer; SJ4551939619; 52.95117°N 2.8123278°W	15 November 2005	Religious, Ritual and Funerary		86933	–
Cottage and butcher's shop	Hanmer; SJ4552739751; 52.952357°N 2.812231°W	15 November 2005	Religious, Ritual and Funerary		86934	–
Croxton Farmhouse	Hanmer; SJ4590041279; 52.966129°N 2.8069355°W	15 November 2005	Religious, Ritual and Funerary		86935	–
Farm Buildings at Bettisfield Park Home Farm	Hanmer; SJ4607137623; 52.933285°N 2.8037802°W	03 August 2006	Domestic		87498	–
Gates, gate piers and railings at NE entrance to Gredington Park	Hanmer; SJ4514639525; 52.950287°N 2.8178629°W	16 November 1962	Health and Welfare		1666	–
Gravestone of Edward Lloyd in Hanmer churchyard	Hanmer; SJ4547339727; 52.952136°N 2.8130306°W	15 November 2005	Domestic		86937	–
Halghton Forge	Hanmer; SJ4172443445; 52.985159°N 2.8694947°W	15 November 2005	Religious, Ritual and Funerary		86938	–
Halghton Lodge Farmhouse	Hanmer; SJ4195443106; 52.982137°N 2.8660083°W	15 November 2005	Gardens, Parks and Urban Spaces		86939	–
Hanmer Arms	Hanmer; SJ4552639808; 52.95287°N 2.8122555°W	07 February 1989	Domestic		1726	–
Hanmer Hall Farmhouse	Hanmer; SJ4603339988; 52.954539°N 2.80474°W	16 November 1962	Gardens, Parks and Urban Spaces		1667	–
Hanmer Voluntary Primary School	Hanmer; SJ4541639757; 52.9524°N 2.8138839°W	16 November 1962	Domestic		1660	–
Kitchen garden walls, including former vine house, greenhouses and bothies at Bettisfield Park	Hanmer; SJ4619337509; 52.932273°N 2.8019464°W	15 November 2005			86942	–
Lower House	Hanmer; SJ4395140144; 52.955727°N 2.8357538°W	15 November 2005	Domestic		86943	–
Magpie Cottage	Hanmer; SJ4551639595; 52.950954°N 2.8123684°W	16 November 1962	Domestic		1668	–
Mere House	Hanmer; SJ4519739677; 52.951658°N 2.8171296°W	12 January 2006			86957	–
Multi-purpose farm building at Bryn Newydd	Hanmer; SJ4279541816; 52.970633°N 2.8532551°W	15 November 2005	Domestic		86944	–
Multi-purpose farm building at Halghton Lodge	Hanmer; SJ4193443081; 52.98191°N 2.8663016°W	15 November 2005			86945	–
Nickson family tombs, including railings, in Hanmer churchyard	Hanmer; SJ4548139719; 52.952065°N 2.8129102°W	15 November 2005	Domestic		86946	–
Onion tower and attached walls at Bettisfield Park	Hanmer; SJ4616537586; 52.932962°N 2.8023757°W	15 November 2005	Domestic		86947	–
Pandy Holding	Hanmer; SJ4231143096; 52.982086°N 2.8606898°W	15 November 2005	Commercial		86948	–
Peartree Farmhouse	Hanmer; SJ4329741797; 52.970516°N 2.8457777°W	16 November 1962	Domestic		14653	–
Revetment and balustrade to forecourt and formal garden of Bettisfield Park	Hanmer; SJ4599237475; 52.931947°N 2.8049307°W	15 November 2005	Domestic		86949	–
Sundial in Hanmer churchyard	Hanmer; SJ4545339716; 52.952035°N 2.8133264°W	15 November 2005	Industrial		86931	–
The Cottage	Hanmer; SJ4552139723; 52.952105°N 2.8123155°W	16 November 1962			1662	–
The Dukes	Hanmer; SJ4369841018; 52.963556°N 2.8396716°W	16 November 1962	Domestic		1655	–
The Vicarage	Hanmer; SJ4549239721; 52.952084°N 2.8127468°W	16 November 1962	Industrial		1659	–
Tomb of Henry Parry in Hanmer churchyard	Hanmer; SJ4547439728; 52.952145°N 2.8130159°W	15 November 2005	Domestic		86951	–
Top House Farmhouse	Hanmer; SJ4585239132; 52.946826°N 2.8072905°W	15 November 2005	Religious, Ritual and Funerary		86952	–
Top Lodge	Hanmer; SJ4635037558; 52.932729°N 2.799619°W	15 November 2005	Gardens, Parks and Urban Spaces		86953	–
Water tower at Bettisfield Park	Hanmer; SJ4608237572; 52.932828°N 2.803608°W	15 November 2005	Domestic		86954	–
West View	Hanmer; SJ4447640971; 52.963215°N 2.828082°W	15 November 2005	Domestic		86955	–
Willington Lodge, including attached farm buildings	Hanmer; SJ4517941349; 52.966685°N 2.8176811°W	15 November 2005	Commercial		86956	–

== See also ==
- Grade II listed buildings in Wrexham County Borough
- Grade II listed buildings in Bangor-on-Dee
- Grade II listed buildings in Bronington
- Grade II listed buildings in Maelor South
- Grade II listed buildings in Overton-on-Dee
- Grade II listed buildings in Willington Worthenbury
