= List of counties of Wales by population in 1971 =

This is a list of historic counties of Wales, ordered by population as at the 1971 census.

Rank	County	Total population
1	Glamorgan	1,258,738
2	Monmouthshire	462,172
3	Denbighshire	185,193
4	Flintshire	175,769
5	Carmarthenshire	162,568
6	Caernarfonshire	123,065
7	Pembrokeshire	98,973
8	Anglesey	59,756
9	Cardiganshire	54,877
10	Brecknockshire	53,381
11	Montgomeryshire	43,131
12	Merionethshire	35,329
13	Radnorshire	18,277
