= List of historic counties of Wales by area in 1891 =

This is a list of the historic counties of Wales as recorded by the 1891 census, ordered by their area.

Rank	County	Area (acres)
1	Carmarthenshire	587,816 (2,378 km^{2})
2	Glamorgan	516,959 (2,092 km^{2})
3	Montgomeryshire	510,111 (2,064 km^{2})
4	Brecknockshire	475,224 (1,923 km^{2})
5	Cardiganshire	440,630 (1,783 km^{2})
6	Merionethshire	427,810 (1,731 km^{2})
7	Denbighshire	423,477 (1,713 km^{2})
8	Pembrokeshire	395,151 (1,599 km^{2})
9	Caernarfonshire	361,097 (1,461 km^{2})
10	Monmouthshire	341,688 (1,382 km^{2})
11	Radnorshire	301,164 (1,218 km^{2})
12	Anglesey	175,836 (711 km^{2})
13	Flintshire	164,050 (663 km^{2})
