= Knolton =

Hamlet in Wrexham County Borough, Wales

Coordinates: 52.942529°N 2.924593°W

- Location within Wrexham
- OS grid reference: SJ3738
- Community: Maelor South
- Principal area: Wrexham
- Country: Wales
- Sovereign state: United Kingdom
- Post town: WREXHAM
- Postcode district: LL
- Police: North Wales
- Fire: North Wales
- Ambulance: Welsh

Knolton (Welsh pronunciation) is a hamlet in Wrexham County Borough, Wales, close to the border with Shropshire, England. It is in Overton parish, and is 5½ miles ENE of Chirk.

The Kynaston family has its seat at Knolton Hall, a Grade II* listed building.

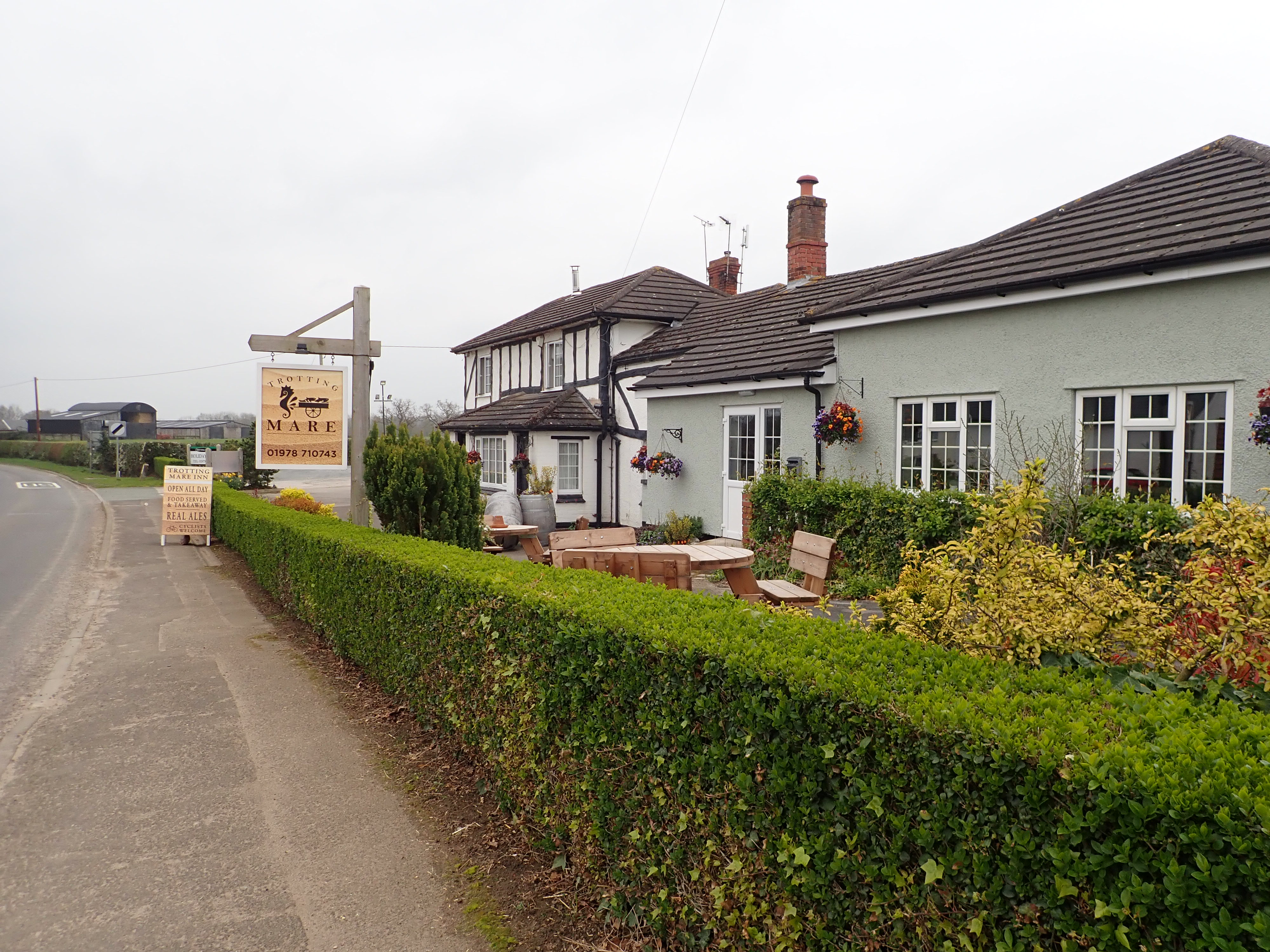
The Trotting Mare, Knolton

The Trotting Mare Inn, a public house in Knolton, has the distinction of being in Wales, while its adjacent car park is in England.
