= Maelor Saesneg =

Area of Wrexham County Borough, east of the River Dee

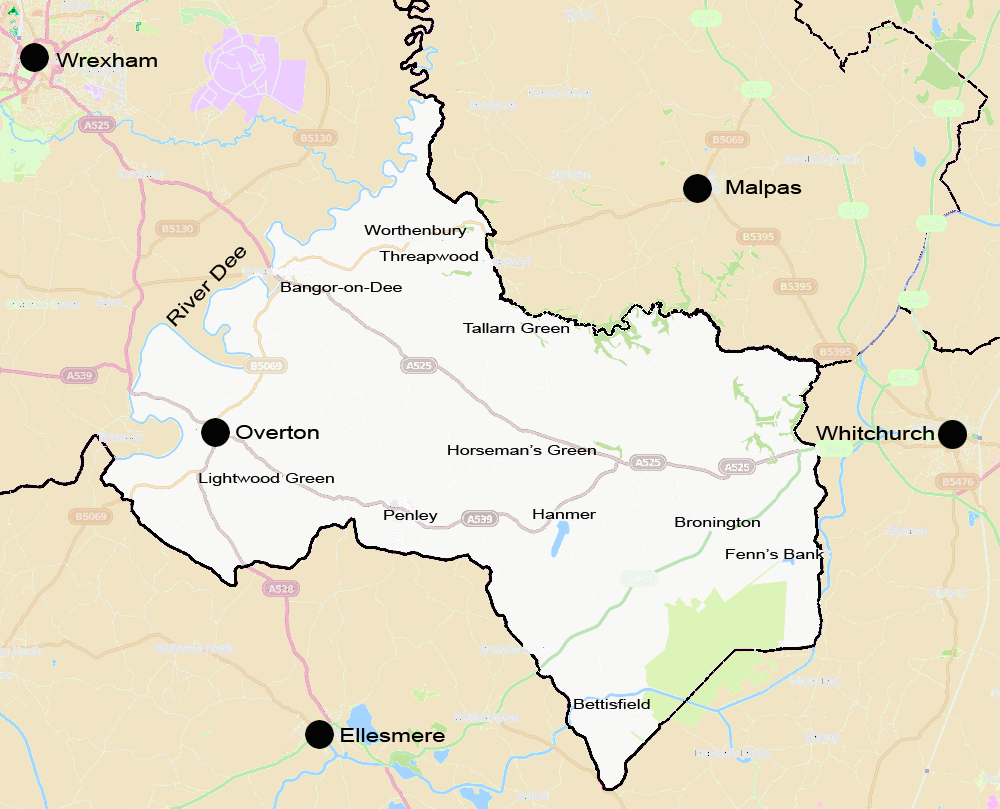
Maelor Saesneg shown with the nearest large settlements

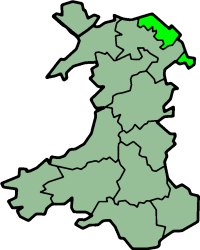
Maelor Saesneg shown as a detached portion of the historic county of Flintshire

Maelor Saesneg, also known as English Maelor, comprises one half of the Maelor region on the Welsh side of the Wales-England border, being the area of the Maelor east of the River Dee. The region has changed counties several times, previously being part of Cheshire and later a detached portion of Flintshire. The area is currently in Wales, despite its name, and administered as part of Wrexham County Borough.

The name Maelor is an old Welsh word: it can be translated as "land of the prince", from mael "prince" and llawr "low ground", "region". Malaur Saisnec appears in a document as early as 1202: Saesneg ("English") is believed to relate specifically to the area's religious administration, as it was historically part of the ancient Diocese of Lichfield and Chester.

== History ==
At the time of the Roman invasion, the area was part of the region occupied by the Cornovii, one of the Celtic tribes of ancient Britain, on the border with the Deceangli tribe across the River Dee to the west. Following Roman Britain, and the emergence of various petty kingdoms, the region was ruled within the Kingdom of Powys until falling to the Kingdom of Mercia by the late 8th century under Aethelbald.

At the time of the Domesday Book (1086), it was part of the Earldom of Chester listed as part of the Cheshire Hundred of Duddestan; Bettisfield was the largest settlement, with 28 households.

The English Maelor is first recorded as a separate lordship from the Maelor in 1202. It was inherited by Gruffydd Maelor II in 1236 when his father, Madog ap Gruffydd Maelor, died and his kingdom was divided between his five sons. Gruffydd married Emma Audley of Shropshire, who was subsequently dispossessed of the lands by Llywelyn the Great on the death of Gruffudd in 1269.

Llywelyn ap Gruffudd surrendered the English Maelor to Edward I in 1282 following military campaign. Edward awarded it to Queen Eleanor. In 1309, under Edward II, it was granted to Queen Isabella. In 1397, under Richard II of England, it merged with the County Palatine of Chester to form "the Principality of Chester". In 1398, it was restored to an earldom by Henry IV.

In 1536, under the rule of Henry VIII, the area became an exclave of the county of Flintshire, surrounded by Cheshire, Shropshire and Denbighshire, as the Hundred of Maelor, later often called "Flintshire Detached". The Welsh Maelor, or Maelor Gymraeg, was included in Denbighshire. The English Maelor's market town and administrative centre was Overton: its constituent parts were the parishes of Bangor on Dee and Worthenbury, the three townships of Overton Villa, Overton Foreign and Knolton in the parish of Overton, Penley township from the Shropshire parish of Ellesmere, Iscoyd township in the Shropshire parish of Malpas, and Wallington, Halghton, Tybroughton, Bronington, Hanmer and Bettisfield townships in the parish of Hanmer.

In 1887, a Boundary Commission was appointed to review these nationally. At an inquiry at Overton, it was found that most of the population favoured becoming part of Shropshire, and this was later supported by a resolution of the Flintshire justices of the peace. However, when local government legislation was introduced, no change was made.

Under the Local Government Act 1894 the area became Overton Rural District. The administrative county of Flintshire was abolished in 1974 under the Local Government Act 1972, and the area became part of Clwyd. Since Clwyd was itself abolished in 1996 under the Local Government (Wales) Act 1994, the area has been administered as part of Wrexham County Borough.
