= St Deiniol's Church, Worthenbury =

Church in Wrexham County Borough, Wales

St Deiniol's Church
- St Deiniol's Church, Worthenbury
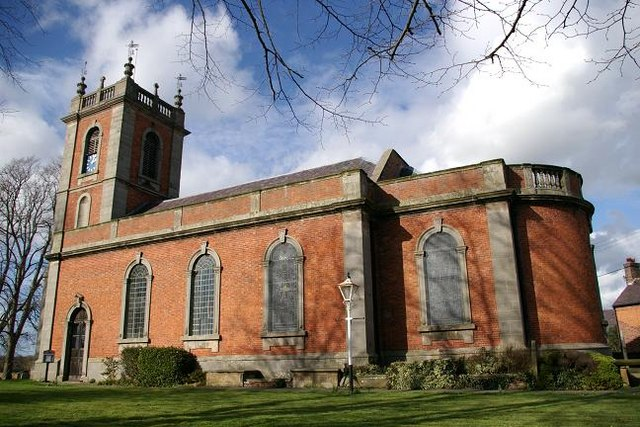

- Location in Wrexham County Borough
- 53°1′2″N 2°8′6″W
- Country: Wales
- Denomination: Church in Wales

History
- Dedication: St Deiniol

Architecture
- Heritage designation: Grade I
- Designated: 16 November 1962
- Architectural type: Church

St Deiniol's Church, Worthenbury, is a Grade I listed church situated to the west of the centre of the village, a short distance along Church Road within a walled graveyard. There is a clear view of the church across open meadows on the approach to the village from the south on the B5069 road. The church is listed on the National Monuments Record of Wales, and was formerly the parish church of Worthenbury parish. Currently, the church is under the care of the Friends of Friendless Churches.

== History ==
Formerly a parish church, St Deiniol's is no longer active in the Church in Wales, but is listed in their Heritage Record as open to visitors and worship. In 2025 it was transferred to the care of Friends of Friendless Churches so that it can remain open to visitors.

The present Georgian structure was designed by Richard Trubshaw and completed in 1739 for £810. The earliest religious building on the site is believed to have been a 6th-century chapelry to Bangor-is-y-coed monastery. The present church replaces one dating from 1557. Significant repairs were undertaken in 1951, including re-roofing, due to death watch beetle damage.

== Exterior ==
The church is largely built of red brick with Cefn-Mawr sandstone dressing in Georgian style and is described in the listing as an "exceptionally fine" example of its kind. It has a square three-storey tower with bell chamber above, and the roof is hidden by stone parapets.

During repairs carried out in 2025 by Friends of Friendless Churches, it was discovered that some of the masonry to the tower had in fact been replaced with cast concrete at an earlier date. To the east end is a semi-circular apse and a three-storey tower to the west. The roofs are slate, and external ornamentation is restrained – limited to balustrading on the tower and part of the apse parapets. The tower is crowned with urn-shaped pinnacles at each corner. The tower has been reinforced and the brickwork has been repointed.

== Interior ==
In contrast to the simplicity of the exterior, the interior is richly decorated. The nave ceilings are plainly plastered but framed with a deep, moulded cornice. The chancel ceiling is far more elaborate, adorned with Rococo plaster flourishes, a golden sunburst, a dove, and whimsical clouds. The mostly 18th century box-pews, have local families' crests. The west chancel gallery bears a 1740 Royal coat-of arms. The font is Georgian marble. Friends of Friendless Churches has removed the previous carpeting in order to complete repairs to the stone flooring, and has repaired cracks to the interior walls in addition to replastering, painting, and glazing.

The east window, a glorious jumble of fragments, contains elements from the 1393 Jesse Window from the chapel of Winchester College. Created by Thomas Glazier of Oxford in the late 14th century, it was commissioned by William of Wykeham and depicted the Tree of Jesse, the visualisation of Christ’s lineage. It is believed that these fragments were installed in St Deiniol’s after a restoration project took place in Winchester between 1821 and 1828, where parts of the original window were dispersed and reused by the firm handling the project.

== See also ==
- Grade I listed buildings in Wrexham County Borough
