= Saint Dunod =

Abbot of Bangor-on-Dee

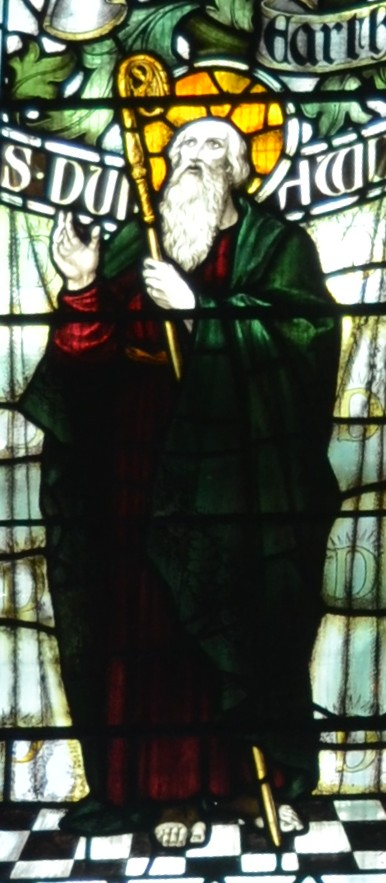

Abbot
- Born: mid 6th century
- Died: early 7th century
- Venerated in: Church in Wales; Eastern Orthodox Church; Roman Catholic Church
- Canonized: Pre-congregation

Saint Dunod (variously spelled Dinooth, Dinothus and Dunawd) was the first Abbot of Bangor Iscoed of north-east Wales.

== Early life ==
Originally a North British chieftain, Dunod was driven by reverses of fortune into Wales. He was married to Dwywai, daughter of Lleënog, and they had three sons: Deiniol, Cynwyl and Gwarthan.

== Religious life ==
Under the patronage of Cyngen Glodrydd, Prince of Powys, Dunod and his sons were said to have founded the monastery of Bangor on the River Dee. The community at Bangor was very numerous, and the laus perennis was established there. The Triads say there were 2400 monks, who in turn, 100 each hour, sang the Divine Service day and night. It was an important religious centre in the 5th and 6th centuries. The monastery was destroyed in about 613 by the Anglo-Saxon king Æthelfrith of Northumbria after he defeated the Welsh at the Battle of Chester. A number of the monks then transferred to Bardsey Island.

Dunod is best known as being the only Welsh ecclesiastic mentioned by name in Bede's Historia ecclesiastica gentis Anglorum. Bede states that Dunod (Dunawd) was still abbot of Bangor Iscoed at the time of the second meeting of Augustine of Canterbury with the seven Welsh bishops at 'Augustine's Oak' (possibly Aust in Gloucestershire or Cressage in Shropshire) in 602 or 603. George Cyprian Alston, writing in the Catholic Encyclopedia doubts that Dunod attended the meeting. While delegates from Bangor did attended the conference, Dunod would have been far advanced in years, and the journey from North Wales to the Lower Severn would have been a difficult one for an aged man.

He is often identified with Dunod Fawr ap Pabo Post Prydain, a Brythonic King ruling somewhere in the North of Britain and father of Saint Deiniol, the first Bishop of Bangor in Gwynedd. However, this is chronologically unlikely.

== Legacy ==
St. Dunod's feast day is 7th September. The primary school in Bangor-on-Dee is named in his honour; Ysgol Sant Dunawd.
