= Iscoyd Park =

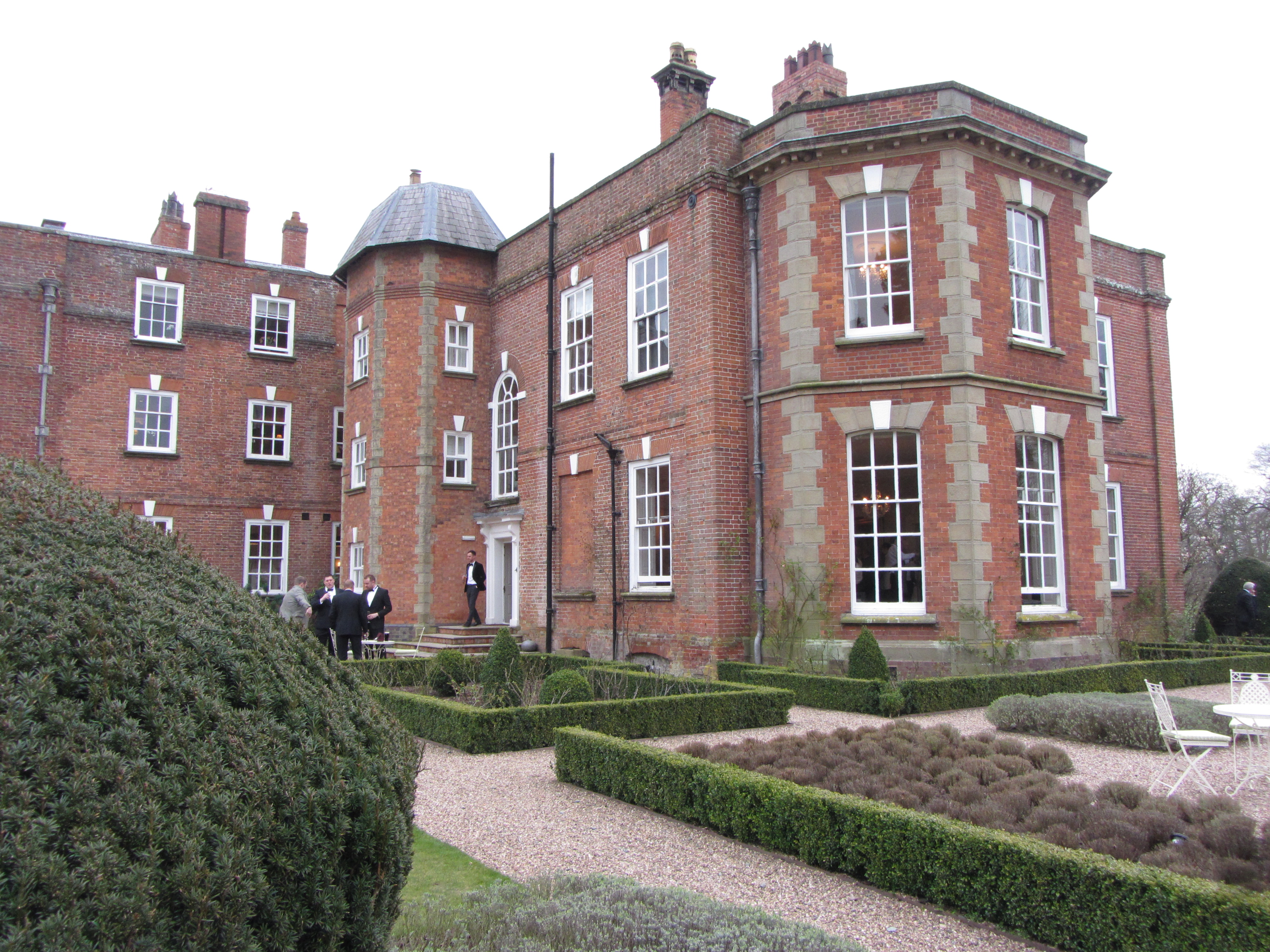

- Location within Wrexham
- 52.9729°N 2.7392°W
- Type: mansion
- Location: Whitewell, Wrexham, Wales
- OS grid reference: SJ 5045 4198

History
- Built: early 18th century

Listed Building – Grade II*
- Official name: Iscoyd Park
- Designated: 16 November 1962
- Reference no.: 1670
- Community: Bronington

Iscoyd Park is a three-storey redbrick country house in Wrexham County Borough, Wales. It has a slate roof built in the early 18th century. It was sold in 1737 to William Hanmer. The house and estate was then purchased by Philip Lake Godsal in 1843 and remains in the Godsal family to this day. Iscoyd was designated a Grade II* listed building in 1962 as a well-preserved country house. It supported by a range of 18th- and 19th-century service buildings including a park and gardens, outbuildings, coach house, corn house, kennels, laundry, piggery and stables. The dovecote has a pyramidal slate roof. The house is now run by Philip Langley Godsal and his wife Susie, who took over the house from his father Philip Caulfeild Godsal (High Sheriff of Clwyd 1993) in 2009 and began a complete refurbishment. This was funded by operating as a wedding and events business but also remains the Godsal family home. Iscoyd Park has won various awards for the restoration of the house and outbuildings, including the Historic Houses Association and Sotheby's Restoration Award, the Hudson's Heritage Award for Best Wedding Venue, Hudson's Heritage Award for Best Accommodation, Wales Gold Award for Best Services Accommodation, Bridebook's Best National Wedding venue.

The parks and gardens are listed as Grade II in the Cadw/ICOMOS Register of Parks and Gardens of Special Historic Interest in Wales.
