= Bettisfield =

Village in Wrexham County Borough, Wales

Coordinates: 52.913°N 2.805°W

Bettisfield: Welsh: Llys Bedydd (Note: Alternatively the English name may be used in Welsh, following the Welsh Language Commissioner's standardisation policy.)
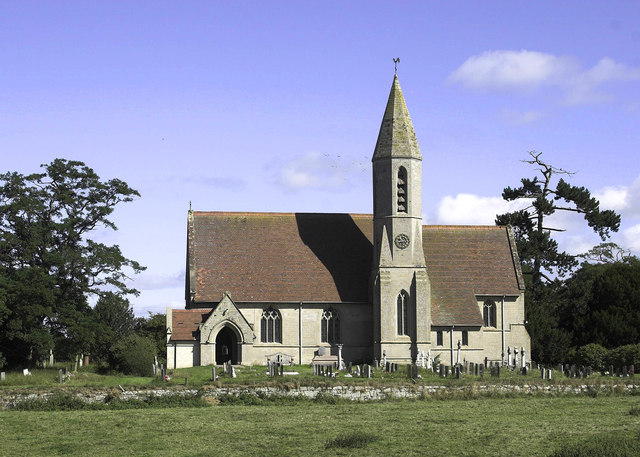
- Bettisfield Church

- Location within Wrexham
- OS grid reference: SJ459351
- Community: Maelor South
- Principal area: Wrexham
- Preserved county: Clwyd
- Country: Wales
- Sovereign state: United Kingdom
- Post town: WHITCHURCH
- Postcode district: SY13
- Dialling code: 01948
- Police: North Wales
- Fire: North Wales
- Ambulance: Welsh
- UK Parliament: Wrexham
- Senedd Cymru – Welsh Parliament: Clwyd South

Bettisfield (Welsh: Llys Bedydd; standardised: Bettisfield) is a village of about 150 dwellings in Wrexham County Borough, Wales and stands on the Wales-England border, and in the community of Maelor South. It lies south of the Llangollen Canal on the border with Shropshire, England within the historic English Maelor region which was formerly part of the historic county of Flintshire. The village lies close to Fenn's, Whixall and Bettisfield Mosses, an area of peat bog which was declared a national nature reserve in 1996 because of its importance for wildlife. The English market towns of Whitchurch, Ellesmere and Wem each lie about 6 miles distant to the northeast, west and southeast respectively.

It is described in the Domesday Book (1086) within the Cheshire Hundred of Dudeston, recording 28 households and a value to Lord Edwin in 1066 of £18 9s, reducing to £3 in 1086.

The village no longer has a shop, post office, pub, smithy or baker.

Politician and poet John Hanmer, 1st Baron Hanmer (1809-1881) is buried in Bettisfield churchyard.
