= Maelor South =

Community in Wrexham County Borough, Wales

- Community
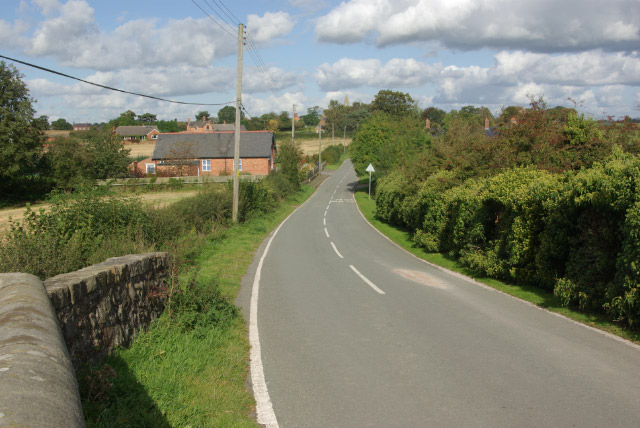
- Road through Bettisfield, Maelor South, from bridge over the Llangollen Canal.
- Principal area: Wrexham
- Country: Wales
- Sovereign state: United Kingdom
- Ambulance: Welsh
- List of places UK Wales Map of the community

Maelor South (Welsh: De Maelor) is a community in the area of Maelor Saesneg, Wrexham County Borough, Wales. It contains the villages of Penley and Bettisfield along with a number of other small hamlets and is represented by the Maelor South Community Council. At the time of the 2001 census, the community area had a total population of 1,137 people, increasing to 1,268 at the 2011 Census.

Until 1974 the area was part of the Maelor Rural District, an administrative division of Flintshire abolished under the terms of the Local Government Act 1972. The community of Maelor South, created under the same legislation, corresponded to the Rural District's former civil parishes of Penley and Bettisfield.
