= Grade II listed buildings in Bronington =

Map of the community in Wrexham County Borough.

In the United Kingdom, the term listed building refers to a building or other structure officially designated as being of special architectural, historical, or cultural significance; Grade II structures are those considered to be "buildings of special interest which justify every effort being made to preserve them". Listing was begun by a provision in the Town and Country Planning Act 1947. Once listed, strict limitations are imposed on the modifications allowed to a building's structure or fittings. In Wales, the authority for listing under the Planning (Listed Buildings and Conservation Areas) Act 1990 rests with Cadw.

This is a list of the 81 Grade II listed buildings in the community of Bronington, in Wrexham County Borough.

| Name | Location Grid Ref. (Note: Sometimes known as OSGB36, the grid reference is based on the British national grid reference system used by the Ordnance Survey.) Geo-coordinates | Date Listed | Type/Function | Notes | Reference Number | Image |
|---|---|---|---|---|---|---|
| 1 Hall Green Cottages | Bronington; SJ5034742148; 52.974371°N 2.7408646°W | 20 October 2005 | Domestic | | 85440 | – |
| 1 Iscoyd Cottages | Bronington; SJ5050441414; 52.967788°N 2.7384144°W | 20 October 2005 | Domestic | | 85441 | – |
| 1 Smokey Lane | Bronington; SJ4875041845; 52.971497°N 2.7645963°W | 20 October 2005 | Domestic | | 85442 | – |
| 1 Warren Cottages | Bronington; SJ4989841900; 52.9721°N 2.7475119°W | 20 October 2005 | | | 85443 | – |
| 2 Hall Green Cottages | Bronington; SJ5034142144; 52.974335°N 2.7409534°W | 20 October 2005 | Religious, Ritual and Funerary | | 85444 | – |
| 2 Iscoyd Cottages | Bronington; SJ5050941410; 52.967753°N 2.7383393°W | 20 October 2005 | Domestic | | 85445 | – |
| 2 Warren Cottages | Bronington; SJ4989141901; 52.972109°N 2.7476163°W | 20 October 2005 | Domestic | | 85446 | – |
| Barn and shippon at Gelli Farm | Bronington; SJ4632443738; 52.988274°N 2.8010321°W | 20 October 2005 | Domestic | | 85447 | – |
| Barn at Fenns Old Hall | Bronington; SJ5056439624; 52.951705°N 2.7372472°W | 20 October 2005 | Transport | | 85448 | – |
| Bronington war memorial | Bronington; SJ4910839413; 52.949672°N 2.7588829°W | 20 October 2005 | Memorial | | 85449 | – |
| Brunett Farmhouse and Brunett Annexe | Bronington; SJ4724742996; 52.981697°N 2.7871628°W | 16 November 1962 | Transport | | 1698 | – |
| Bryn Owen Cottage | Bronington; SJ5033842400; 52.976636°N 2.7410374°W | 20 October 2005 | Domestic | | 85450 | – |
| Carriage shelter at Whitewell Church | Bronington; SJ4945541375; 52.96734°N 2.7540258°W | 16 November 1962 | Commercial | | 1674 | – |
| Chapel House (former Bronington Chequer Methodist Chapel) | Bronington; SJ4944040813; 52.962287°N 2.7541612°W | 21 February 1994 | Domestic | | 14652 | – |
| Church Holding | Bronington; SJ4935741344; 52.967052°N 2.7554799°W | 20 October 2005 | Religious, Ritual and Funerary | | 85451 | – |
| Church of St Mary | Bronington; SJ4949741398; 52.96755°N 2.7534041°W | 16 November 1962 | Church | | 1669 | – |
| Church of the Holy Trinity | Bronington; SJ4912739202; 52.947777°N 2.758567°W | 16 November 1962 | Church | | 1653 | – |
| Coach house and granary on back drive to Iscoyd Park | Bronington; SJ5040642065; 52.973631°N 2.7399734°W | 20 October 2005 | Religious, Ritual and Funerary | | 85496 | – |
| Crabmill | Bronington; SJ4770440213; 52.956727°N 2.7799063°W | 20 October 2005 | Religious, Ritual and Funerary | | 85452 | – |
| Crofts Bank | Bronington; SJ4978840953; 52.963578°N 2.7490025°W | 20 October 2005 | Religious, Ritual and Funerary | | 85453 | – |
| Crossfield | Bronington; SJ5017742498; 52.977502°N 2.74345°W | 20 October 2005 | Religious, Ritual and Funerary | | 85454 | – |
| Eglwys Cross Cottage | Bronington; SJ4717040895; 52.962805°N 2.7879659°W | 16 November 1962 | | | 1699 | – |
| Farm buildings at Higher Lanes Farm | Bronington; SJ4805242738; 52.979457°N 2.7751326°W | 20 October 2005 | Domestic | | 85455 | – |
| Former laundry at Iscoyd Park | Bronington; SJ5044842049; 52.973491°N 2.7393455°W | 20 October 2005 | Domestic | | 85457 | – |
| Former shippons at Iscoyd Park | Bronington; SJ5046142058; 52.973573°N 2.7391533°W | 20 October 2005 | | | 85489 | – |
| Former stable and coach house at Green Dragon Farm | Bronington; SJ4816338725; 52.943397°N 2.7728359°W | 20 October 2005 | | | 85458 | – |
| Garden walls and bothy at The Gelli | Bronington; SJ4640343764; 52.988516°N 2.7998597°W | 20 October 2005 | Domestic | | 85459 | – |
| Gate Lodge | Bronington; SJ4979941135; 52.965215°N 2.7488671°W | 20 October 2005 | Domestic | | 85460 | – |
| Gate piers and attached walls to back drive to Iscoyd Park | Bronington; SJ5039742096; 52.973909°N 2.7401121°W | 20 October 2005 | Industrial | | 85461 | – |
| Gate piers at entrance to Iscoyd Park | Bronington; SJ5029841774; 52.971005°N 2.7415367°W | 20 October 2005 | Domestic | | 85462 | – |
| Gelli Farmhouse | Bronington; SJ4632343774; 52.988598°N 2.801053°W | 16 November 1962 | Transport | | 1675 | – |
| Green Dragon Farmhouse | Bronington; SJ4817438733; 52.94347°N 2.7726735°W | 20 October 2005 | Domestic | | 85463 | – |
| Hall Green Holding | Bronington; SJ5041942260; 52.975385°N 2.7398097°W | 20 October 2005 | Domestic | | 85464 | – |
| Henrwst | Bronington; SJ4987943034; 52.982291°N 2.7479709°W | 16 November 1962 | Commercial | | 1676 | – |
| Higher Barns Lodge | Bronington; SJ4778043677; 52.98787°N 2.7793352°W | 20 October 2005 | Gardens, Parks and Urban Spaces | | 85465 | – |
| Higher Lanes Bank Farmhouse | Bronington; SJ4847043080; 52.982571°N 2.7689624°W | 20 October 2005 | Domestic | | 85466 | – |
| Higher Lanes Farmhouse | Bronington; SJ4805542716; 52.979259°N 2.7750844°W | 20 October 2005 | Commercial | | 85467 | – |
| Higher Wych | Bronington; SJ4956743447; 52.985974°N 2.752682°W | 16 November 1962 | Domestic | | 1673 | – |
| Iscoyd Park war memorial | Bronington; SJ5026141934; 52.97244°N 2.7421122°W | 20 October 2005 | Domestic | | 85468 | – |
| Kennels at Iscoyd Park | Bronington; SJ5049542037; 52.973387°N 2.7386438°W | 20 October 2005 | | | 85469 | – |
| Kil Green Cottage | Bronington; SJ4924043425; 52.985746°N 2.757549°W | 20 October 2005 | Religious, Ritual and Funerary | | 85470 | – |
| Kitchen garden walls at Iscoyd Park | Bronington; SJ5041242120; 52.974126°N 2.7398925°W | 20 October 2005 | Education | | 85471 | – |
| Lane Farmhouse including attached garden wall | Bronington; SJ4657837602; 52.933147°N 2.7962346°W | 20 October 2005 | Domestic | | 85472 | – |
| Lower Wych Bridge (partly in Wigland Civil Parish, Cheshire) | Bronington; SJ4849544418; 52.9946°N 2.7688037°W | 20 October 2005 | Transport | | 85473 | – |
| Maesllwyn House | Bronington; SJ4808439223; 52.947865°N 2.7740913°W | 16 November 1962 | | | 1654 | – |
| Manure shed at Iscoyd Park | Bronington; SJ5046342044; 52.973447°N 2.7391214°W | 20 October 2005 | Domestic | | 85491 | – |
| Miles Cottage | Bronington; SJ4951741678; 52.970069°N 2.7531501°W | 20 October 2005 | | | 85474 | – |
| Moss Villa | Bronington; SJ4851437615; 52.933454°N 2.7674366°W | 20 October 2005 | Domestic | | 85475 | – |
| Multi-purpose farm block at The Hully | Bronington; SJ4789241931; 52.972187°N 2.7773851°W | 20 October 2005 | Domestic | | 85476 | – |
| Multi-purpose farm range at Higher Lanes Bank Farm | Bronington; SJ4849643103; 52.98278°N 2.7685788°W | 20 October 2005 | Domestic | | 85477 | – |
| New Hall Farmhouse | Bronington; SJ4897139803; 52.953164°N 2.7609833°W | 20 October 2005 | Domestic | | 85478 | – |
| Parkley Lodge | Bronington; SJ4932841680; 52.970069°N 2.7559644°W | 20 October 2005 | Domestic | | 85479 | – |
| Pigeon house at Iscoyd Park | Bronington; SJ5042942024; 52.973264°N 2.7396246°W | 20 October 2005 | Domestic | | 85480 | – |
| Redbrook Bridge (partly in Whitchurch Urban Civil Parish, Shropshire) | Bronington; SJ5124341230; 52.966202°N 2.7273843°W | 27 February 1992 | Religious, Ritual and Funerary | | 1743 | – |
| Redbrook House | Bronington; SJ5085440903; 52.963228°N 2.7331258°W | 16 November 1962 | Religious, Ritual and Funerary | | 1671 | – |
| Shippon and piggery at Higher Barns Lodge | Bronington; SJ4776843669; 52.987797°N 2.7795126°W | 20 October 2005 | Domestic | | 85481 | – |
| Shippon at 1 Smokey Lane | Bronington; SJ4876041854; 52.971579°N 2.7644488°W | 20 October 2005 | Domestic | | 85482 | – |
| Shippon at Brunett Farm | Bronington; SJ4720642963; 52.981396°N 2.787768°W | 20 October 2005 | Domestic | | 85483 | – |
| Shippon at Bryn Owen Cottage | Bronington; SJ5033642416; 52.976779°N 2.7410697°W | 20 October 2005 | Domestic | | 85484 | – |
| Shippon at Church Holding | Bronington; SJ4933741333; 52.966951°N 2.755776°W | 20 October 2005 | Domestic | | 85485 | – |
| Shippon at Crossfield | Bronington; SJ5018442509; 52.977601°N 2.7433475°W | 20 October 2005 | Domestic | | 85486 | – |
| Shippon at Hall Green Holding | Bronington; SJ5041342277; 52.975537°N 2.7399017°W | 20 October 2005 | Domestic | | 85487 | – |
| Shippon at Kil Green Cottage | Bronington; SJ4922243424; 52.985735°N 2.7578169°W | 20 October 2005 | Domestic | | 85488 | – |
| Signpost at road junction in Higher Wych | Bronington; SJ4964443513; 52.986575°N 2.7515455°W | 20 October 2005 | Water Supply and Drainage | | 85490 | – |
| Sniddlebog Cottage | Bronington; SJ4995141808; 52.971278°N 2.7467085°W | 20 October 2005 | Transport | | 85492 | – |
| Stable and cart house at Tybroughton Hall | Bronington; SJ4671442971; 52.981419°N 2.7950964°W | 20 October 2005 | Gardens, Parks and Urban Spaces | | 85494 | – |
| Stable and coach house at Iscoyd Park | Bronington; SJ5048042015; 52.973188°N 2.7388638°W | 20 October 2005 | Domestic | | 85495 | – |
| Stable at Gelli Farm | Bronington; SJ4634143755; 52.988429°N 2.8007817°W | 20 October 2005 | Religious, Ritual and Funerary | | 85497 | – |
| Stable at Iscoyd Park | Bronington; SJ5049542024; 52.973271°N 2.7386419°W | 20 October 2005 | Domestic | | 85498 | – |
| Stable at The Hully | Bronington; SJ4791941950; 52.972361°N 2.7769862°W | 20 October 2005 | Domestic | | 85493 | – |
| Stable at Whitewell Church | Bronington; SJ4945041371; 52.967303°N 2.7540996°W | 20 October 2005 | Domestic | | 85499 | – |
| Stable, groom's accommodation (The Flat) and dairy at Iscoyd Park | Bronington; SJ5045442009; 52.973132°N 2.73925°W | 20 October 2005 | Domestic | | 85500 | – |
| The Hully | Bronington; SJ4794241941; 52.972282°N 2.7766423°W | 16 November 1962 | | | 1700 | – |
| The Old Rectory | Bronington; SJ4967041105; 52.964933°N 2.7507828°W | 20 October 2005 | Domestic | | 85503 | – |
| The Vicarage, including attached garden wall | Bronington; SJ4909539227; 52.947998°N 2.7590471°W | 20 October 2005 | Domestic | | 85504 | – |
| Ty bach at Higher Lanes Bank Farm | Bronington; SJ4846343093; 52.982687°N 2.7690687°W | 20 October 2005 | Communications | | 85501 | – |
| Tybroughton Hall | Bronington; SJ4670042948; 52.981211°N 2.7953011°W | 20 October 2005 | Domestic | | 85505 | – |
| Walls, gate piers and gate between forecourt and service yard at Iscoyd Park | Bronington; SJ5048141998; 52.973036°N 2.7388463°W | 20 October 2005 | Commercial | | 85506 | – |
| Walls, gate piers and gates to forecourt and formal garden at Iscoyd Park | Bronington; SJ5045441942; 52.97253°N 2.7392398°W | 20 October 2005 | Agriculture and Subsistence | | 85507 | – |
| Whitewell Lodge, including arcaded screen to garden and wall to service yard | Bronington; SJ4981441311; 52.966798°N 2.7486711°W | 20 October 2005 | Domestic | | 85508 | – |
| Whitewell parish hall | Bronington; SJ4970241119; 52.965062°N 2.7503086°W | 20 October 2005 | | | 85509 | – |

== See also ==
- Grade II listed buildings in Wrexham County Borough
