= Flintshire (historic) =

Historic county of Wales

Coordinates: 53°15′N 3°10′W

Flintshire Sir y Fflint (Welsh)
- Historic county
- 1536–1974
- Flag adopted in 2015

- Area
  - 1831: 184,905 acres (748.28 km^{2})
- Population
  - 1831: 60,012
- Density
  - 1831: 0.32
- Status: Shire county under Justiciar of Chester (1284–1536); Non-administrative county (1536–1889); Administrative county (1889–1974); Historic county (non-administrative)
- Chapman code: FLN
- Government: Flintshire County Council (1889–1974)
  - HQ: County Hall, Mold
- History
  - First established by Statute of Rhuddlan: 1284
  - Established: 1536
  - Council established: 1889
  - Disestablished: 1974
Succeeded by
Clwyd
District of Alyn and Deeside
District of Delyn
District of Rhuddlan
Wrexham Maelor

Flintshire (Welsh: Sir y Fflint), also known as the County of Flint, was one of the thirteen counties of Wales that existed from 1536 until their abolition in 1974. It was located in the north-east of Wales. Flintshire was first created in 1284 by the Statute of Rhuddlan, until all counties were re-organised in 1536 into the set of thirteen.

Most of what was Flintshire was along the north-east coast of Wales, however the county was notable for having one of the few large county exclaves, the English Maelor (Maelor Saesneg), to survive the Counties (Detached Parts) Act 1844.

The administrative county of Flint was abolished under the Local Government Act 1972 on 1 April 1974, and became part of the new administrative area of Clwyd. The exclaves became part of Wrexham Maelor district – other parts formed the districts of Alyn and Deeside, Delyn and Rhuddlan. A unitary authority, also named Flintshire, was formed in 1996 under the Local Government (Wales) Act 1994, consisting only of the Alyn and Deeside and Delyn districts – the Wrexham Maelor parts now form part of Wrexham County Borough, with the former Rhuddlan district forming the northernmost part of the current Denbighshire unitary authority.

== Geography ==
The former county did not have the same boundaries as the current administrative county of Flintshire; in particular the former county included a large exclave called the English Maelor (Maelor Saesneg); it also included Prestatyn, Rhyl and St Asaph which are now administered as part of modern-day Denbighshire, as well as Bangor-on-Dee and Overton-on-Dee, which are administered as part of Wrexham County Borough. Other exclaves of the historic Flintshire included the manors of Marford and Hoseley, Abenbury Fechan and Bryn Estyn, all on the outskirts of Wrexham, and also a small part of the parish of Erbistock around the Boat Inn. These were all completely surrounded by the historic county of Denbighshire. Additionally, a small part of Flintshire, including the village of Sealand, was isolated across the River Dee when its course was changed to improve navigation.

Flintshire was a maritime county bounded to the north by the Irish Sea, to the north-east by the Dee estuary, to the east by Cheshire and to the south and southwest by Denbighshire. The Maelor Saesneg was bounded on the north-west by Denbighshire, on the north-east by Cheshire, and on the south by Shropshire. A medium height range of hills, the Clwydian Range (part of the Clwydian Range and Dee Valley Area of Outstanding Natural Beauty) ran in southeast-northwest direction along the border between the main part of Flintshire and Denbighshire, almost reaching the sea near Prestatyn. The Offa's Dyke Path ran along the crest of these hills.

The highest point in the historic county (county top) was found within these hills at Moel Famau, height 554.8 metres (1,820 ft), a notable viewpoint topped by the ruined remains of the Jubilee Tower, built in 1810 to commemorate the golden jubilee of King George III.

Flintshire was the smallest of what are now known as the historic counties in Wales. The coast along the Dee estuary was heavily developed by industry and the north coast much developed for tourism. The Clwydian Mountains occupied much of the west of the county. The highest point was Moel Famau (1,820 feet / 554 metres). The chief towns were Buckley, Connah's Quay, Flint, Hawarden, Holywell, Mold, Queensferry, and Shotton. The main rivers were the Dee (the estuary of which forms much of the coast) and the Clwyd. The main industries were manufacturing of aircraft components (Airbus), engines (Toyota), paper (Shotton Paper), steel processing (Corus), agriculture and tourism.

Places of special interest included castles in Flint, Hawarden, Rhuddlan and Ewloe, Greenfield Valley, St. Winefride's Well in Holywell and Wepre Park in Connah's Quay.

== Formation ==
The county was formed in 1284 under the terms of the Statute of Rhuddlan, following the defeat of the Principality of Wales. However, the region had been English since the 8th century, and formed part of Cheshire until it was captured by the Welsh in the late 12th century. In the 13th century, prior to its re-capture by the Normans, the region comprised:

- Tegeingl (Mercian Englefield), a Cantref in Gwynedd
- certain Commotes within the Cantref of Maelor, in Powys Fadog:
  - Maelor Saesneg (i.e., Saxon Maelor)
  - Yr Hob - i.e., Hopedale
  - Ystrad Alyn

Yr Hob and Ystrad Alyn, which been part of Gwynedd earlier in the century, had become sufficiently Welsh that they were regarded as another part of Welsh Maelor, rather than distinguished from it like English Maelor (Maelor Saesneg). They were not initially included in Flintshire, but instead became Marcher Lordships. Yr Hob became the Lordship of Hope, while Ystrad Alyn was split in two - the Lordships of Mold and Hawarden. Following the Laws in Wales Act (1536), these three Lordships were merged into Flintshire.

== Civil parishes ==
From the medieval period until 1974, Flintshire was divided into civil parishes for the purpose of local government; these in large part equated to ecclesiastical parishes (see the table below), most of which still exist as part of the Church in Wales. Chapelries are in italics.

Hundred	Parishes
Coleshill	Cilcain/Kilken • Halkyn/Helygain • Holywell/Treffynnon • Llaneurgain/Northop (Flint/Y Fflint) • Whitford/Chwitffordd
Maelor	Bangor Is-y-coed/Bangor-on-Dee^{W} (Worthenbury/Wrddymbre) • Hanmer^{W} • Hope/Yr Hôb • Iscoed/Whitewell^{W2} • Overton-on-Dee/Owrtyn^{W} • Penley/Llannerch Banna^{W1}
Mold	Penarlâg/Hawarden • Yr Wyddgrug/Mold (Nercwys/Nerquis • Treuddyn)
Prestatyn	Alltmelyd/Meliden^{D} • Diserth/Dyserth^{D} • Gwaenysgor • Llanasa • Trelawnyd/Newmarket
Rhuddlan	Bodfari^{D} • Caerwys • Cwm^{D} • Llanelwy/St Asaph^{D} • Nannerch • Rhuddlan^{D} • Tremeirchion^{D} • Ysgeifiog/Ysceifiog

^{1}chapelry to Ellesmere in Shropshire ^{2}chapelry to Malpas in Cheshire Most of these parishes are in the modern county of Flintshire, but those marked D are in Denbighshire, and those marked W are in Wrexham.

== County offices ==
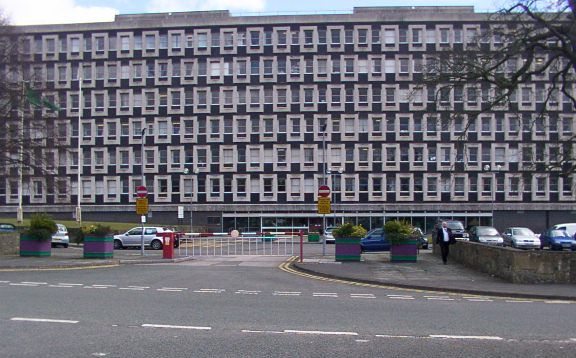
County Hall, Mold

Flintshire County Council established its base at the old County Hall in Chester Street in Mold. Additional facilities acquired included a local militia barracks (originally designed by Thomas Mainwaring Penson) which was converted for use as council offices in the late 1880s. After finding, in the 1930s, that the Chester Street facilities were too cramped, county leaders decided to procure modern facilities: the site they selected formed part of the Llwynegrin Hall estate which was acquired for the purpose. The new building, known as County Hall, Mold, was completed in October 1967.

== See also ==
- Flintshire
- List of Lord Lieutenants of Flintshire
- List of Custodes Rotulorum of Flintshire
- List of High Sheriffs of Flintshire
- Flintshire (UK Parliament constituency)
