= Bronington =

Village and community in Wrexham, Wales

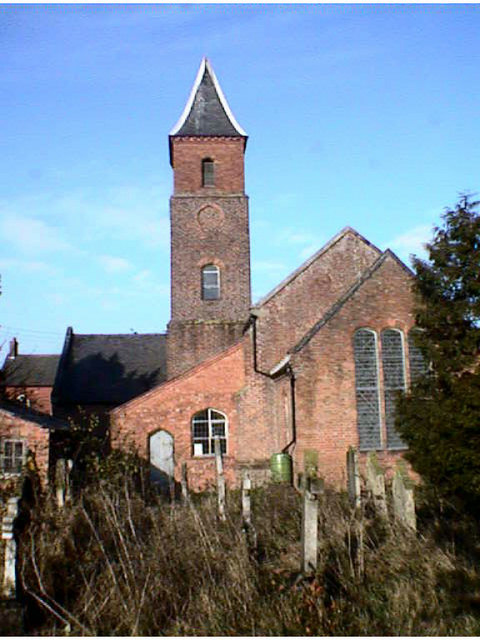
- Holy Trinity Church

- Location within Wrexham
- Population: 1,242 (2011 Census)
- OS grid reference: SJ484395
- Community: Bronington
- Principal area: Wrexham
- Preserved county: Clwyd
- Country: Wales
- Sovereign state: United Kingdom
- Post town: WHITCHURCH
- Postcode district: SY13
- Dialling code: 01948
- Police: North Wales
- Fire: North Wales
- Ambulance: Welsh
- UK Parliament: Wrexham
- Senedd Cymru – Welsh Parliament: Clwyd South
- List of places UK Wales Wrexham 52.950°N 2.769°W Map of the community

Bronington is a village and community in Wrexham County Borough, Wales, forming a large part of the Maelor Saesneg. Within the boundaries of the historic county of Flintshire, the community has an area of 3,482 hectares and a population of 1,228 (2001 Census), increasing to 1,242 at the 2011 Census.

The village church, Holy Trinity, was converted from a former brick tithe barn in 1836. To the north-east of the village is Iscoyd Park, a stately home with surrounding parkland built around 1740 and enlarged in the 19th century. South of the village is Fenn's Moss, an area of peat bog stretching over into Shropshire, which was declared a national nature reserve in 1996 because of its importance for wildlife.

== Governance ==
An electoral ward in the same name exists. This ward stretches north-west to Bangor-on-Dee with a total population at the 2011 Census of 3,179.

The community itself is made up of three wards: Bronington, Iscoyd and Tybroughton.
