= Willington Worthenbury =

Community in Wrexham County Borough, Wales

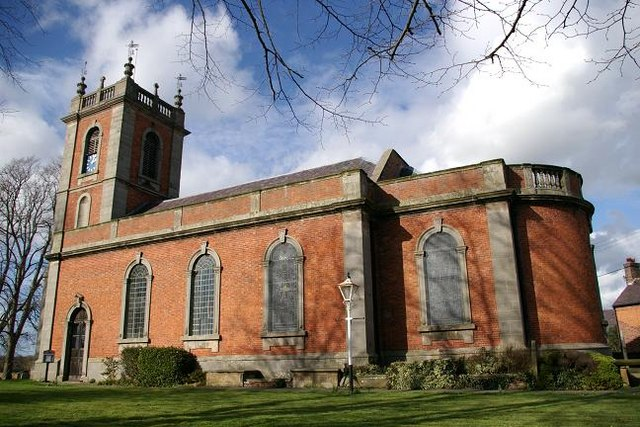
- St. Deiniol's Church, Worthenbury

- Location within Wrexham
- Population: 827 (2011)
- OS grid reference: SJ420461
- Community: Willington Worthenbury
- Principal area: Wrexham
- Country: Wales
- Sovereign state: United Kingdom
- Post town: WREXHAM
- Postcode district: LL13
- Post town: MALPAS
- Postcode district: SY14
- Dialling code: 01948
- Police: North Wales
- Fire: North Wales
- Ambulance: Welsh
- UK Parliament: Wrexham
- Senedd Cymru – Welsh Parliament: Clwyd South
- List of places UK Wales Wrexham 53.009°N 2.864°W Map of the community

Willington Worthenbury is a community in Wrexham County Borough, Wales, and is situated near the England–Wales border. Willington Wrddymbre is the former Welsh name for the area.

It has an area of 2,146 hectares and a population of 730 (2001 census), increasing to 827 at the 2011 census. It contains the villages of Worthenbury and Tallarn Green.

It is located on the eastern side of the River Dee in the English Maelor area which is within the boundaries of the historic county of Flintshire. It has the lowest proportion of Welsh language speakers of all the communities in Wrexham county borough, with 88.81% having no knowledge of Welsh according to the 2001 census.

Willington and Worthenbury were originally separate civil parishes in the detached part of Flintshire. They became part of Wrexham Maelor in 1974, and were merged sometime between 1985 and 1989. Willington may have been absorbed by Worthenbury in 1985, before the renaming in 1989.

== Worthenbury ==
Settlement at Worthenbury may have begun as early as the tenth century. The name Worthenbury may stem from the Saxon name for a stronghold 'burgh', indicating that a fortification may have been situated there. In 1086, when the Domesday Book was compiled, Worthenbury was listed as a relatively small settlement and it was within the hundred of Duddeston and the county of Cheshire.

There has been a parish church in the village since at least 1388. The current building, St Deiniol's, was built in 1739 but an earlier had been dedicated to Saint Deiniol. The church has many Georgian features and while no longer in the Church in Wales, is open to visitors. South of the village lay Emral Hall, home to the influential Puleston family until 1936 when it was demolished.

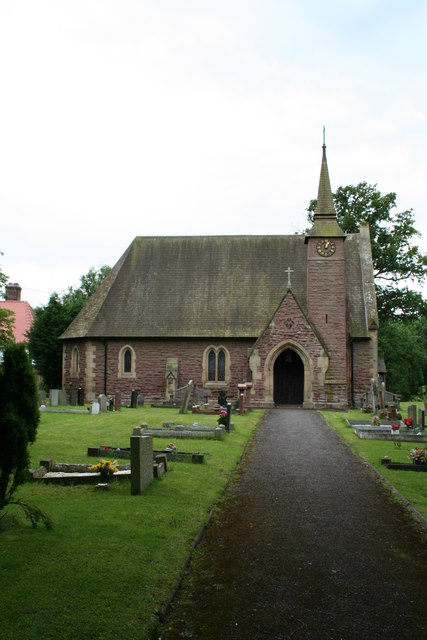
St Mary Magdalene's, Tallarn Green (Welsh: Talwrn Green), where R. S. Thomas was curate.

== Tallarn Green ==
Tallarn Green also has a small church, completed in 1873 and dedicated to Mary Magdalene. The famous poet R. S. Thomas was curate here in 1940-1942. The churchyard contains the war grave of a Manchester Regiment soldier of World War I.

The word "green" in the name of the village indicates an area of grassy common land.
