= Bangor-on-Dee =

Village in Wales

Bangor-on-Dee: Welsh: Bangor-is-y-coed or Bangor Is-coed
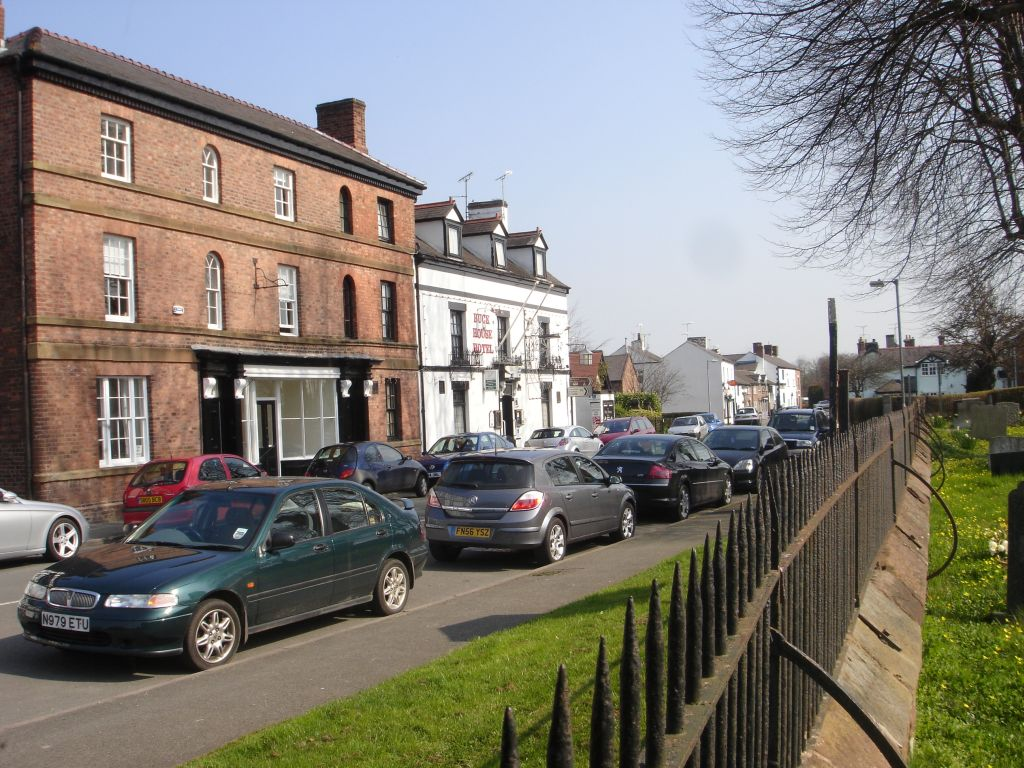
- The high street in Bangor-on-Dee

- Location within Wrexham
- Population: 1,110 (2011 Census)
- OS grid reference: SJ388454
- Community: Bangor is-y-Coed
- Principal area: Wrexham
- Preserved county: Clwyd
- Country: Wales
- Sovereign state: United Kingdom
- Post town: WREXHAM
- Postcode district: LL13
- Dialling code: 01978
- Police: North Wales
- Fire: North Wales
- Ambulance: Welsh
- UK Parliament: Clwyd South
- Senedd Cymru – Welsh Parliament: Clwyd South
- List of places UK Wales Wrexham 53.003°N 2.911°W Map of the community

Bangor-on-Dee (Welsh: Bangor-is-y-coed or standardised Bangor Is-coed) is a village and community in Wrexham County Borough, Wales, on the banks of the River Dee. Until 1974 it was in the exclave of Flintshire known as the Maelor Saesneg, and from 1974 to 1996 in the county of Clwyd.

The community had a population of 1,110 at the 2011 Census.

== Etymology ==
The anglicised name refers to the village's proximity to the River Dee. However, the older Welsh name, Bangor-is-y-Coed (or Bangor Is-Coed) literally means "Bangor" (a settlement with a wattle enclosure) "below the wood/trees". This form was first recorded in 1699, while an alternative name of the parish, "Bangor Monachorum" ("Bangor of the monks"), was first recorded in 1677.

== History ==
A monastery was established at Bangor in about AD 560 by Saint Dunod (or Dunawd) and was an important religious centre in the 5th and 6th centuries. The monastery was destroyed in about 613 by the Anglo-Saxon king Æthelfrith of Northumbria after he defeated the Welsh armies at the Battle of Chester, which probably took place near Bangor-on-Dee; a number of the monks then transferred to Bardsey Island and appear among lists of saints. Before the battle, monks from the monastery had fasted for three days and then climbed a hill to witness the fight and pray for the success of the Welsh; they were massacred on the orders of Æthelfrith. The scholar Bede wrote that 1200 monks were slaughtered and only 50 escaped. Other accounts are very different in terms of the numbers killed and the date: the Anglo-Saxon Chronicle, for example, states that 200 priests were slain at Chester in 607. More than a millennium later, the massacre was recounted in a poem entitled "The Monks of Bangor's March" by Walter Scott, and put to music by Ludwig van Beethoven. Today no trace of the monastery remains and even its site is uncertain; it is possible that all the buildings, including the church, were built of wattle and daub.

The settlement at Bangor is likely to have continued after the destruction of the monastery, although it was not mentioned in the Domesday Book, and it was an important site for pilgrims. A village was certainly in existence by 1300, when the present church of Saint Dunawd is believed to have been built. By the late 1690s, the historian Edward Lhuyd recorded that the village still had only 26 houses, but by the end of the 19th century it had significantly expanded, including a free school, a coaching inn, a shop, further houses and a brewery.

The Bangor-on-Dee Bridge, a five-arched stone arch bridge across the River Dee, dates its reconstruction to 1658 and it is believed to have been reconstructed to the designs of Inigo Jones and replaced an older medieval bridge. A 1903 suspension bridge by David Rowell & Co. is nearby at Pickhill Meadows.

== Transport ==
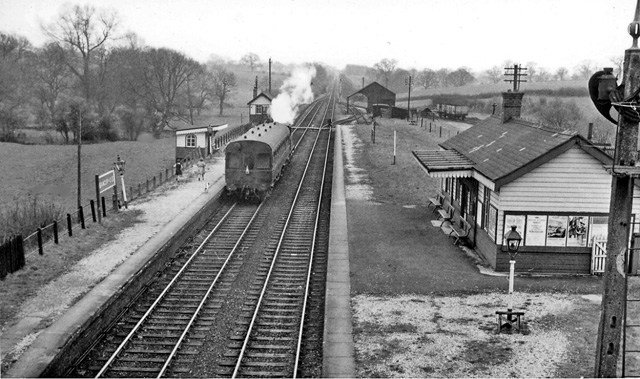
The former railway station as it was in 1962

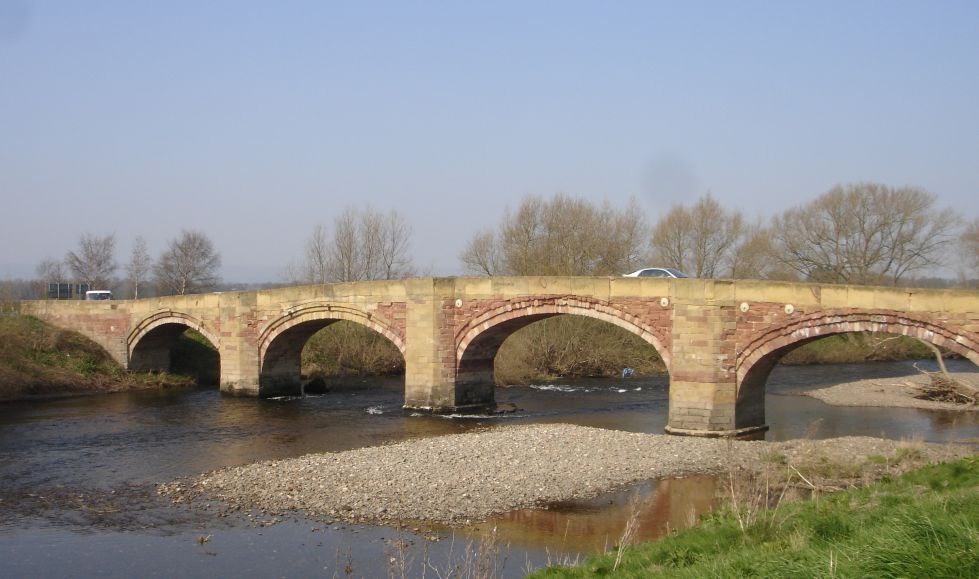
Five-arched stone bridge spans the River Dee

Bangor had a station on the Cambrian Railways' Wrexham to Ellesmere line which crossed the River Dee via an iron bridge to the north of the village. This line was opened in 1895 and ran through an entirely rural area. The line closed for passenger services in 1962.

== Recreation ==
South-west of the village there is Bangor-on-Dee racecourse, a National Hunt racecourse. There are also two pubs, a basketball court and river activities such as fishing and rafting.

== See also ==
- St Dunawd's Church, Bangor Is-coed
