= Listed buildings in Wales =

Wales within the United Kingdom

This is a list of listed buildings in Wales, which are among the listed buildings of the United Kingdom.

== Key ==
Grade	Criteria
I	Buildings of exceptional, usually national, interest.
II*	Particularly important buildings of more than special interest.
II	Buildings of special interest which warrant every effort being made to preserve them.

The organisation of the lists is on the same basis as the statutory register. County names are those used in the register, which in the case of Wales means they are broadly based on the ceremonial counties and do not always match the current administrative areas.

== Grade I listed buildings ==
County	Number of Sites
Grade I listed buildings in Anglesey	38
Grade I listed buildings in Bridgend County Borough	8
Grade I listed buildings in Caerphilly County Borough	2
Grade I listed buildings in Cardiff	16
Grade I listed buildings in Carmarthenshire	23
Grade I listed buildings in Ceredigion	10
Grade I listed buildings in Conwy County Borough	28
Grade I listed buildings in Denbighshire	28
Grade I listed buildings in Flintshire	27
Grade I listed buildings in Gwynedd	45
Grade I listed buildings in Merthyr Tydfil County Borough	2
Grade I listed buildings in Monmouthshire	53
Grade I listed buildings in Neath Port Talbot	7
Grade I listed buildings in Newport	7
Grade I listed buildings in Pembrokeshire	55
Grade I listed buildings in Powys	73
Grade I listed buildings in Rhondda Cynon Taf	3
Grade I listed buildings in Swansea	8
Grade I listed buildings in Torfaen	3
Grade I listed buildings in the Vale of Glamorgan	33
Grade I listed buildings in Wrexham County Borough	17
TOTAL: Grade I listed buildings in Wales	488

== Grade II* listed buildings ==
County	Number of Sites
Grade II* listed buildings in Anglesey	100
Grade II* listed buildings in Blaenau Gwent	10
Grade II* listed buildings in Bridgend County Borough	37
Grade II* listed buildings in Caerphilly County Borough	32
Grade II* listed buildings in Cardiff	42
Grade II* listed buildings in Carmarthenshire	119
Grade II* listed buildings in Ceredigion	106
Grade II* listed buildings in Conwy County Borough	97
Grade II* listed buildings in Denbighshire	163
Grade II* listed buildings in Flintshire	78
Grade II* listed buildings in Gwynedd	224
Grade II* listed buildings in Merthyr Tydfil County Borough	11
Grade II* listed buildings in Monmouthshire	244
Grade II* listed buildings in Neath Port Talbot	36
Grade II* listed buildings in Newport	23
Grade II* listed buildings in Pembrokeshire	186
Grade II* listed buildings in Powys	347
Grade II* listed buildings in Rhondda Cynon Taf	35
Grade II* listed buildings in Swansea	42
Grade II* listed buildings in Torfaen	23
Grade II* listed buildings in the Vale of Glamorgan	72
Grade II* listed buildings in Wrexham County Borough	78
TOTAL: Grade II* listed buildings in Wales	2,104

== Grade II listed buildings ==
County
Grade II listed buildings in Anglesey
Grade II listed buildings in Blaenau Gwent
Grade II listed buildings in Bridgend County Borough
Grade II listed buildings in Caerphilly County Borough
Grade II listed buildings in Cardiff
Grade II listed buildings in Carmarthenshire
Grade II listed buildings in Ceredigion
Grade II listed buildings in Conwy County Borough
Grade II listed buildings in Denbighshire
Grade II listed buildings in Flintshire
Grade II listed buildings in Gwynedd
Grade II listed buildings in Merthyr Tydfil County Borough
Grade II listed buildings in Monmouthshire
Grade II listed buildings in Neath Port Talbot
Grade II listed buildings in Newport
Grade II listed buildings in Pembrokeshire
Grade II listed buildings in Powys
Grade II listed buildings in Rhondda Cynon Taf
Grade II listed buildings in Swansea
Grade II listed buildings in Torfaen
Grade II listed buildings in the Vale of Glamorgan
Grade II listed buildings in Wrexham County Borough
Grade II listed buildings in Wales

== Listed buildings in Wales by principal area ==
=== Blaenau Gwent ===
- Listed buildings in Abertillery
- Listed buildings in Badminton, Blaenau Gwent
- Listed buildings in Beaufort, Blaenau Gwent
- Listed buildings in Blaina
- Listed buildings in Brynmawr
- Listed buildings in Cwm, Blaenau Gwent
- Listed buildings in Cwmtillery
- Listed buildings in Ebbw Vale North
- Listed buildings in Ebbw Vale South
- Listed buildings in Georgetown, Blaenau Gwent
- Listed buildings in Llanhilleth
- Listed buildings in Nantyglo
- Listed buildings in Rassau
- Listed buildings in Sirhowy
- Listed buildings in Six Bells
- Listed buildings in Tredegar Central and West

=== Bridgend ===
- Listed buildings in Brackla
- Listed buildings in Bridgend (Town)
- Listed buildings in Cefn Cribwr
- Listed buildings in Coity Higher
- Listed buildings in Cornelly
- Listed buildings in Coychurch Higher
- Listed buildings in Coychurch Lower
- Listed buildings in Garw Valley
- Listed buildings in Laleston
- Listed buildings in Llangynwyd Lower
- Listed buildings in Llangynwyd Middle
- Listed buildings in Maesteg (Town)
- Listed buildings in Merthyr Mawr
- Listed buildings in Newcastle Higher
- Listed buildings in Ogmore Valley
- Listed buildings in Pencoed (Town)
- Listed buildings in Porthcawl (Town)
- Listed buildings in Pyle
- Listed buildings in St Bride's Minor
- Listed buildings in Ynysawdre

=== Caerphilly ===
- Listed buildings in Aberbargoed
- Listed buildings in Abercarn
- Listed buildings in Aber Valley
- Listed buildings in Argoed, Caerphilly
- Listed buildings in Bargoed
- Listed buildings in Bedwas, Trethomas and Machen
- Listed buildings in Blackwood, Caerphilly
- Listed buildings in Cefn Fforest
- Listed buildings in Crosskeys
- Listed buildings in Crumlin, Caerphilly
- Listed buildings in Darran Valley
- Listed buildings in Gilfach
- Listed buildings in Hengoed
- Listed buildings in Llanbradach
- Listed buildings in Maesycwmmer
- Listed buildings in Morgan Jones
- Listed buildings in Moriah, Caerphilly
- Listed buildings in Nelson, Caerphilly
- Listed buildings in Newbridge, Caerphilly
- Listed buildings in New Tredegar
- Listed buildings in Pengam
- Listed buildings in Penmain
- Listed buildings in Penyrheol, Caerphilly
- Listed buildings in Pontllanfraith
- Listed buildings in Pontlottyn
- Listed buildings in Risca East
- Listed buildings in Risca West
- Listed buildings in St. Cattwg
- Listed buildings in St. James, Caerphilly
- Listed buildings in St. Martins, Caerphilly
- Listed buildings in Twyn Carno
- Listed buildings in Ynysddu
- Listed buildings in Ystrad Mynach

=== Wrexham ===
- Listed buildings in Abenbury
- Listed buildings in Acton, Wrexham
- Listed buildings in Bangor-on-Dee
- Listed buildings in Bronington
- Listed buildings in Broughton, Wrexham
- Listed buildings in Brymbo
- Listed buildings in Caia Park
- Listed buildings in Cefn, Wrexham
- Listed buildings in Ceiriog Ucha
- Listed buildings in Chirk
- Listed buildings in Coedpoeth
- Listed buildings in Erbistock
- Listed buildings in Esclusham
- Listed buildings in Glyntraian
- Listed buildings in Gresford
- Listed buildings in Gwersyllt
- Listed buildings in Hanmer, Wrexham
- Listed buildings in Holt, Wrexham
- Listed buildings in Isycoed
- Listed buildings in Llangollen Rural
- Listed buildings in Llansantffraid Glyn Ceiriog
- Listed buildings in Llay
- Listed buildings in Maelor South
- Listed buildings in Marchwiel
- Listed buildings in Minera
- Listed buildings in Offa, Wrexham
- Listed buildings in Overton-on-Dee
- Listed buildings in Pen-y-cae, Wrexham
- Listed buildings in Rhosddu
- Listed buildings in Rhosllanerchrugog
- Listed buildings in Rossett
- Listed buildings in Ruabon
- Listed buildings in Sesswick
- Listed buildings in Willington Worthenbury

==== Wrexham Grade II ====
- Grade II listed buildings in Abenbury
- Grade II listed buildings in Acton, Wrexham
- Grade II listed buildings in Bangor-on-Dee
- Grade II listed buildings in Bronington
- Grade II listed buildings in Broughton, Wrexham
- Grade II listed buildings in Brymbo
- Grade II listed buildings in Caia Park
- Grade II listed buildings in Cefn, Wrexham
- Grade II listed buildings in Ceiriog Ucha
- Grade II listed buildings in Chirk
- Grade II listed buildings in Coedpoeth
- Grade II listed buildings in Erbistock
- Grade II listed buildings in Esclusham
- Grade II listed buildings in Glyntraian
- Grade II listed buildings in Gresford
- Grade II listed buildings in Gwersyllt
- Grade II listed buildings in Hanmer, Wrexham
- Grade II listed buildings in Holt, Wrexham
- Grade II listed buildings in Isycoed
- Grade II listed buildings in Llangollen Rural
- Grade II listed buildings in Llansantffraid Glyn Ceiriog
- Grade II listed buildings in Llay
- Grade II listed buildings in Maelor South
- Grade II listed buildings in Marchwiel
- Grade II listed buildings in Minera
- Grade II listed buildings in Offa, Wrexham
- Grade II listed buildings in Overton-on-Dee
- Grade II listed buildings in Pen-y-cae, Wrexham
- Grade II listed buildings in Rhosddu
- Grade II listed buildings in Rhosllanerchrugog
- Grade II listed buildings in Rossett
- Grade II listed buildings in Ruabon
- Grade II listed buildings in Sesswick
- Grade II listed buildings in Willington Worthenbury

== See also ==
- Cadw
- List of castles in Wales
- List of monastic houses in Wales
- Lists of scheduled monuments in Wales
- Royal Commission on the Ancient and Historical Monuments of Wales
- Listed buildings in Cardiff
- Listed buildings in the Vale of Glamorgan
- Listed buildings in England
- Listed buildings in Scotland
- Listed buildings in Northern Ireland
