= Grade II listed buildings in Ruabon =

Map of the community in Wrexham County Borough.

In the United Kingdom, the term listed building refers to a building or other structure officially designated as being of special architectural, historical, or cultural significance; Grade II structures are those considered to be "buildings of special interest which justify every effort being made to preserve them". Listing was begun by a provision in the Town and Country Planning Act 1947. Once listed, strict limitations are imposed on the modifications allowed to a building's structure or fittings. In Wales, the authority for listing under the Planning (Listed Buildings and Conservation Areas) Act 1990 rests with Cadw.

This is a list of the 72 Grade II listed buildings in the community of Ruabon, in Wrexham County Borough.

Name	Location Grid Ref. (Note: Sometimes known as OSGB36, the grid reference is based on the British national grid reference system used by the Ordnance Survey.) Geo-coordinates	Date Listed	Type/Function	Notes	Reference Number	Image
10 Park Street	Ruabon; SJ3038743740; 52.986456°N 3.0384001°W	22 February 1995	Domestic		15705	–
12 Park Street	Ruabon; SJ3039043737; 52.986429°N 3.0383547°W	22 February 1995	Domestic		15707	–
14 Park Street	Ruabon; SJ3036743714; 52.986219°N 3.0386923°W	22 February 1995	Domestic		15710	–
15 Park Street	Ruabon; SJ3036543719; 52.986264°N 3.0387232°W	22 February 1995	Domestic		15711	–
16 Park Street	Ruabon; SJ3036143724; 52.986308°N 3.0387838°W	22 February 1995	Domestic		15712	–
17 Park Street	Ruabon; SJ3035843727; 52.986335°N 3.0388292°W	22 February 1995	Domestic		15713	–
18 Park Street	Ruabon; SJ3035243723; 52.986298°N 3.0389177°W	22 February 1995	Commercial		15714	–
19 Park Street	Ruabon; SJ3035343732; 52.986379°N 3.0389047°W	22 February 1995	Domestic		15715	–
2 Park Street	Ruabon; SJ3036543766; 52.986686°N 3.0387333°W	22 February 1995	Domestic		15697	–
20 Park Street	Ruabon; SJ3034943728; 52.986343°N 3.0389634°W	22 February 1995	Domestic		15716	–
21 Park Street	Ruabon; SJ3034943737; 52.986424°N 3.0389654°W	22 February 1995	Domestic		15717	–
22 Park Street	Ruabon; SJ3034643740; 52.98645°N 3.0390107°W	22 February 1995	Domestic		15718	–
23 Park Street	Ruabon; SJ3034143741; 52.986459°N 3.0390854°W	22 February 1995	Domestic		15719	–
3 Park Street	Ruabon; SJ3036843762; 52.986651°N 3.0386878°W	22 February 1995	Domestic		15698	–
4 Park Street	Ruabon; SJ3037243758; 52.986615°N 3.0386273°W	22 February 1995	Domestic		15699	–
6 Park Street	Ruabon; SJ3037643754; 52.98658°N 3.0385669°W	22 February 1995	Domestic		15701	–
7 Park Street	Ruabon; SJ3038143749; 52.986536°N 3.0384914°W	22 February 1995	Commercial		15702	–
9 Park Street	Ruabon; SJ3038443744; 52.986491°N 3.0384456°W	22 February 1995	Domestic		15704	–
All Saints' Church	Ruabon; SJ3308541890; 52.970172°N 2.9978343°W	22 February 1995	Domestic		15724	–
Almhouse	Ruabon; SJ3018043901; 52.987876°N 3.0415178°W	07 June 1963	Domestic		15688	–
Almhouse	Ruabon; SJ3016643918; 52.988027°N 3.04173°W	07 June 1963	Health and Welfare		15691	–
Almhouses	Ruabon; SJ3018543895; 52.987822°N 3.041442°W	07 June 1963	Health and Welfare		1624	–
Almshouse	Ruabon; SJ3017543907; 52.987929°N 3.0415935°W	07 June 1963	Health and Welfare		15689	–
Almshouse	Ruabon; SJ3017243913; 52.987982°N 3.0416395°W	07 June 1963	Health and Welfare		15690	–
Attached Former Kitchen Garden Walls at Wynnstay Hall	Ruabon; SJ3100442703; 52.977215°N 3.0289893°W	22 February 1995	Domestic		15741	–
Belan Place	Ruabon; SJ3101741992; 52.970827°N 3.028644°W	22 February 1995	Domestic		15732	–
Boat House	Ruabon; SJ3086443116; 52.980909°N 3.0311624°W	22 February 1995	Religious, Ritual and Funerary		15745	–
Broth Lodge (East) including attached screen wall and gatepiers	Ruabon; SJ3116643347; 52.983024°N 3.0267144°W	22 February 1995	Transport		15752	–
Broth Lodge (West) including attached screen wall and gatepiers	Ruabon; SJ3113643353; 52.983074°N 3.0271624°W	22 February 1995	Transport		15751	–
Bryn House	Ruabon; SJ3280842800; 52.978317°N 3.0021475°W	07 June 1963	Domestic		1633	–
Chapel at Wynnstay Hall	Ruabon; SJ3098742650; 52.976737°N 3.0292311°W	22 February 1995	Religious, Ritual and Funerary		15739	–
Coach House at Belan Place	Ruabon; SJ3105941990; 52.970814°N 3.0280182°W	22 February 1995	Religious, Ritual and Funerary		15734	–
Congregational Church (including attached Sunday School, gatepiers, walls and railings)	Ruabon; SJ3008643942; 52.988232°N 3.0429267°W	22 February 1995	Religious, Ritual and Funerary		15721	–
Crab Mill	Ruabon; SJ3271842347; 52.974234°N 3.0033933°W	31 December 2004	Religious, Ritual and Funerary		83277	–
Estate Cottage at Wynnstay Hall	Ruabon; SJ3101542696; 52.977154°N 3.028824°W	22 February 1995	Gardens, Parks and Urban Spaces		15740	–
Former Estate Office at Wynnstay Hall	Ruabon; SJ3095942697; 52.977155°N 3.0296581°W	22 February 1995	Commercial		15738	–
Former School House to Old Grammar School	Ruabon; SJ3024443817; 52.987129°N 3.0405464°W	14 May 1988	Agriculture and Subsistence		1724	–
Front Lodge	Ruabon; SJ3332041757; 52.969006°N 2.9943082°W	22 February 1995	Religious, Ritual and Funerary		15725	–
Game Larder at Wynnstay Hall	Ruabon; SJ3095942662; 52.976841°N 3.0296506°W	22 February 1995	Civil		15737	–
Gate Piers and Gates beside Front Lodge	Ruabon; SJ3333941758; 52.969018°N 2.9940256°W	22 February 1995	Industrial		15726	–
Gates and Gate piers at Bakers Lodge	Ruabon; SJ3157242961; 52.979607°N 3.0205864°W	22 February 1995	Education		15754	–
Gateway and attached Walls to NW of Pen-Y-Lan Hall	Ruabon; SJ3289241102; 52.963066°N 3.0005441°W	22 February 1995	Domestic		15728	–
Ha-Ha Walls to E of Kitchen Garden at Wynnstay Hall	Ruabon; SJ3120842644; 52.976711°N 3.0259392°W	22 February 1995	Domestic		15744	–
Hearse Shed	Ruabon; SJ3026143826; 52.987212°N 3.0402952°W	14 May 1988	Commercial		15686	–
House attached to School Room	Ruabon; SJ3135442518; 52.975597°N 3.0237385°W	22 February 1995	Domestic		15757	–
Ice House	Ruabon; SJ3047543045; 52.980221°N 3.0369398°W	22 February 1995	Domestic		15747	–
L-Shaped Stables at Pen-Y-Lan Hall	Ruabon; SJ3289341133; 52.963344°N 3.0005356°W	22 February 1995			15729	–
Mary's Salon	Ruabon; SJ3031943810; 52.987076°N 3.0394279°W	22 February 1995	Transport		15693	–
Moreton below Farmhouse (also known as Lower Moreton Farm)	Ruabon; SJ3211344755; 52.9958°N 3.0129076°W	22 February 1995	Domestic		15722	–
Oaklands (including attached forecourt walls and gatepiers)	Ruabon; SJ3036943987; 52.988673°N 3.0387214°W	22 February 1995	Domestic		15694	–
Oaklands (including attached forecourt walls and gatepiers)	Ruabon; SJ3036543989; 52.988691°N 3.0387814°W	22 February 1995	Commercial		15695	–
Park Eyton Lodge (also known as Kennels Lodge)	Ruabon; SJ3272543184; 52.981757°N 3.0034634°W	22 February 1995	Commercial		15753	–
Pen-Y-Lan Hall	Ruabon; SJ3290741081; 52.962879°N 3.0003164°W	22 February 1995	Commercial		15727	–
Plunge Pool	Ruabon; SJ3053443421; 52.983608°N 3.0361421°W	07 June 1963	Domestic		15750	–
Round House	Ruabon; SJ3025343766; 52.986672°N 3.0404014°W	07 June 1963	Domestic		1623	–
Ruabon Gates (also known as Wynnstay Gates and Archway)	Ruabon; SJ3038843711; 52.986195°N 3.0383789°W	09 June 1952	Industrial		1550	–
Ruabon Railway Station	Ruabon; SJ3006143820; 52.987132°N 3.0432726°W	24 February 1983	Domestic		1719	–
School Lodge (including attached Colonnade)	Ruabon; SJ3137442539; 52.975789°N 3.0234451°W	22 February 1995	Gardens, Parks and Urban Spaces		15755	–
School Room	Ruabon; SJ3135942525; 52.975661°N 3.0236655°W	22 February 1995	Transport		15756	–
Sluice Outlet	Ruabon; SJ3041843111; 52.980806°N 3.0378028°W	22 February 1995	Transport		15748	–
Spring Lodge (including Forecourt Walls and Railings)	Ruabon; SJ3025643851; 52.987436°N 3.040375°W	22 February 1995	Domestic		15692	–
Stable block at Wynnstay Hall	Ruabon; SJ3092142641; 52.976647°N 3.030212°W	09 June 1952	Transport		15736	–
Stables	Ruabon; SJ3106042007; 52.970967°N 3.028007°W	22 February 1995			15733	–
Stonehurst	Ruabon; SJ3023343836; 52.987298°N 3.0407144°W	22 February 1995	Commemorative		15687	–
Sundial on the Churchyard to Church of St Mary	Ruabon; SJ3028043774; 52.986747°N 3.040001°W	22 February 1995	Gardens, Parks and Urban Spaces		15685	–
Terrier Kennels at Belan Place	Ruabon; SJ3105941990; 52.970814°N 3.0280182°W	22 February 1995			15735	–
The Gate House (also known as Park / Gate Lodge)	Ruabon; SJ3037443708; 52.986166°N 3.0385868°W	22 February 1995	Domestic		15708	–
The Old Grammar School	Ruabon; SJ3025043826; 52.987211°N 3.040459°W	14 May 1988	Domestic		1723	–
Tunnel to E of Kitchen Garden at Wynnstay Hall	Ruabon; SJ3119942641; 52.976683°N 3.0260726°W	22 February 1995	Domestic		15743	–
Walker Fan House at the former Wynnstay Colliery	Ruabon; SJ2933443327; 52.982606°N 3.0539922°W	22 February 1995	Domestic		15730	–
Wyfydd	Ruabon; SJ3371841614; 52.96777°N 2.9883537°W	05 May 1993	Domestic		1745	–
Wynnstay Arms PH	Ruabon; SJ3033843785; 52.986854°N 3.0391395°W	07 June 1963	Commercial		1625	–

== See also ==
- Grade II listed buildings in Wrexham County Borough
