= Grade I listed buildings in Wrexham County Borough =

Wrexham County Borough shown within Wales

In the United Kingdom, the term listed building refers to a building or other structure officially designated as being of special architectural, historical, or cultural significance; Grade I structures are those considered to be "buildings of exceptional interest". Listing was begun by a provision in the Town and Country Planning Act 1947. Once listed, strict limitations are imposed on the modifications allowed to a building's structure or fittings. In Wales, the authority for listing under the Planning (Listed Buildings and Conservation Areas) Act 1990 rests with Cadw.

== Buildings ==
Name	Location Grid Ref. (Note: Sometimes known as OSGB36, the grid reference is based on the British national grid reference system used by the Ordnance Survey.) Geo-coordinates	Date Listed	Function	Notes	Reference Number	Image
Chirk Castle	Chirk; SJ2684838099; 52°56′07″N 3°05′23″W	20 October 1952	Castle	The castle stands on a bluff overlooking and controlling the Ceiliog Valley. It is reached by Station Avenue running directly W from Chirk township.	598	See more images
Church of St Mary, Chirk	Chirk; SJ2914137636; 52°55′53″N 3°03′20″W	4 January 1966	Church	The parish church stands at the S end of the main street of Chirk, within its own graveyard, on the N edge of the valley of the Afon Ceiriog.	615	See more images
Chirk Castle Gates, Screen and Piers	Chirk; SJ2810437681; 52°55′54″N 3°04′16″W	4 January 1966	Gates	The screen stands on the skyline at the Llwyn-y-Cil entrance to Chirk Castle Park at the end of Station Avenue, and set back from the right-angled bend.	1315	See more images
Erddig	Marchwiel; SJ3259248249; 53°01′38″N 3°00′23″W	9 June 1952	House	Situated c.3km W of Marchwiel, reached from a series of by-roads running E from the A483. Set within an extremely fine landscaped park of C17 and C18 character.	1533	See more images
All Saints' Church, Gresford	Gresford; SJ3464754980; 53°05′17″N 2°58′38″W	7 June 1963	Church	Set in rectangular churchyard at the centre of the village.	1591	See more images
St Chad's Church, Holt	Holt; SJ4120854104; 53°04′51″N 2°52′45″W	7 June 1963	Church	Set within a rectangular churchyard, at the end of a lane, and retaining good C19 monuments.	1596	See more images
Pontcysyllte Aqueduct	Llangollen Rural; SJ2704241984; 52°58′13″N 3°05′16″W	7 June 1963	Aqueduct	Located over the River Dee between Trevor and Froncysyllte.	1601	See more images
Pont Cysylltau	Llangollen Rural; SJ2680842043; 52°58′15″N 3°05′29″W	7 June 1963	Bridge	Situated near a looping bend in River Dee between Trevor and Froncysyllte.	1602	See more images
Church of St Mary, including churchyard walls and lychgate	Ruabon; SJ3027643801; 52°59′13″N 3°02′24″W	7 June 1963	Church	Situated in the church yard which is between Bridge Street and Church Street.	1622	See more images
Bangor Bridge (partly in Bangor-is-y-Coed Community)	Sesswick; SJ3881045454; 53°00′10″N 2°54′48″W	16 November 1962	Bridge	The corresponding number for the part of the bridge in the Bangor-is-y-Coed community is 1645.	1635	See more images
Halghton Hall	Halghton, Hanmer; SJ4156642431; 52°58′34″N 2°52′18″W	17 March 1953	Country House	Reached by a minor road and farm road on the S side of the A525, 4km SE of Bangor-is-y-coed.	1641	See more images
Bangor Bridge	Bangor is y Coed; SJ3878545440; 53°00′10″N 2°54′49″W	16 November 1962	Bridge	Situated at the end of the High Street crossing the River Dee.	1645	See more images
Parish Church of St Deiniol	Willington Worthenbury; SJ4189346228; 53°00′37″N 2°52′03″W	16 November 1962	Parish Church	Located to the west of the centre of the village, a short distance along Church Road, within a walled graveyard. Fine views of the church across open meadows on the approach to the village from the south on the B5069.	1705	See more images
Holt Bridge	Holt; SJ4115854391; 53°05′01″N 2°52′48″W	7 June 1963	Bridge	Spanning the broad River Dee which forms the boundary between Wales and England. Carries the main road, formerly the A 534, between Holt and Farndon.	1742	See more images
St Giles' Church, Wrexham	Offa; SJ3355350121; 53°02′39″N 2°59′33″W	30 May 1951	Church	In enclosed churchyard, standing at southern boundary of city centre to rear of High Street, prominently sited above and valley of the River Gwenfro.	1769	See more images
Newbridge Lodge	Cefn; SJ2871941834; 52°58′09″N 3°03′46″W	30 April 1996	Lodge	South-western entrance to Wynnstay Park, on the west bank of the Dee immediately northwest of New Bridge over the river.	16872	See more images
Entrance Gates and Railings at Newbridge Lodge	Cefn; SJ2872341824; 52°58′09″N 3°03′46″W	30 April 1996	Gates	South-western entrance to Wynnstay Park, on the west bank of the Dee immediately northwest of New Bridge over the river.	16873	See more images

== See also ==
- Grade II* listed buildings in Wrexham County Borough
- Listed buildings in Wales
