= Wrexham Rural District =

Former Welsh rural district

Wrexham was a rural district in the administrative county of Denbighshire from 1894 and 1974.

The rural district took over the existing Wrexham Rural Sanitary District. It consisted of the following civil parishes:

- Abenbury
- Acton†
- Allington
- Bersham
- Bieston
- Borras Hwfa†
- Borras Riffri†
- Broughton
- Brymbo
- Burton
- Cefn: created 1895, from part of Ruabon
- Dutton Cacca
- Dutton Diffeith
- Dutton y Brain
- Erbistock
- Erddig
- Erlas
- Esclusham Above
- Esclusham Below
- Eyton†
- Gourton†
- Gresford
- Gwersyllt
- Holt
- Llay
- Marchwiel
- Minera
- Pen y Cae: created 1895 from part of Ruabon
- Pickhill†
- Ruabon
- Rhosllannerchrugog: created 1895 from part of Ruabon
- Ridley
- Royton†
- Sesswick†
- Stansty†
- Sutton

The parishes marked † were abolished by a County Review Order in 1935, and their areas redistributed to other parishes in the rural district and to the borough of Wrexham. At the same time the district was enlarged by the addition of two parishes from the abolished Llangollen Rural District: Llangollen Rural and Llantysilio.

The rural district was abolished by the Local Government Act 1972 in 1974. Most of the area passed to Wrexham Maelor, with Llangollen Rural and Llantysilio parishes passing to Glyndŵr, both districts in the new county of Clwyd.
