= Grade II listed buildings in Llangollen Rural =

Map of the community in Wrexham County Borough.

In the United Kingdom, the term listed building refers to a building or other structure officially designated as being of special architectural, historical, or cultural significance; Grade II structures are those considered to be "buildings of special interest which justify every effort being made to preserve them". Listing was begun by a provision in the Town and Country Planning Act 1947. Once listed, strict limitations are imposed on the modifications allowed to a building's structure or fittings. In Wales, the authority for listing under the Planning (Listed Buildings and Conservation Areas) Act 1990 rests with Cadw.

This is a list of the 17 Grade II listed buildings in the community of Llangollen Rural, in Wrexham County Borough.

Name	Location Grid Ref. (Note: Sometimes known as OSGB36, the grid reference is based on the British national grid reference system used by the Ordnance Survey.) Geo-coordinates	Date Listed	Type/Function	Notes	Reference Number	Image
Argoed Hall	Llangollen Rural; SJ2688741338; 52.964401°N 3.0899823°W	7 February 1992	Gardens, Parks and Urban Spaces		1348	–
Bridge next to Telford Inn	Llangollen Rural; SJ2717642317; 52.973239°N 3.085901°W	11 June 1998	Domestic		19966	–
Bridge No 31	Llangollen Rural; SJ2705842215; 52.972306°N 3.0876348°W	11 June 1998	Domestic		19969	–
Bryn Seion Presbyterian Chapel	Llangollen Rural; SJ2709642373; 52.973731°N 3.0871047°W	11 June 1998	Domestic		19968	–
Former Mount Zion Primitive Methodist Chapel and Graveyard	Llangollen Rural; SJ2701241211; 52.963276°N 3.0880929°W	11 June 1998	Agriculture and Subsistence		19960	–
Kilns at Wood Bank	Llangollen Rural; SJ2680342167; 52.97184°N 3.0914204°W	11 June 1998	Commercial		19971	–
Lime Kilns	Llangollen Rural; SJ2751241168; 52.962958°N 3.0806407°W	11 June 1998			19962	–
New Road (House next to Telford Inn)	Llangollen Rural; SJ2715542322; 52.973281°N 3.0862147°W	11 June 1998	Domestic		19967	–
Pair of Docks on E side of Trevor Basin, excluding modern workshop superstructure and swing bridge.	Llangollen Rural; SJ2711142207; 52.972241°N 3.0868439°W	1 October 2007	Commercial		87547	–
Stables at Argoed Hall	Llangollen Rural; SJ2689341390; 52.964869°N 3.0899047°W	7 February 1992	Domestic		1349	–
Telford Inn	Llangollen Rural; SJ2714142328; 52.973333°N 3.0864245°W	24 November 1983			1306	–
Trevor Church	Llangollen Rural; SJ2579242232; 52.972285°N 3.106487°W	7 June 1963	Gardens, Parks and Urban Spaces		1604	–
Trevor Tower	Llangollen Rural; SJ2562443381; 52.982588°N 3.1092527°W	11 June 1998	Domestic		19963	–
Trevor Tower Cottage	Llangollen Rural; SJ2560643376; 52.982541°N 3.1095196°W	11 June 1998	Institutional		19964	–
War Memorial	Llangollen Rural; SJ2735941141; 52.962694°N 3.0829121°W	11 June 1998	Domestic		19961	–
Wood Bank	Llangollen Rural; SJ2681342160; 52.971778°N 3.0912699°W	11 June 1998	Domestic		19970	–
Ysgoldy Brynhyfryd and two integrated Houses	Llangollen Rural; SJ2559442932; 52.978549°N 3.109596°W	11 June 1998	Domestic		19965	–

== See also ==
- Grade II listed buildings in Wrexham County Borough
