= Grade II listed buildings in Erbistock =

Map of the community in Wrexham County Borough.

In the United Kingdom, the term listed building refers to a building or other structure officially designated as being of special architectural, historical, or cultural significance; Grade II structures are considered "buildings of special interest which justify every effort being made to preserve them". A provision in the Town and Country Planning Act 1947 began listing. Once listed, strict limitations are imposed on modifications to a building's structure or fittings. In Wales, the authority for listing under the Planning (Listed Buildings and Conservation Areas) Act 1990 rests with Cadw.

This is a list of the 15 Grade II listed buildings in the community of Erbistock in Wrexham County Borough.

Name	Location Grid Ref. (Note: Sometimes known as OSGB36, the grid reference is based on the British national grid reference system used by the Ordnance Survey.) Geo-coordinates	Date Listed	Type/Function	Notes	Reference Number	Image
Barn at Rose Hill	Erbistock; SJ3487942852; 52.97904°N 2.9713192°W	13 February 1995	Transport		15177	–
Church of Saint Hilary	Erbistock; SJ3557541329; 52.965436°N 2.9606514°W	13 February 1995			15167	–
Coach House at Rose Hill	Erbistock; SJ3494042861; 52.979128°N 2.9704127°W	13 February 1995	Religious, Ritual and Funerary		15176	–
Ddol Farmhouse	Erbistock; SJ3659144166; 52.991056°N 2.9460837°W	7 June 1963	Domestic		1582	–
Erbistock Hall	Erbistock; SJ3509242447; 52.975426°N 2.9680661°W	7 June 1963	Domestic		15170	–
Farmbuilding to North of Erbistock Hall	Erbistock; SJ3510542525; 52.976128°N 2.9678882°W	7 June 1963	Domestic		1577	–
Mill House	Erbistock; SJ3536042041; 52.971809°N 2.9639944°W	13 February 1995	Domestic		15169	–
Old Rose Cottage	Erbistock; SJ3542342804; 52.978674°N 2.9632089°W	13 February 1995	Domestic		15172	–
Plas Pen-y-Bryn	Erbistock; SJ3445441854; 52.970018°N 2.9774454°W	7 June 1963	Domestic		1583	–
Rose Hill (including Walled Garden)	Erbistock; SJ3495042845; 52.978986°N 2.9702606°W	13 February 1995	Domestic		15175	–
Rose Lodge (also known as the Old Post Office)	Erbistock; SJ3544342887; 52.979423°N 2.9629277°W	13 February 1995	Industrial		15173	–
Telephone Call-box beside Rose Lodge	Erbistock; SJ3543842900; 52.979539°N 2.9630047°W	13 February 1995			15174	–
The Boat Inn PH	Erbistock; SJ3549941318; 52.965328°N 2.9617805°W	13 February 1995	Pub		15166	
The Old Rectory	Erbistock; SJ3564041371; 52.965821°N 2.9596921°W	13 February 1995	Domestic		15168	–
White House	Erbistock; SJ3588745283; 53.001011°N 2.9567919°W	13 February 1995	Education		15171	–

== See also ==
- Grade II listed buildings in Wrexham County Borough
