= Grade II listed buildings in Chirk =

Map of the community in Wrexham County Borough.

In the United Kingdom, the term listed building refers to a building or other structure officially designated as being of special architectural, historical, or cultural significance; Grade II structures are those considered to be "buildings of special interest which justify every effort being made to preserve them". Listing was begun by a provision in the Town and Country Planning Act 1947. Once listed, strict limitations are imposed on the modifications allowed to a building's structure or fittings. In Wales, the authority for listing under the Planning (Listed Buildings and Conservation Areas) Act 1990 rests with Cadw.

This is a list of the 90 Grade II listed buildings in the community of Chirk, in Wrexham County Borough.

Name	Location Grid Ref. (Note: Sometimes known as OSGB36, the grid reference is based on the British national grid reference system used by the Ordnance Survey.) Geo-coordinates	Date Listed	Type/Function	Notes	Reference Number	Image
1 Castle Road, Chirk, Wrexham, LL14 5BS	Chirk; SJ2908637620; 52.93128°N 3.0564342°W	29 July 1998	Domestic		20257	–
1 Hand Terrace, Chirk, Wrexham, LL14 5EU	Chirk; SJ2907137819; 52.933067°N 3.0567009°W	29 July 1998	Domestic		20216	–
2 Hand Terrace, Chirk, Wrexham, LL14 5EU	Chirk; SJ2907237824; 52.933112°N 3.0566871°W	29 July 1998	Domestic		20217	–
3 Hand Terrace, Chirk, Wrexham, LL14 5EU	Chirk; SJ2907137828; 52.933147°N 3.0567028°W	29 July 1998	Domestic		20218	–
4 Hand Terrace, Chirk, Wrexham, LL14 5EU	Chirk; SJ2907037831; 52.933174°N 3.0567184°W	29 July 1998	Domestic		20219	–
5 Hand Terrace, Chirk, Wrexham, LL14 5EU	Chirk; SJ2907237836; 52.933219°N 3.0566897°W	29 July 1998	Domestic		20220	–
6 Hand Terrace, Chirk, Wrexham, LL14 5EU	Chirk; SJ2907337841; 52.933265°N 3.0566759°W	29 July 1998	Domestic		20221	–
7 Hand Terrace, Chirk, Wrexham, LL14 5EU	Chirk; SJ2906937844; 52.933291°N 3.0567361°W	29 July 1998	Domestic		20222	–
Arbour within Brynkinallt Park	Chirk; SJ3027337733; 52.932451°N 3.0388027°W	29 July 1998	Domestic		20232	–
Barc-du, also known as Sawmill Cottage	Chirk; SJ2776339118; 52.944567°N 3.0764469°W	04 January 1966	Domestic		620	–
Bronze Statue on a plinth in the E garden	Chirk; SJ2689438014; 52.934527°N 3.0891272°W	29 July 1998	Transport		20239	–
Bryn Coed	Chirk; SJ2903937567; 52.930797°N 3.0571217°W	29 July 1998			20249	–
Bryn Eglwys	Chirk; SJ2906037611; 52.931196°N 3.0568189°W	29 July 1998	Domestic		20255	–
Chirk Furniture and Carpet Centre and Dwelling	Chirk; SJ2907037950; 52.934244°N 3.0567444°W	03 December 1973	Domestic		1290	–
Chirk Lodge, Brynkinallt Park	Chirk; SJ2938037660; 52.931678°N 3.0520699°W	29 July 1998	Transport		20206	–
Chirk Mill	Chirk; SJ2909837330; 52.928675°N 3.0561922°W	29 July 1998	Religious, Ritual and Funerary		20258	–
Chirk Surgery	Chirk; SJ2907437615; 52.931233°N 3.0566116°W	29 July 1998	Domestic		20256	–
Chirk Town Council Offices	Chirk; SJ2908037996; 52.934659°N 3.0566058°W	29 July 1998	Office		20215	–
Cottage at The Kennels	Chirk; SJ2642139175; 52.944897°N 3.0964269°W	29 July 1998	Religious, Ritual and Funerary		20264	–
Cross Street Tunnel and Archways	Chirk; SJ2786341035; 52.96181°N 3.0753864°W	01 October 2007	Religious, Ritual and Funerary		87549	–
Deer Park Wall	Chirk; SJ2754837250; 52.927749°N 3.0792279°W	29 July 1998			20273	–
Deerpark Lodge	Chirk; SJ2757937315; 52.928337°N 3.0787814°W	29 July 1998	Domestic		20272	–
Dog Kennel and Mounting Block at Halton Farm	Chirk; SJ3060639646; 52.949688°N 3.0342595°W	29 July 1998	Domestic		20235	–
Dovecote	Chirk; SJ2686438003; 52.934424°N 3.0895709°W	29 July 1998	Dovecote		20269	–
Drumore	Chirk; SJ2869439954; 52.952205°N 3.062779°W	03 December 1973			1289	–
Farm Building at Fron-uchaf Farm, with front garden wall	Chirk; SJ2721240474; 52.95668°N 3.08495°W	29 July 1998	Domestic		20262	–
Fron-uchaf Farmhouse	Chirk; SJ2719740449; 52.956453°N 3.0851677°W	29 July 1998	Farmhouse		20261	–
Gates to E Garden	Chirk; SJ2691538118; 52.935464°N 3.0888383°W	29 July 1998			20270	–
Gates, Piers and Railings to the W Gate of Brynkinallt Park	Chirk; SJ2937137653; 52.931614°N 3.0522022°W	29 July 1998	Domestic		20207	–
Gazebo	Chirk; SJ2721938138; 52.935685°N 3.0843206°W	29 July 1998	Gazebo		20244	–
Ha-ha at the E end of the E Garden	Chirk; SJ2716738050; 52.934887°N 3.0850743°W	29 July 1998			20247	–
Halton Farmhouse	Chirk; SJ3062439645; 52.949681°N 3.0339914°W	29 July 1998	Religious, Ritual and Funerary		20233	–
Halton Former Mission Church	Chirk; SJ3024839789; 52.950927°N 3.0396176°W	20 July 1994	Gardens, Parks and Urban Spaces		14557	–
Hand Hotel	Chirk; SJ2907137757; 52.932509°N 3.0566873°W	11 February 1976	Domestic		1298	–
Hawk House in the E Garden	Chirk; SJ2709638002; 52.934446°N 3.0861197°W	29 July 1998	Commercial		20243	–
Irishman's Bridge on the Llangollen Canal	Chirk; SJ2860240766; 52.959491°N 3.0643273°W	29 July 1998	Health and Welfare		20214	–
Johnston's Cottage and Farm Buildings of Home Farm	Chirk; SJ2668038285; 52.936933°N 3.0923718°W	29 July 1998	Domestic		20268	–
Lady's Bridge, Brynkinallt Park (continued into England)	Chirk; SJ3077937652; 52.931789°N 3.0312588°W	29 July 1998	Agriculture and Subsistence		20230	–
Ley Farmhouse	Chirk; SJ2987839171; 52.945324°N 3.0449896°W	11 February 1976	Domestic		1297	–
Llwyn-y-cil Cottage	Chirk; SJ2798838077; 52.935241°N 3.0728676°W	04 January 1966	Commercial		624	–
Llwyn-y-cil Lodge	Chirk; SJ2808637703; 52.931893°N 3.0713268°W	29 July 1998	Domestic		20211	–
Lowest Terrace Wall at Whitehurst Gardens	Chirk; SJ2881940008; 52.952707°N 3.0609307°W	29 July 1998	Domestic		20226	–
Lychgate outside Church of St Mary	Chirk; SJ2911937626; 52.931338°N 3.0559447°W	29 July 1998	Domestic		20203	–
Medieval Font in the E Garden	Chirk; SJ2711138051; 52.934889°N 3.0859076°W	29 July 1998	Domestic		20245	–
Milestone	Chirk; SJ2908637595; 52.931055°N 3.0564287°W	29 July 1998	Domestic		20212	–
New Hall	Chirk; SJ2749238973; 52.943227°N 3.0804465°W	04 January 1966	Domestic		621	–
New Hall Gate to Chirk Park: the N Lodge	Chirk; SJ2750638770; 52.941404°N 3.0801928°W	04 January 1966	Domestic		20227	–
New Hall Gate to Chirk Park: the S Lodge	Chirk; SJ2751538760; 52.941316°N 3.0800566°W	04 January 1966	Domestic		622	–
North Gate Piers to Chirk Town Council Offices	Chirk; SJ2904938015; 52.934825°N 3.0570711°W	29 July 1998	Domestic		20228	–
Nos 1 and 2 Home Farm Cottages	Chirk; SJ2663438322; 52.937259°N 3.0930645°W	29 July 1998	Domestic		20271	–
Nos 6 & 7 Coed-derw	Chirk; SJ2794938164; 52.936018°N 3.0734671°W	04 January 1966	Religious, Ritual and Funerary		623	–
Pen-y-bont Brick and Tile Co Office	Chirk; SJ2914441406; 52.965315°N 3.0564004°W	29 July 1998	Domestic		20213	–
Pen-y-clawdd Farmhouse	Chirk; SJ2867540778; 52.959609°N 3.0632434°W	29 July 1998	Commercial		20223	–
Plas-Offa	Chirk; SJ2817640531; 52.957322°N 3.0706156°W	29 July 1998	Domestic		20253	–
Pont-faen (continued into England)	Chirk; SJ2801837074; 52.92623°N 3.0721985°W	04 January 1966	Domestic		625	–
Pont-y-blew	Chirk; SJ3101338249; 52.937185°N 3.0279053°W	20 October 1952			601	–
Remains of Forge at Pont-y-blew	Chirk; SJ3114138408; 52.93863°N 3.0260349°W	29 July 1998	Religious, Ritual and Funerary		20260	–
Rob's Cottage, Greenfield and Arosfa	Chirk; SJ2736840256; 52.954741°N 3.0825794°W	29 July 1998			20263	–
Screen Wall and Towers defining the S Stable Yard on the S side	Chirk; SJ2683638022; 52.934591°N 3.0899917°W	29 July 1998	Domestic		20250	–
Screen Wall to the service yard at Brynkinallt Hall	Chirk; SJ3031137907; 52.93402°N 3.0382749°W	29 July 1998	Domestic		20231	–
Second Terrace Wall at Whitehurst Gardens	Chirk; SJ2872740015; 52.952758°N 3.0623013°W	29 July 1998			20225	–
Smithy at Whitehurst Gate and House attached	Chirk; SJ2837640475; 52.956845°N 3.0676266°W	04 January 1966	Transport		627	–
South Gate Piers to Chirk Town Council Offices	Chirk; SJ2904937978; 52.934493°N 3.057063°W	29 July 1998	Domestic		20229	–
Squash Court at Chirk Castle	Chirk; SJ2672538221; 52.936364°N 3.0916879°W	04 May 2010	Religious, Ritual and Funerary		87603	
St Michael's Nursing Home	Chirk; SJ2933937568; 52.930846°N 3.0526597°W	29 July 1998	Domestic		20274	–
Statue by the lily pond in the E Garden	Chirk; SJ2713937909; 52.933616°N 3.0854591°W	29 July 1998	Domestic		20242	–
Statue in the E Garden	Chirk; SJ2693838027; 52.93465°N 3.0884756°W	29 July 1998	Religious, Ritual and Funerary		20240	–
Statue in the E Garden	Chirk; SJ2693838024; 52.934623°N 3.0884749°W	29 July 1998	Domestic		20241	–
Statue of Hercules	Chirk; SJ2712838068; 52.935044°N 3.0856585°W	29 July 1998	Domestic		20237	–
Sundial in churchyard of the Church of St Mary	Chirk; SJ2913437614; 52.931232°N 3.0557189°W	29 July 1998			20204	–
Sundial in front of the Hawk House in the E Garden	Chirk; SJ2709137984; 52.934284°N 3.08619°W	29 July 1998	Transport		20246	–
Sundial in the E Garden	Chirk; SJ2689138034; 52.934706°N 3.0891763°W	29 July 1998	Domestic		20238	–
Telford Milestone (83)	Chirk; SJ2903238108; 52.935659°N 3.0573443°W	29 July 1998			20236	–
The Forge	Chirk; SJ3111838446; 52.938969°N 3.0263852°W	29 July 1998	Domestic		20252	–
The Kennels	Chirk; SJ2644439192; 52.945053°N 3.0960886°W	29 July 1998			20265	–
The Lodge	Chirk; SJ2919239564; 52.948766°N 3.0552827°W	04 January 1966			626	–
The Mount, with front garden railings and gate	Chirk; SJ2911237599; 52.931095°N 3.0560429°W	04 January 1966	Domestic		616	–
Town Reservoir	Chirk; SJ2825637646; 52.931403°N 3.0687855°W	29 July 1998			20254	–
Trevor House	Chirk; SJ2920837584; 52.930973°N 3.0546117°W	04 January 1966	Gardens, Parks and Urban Spaces		617	–
Trevor Mausoleum in churchyard of the Church of St Mary	Chirk; SJ2923837654; 52.931606°N 3.0541807°W	29 July 1998	Gardens, Parks and Urban Spaces		20208	–
Two adjoining Ranges of Farm Buildings, with a Horse Gin at Halton Farm	Chirk; SJ3061439673; 52.949932°N 3.0341462°W	29 July 1998	Communications		20234	–
Upper Terrace Wall at Whitehurst Gardens	Chirk; SJ2881140045; 52.953039°N 3.0610579°W	29 July 1998	Commercial		20224	–
Wall bounding driveway to the Stables and continuing the stable yard screen	Chirk; SJ2681038040; 52.934749°N 3.0903826°W	29 July 1998	Commercial		20266	–
Wall on the NE side of the driveway to the Stables	Chirk; SJ2680038060; 52.934927°N 3.0905358°W	29 July 1998	Commercial		20267	–
Walls to the Privy Garden	Chirk; SJ2696738038; 52.934752°N 3.0880467°W	29 July 1998	Domestic		20251	–
Ward Monument in churchyard of the Church of St Mary	Chirk; SJ2914037620; 52.931287°N 3.055631°W	29 July 1998	Domestic		20205	–
Whitehouse Bridge	Chirk; SJ2858340456; 52.956702°N 3.0645416°W	01 October 2007	Domestic		87548	–
Whitehurst Garden Gatepiers with Gates and perimeter Garden Wall	Chirk; SJ2889239897; 52.951719°N 3.0598199°W	03 December 1973	Domestic		1286	–
Whitehurst House	Chirk; SJ2871040060; 52.95316°N 3.0625642°W	03 December 1973	Domestic		1287	–
Whitewalls	Chirk; SJ2863137576; 52.930824°N 3.0631923°W	29 July 1998			20259	–

== See also ==
- Grade II listed buildings in Wrexham County Borough
