= Glyndŵr (district) =

Former district of Clwyd, Wales

Coordinates: 52.996°N 3.393°W

- District
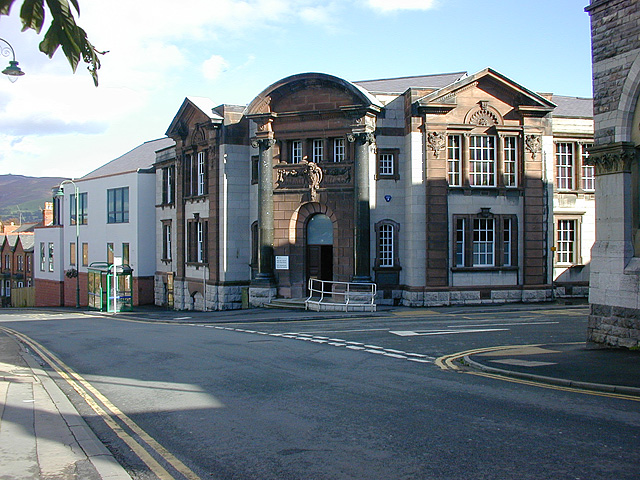
- County Hall, Ruthin: Council's headquarters

- History
  - Created: 1 April 1975
  - Abolished: 31 March 1996
  - Succeeded by: Denbighshire; Wrexham; Powys
  - HQ: Ruthin
- Contained within
  - County Council: Clwyd

Glyndŵr was one of six local government districts in the county of Clwyd in Wales from 1974 to 1996.

== History ==
The district was created on 1 April 1974, under the Local Government Act 1972. It covered the area of six former districts and two parishes from a seventh district, which were all abolished at the same time:

- Ceiriog Rural District
- Denbigh Municipal Borough
- Edeyrnion Rural District
- Llangollen Urban District
- Llangollen Rural parish from Wrexham Rural District
- Llantysilio parish from Wrexham Rural District
- Ruthin Municipal Borough
- Ruthin Rural District

The Edeyrnion Rural District had been in the administrative county of Merioneth prior to the reforms, whereas all the other parts of the new district had been in Denbighshire.

The district was named after Owain Glyndŵr, who had lived in the area at Glyndyfrdwy in the late 14th and early 15th centuries.

In 1996 the district was abolished under the Local Government (Wales) Act 1994, which saw Clwyd County Council and its constituent districts abolished, being replaced by principal areas, whose councils perform the functions which had previously been divided between the county and district councils. The area of Glyndŵr was divided between three principal areas with effect from 1 April 1996: the majority went to Denbighshire, with smaller areas going to Wrexham and Powys.

== Political control ==
The first election to the council was held in 1973, initially operating as a shadow authority alongside the outgoing authorities until it came into its powers on 1 April 1974. Throughout the council's existence the majority of the seats on the council were held by independent councillors:

Party in control	Years
Independent	1974–1996

== Premises ==
The council was based at County Hall on Wynnstay Road in Ruthin. The building had been built in 1909 for the former Denbighshire County Council. After Glyndŵr District Council's abolition in 1996 the building became the headquarters of the new Denbighshire County Council.
