= Llangollen Rural District =

Abolished Welsh rural district

Llangollen
- Area
  - 1901: 23,295 acres (94.27 km^{2})
  - 1931: 23,295 acres (94.27 km^{2})
- Population
  - 1901: 3,521
  - 1931: 3,464
- History
  - Created: 1894
  - Abolished: 1935
  - Succeeded by: Ruthin Rural District; Wrexham Rural District
- Status: Rural District

Llangollen was a rural district in the administrative county of Denbighshire, Wales, from 1894 to 1935. The rural district comprised part of the existing Corwen Rural Sanitary District, and consisted of three civil parishes:

- Bryneglwys
- Llangollen Rural
- Llantysilio

The district was abolished by a County Review Order in 1935, most of the area passing to Wrexham Rural District, and a small part to Ruthin Rural District.

== Sources ==
- Denbighshire Administrative County (Vision of Britain)
