= Grade II listed buildings in Holt, Wrexham =

Map of the community in Wrexham County Borough.

In the United Kingdom, the term listed building refers to a building or other structure officially designated as being of special architectural, historical, or cultural significance; Grade II structures are those considered to be "buildings of special interest which justify every effort being made to preserve them". Listing was begun by a provision in the Town and Country Planning Act 1947. Once listed, strict limitations are imposed on the modifications allowed to a building's structure or fittings. In Wales, the authority for listing under the Planning (Listed Buildings and Conservation Areas) Act 1990 rests with Cadw.

This is a list of the 20 Grade II listed buildings in the community of Holt, in Wrexham County Borough.

Name	Location Grid Ref. (Note: Sometimes known as OSGB36, the grid reference is based on the British national grid reference system used by the Ordnance Survey.) Geo-coordinates	Date Listed	Type/Function	Notes	Reference Number	Image
2 Frog Lane, Holt, LL13 9JA	Holt; SJ4080153919; 53.079199°N 2.8851677°W	17 July 1996	Domestic		16964	–
1 Holt Hall (including the Peking Garden)	Holt; SJ4097753836; 53.078472°N 2.8825254°W	9 June 1952			1538	–
2 Holt Hall (including the Peking Garden)	Holt; SJ4098353844; 53.078545°N 2.8824374°W	9 June 1952			16967	–
Borras Farm	Holt; SJ3525652506; 53.065854°N 2.9676456°W	7 June 1963			1564	–
Cornish Hall	Holt; SJ3885452346; 53.064841°N 2.9139288°W	9 June 1952	Religious, Ritual and Funerary		1536	–
Deeside Farmhouse	Holt; SJ4126753907; 53.079142°N 2.87821°W	17 July 1996	Domestic		16963	–
Former Baptist Chapel (including forecourt walls, gates and railings)	Holt; SJ4093753810; 53.078234°N 2.8831177°W	17 July 1996	Domestic		16959	–
Former Wages Office at Bellis' Farm	Holt; SJ4070053545; 53.075826°N 2.8866061°W	17 July 1996	Domestic		16965	–
Gates, Gate-piers and Railings at W entrance to churchyard at Parish Church of St Chad	Holt; SJ4114254106; 53.080917°N 2.8801122°W	17 July 1996	Domestic		16961	–
Holt Hill	Holt; SJ4100854328; 53.082898°N 2.8821532°W	9 June 1952			1540	–
New Holt Lodge Farm	Holt; SJ3796151271; 53.055076°N 2.9270456°W	9 June 1952	Domestic		1541	–
Pate Gate	Holt; SJ4053353417; 53.074657°N 2.8890748°W	17 July 1996	Domestic		16966	–
Plas Bostock	Holt; SJ3800352747; 53.068347°N 2.9267038°W	9 June 1952	Domestic		1537	–
Presbyterian Church (including forecourt walls and railings)	Holt; SJ4094353766; 53.077839°N 2.88302°W	17 July 1996	Agriculture and Subsistence		16957	–
Puddleducks (including forecourt walls and railings)	Holt; SJ4093453752; 53.077712°N 2.8831518°W	17 July 1996	Transport		16958	–
Smithfield House	Holt; SJ4089353635; 53.076656°N 2.8837422°W	9 June 1952	Transport		1539	–
Strawberry Pickers' Barracks at Bellis' Farm	Holt; SJ4069753672; 53.076967°N 2.8866743°W	12 April 1996	Civil		16841	–
Sundial in churchyard at Parish Church of St Chad	Holt; SJ4120454086; 53.080744°N 2.8791831°W	17 July 1996	Domestic		16960	–
Village Cross	Holt; SJ4103253907; 53.079116°N 2.8817176°W	9 June 1952	Domestic		1542	–
War Memorial (including railings)	Holt; SJ4103353895; 53.079009°N 2.8817004°W	17 July 1996	Commercial		16962	–

== See also ==
- Grade II listed buildings in Wrexham County Borough
