= Grade II listed buildings in Llansantffraid Glyn Ceiriog =

Map of the community in Wrexham County Borough.

In the United Kingdom, the term listed building refers to a building or other structure officially designated as being of special architectural, historical, or cultural significance; Grade II structures are those considered to be "buildings of special interest which justify every effort being made to preserve them". Listing was begun by a provision in the Town and Country Planning Act 1947. Once listed, strict limitations are imposed on the modifications allowed to a building's structure or fittings. In Wales, the authority for listing under the Planning (Listed Buildings and Conservation Areas) Act 1990 rests with Cadw.

This is a list of the ten Grade II listed buildings in the community of Llansantffraid Glyn Ceiriog, in Wrexham County Borough.

Name	Location Grid Ref. (Note: Sometimes known as OSGB36, the grid reference is based on the British national grid reference system used by the Ordnance Survey.) Geo-coordinates	Date Listed	Type/Function	Notes	Reference Number	Image
1 Orley House	Llansantffraid Glyn Ceiriog; SJ2038538439; 52.937419°N 3.1860517°W	08 July 2003	Religious, Ritual and Funerary		81284	–
2 Orley House	Llansantffraid Glyn Ceiriog; SJ2038038437; 52.9374°N 3.1861256°W	08 July 2003	Religious, Ritual and Funerary		81285	–
Church of St Ffraid	Llansantffraid Glyn Ceiriog; SJ2046938440; 52.937441°N 3.1848024°W	08 July 2003	Domestic		81287	–
Former House S of the Woolpack	Llansantffraid Glyn Ceiriog; SJ1953635853; 52.914051°N 3.1980391°W	08 July 2003	Commercial		81288	–
Glyn Valley Hotel	Llansantffraid Glyn Ceiriog; SJ2016537773; 52.931401°N 3.1891602°W	08 July 2003	Gardens, Parks and Urban Spaces		81289	–
Grave Monument to Rev Robert Ellis (Cynddelw)	Llansantffraid Glyn Ceiriog; SJ2058537742; 52.931185°N 3.1829057°W	08 July 2003			81290	–
Locomotive Shed, Glyn Valley Tramway	Llansantffraid Glyn Ceiriog; SJ2028437817; 52.931814°N 3.187401°W	08 July 2003			81292	–
Milestone W of Ddol Hir	Llansantffraid Glyn Ceiriog; SJ2003636896; 52.9235°N 3.1908625°W	08 July 2003	Domestic		81293	–
Telephone call box opposite Nos 1 & 2 Orley House	Llansantffraid Glyn Ceiriog; SJ2039838437; 52.937403°N 3.1858578°W	21 December 2004			83254	–
The Vicarage	Llansantffraid Glyn Ceiriog; SJ2031538123; 52.934569°N 3.1870152°W	08 July 2003	Commemorative		81295	–

== See also ==
- Grade II listed buildings in Wrexham County Borough
