= Grade II listed buildings in Gwersyllt =

Map of the community in Wrexham County Borough.

In the United Kingdom, the term listed building refers to a building or other structure officially designated as being of special architectural, historical, or cultural significance; Grade II structures are those considered to be "buildings of special interest which justify every effort being made to preserve them". Listing was begun by a provision in the Town and Country Planning Act 1947. Once listed, strict limitations are imposed on the modifications allowed to a building's structure or fittings. In Wales, the authority for listing under the Planning (Listed Buildings and Conservation Areas) Act 1990 rests with Cadw.

This is a list of the eleven Grade II listed buildings in the community of Gwersyllt, in Wrexham County Borough.

Name	Location Grid Ref. (Note: Sometimes known as OSGB36, the grid reference is based on the British national grid reference system used by the Ordnance Survey.) Geo-coordinates	Date Listed	Type/Function	Notes	Reference Number	Image
Bridge over Former Railway	Gwersyllt; SJ3146152243; 53.063017°N 3.0242138°W	1 December 1995	Domestic		16535	–
Church of the Holy Trinity	Gwersyllt; SJ3162053545; 53.074739°N 3.0221187°W	1 December 1995	Religious, Ritual and Funerary		16533	–
Former Llay Hall Collery Engine House	Gwersyllt; SJ3156155120; 53.088887°N 3.0233349°W	26 September 1994	Domestic		15827	–
Former Llay Hall Colliery Chimney and Flue	Gwersyllt; SJ3151855049; 53.088243°N 3.0239617°W	26 September 1994	Domestic		15830	–
Former Llay Hall Colliery Washery Building	Gwersyllt; SJ3162355062; 53.088373°N 3.022397°W	26 September 1994	Domestic		15828	–
Former Llay Hall Colliery Workshops	Gwersyllt; SJ3149155228; 53.089848°N 3.024403°W	26 September 1994	Domestic		15829	–
Henblas	Gwersyllt; SJ3143652498; 53.065305°N 3.0246412°W	1 December 1995	Commercial		16536	–
Lower Stansty Farmhouse	Gwersyllt; SJ3249452339; 53.064011°N 3.0088218°W	1 December 1995	Domestic		16537	–
Rock Cottage	Gwersyllt; SJ3129255289; 53.090371°N 3.0273869°W	2 July 1975	Domestic		1714	–
Stansty Park with attached Garden Gateway	Gwersyllt; SJ3195252385; 53.064356°N 3.0169182°W	9 June 1952	Domestic		1535	–
War Memorial with Railings to Memorial Gardens	Gwersyllt; SJ3179353188; 53.071552°N 3.019461°W	1 December 1995	Domestic		16534	–

== See also ==
- Grade II listed buildings in Wrexham County Borough
