= Grade II listed buildings in Esclusham =

Map of the community in Wrexham County Borough.

In the United Kingdom, the term listed building refers to a building or other structure officially designated as being of special architectural, historical, or cultural significance; Grade II structures are those considered to be "buildings of special interest which justify every effort being made to preserve them". Listing was begun by a provision in the Town and Country Planning Act 1947. Once listed, strict limitations are imposed on the modifications allowed to a building's structure or fittings. In Wales, the authority for listing under the Planning (Listed Buildings and Conservation Areas) Act 1990 rests with Cadw.

This is a list of the 30 Grade II listed buildings in the community of Esclusham, in Wrexham County Borough.

Name	Location Grid Ref. (Note: Sometimes known as OSGB36, the grid reference is based on the British national grid reference system used by the Ordnance Survey.) Geo-coordinates	Date Listed	Type/Function	Notes	Reference Number	Image
1-3 Laurel Grove, Bersham	Esclusham; SJ3159349267; 53.036286°N 3.0216115°W	8 December 1995	Domestic		16563	–
2 Mill Terrace, Bersham	Esclusham; SJ3065249215; 53.035697°N 3.035631°W	8 December 1995	Domestic		16541	–
3 Mill Terrace, Bersham	Esclusham; SJ3065649211; 53.035662°N 3.0355705°W	8 December 1995	Domestic		16546	–
4 Mill Terrace, Bersham	Esclusham; SJ3066649196; 53.035529°N 3.0354182°W	8 December 1995	Domestic		16547	–
5 Mill Terrace, Bersham	Esclusham; SJ3066849195; 53.03552°N 3.0353881°W	8 December 1995	Domestic		16550	–
6 Mill Terrace, Bersham	Esclusham; SJ3066949189; 53.035466°N 3.0353719°W	8 December 1995	Domestic		16549	–
Barn Range at Esclusham Hall	Esclusham; SJ2961348090; 53.025451°N 3.0508768°W	8 December 1995	Domestic		16574	–
Bersham Colliery Winding Engine House	Esclusham; SJ3144148206; 53.026731°N 3.023652°W	7 October 1994	Domestic		15825	–
Bersham Lodge	Esclusham; SJ3020449441; 53.03767°N 3.0423598°W	8 December 1995	Domestic		16556	–
Bersham Mill including cast-iron feed pipe	Esclusham; SJ3066949243; 53.035951°N 3.0353836°W	8 December 1995	Domestic		16538	–
Bridge Cottages	Esclusham; SJ3098849150; 53.035157°N 3.0306072°W	8 December 1995			16560	–
Bridge, Gates and Railings at Bersham Lodge	Esclusham; SJ3019149443; 53.037687°N 3.0425541°W	8 December 1995	Domestic		16557	–
Caeau Weir	Esclusham; SJ3041849370; 53.03706°N 3.0391535°W	8 December 1995	Domestic		16555	–
Church of The Holy Trinity	Esclusham; SJ3152848582; 53.030121°N 3.022435°W	21 October 2008	Commercial		87572	–
Croesfoel Farmhouse	Esclusham; SJ3087348162; 53.026262°N 3.0321098°W	8 December 1995	Religious, Ritual and Funerary		16571	–
East Weir on River Clywedog	Esclusham; SJ3084749171; 53.035327°N 3.0327141°W	8 December 1995	Commercial		16552	–
Former Bersham Colliery Baths, Canteen and Offices	Esclusham; SJ3143148097; 53.02575°N 3.0237778°W	7 October 1994	Agriculture and Subsistence		15826	–
Gate Piers at Hafod-y-Bwch Hall	Esclusham; SJ3084448101; 53.02571°N 3.032529°W	7 June 1963	Religious, Ritual and Funerary		16572	–
Hafod House	Esclusham; SJ3125746063; 53.007447°N 3.0259378°W	7 June 1963	Domestic		1588	–
Hafod House Farmhouse	Esclusham; SJ3125846078; 53.007581°N 3.0259261°W	7 June 1963	Domestic		1589	–
Hafod-y-bwch Bridge	Esclusham; SJ3199247940; 53.02441°N 3.0153819°W	8 December 1995	Domestic		16564	–
Mill House Farmhouse	Esclusham; SJ3063749236; 53.035884°N 3.0358592°W	8 December 1995	Domestic		16540	–
Nant Bridge	Esclusham; SJ2909550004; 53.042584°N 3.0590199°W	8 December 1995	Religious, Ritual and Funerary		16559	–
Pentrebychan Hall Dovecote	Esclusham; SJ3005147882; 53.023639°N 3.0443025°W	4 April 1977	Domestic		1715	–
Plas Grono Lodge	Esclusham; SJ3192347661; 53.021894°N 3.0163515°W	8 December 1995	Commercial		16565	–
Squires Cottage	Esclusham; SJ3105549162; 53.035273°N 3.0296108°W	7 June 1963	Domestic		1560	–
Tan-y-Llan	Esclusham; SJ2839748057; 53.024992°N 3.0689959°W	7 June 1963			1585	–
The White House	Esclusham; SJ3072149102; 53.034691°N 3.0345779°W	8 December 1995	Domestic		16561	–
Timber-framed Barn in Yard at Hafod-y-Bwch Hall	Esclusham; SJ3102847891; 53.023847°N 3.0297412°W	8 December 1995			16569	–
Timber-framed building in yard at Croesfoel Farm	Esclusham; SJ3087848192; 53.026532°N 3.0320417°W	8 December 1995	Domestic		16573	–

== See also ==
- Grade II listed buildings in Wrexham County Borough
