= Ruthin Rural District =

Abolished Welsh rural district

Ruthin
- Area
  - 1901: 94,540 acres (382.6 km^{2})
  - 1961: 98,651 acres
- Population
  - 1901: 9,170
  - 1971: 9,087
- History
  - Created: 1894
  - Abolished: 1935
  - Succeeded by: Glyndŵr
- Status: Rural District
  - HQ: Ruthin

Ruthin was a rural district in the administrative county of Denbighshire from 1894 to 1974.

The rural district was formed from the area of Ruthin Rural Sanitary District.

The district originally contained nineteen civil parishes:

- Aberwheeler Rural
- Clocaenog
- Derwen
- Efenechtid
- Llanarmon-yn-Iâl
- Llanbedr Dyffryn Clwyd
- Llandegla
- Llandyrnog Rural
- Llaneldian
- Llanfair Dyffryn Clwyd Rural
- Llanferres
- Llanfwrog Rural
- Llangwyfan
- Llangynhafal
- Llanrhaedr yng Nghinmeirch Rural
- Llanrhydd Rural
- Llanynys Rural
- Nantglyn
- Y Gyffilliog

A County Review Order in 1935 added the parish of Bryneglwys from the abolished Llangollen Rural District. At the same time a new parish of Llandyrnog was formed by the merger of Llandyrnog Rural and Llangwyfan, and Llangynhafal parish absorbed Llanhychan.

Ruthin Rural District was abolished in 1974 by the Local Government Act 1972, becoming part of the district of Glyndŵr, in the new county of Clwyd.

== Sources ==
Denbighshire Administrative County (Vision of Britain)
