= Grade II listed buildings in Marchwiel =

Map of the community in Wrexham County Borough.

In the United Kingdom, the term listed building refers to a building or other structure officially designated as being of special architectural, historical, or cultural significance; Grade II structures are those considered to be "buildings of special interest which justify every effort being made to preserve them". Listing was begun by a provision in the Town and Country Planning Act 1947. Once listed, strict limitations are imposed on the modifications allowed to a building's structure or fittings. In Wales, the authority for listing under the Planning (Listed Buildings and Conservation Areas) Act 1990 rests with Cadw.

This is a list of the 41 Grade II listed buildings in the community of Marchwiel, in Wrexham County Borough.

Name	Location Grid Ref. (Note: Sometimes known as OSGB36, the grid reference is based on the British national grid reference system used by the Ordnance Survey.) Geo-coordinates	Date Listed	Type/Function	Notes	Reference Number	Image
Bridge over the Black Brook	Marchwiel; SJ3254248552; 53.029981°N 3.0073115°W	03 December 1996	Religious, Ritual and Funerary		17870	–
Bridge over the River Clywedog	Marchwiel; SJ3277948802; 53.032258°N 3.0038304°W	03 December 1996			17871	–
Bryn Goleu	Marchwiel; SJ3236147668; 53.022013°N 3.0098243°W	03 December 1996	Domestic		17873	–
Churchyard walls, gatepiers, railings and gates to S of Church of SS Marcella and Deiniol	Marchwiel; SJ3571847694; 53.022661°N 2.9597906°W	03 December 1996			17849	–
Coachman's House	Marchwiel; SJ3261748093; 53.025865°N 3.0060974°W	03 December 1996	Religious, Ritual and Funerary		17865	–
Combined Pigsties and Hen House at New Sontley Farm	Marchwiel; SJ3339748283; 53.02767°N 2.9945092°W	03 December 1996	Religious, Ritual and Funerary		17878	–
Cupola to SE of the house	Marchwiel; SJ3261748199; 53.026817°N 3.0061195°W	03 December 1996	Religious, Ritual and Funerary		17851	–
Dog Yard Range	Marchwiel; SJ3263948120; 53.02611°N 3.005775°W	07 June 1963	Domestic		17854	–
Dovecote	Marchwiel; SJ3277948090; 53.025858°N 3.0036818°W	03 December 1996	Agriculture and Subsistence		17864	–
Former Haybarn to Outer Yard	Marchwiel; SJ3260048126; 53.026159°N 3.0063577°W	07 June 1963	Domestic		17852	–
Former House at The Groves	Marchwiel; SJ3370845786; 53.005266°N 2.9893592°W	03 December 1996	Domestic		17880	–
Former Stables at New Sontley Farm	Marchwiel; SJ3339648216; 53.027068°N 2.9945102°W	03 December 1996	Domestic		17877	–
Garden walls to N side of formal garden including gatepiers, gates and alcove	Marchwiel; SJ3274148327; 53.027984°N 3.0042978°W	03 December 1996	Commercial		17858	–
Garden walls to S side of formal garden including gate piers, gates and alcove	Marchwiel; SJ3264848165; 53.026516°N 3.0056503°W	03 December 1996	Education		17860	–
Gardener's House including Bothies, walls and shed to W	Marchwiel; SJ3264148149; 53.026371°N 3.0057513°W	07 June 1963	Domestic		17855	–
Gatepiers and attached gates and railings on N drive	Marchwiel; SJ3253448503; 53.029539°N 3.0074205°W	03 December 1996	Industrial		17867	–
Gatepiers and gates to the forecourt at Erddig	Marchwiel; SJ3259848095; 53.02588°N 3.006381°W	03 December 1996	Industrial		17866	–
Gatepiers, Railings and Gates at Forest Lodge entrance	Marchwiel; SJ3330647793; 53.023255°N 2.9957643°W	03 December 1996	Commercial		17874	–
Hydraulic Ram	Marchwiel; SJ3249348422; 53.028806°N 3.0080148°W	03 December 1996	Domestic		17868	–
Ivydale	Marchwiel; SJ3583447111; 53.017435°N 2.9579454°W	03 December 1996	Domestic		17845	–
Kiln Farmhouse including former Malthouse to rear	Marchwiel; SJ3373946566; 53.012281°N 2.9890576°W	03 December 1996	Commercial		17879	–
Marchwiel Hall	Marchwiel; SJ3441747970; 53.024983°N 2.9792395°W	03 December 1996			17840	–
Marchwiel Old Hall	Marchwiel; SJ3500447237; 53.018467°N 2.9703413°W	03 December 1996	Agriculture and Subsistence		17847	–
Milestone	Marchwiel; SJ3548347796; 53.023549°N 2.963314°W	23 August 2016	Domestic		87687	–
Mill House	Marchwiel; SJ3406048273; 53.027663°N 2.9846233°W	03 December 1996	Domestic		17844	–
N Garden Pavilion including attached walls, alcove gatepiers and gates immediately to E of the house	Marchwiel; SJ3261048258; 53.027347°N 3.0062362°W	09 June 1952	Religious, Ritual and Funerary		17856	–
New Sontley Farmhouse	Marchwiel; SJ3342048282; 53.027664°N 2.9941661°W	03 December 1996	Domestic		17876	–
Old Sontley Hall	Marchwiel; SJ3308246271; 53.009548°N 2.9987872°W	09 June 1952	Commercial		1548	–
Pair of pinnacles in the formal garden at Erddig	Marchwiel; SJ3268748246; 53.027249°N 3.0050858°W	03 December 1996	Commercial		17862	–
Pigsties at Marchwiel Hall	Marchwiel; SJ3438548078; 53.02595°N 2.9797386°W	03 December 1996	Civil		17843	–
S Garden Pavilion including attached walls, alcove gatepiers and gates immediately to E of house	Marchwiel; SJ3261448218; 53.026988°N 3.0061682°W	09 June 1952	Religious, Ritual and Funerary		17857	–
Sawmill	Marchwiel; SJ3262648133; 53.026225°N 3.0059716°W	07 June 1963	Health and Welfare		17853	–
Sontley Bridge	Marchwiel; SJ3359848482; 53.029484°N 2.9915537°W	31 January 1994	Commemorative		17875	–
Stables at Marchwiel Hall	Marchwiel; SJ3439348020; 53.02543°N 2.9796075°W	03 December 1996	Domestic		17841	–
Sundial near the N end of the formal garden	Marchwiel; SJ3284448300; 53.027754°N 3.0027566°W	03 December 1996	Education		17863	–
Sundial on main axis of the formal garden	Marchwiel; SJ3262748239; 53.027178°N 3.0059788°W	03 December 1996	Education		17861	–
The Groves	Marchwiel; SJ3370445763; 53.005059°N 2.9894141°W	07 June 1963	Health and Welfare		1616	–
The Lodge	Marchwiel; SJ3245347737; 53.022644°N 3.0084675°W	03 December 1996			17872	–
The Old Rectory	Marchwiel; SJ3462647507; 53.020848°N 2.9760301°W	03 December 1996			17846	–
Walled Garden and Bothy at Marchwiel Hall	Marchwiel; SJ3447148045; 53.025664°N 2.9784498°W	03 December 1996	Domestic		17842	–
Wood House	Marchwiel; SJ3475546697; 53.013583°N 2.9739433°W	03 December 1996	Commercial		17848	–

== See also ==
- Grade II listed buildings in Wrexham County Borough
