= Grade II listed buildings in Coedpoeth =

Map of the community in Wrexham County Borough.

In the United Kingdom, the term listed building refers to a building or other structure officially designated as being of special architectural, historical, or cultural significance; Grade II structures are those considered to be "buildings of special interest which justify every effort being made to preserve them". Listing was begun by a provision in the Town and Country Planning Act 1947. Once listed, strict limitations are imposed on the modifications allowed to a building's structure or fittings. In Wales, the authority for listing under the Planning (Listed Buildings and Conservation Areas) Act 1990 rests with Cadw.

This is a list of the 17 Grade II listed buildings in the community of Coedpoeth, in Wrexham County Borough.

Name	Location Grid Ref. (Note: Sometimes known as OSGB36, the grid reference is based on the British national grid reference system used by the Ordnance Survey.) Geo-coordinates	Date Listed	Type/Function	Notes	Reference Number	Image
Bath House in Plas Power Park	Coedpoeth; SJ2988049929; 53.042014°N 3.0472972°W	26 October 1995	Agriculture and Subsistence		16453	–
Caeau Bridge	Coedpoeth; SJ3043449337; 53.036766°N 3.0389078°W	08 December 1995	Domestic		16554	–
Capel Salem with railings to forecourt	Coedpoeth; SJ2832851257; 53.053743°N 3.0707369°W	26 October 1995	Industrial		16449	–
Dairy at Plas Power	Coedpoeth; SJ2980949818; 53.041007°N 3.0483318°W	30 January 1992	Religious, Ritual and Funerary		1738	–
Entrance Gates to Park	Coedpoeth; SJ2834751039; 53.051786°N 3.070405°W	26 October 1995	Gardens, Parks and Urban Spaces		16451	–
Game Larder at Plas Power	Coedpoeth; SJ2991249829; 53.041119°N 3.0467983°W	30 January 1992	Industrial		1737	–
Higher Berse Farmhouse	Coedpoeth; SJ3048751169; 53.053238°N 3.0385133°W	26 October 1995	Commercial		16457	–
Ice-House at Plas Power	Coedpoeth; SJ2976349963; 53.042304°N 3.0490494°W	30 January 1992	Domestic		1739	–
Llydiart Fanny Farmhouse	Coedpoeth; SJ2925051622; 53.057147°N 3.0570644°W	07 June 1963	Domestic		1561	–
Railings and Gates to West Entrance Drive at Plas Power	Coedpoeth; SJ2910050158; 53.043969°N 3.0589793°W	30 January 1992	Commercial		16454	–
Rhosberse Lodge at Entrance to West drive at Plas Power	Coedpoeth; SJ2910850165; 53.044033°N 3.0588615°W	30 January 1992	Domestic		1740	–
Stable Block at Plas Power	Coedpoeth; SJ2986650019; 53.042821°N 3.0475256°W	26 October 1995	Transport		16452	–
Tyn-y-Coed	Coedpoeth; SJ2931051123; 53.05267°N 3.0560596°W	07 June 1963	Commercial		1562	–
Wall to Plas Power Park including Park Cottage	Coedpoeth; SJ2925950593; 53.0479°N 3.0567038°W	26 October 1995	Commercial		16455	–
Wall to Plas Power Park SW of Rhosberse Lodge	Coedpoeth; SJ2910650197; 53.04432°N 3.0588984°W	26 October 1995	Domestic		16456	–
War Memorial	Coedpoeth; SJ2832051032; 53.05172°N 3.0708061°W	26 October 1995			16450	–
Western Weir on the River Clywedog	Coedpoeth; SJ2985249508; 53.038226°N 3.047623°W	08 December 1995	Domestic		16558	–

== See also ==
- Grade II listed buildings in Wrexham County Borough
