= Grade II listed buildings in Minera =

Map of the community in Wrexham County Borough.

In the United Kingdom, the term listed building refers to a building or other structure officially designated as being of special architectural, historical, or cultural significance; Grade II structures are those considered to be "buildings of special interest which justify every effort being made to preserve them". Listing was begun by a provision in the Town and Country Planning Act 1947. Once listed, strict limitations are imposed on the modifications allowed to a building's structure or fittings. In Wales, the authority for listing under the Planning (Listed Buildings and Conservation Areas) Act 1990 rests with Cadw.

This is a list of the 18 Grade II listed buildings in the community of Minera, in Wrexham County Borough.

Name	Location Grid Ref. (Note: Sometimes known as OSGB36, the grid reference is based on the British national grid reference system used by the Ordnance Survey.) Geo-coordinates	Date Listed	Type/Function	Notes	Reference Number	Image
Atcherley Lime Kilns	Minera; SJ2615551774; 53.058093°N 3.1032685°W	22 April 1998	Domestic		19717	–
Cae Mynydd	Minera; SJ2696851439; 53.055195°N 3.0910643°W	22 April 1998	Religious, Ritual and Funerary		19716	–
Chimney near Meadow Engine House	Minera; SJ2748850945; 53.050826°N 3.0831963°W	22 April 1998	Transport		19718	–
Church of St Andrew	Minera; SJ2795450242; 53.044571°N 3.0760883°W	22 April 1998	Domestic		19725	–
Church of St Mary	Minera; SJ2689251965; 53.059912°N 3.0923176°W	22 April 1998	Gardens, Parks and Urban Spaces		19715	–
Gwylfa	Minera; SJ2739050803; 53.049536°N 3.0846259°W	22 April 1998	Domestic		19720	–
Jones Cottages	Minera; SJ2743350753; 53.049093°N 3.0839733°W	22 April 1998			19721	–
Lime Kiln	Minera; SJ2747950307; 53.04509°N 3.0831867°W	22 April 1998	Domestic		19726	–
Maelor House	Minera; SJ2728550927; 53.050636°N 3.08622°W	22 April 1998	Domestic		19722	–
Maelor View	Minera; SJ2728050934; 53.050698°N 3.0862961°W	22 April 1998	Water Supply and Drainage		19723	–
Meadow (or City) Engine House	Minera; SJ2749950932; 53.05071°N 3.0830293°W	12 September 1977	Transport		1716	–
Offa View	Minera; SJ2731350891; 53.050317°N 3.0857942°W	22 April 1998	Domestic		19724	–
Pen-y-Nant	Minera; SJ2673251939; 53.059656°N 3.0946986°W	22 April 1998	Domestic		19719	–
Plas Gwyn including Plas Bychan	Minera; SJ2710551791; 53.058377°N 3.0891006°W	07 June 1963	Commercial		1617	–
Ty Brith	Minera; SJ2679251752; 53.057984°N 3.0937609°W	07 June 1963	Communications		1618	–
Ty Hir	Minera; SJ2465352144; 53.061209°N 3.1257614°W	07 June 1963	Transport		1619	–
Wern Cottages	Minera; SJ2778750783; 53.04941°N 3.0787002°W	22 April 1998	Agriculture and Subsistence		19727	–
Wern Farm	Minera; SJ2788950325; 53.045308°N 3.0770763°W	22 April 1998	Domestic		19728	–

== See also ==
- Grade II listed buildings in Wrexham County Borough
