= Grade II listed buildings in Sesswick =

Map of the community in Wrexham County Borough.

In the United Kingdom, the term listed building refers to a building or other structure officially designated as being of special architectural, historical, or cultural significance; Grade II structures are those considered to be "buildings of special interest which justify every effort being made to preserve them". Listing was begun by a provision in the Town and Country Planning Act 1947. Once listed, strict limitations are imposed on the modifications allowed to a building's structure or fittings. In Wales, the authority for listing under the Planning (Listed Buildings and Conservation Areas) Act 1990 rests with Cadw.

This is a list of the ten Grade II listed buildings in the community of Sesswick, in Wrexham County Borough.

| Name | Location Grid Ref. (Note: Sometimes known as OSGB36, the grid reference is based on the British national grid reference system used by the Ordnance Survey.) Geo-coordinates | Date Listed | Type/Function | Notes | Reference Number | Image |
|---|---|---|---|---|---|---|
| Bedwell Hall | Sesswick; SJ3758447313; 53.019458°N 2.9319018°W | 20 December 1996 | Agriculture and Subsistence | | 18057 | – |
| Dovecote at Pickhill Old Hall | Sesswick; SJ3892046925; 53.016125°N 2.9119149°W | 07 June 1963 | Domestic | | 1637 | – |
| Gate and gate-piers at Pickhill Hall Lodge | Sesswick; SJ3993947324; 53.019826°N 2.896802°W | 20 December 1996 | Domestic | | 18061 | – |
| Parkey Farmhouse | Sesswick; SJ3801847830; 53.024155°N 2.9255325°W | 20 December 1996 | Domestic | | 18062 | – |
| Pickhill Bridge | Sesswick; SJ3963648220; 53.027846°N 2.9014863°W | 20 December 1996 | Domestic | | 18059 | – |
| Pickhill Farmhouse | Sesswick; SJ3916547790; 53.023927°N 2.9084268°W | 07 June 1963 | Domestic | | 1638 | – |
| Pickhill Hall | Sesswick; SJ4019947208; 53.018813°N 2.8929051°W | 07 June 1963 | Domestic | | 1636 | – |
| Pickhill Hall Lodge | Sesswick; SJ3994647308; 53.019683°N 2.8966947°W | 20 December 1996 | Domestic | | 18060 | – |
| Pum-Rhyd | Sesswick; SJ3748148119; 53.02669°N 2.9335935°W | 20 December 1996 | Domestic | | 18058 | – |
| Talwrn House | Sesswick; SJ3882447807; 53.024041°N 2.9135132°W | 20 December 1996 | Gardens, Parks and Urban Spaces | | 18063 | – |

== See also ==
- Grade II listed buildings in Wrexham County Borough
