= Grade II listed buildings in Broughton, Wrexham =

Map of the community in Wrexham County Borough.

In the United Kingdom, the term listed building refers to a building or other structure officially designated as being of special architectural, historical, or cultural significance; Grade II structures are those considered to be "buildings of special interest which justify every effort being made to preserve them". Listing was begun by a provision in the Town and Country Planning Act 1947. Once listed, strict limitations are imposed on the modifications allowed to a building's structure or fittings. In Wales, the authority for listing under the Planning (Listed Buildings and Conservation Areas) Act 1990 rests with Cadw.

This is a list of the eighteen Grade II listed buildings in the community of Broughton, in Wrexham County Borough.

Name	Location Grid Ref. (Note: Sometimes known as OSGB36, the grid reference is based on the British national grid reference system used by the Ordnance Survey.) Geo-coordinates	Date Listed	Type/Function	Notes	Reference Number	Image
Berse Drelincourt Church	Broughton; SJ3170150967; 53.051579°N 3.020362°W	07 June 1963	Domestic		1566	–
Broughton Hall and Broughton Hall Farmhouse	Broughton; SJ3052352207; 53.062572°N 3.0382007°W	07 June 1963	Transport		1569	–
Bryn Seion Chapel	Broughton; SJ2985553854; 53.077287°N 3.0485265°W	03 June 1964	Domestic		9813	–
Church of St Peter	Broughton; SJ3085952463; 53.064916°N 3.0332428°W	01 December 1995	Health and Welfare		6633	–
Former Plas power Colliery Eastern winding Engine House	Broughton; SJ2997851907; 53.059804°N 3.0462664°W	26 September 1994	Domestic		15823	–
Former Plas Power Colliery Heapstead	Broughton; SJ3000051930; 53.060014°N 3.0459432°W	26 September 1994	Domestic		15824	–
Former Plas Power Colliery Power House	Broughton; SJ2987751958; 53.060249°N 3.0477843°W	26 September 1994	Domestic		15821	–
Former Plas Power Colliery Western Winding Engine House	Broughton; SJ2995651916; 53.059882°N 3.0465966°W	26 September 1994	Domestic		15822	–
Former Plas power Colliery Workshops	Broughton; SJ2991251933; 53.060029°N 3.0472567°W	26 September 1994	Agriculture and Subsistence		15820	–
Gatewen Hall	Broughton; SJ3159651447; 53.05588°N 3.0220302°W	13 October 1966	Agriculture and Subsistence		3176	
Millward House	Broughton; SJ3093351512; 53.056378°N 3.0319343°W	07 June 1963	Recreational		1570	–
No. 41 Westminster Road (W side), Pentre Broughton, Clwyd	Broughton; SJ3083053071; 53.070377°N 3.0338063°W	01 December 1995			16528	–
No. 42 Westminster Road (W side), Pentre Broughton, Clwyd	Broughton; SJ3082853078; 53.070439°N 3.0338377°W	01 December 1995	Agriculture and Subsistence		16529	–
No. 43 Westminster Road (W side), Pentre Broughton, Clwyd	Broughton; SJ3082653084; 53.070493°N 3.0338688°W	01 December 1995	Agriculture and Subsistence		16530	–
No. 44 Westminster Road (W side), Pentre Broughton, Clwyd	Broughton; SJ3082453091; 53.070556°N 3.0339002°W	01 December 1995			16531	–
No. 45 Westminster Road (W side), Pentre Broughton, Clwyd	Broughton; SJ3082353097; 53.07061°N 3.0339164°W	01 December 1995	Domestic		16532	–
Orphanage	Broughton; SJ3162750866; 53.050662°N 3.0214443°W	07 June 1963	Commercial		1568	–
The Vicarage	Broughton; SJ3006551387; 53.055142°N 3.0448554°W	01 December 1995	Domestic		9355	–

== See also ==
- Grade II listed buildings in Wrexham County Borough
