= St Mary's Church, Chirk =

Church in Wrexham County Borough, Wales

St Mary's Church
- St Mary's Church, Chirk
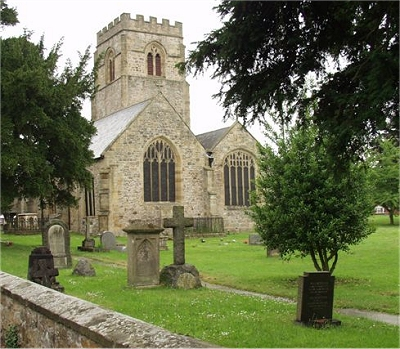

- Location in Wrexham
- 52°56′7″N 3°5′23″W
- Country: Wales
- Denomination: Church in Wales

History
- Dedication: St Mary

Architecture
- Heritage designation: Grade I
- Architectural type: Church

St Mary's is a Grade I listed parish church in Chirk, Wrexham County Borough, Wales. It stands at the south end of the main street of Chirk, within its own graveyard, on the northern edge of the valley of the Afon Ceiriog. The parish is in the Mission Area of Offa in the Church in Wales Diocese of St Asaph. The church is listed on the National Monuments Record of Wales.

== History ==
The original church, which had a similar footprint to that of the present building, was begun during the 11th century by the Normans, although it is believed that an older llan, dedicated to St Tysilio, had existed on the site. In 1519, William Edwards of New Hall extended the building by adding a nave. The tower was added to the west bay. It saw additional repairs and alterations in the 17th, 18th and 19th centuries. In 1828-9 the interior was remodelled, and alterations were made to the furnishings in 1877.

== Exterior ==
The church is constructed of sandstone with later buttresses. All but one of the windows are post-Norman. A 20th century stone extension is attached to the north end of the church, serving as a meeting hall. The slate roof is supported by 15th century trusses.

== Interior ==
The walls and the roof (below the rafters) are plastered. There are three floor levels from the nave to the altar. There are carvings of animals and knights on some trusses. There is a considerable number of monuments and furnishings ranging from the 17th to 19th centuries. Most window glass is 19th or 20th century. The tower contains a ring of six bells, dated 1803 by Rudhall of Gloucester.

== See also ==
- Grade I listed buildings in Wrexham County Borough
