= Caia Park =

Community in Wrexham County Borough, Wales

Caia Park: Welsh: Parc Caia
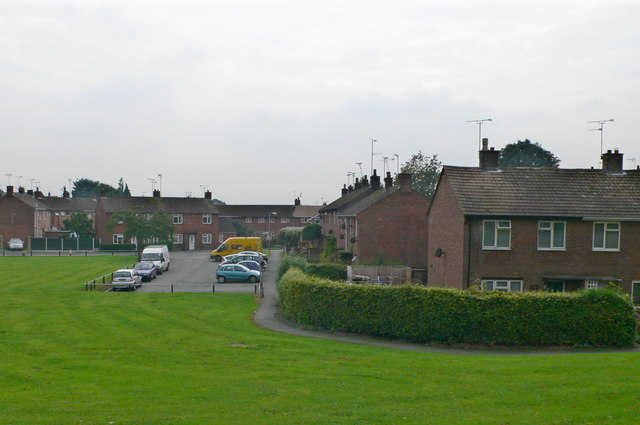
- Part of the Caia Park estate, Wrexham

- Location within Wrexham
- Population: 12,602 (2011 Census)
- OS grid reference: SJ 34856 50156
- Principal area: Wrexham
- Preserved county: Clwyd
- Country: Wales
- Sovereign state: United Kingdom
- Post town: WREXHAM
- Postcode district: LL13
- Dialling code: 01978
- Police: North Wales
- Fire: North Wales
- Ambulance: Welsh
- UK Parliament: Wrexham
- Senedd Cymru – Welsh Parliament: Wrexham
- List of places UK Wales Wrexham 53.045°N 2.973°W Map of the community

Caia Park (Welsh: Parc Caia) is a suburb and community in Wrexham, Wrexham County Borough, Wales. It was created in 1985 after a Boundary Commission review resulted in the formation of four new community areas within Wrexham, the others being Acton, Offa, and Rhosddu. At the 2001 census, the community had a population of 11,882 in 5,019 households, increasing to 12,602 in 2011.

== History ==
The area takes its name from the old Caia or Ty'n y Caeau farm, which was eventually demolished for construction of the Wrexham and Ellesmere Railway. The name is a form of the plural for the Welsh language cae, "field". Caia became a ward of Wrexham Borough after the latter's creation in 1857.

The majority of the community area is occupied by the Caia Park development of local authority housing. Located south of Rhosnesni ward in the south-east of Wrexham city, it is the largest housing estate in Wales and by the 1990s housed a third of Wrexham's population. Much of the estate, originally called Queen's Park, was laid out in the early 1950s to plans by influential town planner and architect Gordon Stephenson.

By the 1960s the area had developed a reputation for social problems, and was one of two areas, along with Marseille in France, studied in this connection by the sociologist Patricia Elton Mayo (daughter of George Elton Mayo). Mayo stated that her study referred to only a few streets in the estate.

=== Caia Park riots ===
On two days in June 2003 there was rioting in Caia Park following tensions between local residents and Iraqi Kurdish refugees, about 60 of whom were housed in the area. About 200 local men, nominally associated with Wrexham football club, fought with police. 51 people appeared in court, of whom eight, all long-term residents, received custodial sentences of up to two years.

There was a further outbreak of violence on the estate on 11 April 2022.

== Today ==
According to the Welsh Index of Multiple Deprivation, the Queensway ward of Caia Park community is one of the 100 most deprived areas in Wales (the 5 wards that make up Caia Park community are Cartrefle, Queensway, Smithfield, Whitegate and Wynnstay). The area was part of the Welsh Government's Communities First anti-poverty programme which was discontinued in March 2018.

Each ward has three community council members except Wynnstay which has two, in Caia Park Community Council. Caia Park Community Council was established in 1985. The Council runs an advice service, a community venue at St Peter's Hall, and funds environmental projects, in addition to the usual community council powers over footpaths, lighting, and input on planning matters.

The area has a local football team, FC Queens Park, which plays in the Welsh National League (Wrexham Area).
