= Erbistock =

Village in Wales

Erbistock: Welsh: Erbistog
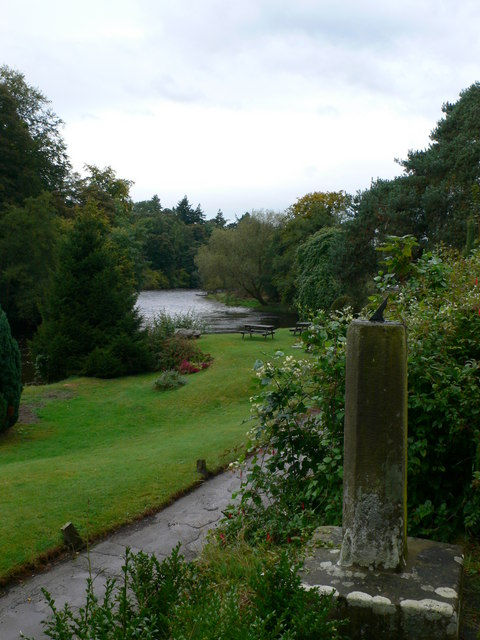
- The River Dee, seen from the churchyard of St. Hilary's church, Erbistock

- Location within Wrexham
- Population: 383 (2011 census)
- OS grid reference: SJ355414
- Community: Erbistock
- Principal area: Wrexham
- Preserved county: Clwyd
- Country: Wales
- Sovereign state: United Kingdom
- Post town: WREXHAM
- Postcode district: LL13
- Dialling code: 01978
- Police: North Wales
- Fire: North Wales
- Ambulance: Welsh
- UK Parliament: Wrexham
- Senedd Cymru – Welsh Parliament: Clwyd South
- List of places UK Wales Wrexham 52.966°N 2.960°W Map of the community

Erbistock (Welsh: Erbistog) is a village and community in Wrexham County Borough, Wales. The village lies on the banks of the River Dee.

The community area, governed by Erbistock Community Council (Welsh: Cyngor Cymuned Erbistog) also includes the small villages of Crabtree Green and Eyton; it had a total population of 409 at the 2001 census, falling to 383 at the 2011 Census.

== History ==
Erbistock was one of the ancient townships of the Lordship of Bromfield. In 1086 it was mentioned in the Domesday Book as a small settlement lying within the hundred of Exestan and in the county of Cheshire. It later became one of the parishes of Denbighshire but a part lay in the detached part of Flintshire known as the Maelor Saesneg, the Denbighshire portion having been attached to the Maelor Gymraeg. The Wrexham historian Alfred Neobard Palmer noted that this division was very old, and resulted from the desire of Edward I of England to strengthen English influence in the border borough of Overton. In April 1300 a writ was issued to Richard de Massey, the justice of Chester, to bargain with "certain Welshmen" holding lands in Overton with the offer of exchanging them with parts of the king's demesne lands in Erbistock.

A parish church dedicated to Saint Erbin was mentioned as far back as the 13th century but the present church, dedicated to Saint Hilary, was constructed in 1860. Palmer suggested that the name derives from "Erbin's stoke" meaning Erbin's stockaded ford.

The corresponding civil parish of Erbistock absorbed the neighbouring parish of Eyton in 1935. According to Palmer, Eyton was mentioned as early as 1043, when it was given by Leofric, earl of Mercia, to the minster he had founded at Coventry, and at the time of the Domesday Book survey was held by the bishop of Lichfield.

The village and its picturesque surrounding area have been defined as the Erbistock Village and Conservation Area by Wrexham county borough council.

== Important buildings ==
Erbistock has two popular pubs. The Cross Foxes at Overton Bridge, dating back to 1748, was built by the Wynnstay Estate for its workers. The famous 17th century Boat Inn stands beside the River Dee. The inn takes its name from the hand-operated chain ferry which once crossed the river at this point, with remnants of the pull mechanism still existing nearby.

On the riverbank next to the Boat is the Grade II listed St. Hilary's Church. It was built in 1860, replacing a Georgian structure which had itself replaced an earlier timber-framed and thatched building, and was funded by Caroline Boates of Rose Hill and her daughter. Members of the Boates family also contributed the elaborate stained glass windows; the church contains an 18th-century chandelier and a font bowl that may be Norman in origin. The Churchyard Extension contains the war graves of a Royal Navy officer and an officer and noncommissioned officer of the army from the Second World War.

Erbistock Hall is a grade II listed Georgian country house which stands on rising ground overlooking the River Dee. The house was built in 1770 and belonged to the Wynn family of Wynnstay. Originally built in brick in three storeys, it was later reduced to two. It has a notable topiary garden. The house was acquired by Sir Charles Lowther, 4th Baronet circa 1930. It was also owned at one time by the Brancker family.

== Notable people ==
- St. Richard Gwyn – (1535–1584), Welsh schoolmaster during the Elizabethan era, composer of Welsh poetry, one of the Forty Martyrs of England and Wales, and Patron Saint of the Roman Catholic Diocese of Wrexham. While living in Erbistock with his family, Gwyn secretly set up the Welsh equivalent to an Irish hedge school inside a deserted barn, where he secretly taught the children of local Catholic families.

== Bibliography ==
Alfred Neobard Palmer, "A History of Ancient Tenures of Land in North Wales and the Marches" (1910)
