= Isycoed =

Village and community in Wrexham County Borough, Wales

Coordinates: 53.04573°N 2.8924°W

- Village and community
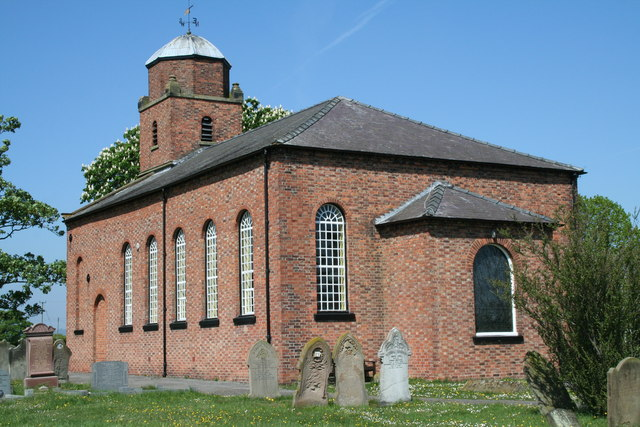
- St. Paul's Church at Isycoed

- Location within Wrexham
- Principal area: Wrexham
- Country: Wales
- Sovereign state: United Kingdom
- Police: North Wales
- Fire: North Wales
- Ambulance: Welsh
- List of places UK Wales Wrexham Map of the community

Isycoed (Welsh: Is-y-coed) is a village and community in Wrexham County Borough, Wales. It lies around 5 miles to the east of Wrexham, close to the River Dee on the border with England.

There is a primary school in Bowling Bank, and a late-Georgian church, dedicated to St. Paul, in Isycoed village, which was designated as a Grade II listed building on 20 June 1996.

It was the location of the 2025 Wrexham National Eisteddfod.

== Governance ==
The area was traditionally considered part of the parish of Holt, but was made a separate parish in 1827, incorporating the townships of Cacca Dutton, Dutton Diffaeth, Dutton y Bran, Ridley, and Sutton. The civil parish, established in 1935, was replaced by the Community of Isycoed under the Local Government Act 1972.

The community today contains the village of the same name, and the hamlets of Bowling Bank, and Ridleywood; part of the Wrexham Industrial Estate occupies the western side of the community area. At the time of the 2001 census, the population was 348, increasing to 388 at the 2011 Census.

== St Paul's Church ==
The first church on this site was built in 1718 and it was replaced by another building in 1742. The present church was built in 1829 and is dedicated to St Paul. It is built of brown brick with light headers to give a chequer-board effect. The side door and the adjacent windows have been blocked up. The medium-height tower is at the west end, the top stage is octagonal with a leaded roof and it is surmounted by a weather vane. The church was designated as a Grade II listed building on 20 June 1996, assessed as being "a good example of an earlier C19 church".
