= St Mary's Church, Ruabon =

Church in Wrexham County Borough, Wales

St Mary's Church
- Church of St Mary, Ruabon
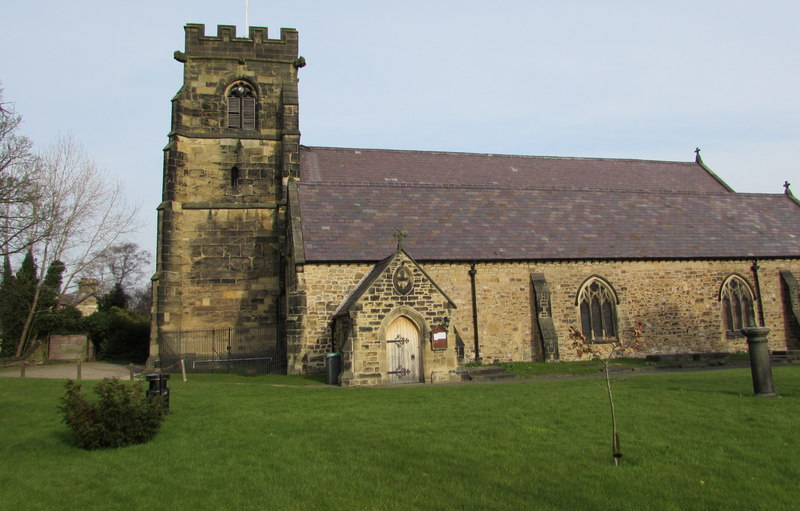

- Location in Wrexham
- 52°59′13″N 3°2′24″W
- Country: Wales
- Denomination: Church in Wales

History
- Dedication: St Mary

Architecture
- Heritage designation: Grade I
- Architectural type: Church

St Mary's is a Grade I listed church in Ruabon, Wrexham County Borough, Wales. It is situated in the church yard between Bridge Street and Church Street. Included in the listing is the lych gate and churchyard walls. The church is listed on the National Monuments Record of Wales. The parish is in the Mission Area of Offa in the Church in Wales Diocese of St Asaph.

== History ==
The ancient parish of Ruabon was changed numerous times over the centuries and most recently became the new parish of Penycae. The church was recorded in 1253, dedicated to St Collen. The tower and some other parts are 14th century, and a chapel was added in 1769 when the church was remodelled. The church was substantially rebuilt in the 19th century.

== Exterior ==
The church, at least as early as the 13th century, is constructed of sandstone rubble and ashlar under a slate roof. The tower is 14th century, and has windows, buttresses and bell openings, and an internal stair tower. There is some evidence remaining of the 13th century building, but most windows are 19th century.

== Interior ==
The nave and its timber roof are largely 19th century, but there are remnants of the 16th-century construction, and some 15th-century wall paintings were recovered in 1870. The pulpit and walls are 19th century. There are tombs dating from the 15th century, and a number of efigies and sarcophogi. The windows have stained glass of unknown date.

== See also ==
- Grade I listed buildings in Wrexham County Borough
