= St Chad's Church, Holt =

Coordinates: 53.0809°N 2.8791°W

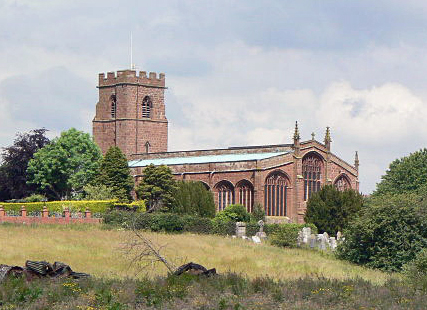
- St Chad's Church, Holt
- OS grid reference: SJ 412,541
- Location: Holt, Wrexham County Borough
- Country: Wales
- Denomination: Anglican

History
- Status: Parish church
- Dedication: St Chad

Architecture
- Functional status: Active
- Heritage designation: Grade I
- Architect(s): Ewan Christian, John Douglas
- Architectural type: Church
- Style: Gothic
- Groundbreaking: 13th century (?)
- Completed: 1873

Specifications
- Materials: Red sandstone

Administration
- Province: Church in Wales
- Diocese: St Asaph
- Archdeaconry: Wrexham
- Deanery: Gresford
- Parish: Holt

Clergy
- Vicar: Revd Canon Tudor Hughes

St Chad's Church, Holt, is in the village of Holt, Wrexham County Borough, Wales overlooking the River Dee and the Wales–England border. It is an active Anglican church in the deanery of Alyn, the archdeaconry of Wrexham and the diocese of St Asaph. The church is designated by Cadw as a Grade I listed building.

== History ==
The earliest documentary reference to the church is in 1379 but it is thought that it was established around the 1280s. Additions were made to the church and it was remodelled in the late 15th century under the patronage of Sir William Stanley. During the Civil War it was damaged when it was occupied by Parliamentary forces; bullet marks are still present from that occupation. In 1732 the church was renovated; this included removal of the rood loft and screens.

A further restoration was carried out between 1871 and 1873 on behalf of the Ecclesiastical Commissioners. Ewan Christian carried out the work on the chancel and John Douglas was responsible for the rest of the church. This included removal of the whitewash from the interior and adding vaulting under the tower. New oak screens were fitted between the chancel and the chapels, and the seating was replaced in the choir and the nave. Many memorials were removed and the window tracery was renewed.

The bells were rehung in 1896, a weather vane was added to the tower in 1897, and the clock by J. B. Joyce & Co was replaced in 1903. In 1960 the heating and lighting were improved and in 1963 restoration work was carried out on the tower and the roof were re-covered.

== Architecture ==
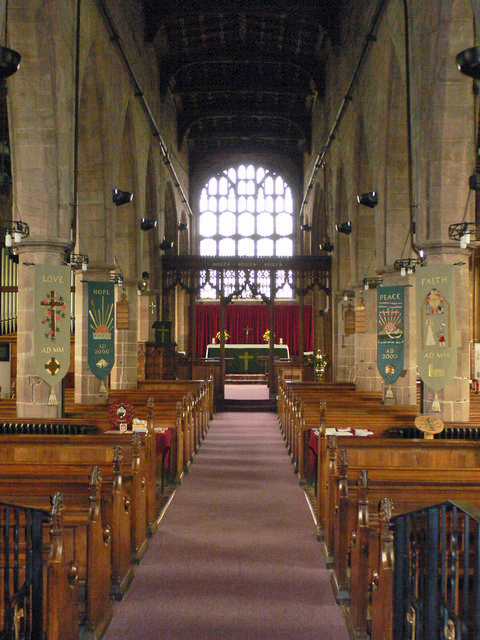
Interior of the church looking towards the chancel

=== Exterior ===
The church is built in red sandstone. Its plan consists of a five-bay nave without a clerestory, a two-bay chancel, north and south aisles (the south aisle is wider than the north), and a west tower. The west end of the south aisle is used as a baptistry and at the south end is a Lady Chapel. At the east end of the north aisle is the organ, beyond which is another chapel. The style of the nave arcades is Decorated, and the tower is also Decorated, but from a later date. Most of the rest of the church is Perpendicular in style. The tower has four stages with a battlemented parapet. The roof is flat with a weather vane on the north side and a flagpole in its centre. At the corners are gargoyles. On the southwest and northwest corners, and on the north side are buttresses; a stair turret is on the south side.

=== Interior ===
The font dates from about 1493. It is boldly carved and includes heraldry relating to the lordship of Bromfield. In the aisle to the south of the chancel is a Decorated piscina which has been moved from elsewhere. A memorial plate in the north chancel aisle is dated 1666. The two-manual organ is a 1910 Norman and Beard organ moved from a redundant church in the North of England which was rebuilt and installed in 1976. There is a ring of six bells which were all cast in the 18th century by Rudhall of Gloucester. There are obvious signs of Civil War combat within the church: the west wall is pitted with holes made by musket balls, and the north door is pierced by three plugged loopholes, made for firing musket rifles. The Crue memorial is a brass tablet commemorating Thomas Crue (d. 1666) with an acrostic on the deceased's name.

== External features ==
The churchyard contains the war graves of four British soldiers of World War I.

== See also ==
- List of church restorations, amendments and furniture by John Douglas
