= Wynnstay =

Estate near Wrexham

Wynnstay Hall
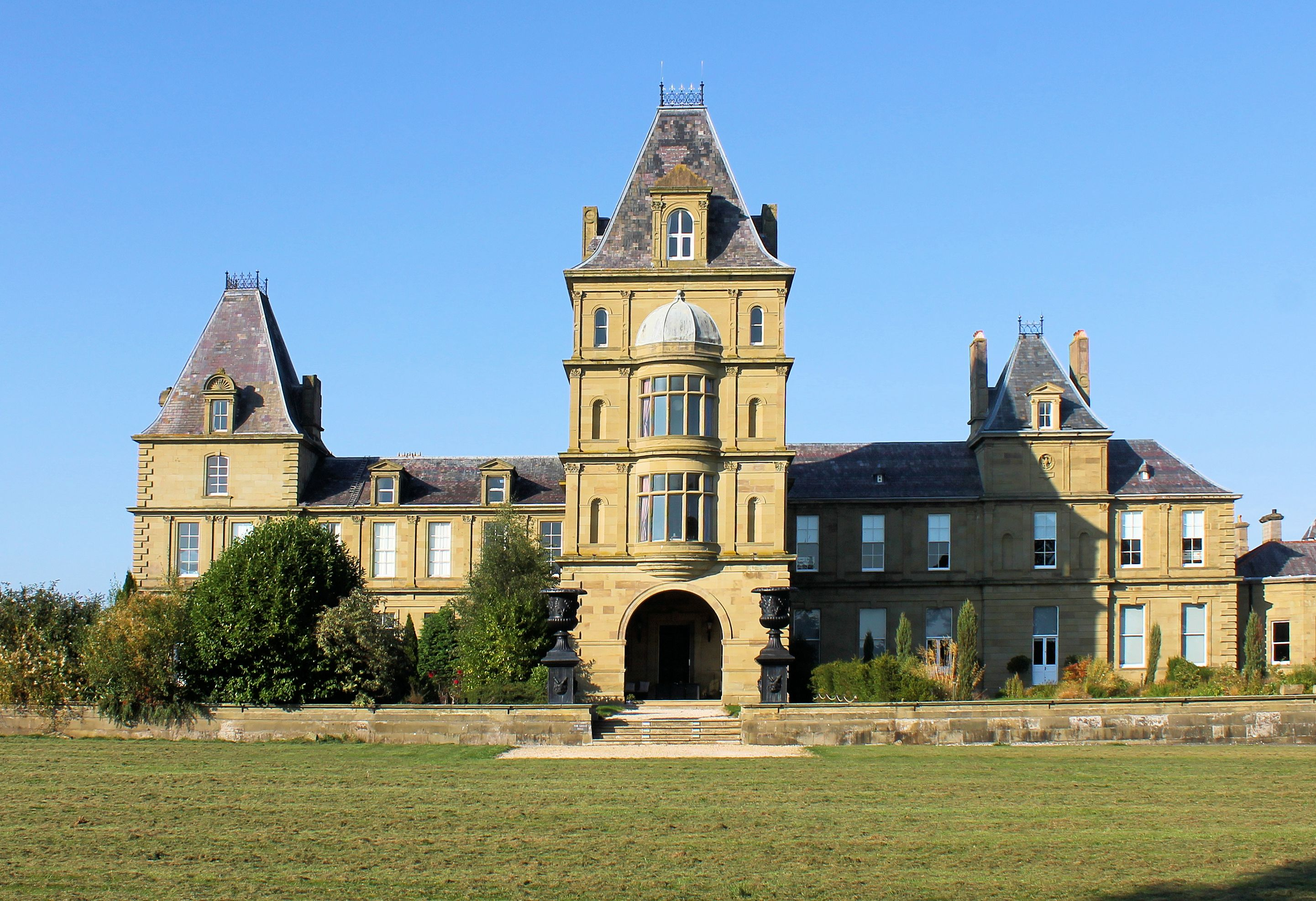

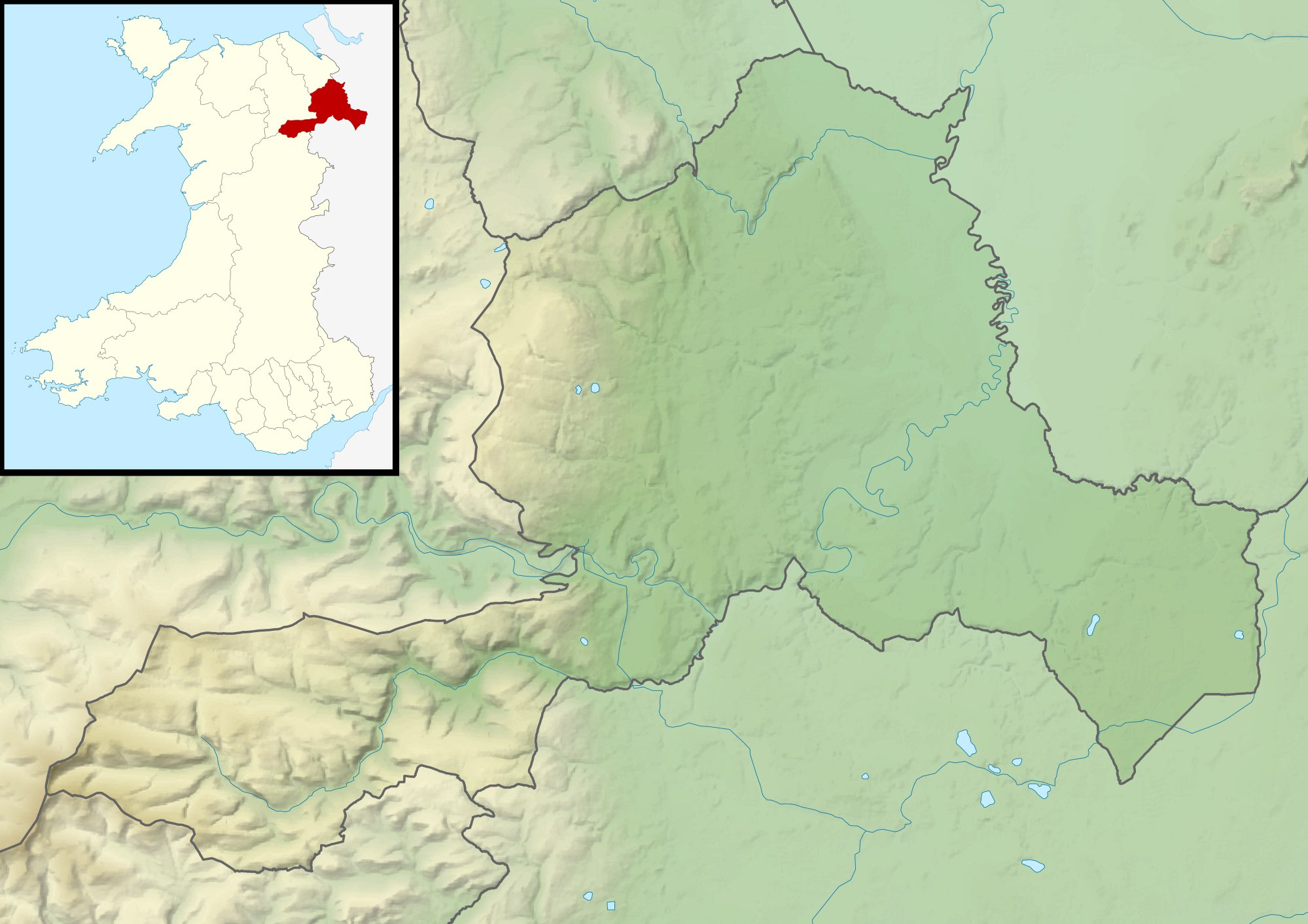
- Location within Wrexham
- 52.9763°N 3.0307°W
- Type: House
- Location: Ruabon, Wrexham

History
- Built: Mid 19th century with earlier origins

Site notes
- Architectural style: French Neo-Renaissance
- Governing body: private

Cadw/ICOMOS Register of Parks and Gardens of Special Historic Interest in Wales
- Official name: Wynnstay
- Designated: 1 February 2022; 4 years ago
- Reference no.: PGW(C)64(WRE)
- Listing: Grade I

Listed Building – Grade II*
- Official name: Wynnstay Hall
- Designated: 7 June 1963
- Reference no.: 1627

Listed Building – Grade II*
- Official name: Cascade
- Designated: 22 February 1995
- Reference no.: 15749

Listed Building – Grade II*
- Official name: Wynnstay Column
- Designated: 22 February 1995
- Reference no.: 15746

Listed Building – Grade II*
- Official name: Dairy at Wynnstay Hall
- Designated: 22 February 1995
- Reference no.: 15742

Listed Building – Grade II*
- Official name: Kennels (including valeting house and attached courtyard buildings and boundary walls)
- Designated: 22 February 1995
- Reference no.: 15723

Wynnstay is a country house within an important landscaped park 1.3 km (0.75 miles) south-east of Ruabon, near Wrexham, Wales. Wynnstay, previously Watstay, is a famous estate and the family seat of the Williams-Wynn baronets. The house was sold in 1948 and is under private ownership as of 2000. It has subsequently been subdivided into smaller residential units.

== History ==
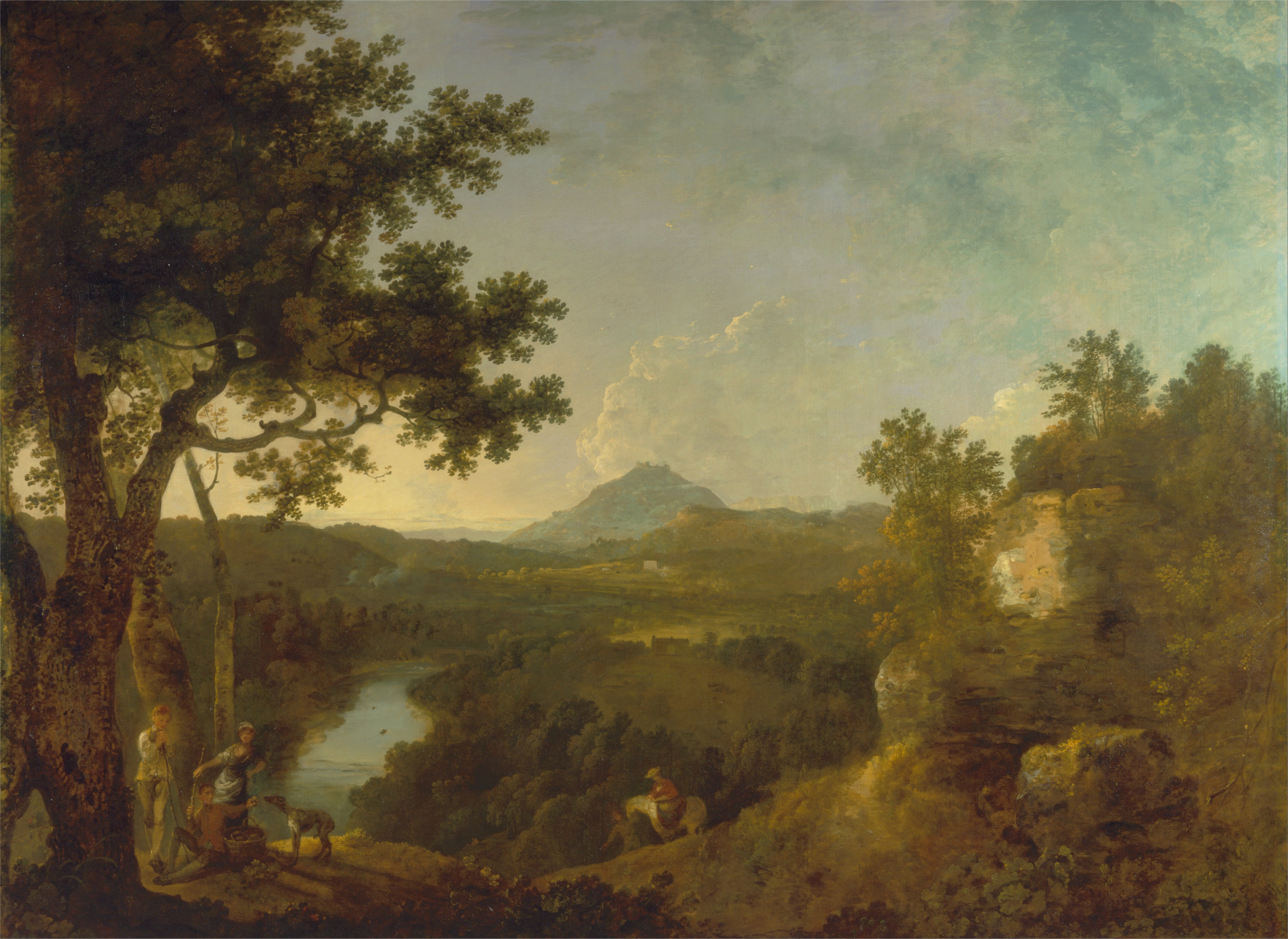
View near Wynnstay by Richard Wilson, 1771

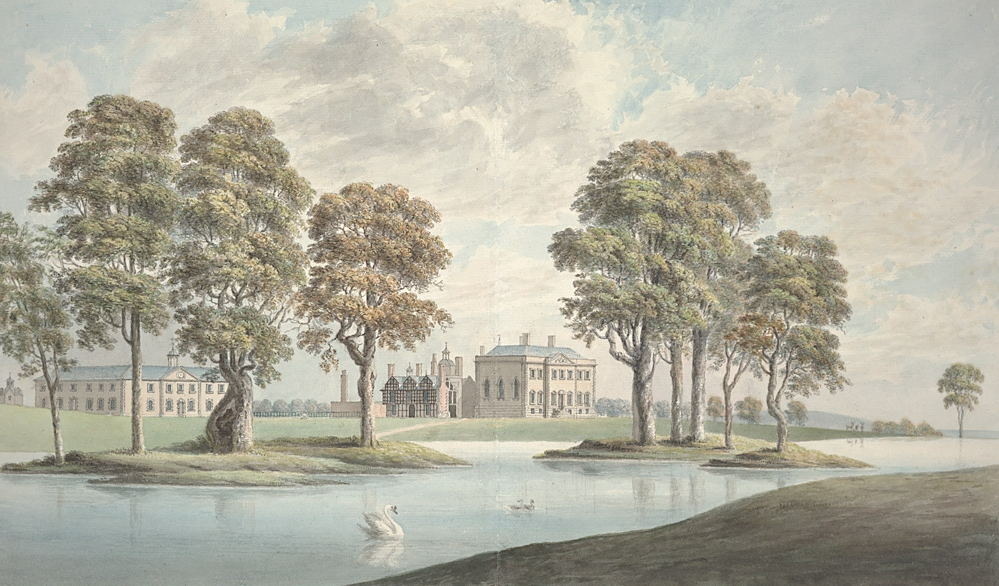
Wynnstay, 1793

During the 17th century, Sir John Wynn, 5th Baronet, inherited the Watstay Estate through his marriage to Jane Evans (daughter of Eyton Evans of Watstay), and renamed it the Wynnstay Estate. The gardens were laid out by Capability Brown. Wynnstay was Brown's largest commission in Wales, work beginning in 1774 and completed in 1784, a year after his death. He replaced the older formal gardens with lawns which swept right up to the house overlooking the lake.

Famous occupants of the house and estate included Sir Watkin Williams-Wynn, 4th Baronet. During the 19th century, Princess Victoria stayed there with her mother, the Duchess of Kent.

In 1858, Wynnstay was destroyed by fire and was rebuilt on the same site, with Benjamin Ferrey as architect.

After the house was vacated by the Williams-Wynn family in the mid-20th century, in favour of the nearby Plas Belan on the Wynnstay estate, it was bought by Lindisfarne College. When the school closed due to bankruptcy, the building was converted to flats and several private houses.

== Historic listing designations ==
Wynnstay is a Grade II* listed building. The gardens underwent a process of refurbishment which was completed by 2016 and are listed at Grade I on the Cadw/ICOMOS Register of Parks and Gardens of Special Historic Interest in Wales.

Other structures listed at Grade II* include the Cascade, the Wynnstay Column commemorating Sir Watkin Williams-Wynn, 4th Baronet, the dairy, and the kennels.

Structures listed at Grade II include a range of garden features: a plunge pool, a boathouse, an ice house, a sluice, an ha-ha a tunnel from the kitchen garden, and the walls of an earlier kitchen garden. There are also a number of ancillary buildings designed to support the estate including: the estate office and cottage, the stables, the chapel, a game larder, and school room and attached master's house. Lastly, five lodges stand at the entrances to the estate: the West and East Broth Lodges, the Bakers Lodge, the School Lodge, and the Park Lodge.

== See also ==
- Wynnstay Arms Hotel, Ruabon
- Wynnstay Arms Hotel, Wrexham
