= Llangollen Rural =

Community in Wrexham County Borough, Wales

- Community
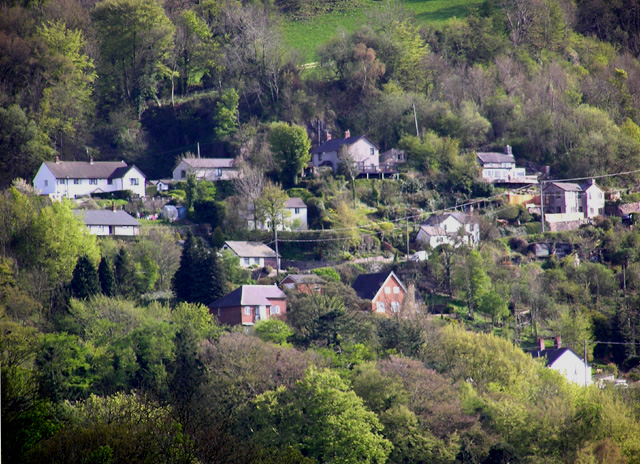
- View of the village of Froncysyllte, in Llangollen Rural

- Location within Wrexham
- Population: 1,994 (Community, 2021)
- Principal area: Wrexham
- Country: Wales
- Sovereign state: United Kingdom
- Police: North Wales
- Fire: North Wales
- Ambulance: Welsh
- List of places UK Wales Wrexham 52°58′16″N 3°06′01″W

Llangollen Rural (Welsh: Llangollen Wledig) is a community and electoral ward in Wrexham County Borough, Wales. It contains the villages of Froncysyllte, Garth, and Trevor, and had a population of 1,999 at the 2001 census, 2,059 at the 2011 Census and 1,994 at the 2021 census. The Pontcysyllte aqueduct is a World Heritage Site. Although named Rural, it is actually relatively densely populated.

== History ==
The area historically formed part of the ancient parish of Llangollen in Denbighshire. The central part of the parish around the town itself was administered as a local board district from 1857. Such districts were converted into urban districts under the Local Government Act 1894, which also directed that civil parishes could no longer straddle district boundaries. The parish of Llangollen was therefore reduced to match the urban district, and the remainder of the old parish was made a new parish called Llangollen Rural.

The parish was converted into a community in 1974 under the Local Government Act 1972, which also saw it transferred into the new county of Clwyd. When the latter was abolished in 1996, Llangollen Rural was initially included in the new county of Denbighshire, but was transferred to Wrexham County Borough in 1997, save for some areas which were transferred to the neighbouring community of Llangollen.

== Governance ==
The community elects or co-opts 10 community councillors to Llangollen Rural Community Council, at the lowest level of local government.
