= Grade II listed buildings in Wrexham County Borough =

Wrexham County Borough shown within Wales

In the United Kingdom, the term listed building refers to a building or other structure officially designated as being of special architectural, historical, or cultural significance; Grade II structures are those considered to be "buildings of special interest which justify every effort being made to preserve them". Listing was begun by a provision in the Town and Country Planning Act 1947. Once listed, strict limitations are imposed on the modifications allowed to a building's structure or fittings. In Wales, the authority for listing under the Planning (Listed Buildings and Conservation Areas) Act 1990 rests with Cadw.

This is a list of Grade II listed buildings in Wrexham County Borough. There are 946 Grade II listed buildings in the county borough.

== Abenbury ==
Map of the community.

This is a list of the seven Grade II listed buildings in the community of Abenbury, in Wrexham County Borough.

Name	Location Grid Ref. (Note: Sometimes known as OSGB36, the grid reference is based on the British national grid reference system used by the Ordnance Survey.) Geo-coordinates	Date Listed	Type	Notes	Reference Number	Image
Cefn Park (including attached stableyard range to N)	Abenbury; SJ3568549716; 53.04083°N 2.9606864°W	7 June 1963	Country house	Early/mid 18th century Georgian mansion or country house. Three-storey structure made of rendered brick with stone dressings exposed.	1551	
Cefn Park Lodge	Abenbury; SJ3546250184; 53.04501°N 2.9641057°W	12 September 1996	Lodge	Mid to late 19th-century gate lodge to the Cefn Park estate. Two-storey in Neo-Classical and red brick. It has stone dressings, a slate roof, and a brick chimney stack.	17273	
Erlas Hall	Abenbury; SJ3729250765; 53.05045°N 2.9369266°W	9 August 2005	Country house	Mid-19th century two-storey building. The exterior of largely brick with a slate roof, featuring Flemish Bond brickwork. Former centre of Erlas estate, later part of the Gredington estate in 1836.	84802	–
Gates and gate-piers at Cefn Park Lodge	Abenbury; SJ3544950185; 53.045017°N 2.9642998°W	12 September 1996	Gates	Mid to late 19th-century twin stone piers supporting decorative double wrought-iron gates. Constructed alongside Cefn Park Lodge.	17274	
Ice-house to NW of Llwyn Onn Hall Hotel	Abenbury; SJ3580349408; 53.038076°N 2.9588653°W	12 September 1996	Ice-house	Late 18th or 19th-century red brick ice-house with a barrel-vaulted entrance leading to a submerged rectangular ice-chamber. It is associated with Llwyn Onn Hall.	17275	–
Llwyn Onn Hall Hotel	Abenbury; SJ3587849371; 53.037753°N 2.9577396°W	7 June 1963	Country house	Late 17th or early 18th-century gentry house, with cement-rendered brick, is of three storeys and has a slate roof. Converted into a hotel in 1986.	1553	
Pavilion including attached Skittle Alley at Cefn Park	Abenbury; SJ3570449599; 53.039781°N 2.9603797°W	12 September 1996	Pavilion	A single-storey, rendered brick octagonal pavilion with an attached Skittle alley, that is a brick-sided open trough on the west side of the pavilion. They were built in the late 18th and early 19th centuries in the grounds of Cefn Park.	17272	–

== Bangor-on-Dee ==
Map of the community.

This is a list of the seven Grade II listed buildings in the community of Bangor-on-Dee, in Wrexham County Borough.

Name	Location Grid Ref. Geo-coordinates	Date Listed	Type	Notes	Reference Number	Image
Althrey Woodhouse Barn	Bangor is-y-Coed; SJ3826843964; 52.989436°N 2.9210656°W	24 February 1997	Barn	Large well-preserved, probably 17th century, timber-frame barn, with brick nogging (possibly secondary), a sheeted metal roof, and on the western side brick plinth. A roof covering and a false ceiling were added in the late 20th century.	18260	
Brynhovah Cottage	Bangor is-y-Coed; SJ3853443378; 52.9842°N 2.9169919°W	24 February 1997	Cottage	An 18th-century two-storey house, possibly a smallholder's house, with a byre under the same continuous roofline. The exterior is of red brick in an irregular bond, including brick chimneys, as well as a slate roof. The building was altered in the late 19th century.	18261	–
Graig Cottage	Bangor is-y-Coed; SJ3952345767; 53.005785°N 2.9027105°W	24 February 1997	Cottage	A possibly late 18th-century, two-storey building, externally in brick in an English garden-wall bond, with a hipped slate roof with red ridge tiles. Some alterations were made in the 20th century.	18259	–
Hole in the Wall	Bangor is-y-Coed; SJ3889044911; 52.998019°N 2.9119803°W	27 November 2013	Residence	1970s modernist style house, to the designs of architect J.B. Davies, for his personal use. It is set within landscaped grounds, Internally divided into two parks, an open-plan living room and a small snug room. Its name refers to a hole created in an Overton Road brick wall, created during construction.	87668	–
Old Bridge House	Bangor is-y-Coed; SJ3885845474; 53.003076°N 2.9125638°W	24 February 1997	Residence	The building was built in c. 1864, with a shop front added later in the 19th century, while further interior alterations were done in the 20th century. Exterior of red brick in a Flemish bond, with brick chimneys, brick plinth, and a hipped slate roof.	18258	
The Stableyard	Bangor is-y-Coed; SJ3895045491; 53.003239°N 2.9111962°W	16 November 1962	Hotel	The building may date to possibly the early 17th century, and possibly originated as a two-unit house, and may have initially been a coaching inn, but now a small hotel. It had alterations and extensions added in the 18th and 19th centuries. It is largely two-storey but with some one-storey extensions. Its exterior is of painted and rendered brick, with brick nogging in timber framing, brick and rendered brick chimneys and a slate roof.	1646	–
War Memorial	Bangor is-y-Coed; SJ3882945438; 53.002749°N 2.912989°W	24 February 1997	Memorial	A red sandstone column, topped with a female Art Nouveau female figure holding two wreaths. Built and possibly designed by H. Tyson Smith in 1922, as a memorial to the First World War. 1939 and 1945 dates were later added to commemorate the Second World War.	18257	

== Brymbo ==
Map of the community.

This is a list of the four Grade II listed buildings in the community of Brymbo, in Wrexham County Borough.

Name	Location Grid Ref. Geo-coordinates	Date Listed	Type	Notes	Reference Number	Image
Church of Saint Mary	Brymbo; SJ2950754308; 53.081321°N 3.0538199°W	1 December 1995	Church	1871–2 church designed by T H Wyatt and built by J Roberts of Chester, in an Early English style. Its exterior is made of rock-faced stone, and it has a slate roof.	13389	
Pentre Saeson Foundry Building	Brymbo; SJ2785253195; 53.071097°N 3.0782721°W	9 October 1978	Foundry	Late 18th-century foundry, established by John Wilkinson, as part of the Brymbo Hall estate. Made of roughly coursed rubble. Was in use until 1981.	1718	–
Stone Chimney at Pentre Saeson Foundry	Brymbo; SJ2785853181; 53.070972°N 3.0781794°W	9 October 1978	Chimney	Late 18th-century tall circular foundry chimney, made of stone rubble in large blocks, capped with brick.	1717	–
The Bottle Chimney	Brymbo; SJ2849553837; 53.076953°N 3.06882°W	1 December 1995	Chimney	30-metre (98 ft) circular structure in roughly coursed rubble. Used until the 1880s as part of lead smelting works, and later for carbon manufacturing. Also known as the "Brymbo Bottle", used to collect lead sublimate during smelting. Partially demolished in 1962, from the original 30 metres (98 ft) to 6 metres (20 ft) in height today. Only surviving structure of its kind in Wales.	13484	

== Caia Park ==
Map of the community.

This is a list of the eight Grade II listed buildings in the community of Caia Park, in Wrexham County Borough.

Name	Location Grid Ref. Geo-coordinates	Date Listed	Type	Notes	Reference Number	Image
Kingsmills Bridge over River Clywedog	Caia Park; SJ3472449163; 53.035743°N 2.974905°W	16 June 1980	Bridge	A Yellow single-arched sandstone bridge made by mason Robert Jones in 1782. Nearby is a small coursed stone bridge across the River Gwenfro.	1757	–
No 20, Charles Street (S side), Clwyd	Caia Park; SJ3369850251; 53.045396°N 2.9904273°W	31 January 1994	Building	Part of a terrace of four late 19th-century shops, with accommodation, which was likely adapted from a 17th-century timber-framed building. Its exterior front is of brick and surviving timber framing.	1756	–
No 21, Charles Street, Clwyd	Caia Park; SJ3369650246; 53.04535°N 2.9904561°W	31 January 1994	Building	Part of a terrace of four late 19th-century shops, with accommodation, which was likely adapted from a 17th-century timber-framed building. Its exterior front is of brick and surviving timber framing in internal walls and the roof.	16472	–
No 22, Charles Street, Clwyd	Caia Park; SJ3368950247; 53.045359°N 2.9905607°W	31 January 1994	Building	Part of a terrace of four late 19th-century shops, with accommodation, which was likely adapted from a 17th-century timber-framed building. Its exterior front is of brick and surviving timber framing in internal walls and the roof.	16473	
No 23, Charles Street, Clwyd	Caia Park; SJ3368450246; 53.045349°N 2.9906351°W	31 January 1994	Building	Part of a terrace of four late 19th-century shops, with accommodation, which was likely adapted from a 17th-century timber-framed building. Its exterior front is of brick and surviving timber framing in internal walls and the roof.	16474	
The Feathers Public House	Caia Park; SJ3363750257; 53.045442°N 2.9913383°W	31 January 1994	Former pub	A c. 1850 – c. 1860 former public house and coaching inn made of two properties, both two-storey and with central entrances, along Chester Street. Its exterior is rendered over brick, with a slate roof. Features of a stable and coach house exist at the rear.	1829	
The Red Lion Public House	Caia Park; SJ3476949171; 53.035821°N 2.9742356°W	31 January 1994	Pub	17th-century building, initially built as a dwelling, later a public house. Its exterior is rendered over a brick or possibly timber framing, with a slate roof containing red tiled cresting. It is one and a half storeys, with a three-unit plan.	1755	–
Wynnstay Arms Hotel	Caia Park; SJ3364950232; 53.045219°N 2.9911542°W	30 May 1951	Hotel	First recorded as being the site of an inn in 1702, but rebuilt in ~1780 with the construction of a three-storey section on the corner of Charles Street, now serving as the oldest part of the building. Extended in the early 19th century, with the original 18th and 19th century façade surviving, while the remaining parts of the building were demolished and rebuilt in the 1970s. It has a cast iron balcony on its first floor.	1759	

== Cefn ==
Map of the community.

This is a list of the five Grade II listed buildings in the community of Cefn, in Wrexham County Borough.

Name	Location Grid Ref. Geo-coordinates	Date Listed	Type	Notes	Reference Number	Image
Cefn Bychan Baptist Chapel	Cefn; SJ2847241503; 52.966098°N 3.0664252°W	30 April 1996	Chapel	Early 19th-century chapel, dated to 1825, with a fine vernacular character. Its exterior is roughly coursed with a squared rubble construction and a half-hipped slate roof and brick chimney. It has a doorway at the centre, with an inscribed stone above bearing the date.	16871	
Cefn Kynaston including garden walls	Cefn; SJ2791742186; 52.972162°N 3.0748393°W	30 April 1996	Residence	Early 19th century house, likely from c. 1820 – c. 1830, with the rear extended in the late 19th century. Its exterior is of a coursed and squared rubble construction, with a hipped slate roof. It is two-storeys. Its interior is largely intact from the original plan, with a central entrance hall and principal rooms which face the garden. Between 1897–c. 1960, it was the residence of local doctors.	16870	–
Church of St John	Cefn; SJ2838942787; 52.977627°N 3.0679453°W	20 April 1998	Church	1836–37 Gothic parish church, to the designs of Edward Welch and funded by Watkin Williams-Wynn. Its Gothic design is typical of churches funded by the Parliamentary Commission.	19677	–
Plas Kynaston	Cefn; SJ2804542143; 52.971792°N 3.0729241°W	7 June 1963	Residence	Early 18th-century house, with later detailing added, including substantial remodelling in the early 19th century. Its exterior is a rendering over stone, with brick rear wall stacks and a slate roof. It is of two storeys, with a central entrance in a doorcase. Was initially a house, later a library for a short period, and not fully occupied by 1996.	1576	–
Waterloo Tower including outwork walls	Cefn; SJ2847941854; 52.969253°N 3.0663987°W	30 April 1996	Tower	Gothic style c. 1815 – c. 1820 tower, built by Watkin Williams-Wynn, as a commemoration of the battle of Waterloo, and within Wynnstay. It is of a random rubble construction and has a square base. Its interior retains some of its original decorative work. It was designed as a viewing point and lodge, and the design is attributed to Wrexham architect Benjamin Gummow.	16874	

== Isycoed ==
Map of the community.

This is a list of the five Grade II listed buildings in the community of Isycoed, in Wrexham County Borough.

Name	Location Grid Ref. Geo-coordinates	Date Listed	Type	Notes	Reference Number	Image
Chapel House Farm House	Isycoed; SJ4020950104; 53.044843°N 2.8932939°W	7 June 1963	Residence	15th or 16th-century possible cruck house, with the walls and roof raised and a range added later in possibly the late 18th or early 19th centuries. It comprises a sub-medieval cruck-framed dwelling, which is now part of a cross-wing with a late 18th or early 19th-century brick and timber-framed house. Its exterior contains brick, timber framing, a slate roof partially removed, and brick chimneys. The building is arranged in a L-shaped plan and has two storeys.	1597	–
Church of St Paul	Isycoed; SJ4040450102; 53.044847°N 2.8903853°W	20 June 1996	Church	Early 19th-century church in a simple late Georgian style, constructed in 1829 to the designs of John Butler, replacing an older 1715 (rebuilt 1742) church on the site. Its exterior is of brown brick in a Flemish-bond, and as a slate roof which is hipped at its east. The building has a rectangular plan and a tower on the western end.	17815	
Cobham Cottage	Isycoed; SJ4063850256; 53.046258°N 2.8869239°W	23 March 1995	Residence	Possibly 17th century built, the house was partially reconstructed in brick in possibly the 18th century, with later alterations done in the 19th and 20th centuries. Its exterior is of a rendering over brick and timber framing. It has a stone plinth, a rendered chimney and a slate roof. It is one storey, with an attic, central entrance, and two rooms.	15912	–
Pear Tree House	Isycoed; SJ4042948105; 53.026901°N 2.8896428°W	20 June 1996	Residence	Mid-19th century smallholders house, with later 20th century alterations and additions. Its exterior is of brownish-red brick, although whitewashed on the front elevation, and has a slate roof with rendered chimneys. It is two storeys tall, and its interior plan is largely the same as originally built, with some early 20th-century refurbishments.	17816	–
Plough Inn PH	Isycoed; SJ4048250078; 53.04464°N 2.8892176°W	7 June 1963	Residence	Originally a 15/16th-century two-bay cruck-framed house, it was significantly remodelled in the 17th century. The remodelling added a new floor to the building, raising its roof and walls, with the attached outbuilding possibly added during this time. The building is one storey tall with an attic. The building's exterior now largely represents the building after it was majorly altered and added to in the late 19th and 20th centuries. The exterior shows brick, render, timber framing and mock timber framing, while it has a slate roof and rendered chimneys.	1598	

== Llay ==
Map of the community.

This is a list of the six Grade II listed buildings in the community of Llay, in Wrexham County Borough.

Name	Location Grid Ref. Geo-coordinates	Date Listed	Type	Notes	Reference Number	Image
Bryn Alyn Farmhouse	Llay; SJ3332754304; 53.081777°N 2.9968012°W	3 June 1996	Residence	Early 19th-century farmhouse, possibly as a home farm to Bryn Alyn House. Its exterior is of red brick in an English garden-wall bond, with a hipped slate roof and brick chimneys. It is of a rectangular plan, with a central entrance and two storeys high.	17707	
Llay Hall Farm	Llay; SJ3262355688; 53.094127°N 3.0075999°W	9 June 1952	Residence	15th or 16th-century two-bay cruck-framed house. Remodelled in the 17th century with a new floor added, and the raising of the roof and walls It was also altered in the 19th and 20th centuries. Its exterior is of pebble-dashed stone with timber framing as well as a slate roof.	1544	
Llay Miners Welfare Institute	Llay; SJ3289655987; 53.096849°N 3.0035864°W	7 August 1990	Building	1929–1931 Edwardian Baroque building to the designs of Mold architect F. A. Roberts. It is two storeys, with its exterior of painted pebbledash, and a green slate, partly hipped, roof with chimney stacks. It is historically associated with the North Wales Coalfield.	1729	
Pavilion at Llay Miners Welfare Institute	Llay; SJ3286155912; 53.09617°N 3.0040933°W	7 August 1990	Building	1929–1931, likely built alongside the Miners Welfare Institute, in a simplified scaled-down Edwardian Baroque, and also by Mold architect F. A. Roberts. It is a single-storey, with a painted pebbledash exterior, and a hipped green slate roof. It is used as a bowling, cricket and rugby pavilion.	1730	–
Rackery Hall ( including attached forecourt walls)	Llay; SJ3231857118; 53.106941°N 3.0124555°W	7 June 1963	Building	Early 18th-century building, a remodelling of a possibly 17th-century house. It was also altered in the 19th and 20th centuries. The early 18th century remodelling introduced hand-made red brick in a Flemish-bond and English garden-wall bond to the building. It has a slate roof and red brick chimneys. Its interior retains many of its early 18th-century features, such as an oak well staircase. It is also known locally as "Apothecary Hall".	1613	–
U- shaped Farmyard Ranges at Llay Hall Farm	Llay; SJ3256355716; 53.094371°N 3.0085016°W	3 June 1996	Building	Mid 19th-century barns in a U-shape. They are two-storeys with a red brick exterior and slate roofs. The farmyard serves Llay Hall Farm and replaced timber-framed buildings from 1794.	17706	

== Pen-y-cae ==
Map of the community.

This is a list of the five Grade II listed buildings in the community of Pen-y-cae, in Wrexham County Borough.

Name	Location Grid Ref. Geo-coordinates	Date Listed	Type	Notes	Reference Number	Image
Church of St Thomas	Penycae; SJ2756345282; 52.999939°N 3.0808043°W	19 October 1999	Church	1877–78 church, designed by Aston Webb, in an Early English Gothic style. Its exterior is a polygonal rock-faced rubble, and it has a slate roof. It serves as a place of worship for a small community.	22503	
Former Apple Store at Wynn Hall	Penycae; SJ2905244755; 52.995403°N 3.0585056°W	15 January 1996	Storage	An underground building originally used for apple storage, possibly dating to the late 18th or early 19th centuries. It is a rubble structure with a vaulted roof, surmounted by a layer of soil (earth) that serves as insulation and is covered by a stone-flagged roof. It is situated below ground level, with its doorway facing a farm yard and the building is at the edge of a partially walled orchard. It is arranged as a single long chamber, with a tunnel-vaulted interior roof.	16847	–
Former Vicarage	Penycae; SJ2747845249; 52.999631°N 3.0820631°W	19 October 1999	Religious building	Late 19th-century Vicarage, built in 1892, is in a Vernacular Revival style. Its exterior is of brick with terracotta dressings, and it has a slate roof. Its interior layout is described as "well-planned", with principal rooms arranged to face the garden.	22504	–
Ty Brith	Penycae; SJ2771845333; 53.000419°N 3.0785065°W	15 January 1996	Residence	Possibly early 17th-century timber-framed Vernacular house, with its fenestration renewed in the early 19th century, while its timber-framing was covered in roughcast in c. 1910. It is box-framed with a brick nogging, covered in a roughcast render and in a picturesque cottage style, as well as having a slate roof. It is a three-unit layout with a central room.	16846	–
War Memorial	Penycae; SJ2805645240; 52.999629°N 3.0734503°W	15 January 1996	Memorial	White marble war memorial erected in c. 1920. It is a square section column positioned on a stepped base, which bears a statue of a soldier leaning on a rifle. Its column's shaped panels have leaded letters inscribed on them. It serves as a prominent feature of the village's centre.	17088	–

== Rhosllanerchrugog ==
Map of the community.

This is a list of the eight Grade II listed buildings in the community of Rhosllanerchrugog, in Wrexham County Borough.

Name	Location Grid Ref. Geo-coordinates	Date Listed	Type	Notes	Reference Number	Image
Bethlehem Independent Chapel	Rhosllanerchrugog; SJ2893346747; 53.01329°N 3.0607171°W	15 January 1996	Chapel	19th century chapel in a Rundbogenstil style. It has a datestone with 1812 inscribed, also it was possibly relocated. The building's main front was added in 1889, its organ dating to 1908, and its seating was renewed in c. 1926. It is a rough rubble and a wide structure. Its exterior is rock-faced stone, and the building has a clock tower. It is a prominent feature of Rhosllanerchrugog.	17090	
Capel Mawr (Jerusalem Welsh Presbyterian Chapel) with attached school room	Rhosllanerchrugog; SJ2907546280; 53.009112°N 3.0584982°W	15 January 1996	Chapel and school	Late 18th and early 19th-century chapel and school room. It was built in 1770, and enlarged in 1837. Its existing entrance front is from a later period, while an adjoining school room was added in c. 1900. Its exterior is of roughly coursed rubble, and has a slate roof with red tile cresting, while the school room's exterior is of brick. The school room and chapel are linked together by a hipped-roofed entrance block.	16845	
Church of Saint John Evangelist	Rhosllanerchrugog; SJ2925146029; 53.006879°N 3.0558206°W	15 January 1996	Church	19th century Romanesque Revival style church, built in 1852–53, to the designs of Thomas Penson. Its exterior is of coursed and squared stone, and it has a slate roof and a bell tower. It is arranged in a cruciform plan.	17089	
Eddystone House	Rhosllanerchrugog; SJ3010546695; 53.012977°N 3.0432401°W	15 January 1996	Residence	19th-century house, with its original form likely built in c. 1830, but it was restored and re-roofed in 1899, the latter date carried on its date-stone. Its exterior is of render, probably over brick, while it also has a slate roof. It serves as a residence.	17093	–
Llannerchrugog Hall	Rhosllanerchrugog; SJ2834047010; 53.015575°N 3.0696127°W	7 June 1963	Farmhouse	18th century gentry farmhouse, in the Georgian style. It is three storeys, and its exterior is of lined-out render over brick, as well as a slate roof. Originally a farm, in c. 1960 it was used as a nursing home.	1621	
Penuel Baptist Chapel	Rhosllanerchrugog; SJ2911746625; 53.012218°N 3.0579482°W	15 January 1996	Chapel	1859 Baptist Chapel, which was extensively renovated in 1891 by local builder Owain Morris Roberts. Its exterior is a combination of sandstone and brick, with some terracotta detailing.	17091	
War Memorial	Rhosllanerchrugog; SJ2954746273; 53.009111°N 3.0514634°W	15 January 1996	Memorial	c. 1920 war memorial commemorating initially the First World War, with additional tablets later added to commemorate the Second World War. The 1920 parts of the memorial are white marble and have a depiction of a soldier figure leaning on a rifle, situated on a stepped plinth pylon.	17092	–
War Memorial	Rhosllanerchrugog; SJ3009346362; 53.009983°N 3.0433468°W	15 January 1996	Memorial	White ashlar war memorial, built in probably c. 1920. It is a triangular pylon on a stepped base. It carries a figure depicting Saint Michael slaying a dragon. It has lettering on its base, with Second World War inscriptions on the pylon.	17094	–

== See also ==
- Grade I listed buildings in Wrexham County Borough
- Grade II* listed buildings in Wrexham County Borough
