= John Brass (colliery manager) =

Colliery manager who sat on the Gresford disaster inquiry

- Born: 1879; Wingate, County Durham
- Died: 2 December 1961; Leeds, Yorkshire, England
- Occupation: Mine manager
- Years active: 1900 –
- Known for: Gresford Colliery inquiry

John Brass was a manager and later director of Houghton Main Colliery Co Ltd. According to the Colliery Year Book and Coal Trades Directory he was "one of the most prominent figures in the South Yorkshire coal mining industry". He held significant posts in the mining, gas and coke industries both in South Yorkshire and nationally. Between 1934 and 1937 he was one of the assessors in the Gresford disaster inquiry and, along with the other assessor, published dissenting reports to the main inquiry.

== Background ==
Brass' father Thomas Francis Brass OBE, JP, MA(Durham) was born in 1858, the son of a blacksmith in Sherburn Hill, County Durham. TF Brass rose from colliery clerk through colliery cashier, to become a Surface Manager and eventually the Under Manager for Kimblesworth Colliery. By 1921 he was the agent (responsible for the general laying out and supervision of the workings) for Charlaw & Sacriston Collieries Co Ltd. In 1903 he was one of the team of rescuers who entered the flooded Sacriston pit. For this he was awarded the silver medal of the Royal Humane Society. TF Brass retired in 1934 and died in 1937.

== Early life ==
Brass was born 1879 in Wingate, County Durham. He was the eldest son of Thomas Francis Brass, the agent for Charlaw & Sacriston Collieries Co Ltd. Brass attended the Royal Grammar School, Newcastle upon Tyne. In 1894 he started work at Charlaw & Sacriston Collieries in County Durham. In 1902 he gained his Manager's certificate (number 2,098) and in 1903 became the manager or Primrose Colliery. In that year he was one of the rescuers who entered Sacriston Colliery along with his father. For this action he was awarded The Royal Humane Society's silver medal.<Royal Humane Society citation><Messrs. Spinks medal sale 19 November 2015> The Colliery Year Book and Coal Trades Directory for 1940 credits him with the medal, but the issues for 1933, 1945 and 1950 do not. The Mines Inspectors Report for 1903 states that: "six of the explorers; those selected being Mr. W. Walker, Inspector of Mines, Mr. W. C. Blackett, the Agent of the Colliery, Mr. S. Tate, the Agent for Messrs. Walter Scott, Ltd., Mr. T. F. Brass, Assistant Manager, and H. Blackburn and J. Hall, two Deputy-Overmen." By 1909 he was a member of the Institute of Mining Engineers.

== First World War ==
During the First World War he was Acting Major, 13th York and Lancaster Service Battalion. (Note: The battalion was known as the 1st Barnsley Pals. The battalion was formed in Barnsley on 17 September 1914. It moved to Silkstone in December 1914, to Penkridge Camp (Cannock Chase) in May 1914, to Ripon in July 1915 and to Salisbury plain in October 1915. In December 1915 the battalion moved to Egypt, and from there was sent to France in March 1916 where it took part on the first day of the Battle of the Somme.) Later in the war Brass was appointed Divisional Commander of Special Police for the Staincross Division of Yorkshire and became a Military Representative on Tribunals.

== Colliery Manager ==
In 1923 Brass was Director and General Manager of Houghton Main Colliery Co Ltd. Between 1923 and 1925 he was the President of the Midland Institute of Mining Engineers during which time he also became a member of the Institution of Civil Engineers. In 1929 Brass was a member of the committee which examined the issues surrounding the replacement of rail mounted tubs with conveyor belts.

In 1935 he was awarded the Medal of the Institution of Mining Engineers "in recognition of distinguished services to the mining profession and industry over a period of many years". He was also awarded the Peake Gold Medal by the Midland Institute of Mining Engineers.

== Gresford inquiry ==
On Saturday 22 September 1934 at 2:08 a.m. a violent explosion ripped through the Dennis section of Gresford Colliery. An inquiry into the Gresford disaster was ordered on 11 October 1934 and sat intermittently from 25 October 1934 to 13 December 1936. The report was laid before Parliament and debated on 23 February 1937. The inquiry sat with a commissioner and two assessors, one of whom was Brass. The outcome was unusual for all three men arrived at different conclusions with the assessors' reports being presented as appendices to the main report. The official finding, as presented by the commissioner Sir Henry Walker, viewed with suspicion shot firing activities. The other assessor, Mr Joseph Jones, was concerned about a possible firedamp build up on one of the faces which was ignited by an accident with a safety lamp or from a spark from a mechanised coalcutter. Brass however was concerned about the telephones which were not of an approved type. He surmised that the explosion could have been caused by a gas build on one of the main access tunnels which was ignited by the telephone being called.

== Bibliography ==
- anon (1947), The colliery year book and coal trades directory 1947., London: Louis Cassier Co. – via Durham Mining Museum
- Baker, Chris (2018), York & Lancaster Regiment – The Long, Long Trail
- DMM (30 September 2018), "John Brass", Durham Mining Museum
- DMM (30 November 2016), "Thomas Francis Brass", Durham Mining Museum
- Mine Inspectors Report (1903), "Awards for Gallantry", Durham Mining Museum
- Hansard (23 February 1937), House of Commons Debates, vol. 320, columns 1849-1966: House of Commons
- The Science & Art of Mining (27 July 1929), "Underground Conveying", Durham Mining Museum
- The Science & Art of Mining (23 November 1935), "Institution Medal Award", Durham Mining Museum
- Walker, Sir Henry, CBE LlD (Commissioner); Brass, John, MInstCE MIMinE (Assessor); Jones, Joseph, CBE JP (Assessor) (January 1937), Reports on the causes of and circumstances attending the explosion which occurred at Gresford Colliery, Denbigh on 22nd September, 1934 – via Durham Mining Museum
