= Grade II listed buildings in Gresford =

Map of the community in Wrexham County Borough.

In the United Kingdom, the term listed building refers to a building or other structure officially designated as being of special architectural, historical, or cultural significance; Grade II structures are those considered to be "buildings of special interest which justify every effort being made to preserve them". Listing was begun by a provision in the Town and Country Planning Act 1947. Once listed, strict limitations are imposed on the modifications allowed to a building's structure or fittings. In Wales, the authority for listing under the Planning (Listed Buildings and Conservation Areas) Act 1990 rests with Cadw.

This is a list of the 58 Grade II listed buildings in the community of Gresford, in Wrexham County Borough.

Name	Location Grid Ref. (Note: Sometimes known as OSGB36, the grid reference is based on the British national grid reference system used by the Ordnance Survey.) Geo-coordinates	Date Listed	Type/Function	Notes	Reference Number	Image
1 of a pair of Graves in the Graveyard to the E of All saints Church	Gresford; SJ3468654990; 53.08811°N 2.9766558°W	3 June 1996			17670	–
2 of a pair of Graves in the Graveyard to the E of All Saints Church	Gresford; SJ3468454992; 53.088128°N 2.976686°W	3 June 1996			17671	–
Achill	Gresford; SJ3461755021; 53.088381°N 2.9776922°W	7 June 1963	Domestic		17661	–
All Saints Primary School	Gresford; SJ3463154836; 53.08672°N 2.9774455°W	3 June 1996	Religious, Ritual and Funerary		17676	–
Allington Farm Gatehouse	Gresford; SJ3677555748; 53.095175°N 2.945619°W	3 June 1996	Education		17681	–
Allington Farmhouse	Gresford; SJ3675555749; 53.095182°N 2.9459178°W	3 June 1996	Domestic		17680	–
Base of Cross	Gresford; SJ3461954388; 53.082692°N 2.9775333°W	7 June 1963			1592	–
Beech Cottage	Gresford; SJ3599356322; 53.100241°N 2.9574098°W	2 July 1962	Transport		46	–
Beechmount	Gresford; SJ3595856228; 53.099392°N 2.9579136°W	2 July 1962	Domestic		10	–
Cedar House	Gresford; SJ3444655022; 53.088369°N 2.9802452°W	3 June 1996	Domestic		17674	–
Church House	Gresford; SJ3462955025; 53.088418°N 2.9775138°W	7 June 1963	Commercial		17660	–
Circular Privy at Green Farm	Gresford; SJ3459055056; 53.088692°N 2.9781024°W	3 June 1996	Religious, Ritual and Funerary		17673	–
Courtyard Walls and three gazebos to rear of Roft Castle House	Gresford; SJ3583956348; 53.100456°N 2.9597146°W	3 June 1996	Religious, Ritual and Funerary		17689	–
Former Schoolroom	Gresford; SJ3461654864; 53.086969°N 2.9776751°W	3 June 1996	Agriculture and Subsistence		17677	–
Gatepiers and attached Walls flanking main drive entrance to Roft Castle House	Gresford; SJ3588856368; 53.100641°N 2.9589869°W	3 June 1996	Industrial		17690	–
Grave of Ann Williams in the Graveyard to S of All Saints Church	Gresford; SJ3466554952; 53.087766°N 2.9769615°W	3 June 1996			17668	–
Graveyard Wall and Gatepiers to All Saints Church (included gates to S gateway)	Gresford; SJ3460354889; 53.087192°N 2.9778743°W	3 June 1996	Domestic		17672	–
Greenbank	Gresford; SJ3538954363; 53.082561°N 2.9660347°W	3 June 1996	Domestic		17679	–
Holly Cottage	Gresford; SJ3597856296; 53.100005°N 2.9576286°W	2 July 1962	Religious, Ritual and Funerary		9	–
Hoseley Bank Farmhouse	Gresford; SJ3678853963; 53.079133°N 2.9450733°W	3 June 1996			17682	–
Jessamine Cottage	Gresford; SJ3598756360; 53.100581°N 2.9575069°W	3 June 1996	Gardens, Parks and Urban Spaces		17662	–
Marford Hall	Gresford; SJ3606155836; 53.095881°N 2.9562974°W	3 June 1996	Industrial		17687	–
Myrtle Cottage	Gresford; SJ3597256343; 53.100427°N 2.9577275°W	3 June 1996			17665	–
No 1 of 6 Graves in the Graveyard to W of All saints Church	Gresford; SJ3461054957; 53.087805°N 2.9777836°W	3 June 1996	Domestic		17667	–
No 1 of 3 Grave in the Graveyard to SE of All Saints Church	Gresford; SJ3468954964; 53.087877°N 2.9766057°W	3 June 1996	Domestic		17669	–
No 1 of 5 Graves in the graveyard to NW of All Saints Church	Gresford; SJ3459354996; 53.088153°N 2.9780454°W	3 June 1996	Domestic		17666	–
No 18, Oakmount	Gresford; SJ3599155731; 53.094929°N 2.9573217°W	3 June 1996	Transport		17693	–
No 2 of 3 Graves in the Graveyard to SE of All Saints Church	Gresford; SJ3468854962; 53.087859°N 2.9766202°W	3 June 1996			17695	–
No 2 of 5 Graves in the Graveyard to NW of All Saints Church	Gresford; SJ3458954997; 53.088161°N 2.9781053°W	3 June 1996	Transport		17697	–
No 2 of 6 Graves in the Graveyard to W of All Saints Church	Gresford; SJ3461354958; 53.087814°N 2.977739°W	3 June 1996	Transport		17701	–
No 3 of 3 Graves in the Graveyard to SE of All Saints Church	Gresford; SJ3469254962; 53.087859°N 2.9765605°W	3 June 1996	Domestic		17696	–
No 3 of 5 Graves in the Graveyard to NW of All Saints Church	Gresford; SJ3459355000; 53.088189°N 2.9780462°W	3 June 1996	Domestic		17698	–
No 3 of 6 Graves in the Graveyard to W of All Saints Church	Gresford; SJ3461054955; 53.087787°N 2.9777832°W	3 June 1996	Recreational		17702	–
No 4 of 5 Graves in the Graveyard to NW of All Saints Church	Gresford; SJ3458855000; 53.088188°N 2.9781208°W	3 June 1996	Domestic		17699	–
No 4 of 6 Graves in the Graveyard to W of All Saints Church	Gresford; SJ3461354955; 53.087787°N 2.9777384°W	3 June 1996	Domestic		17703	–
No 5 of 5 Graves in the Graveyard to NW of All Saints Church	Gresford; SJ3459154994; 53.088135°N 2.9780748°W	3 June 1996	Gardens, Parks and Urban Spaces		17700	–
No 5 of 6 Graves in the Graveyard to W of All Saints Church	Gresford; SJ3461054953; 53.087769°N 2.9777828°W	3 June 1996	Transport		17704	–
No 6 of 6 Graves in the Graveyard to W of All Saints Church	Gresford; SJ3461454952; 53.08776°N 2.9777229°W	3 June 1996	Gardens, Parks and Urban Spaces		17705	–
Pair of Circular Privies	Gresford; SJ3597256200; 53.099142°N 2.957699°W	3 June 1996	Domestic		17686	–
Pant-yr-ochain Hotel	Gresford; SJ3461353371; 53.07355°N 2.9774158°W	3 June 1996	Domestic		17694	
Pistyll Bank	Gresford; SJ3586756395; 53.100882°N 2.9593059°W	3 June 1996	Domestic		17692	–
Primrose Cottage	Gresford; SJ3598856349; 53.100483°N 2.9574898°W	3 June 1996	Agriculture and Subsistence		17663	–
Roft Castle House	Gresford; SJ3585356333; 53.100323°N 2.9595026°W	3 June 1996	Institutional		17688	–
Roft Castle Stables	Gresford; SJ3578256354; 53.100503°N 2.960567°W	3 June 1996	Domestic		17691	–
Roft Lee	Gresford; SJ3595956316; 53.100183°N 2.9579163°W	2 July 1962	Domestic		42	–
Romney Cottage	Gresford; SJ3598256345; 53.100446°N 2.9575786°W	2 July 1962	Domestic		40	–
Schoolhouse and attached Walls and gatepiers	Gresford; SJ3461354858; 53.086915°N 2.9777187°W	3 June 1996	Domestic		17678	–
Smithy Cottage	Gresford; SJ3605856402; 53.100968°N 2.9564551°W	2 July 1962	Transport		45	–
Springfield Cottage	Gresford; SJ3603556405; 53.100992°N 2.9567991°W	2 July 1962	Transport		38	–
Springfield Farmhouse	Gresford; SJ3599956382; 53.100781°N 2.9573321°W	2 July 1962	Religious, Ritual and Funerary		39	–
Stable Block at Trevor Arms Hotel	Gresford; SJ3591556271; 53.099773°N 2.9585643°W	3 June 1996	Transport		17684	–
Stables at Cedar House	Gresford; SJ3442055013; 53.088284°N 2.9806315°W	3 June 1996			17675	–
Stone Cottage	Gresford; SJ3597856338; 53.100383°N 2.9576369°W	3 June 1996	Domestic		17664	–
Strode House	Gresford; SJ3463355017; 53.088347°N 2.9774525°W	7 June 1963	Commemorative		1593	–
Summerhouse at Holly Cottage	Gresford; SJ3597256281; 53.09987°N 2.9577152°W	3 June 1996	Gardens, Parks and Urban Spaces		17685	–
The Cottage also known as Walnut Cottage	Gresford; SJ3594056210; 53.099228°N 2.9581788°W	3 June 1996	Transport		17683	–
The Trevor Arms Hotel	Gresford; SJ3592456246; 53.099549°N 2.9584249°W	2 July 1962	Commemorative		44	–
Yew Tree Cottage	Gresford; SJ3594056292; 53.099965°N 2.9581952°W	2 July 1962	Domestic		43	–

== See also ==
- Grade II listed buildings in Wrexham County Borough
