= Wrexham Miners Project =

Mining museum in Wrexham, Wales

Coordinates: 53°02′59″N 3°00′14″W

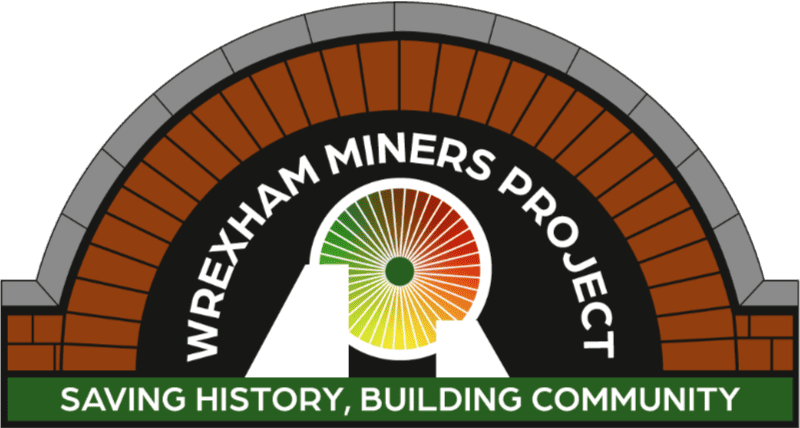

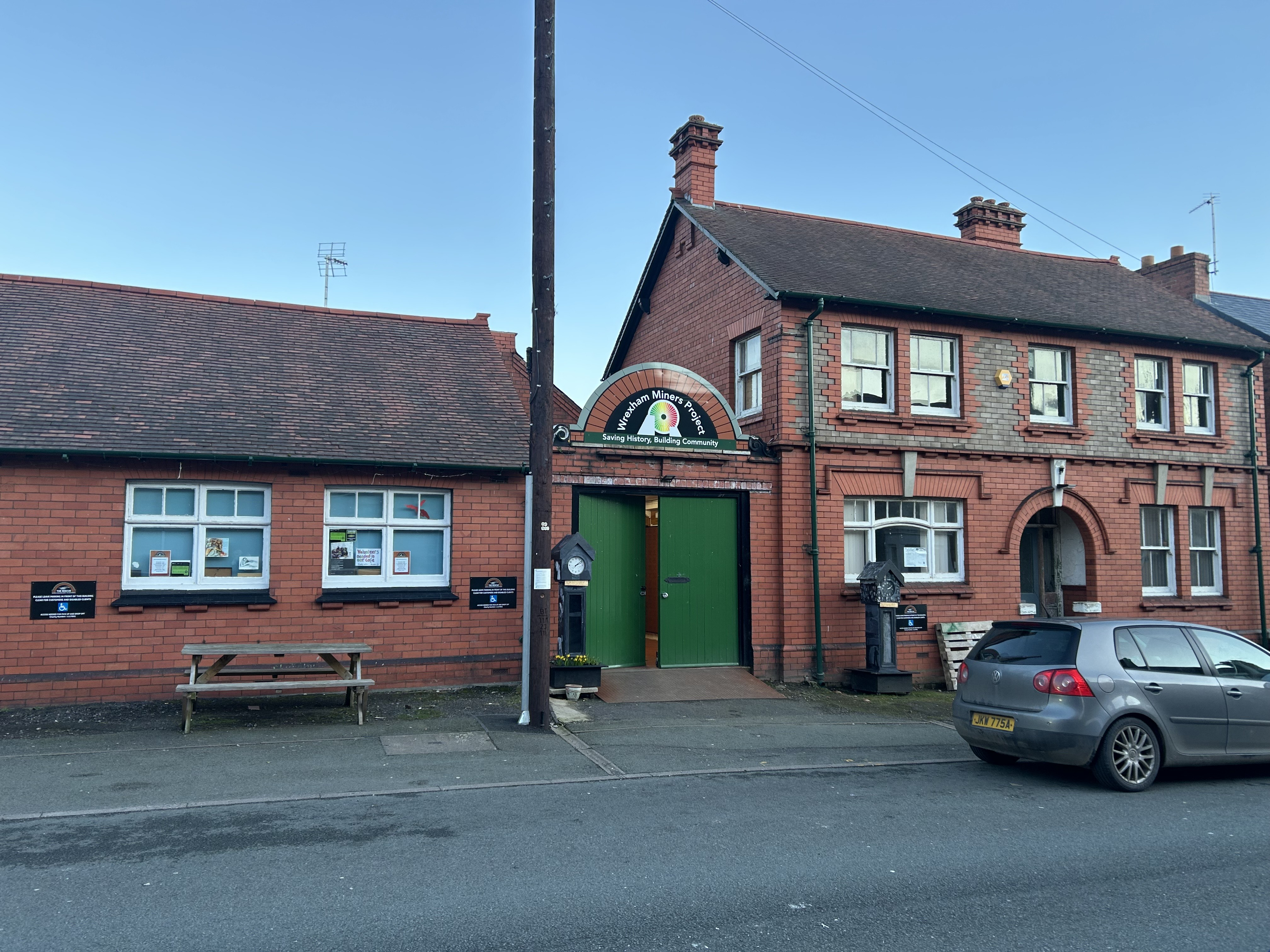
- Established: 2019
- Location: Wrexham
- Type: Local history museum
- Website: https://wrexhamminersproject.co.uk/

Listed Building – Grade II
- Official name: The Former Mines Rescue Centre
- Designated: 18 August 2010
- Reference no.: 87623

Wrexham Miners Project is a mining museum and community enterprise, based inside the Grade II listed former North East Wales Miners Rescue centre. The building houses a museum, community café, arts and events space, and a memorial to the 266 men killed in the 1934 Gresford disaster.

== History ==
Wrexham Mines Rescue Station was opened in November 1913 in response to the Coal Mines Act 1911, which mandated the creation of mines rescue stations throughout the United Kingdom. The act stipulated that rescue stations should be funded by colliery owners and be located within ten miles of collieries employing more than 100 men. The Wrexham station was completed in 1918 and housed training facilities for teams who were based at collieries in the North Wales Coalfield including Gresford, Bersham, and Llay.

On the 22 September 1934, rescuers trained at the station were heavily involved in efforts to save miners trapped at Gresford Colliery following a series of explosions at around 2am. Four rescuers, including three men based at neighbouring Llay Main Colliery lost their lives. The 266 victims of the Gresford disaster are commemorated on the Gresford Memorial Wall in the entrance to the Wrexham Miners Project.

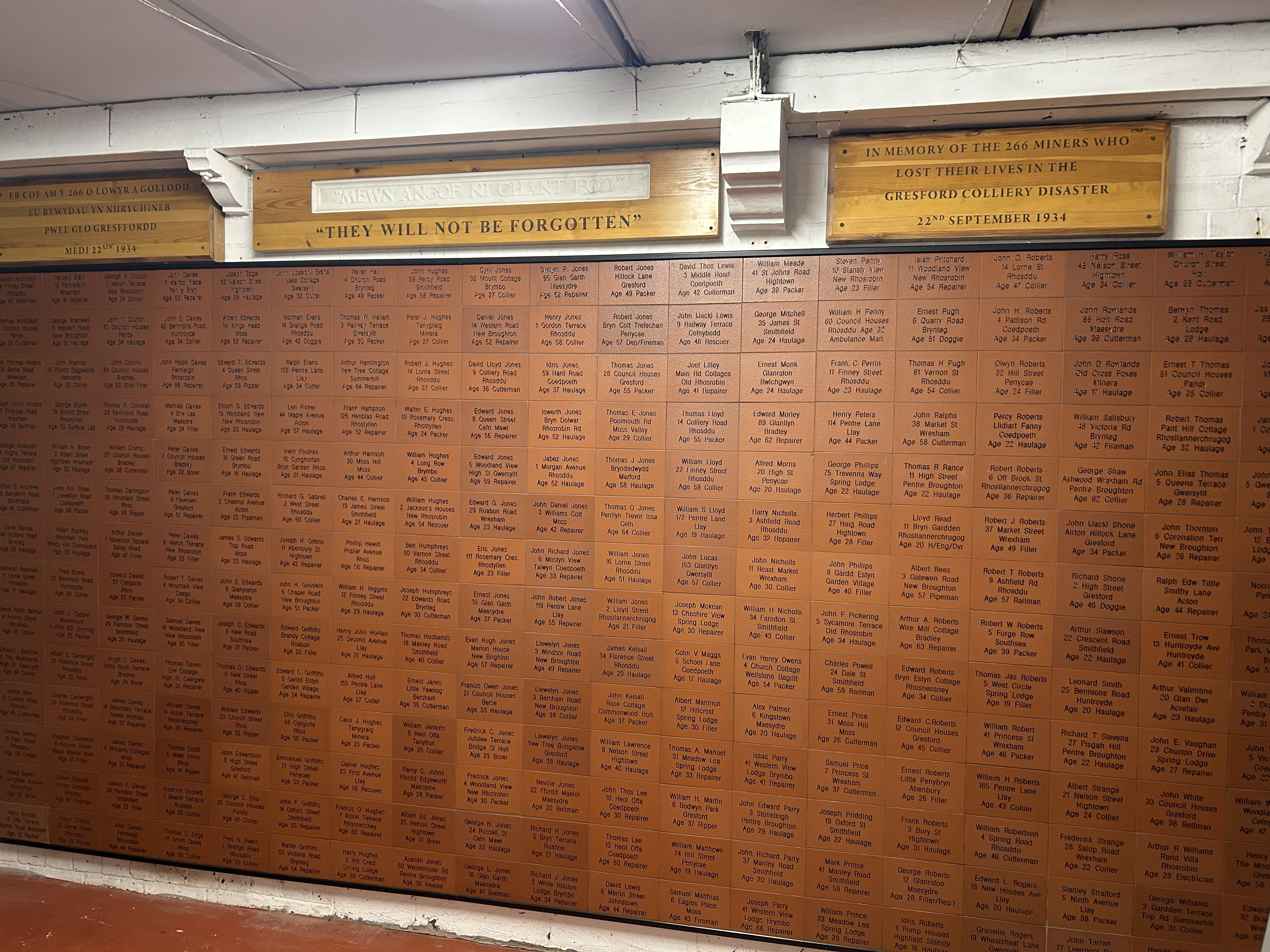
Gresford Memorial Wall

After the closure of Bersham Colliery in 1986, the building was transferred to the North Wales Fire and Rescue Service who extensively adapted it for use as a training centre. In 2003 the fire service vacated the premises and the following year Wrexham County Borough Council granted permission for the site to be demolished and redeveloped into eight apartments. During this period the building experienced severe damage, becoming semi-derelict.

In 2010, the site was acquired by the then Chairman of Wrexham A.F.C Neville Dickens, who ordered its demolition on 18 August. Former miners and members of the community attempted to halt the demolition works and on the same day, the Welsh heritage body Cadw granted the building emergency listed status, preventing any further destructive work being carried out. Dickins was later fined £2000 and ordered to pay £1700 in costs after pleading guilty to damaging a listed building.

== Redevelopment as a museum ==
In 2019, ownership of the rescue station passed to a charitable trust, whose aim is to restore the building and operate it as a coal mining museum and community venue. The charity works closely with local schools to educate children about Wrexham's mining heritage and hosts regular tours led by former mine rescuers.

The project was selected as the official charitable partner by Wrexham A.F.C. for the 24/25 season and the club has pledged £250,000 towards renovation costs. Humphrey Ker executive director of Wrexham A.F.C took part in the 2025 Manchester Marathon, raising over £130,000 in sponsorship for the charity. On the 17th of April 2025 the project was award an honorary fellowship from Wrexham University for its contributions to education, heritage and community development.
