= Gresford disaster =

1934 coal mining disaster near Wrexham, Wales

The Gresford disaster
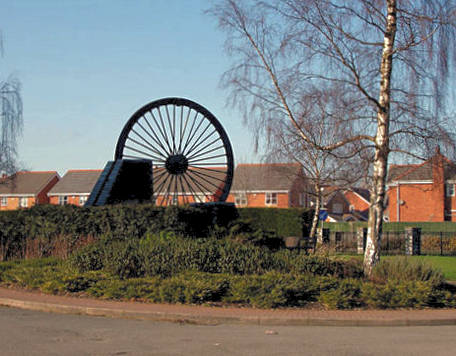
- The memorial on Bluebell Lane, Pandy, incorporating the old pit wheel, commemorating the victims of the Gresford Disaster
- Date: 22 September 1934
- Time: approximately 2 am
- Location: Gresford near Wrexham, Wales, UK; 53°04′22″N 02°59′28″W grid reference SJ338536
- Type: Coal mine explosion and fire
- Cause: Not determined
- Burial: 253 left entombed
- Inquiries: Walker, Brass & Jones 1937
- Awards: 9

The Gresford disaster (Welsh: Trychineb Gresffordd) occurred on 22 September 1934 at Gresford Colliery, near Wrexham, when an explosion and underground fire killed 266 men. Gresford is one of Britain's worst coal mining disasters: a controversial inquiry into the disaster did not conclusively identify a cause, though evidence suggested that failures in safety procedures and poor mine management were contributory factors. Further public controversy was caused by the decision to seal the colliery's damaged sections permanently, meaning that the bodies of only eight of the miners were ever recovered. Two of the three rescue men who died were brought out leaving the third body in situ until recovery operations began the following year.

== Background ==
The Westminster and United Collieries Group began to sink the pit at Gresford in 1908. Two shafts were sunk 50 yd (46 m) apart: the Dennis and the Martin. They were named after Sir Theodore Martin, the company chairman, and Mabel Dennis, wife of the company managing director Henry Dyke Dennis, who had ceremonially cut the first sods for each of the respective shafts in November 1907. Work was completed in 1911. The mine was one of the two deepest in the Denbighshire Coalfield: the Dennis shaft reached depths of about 2,264 ft (690 m) and the Martin shaft about 2,252 ft (686 m).

By 1934, 2,200 coal miners were employed at the colliery, with 1,850 working underground and 350 on the surface. Three coal seams were worked at Gresford across several sections:

1. Crank (South-East and No. 1 North sections), a 3 ft (0.91 m) seam producing high-quality household coal.
2. Brassey (South-East and No. 1 North sections), a 4 ft (1.2 m) to 12 ft (3.7 m) seam delivering harder 'steam' coal for commercial use.
3. Main (Dennis, South-East and No. 1 North sections), a 7 ft (2.1 m) seam that produced softer industrial coal.

Lying east of the Bala Fault, the mine was extremely dry, unlike mines to the west of the fault, and was therefore prone to firedamp. The Main coal in particular, which made up most of Gresford's output, was "of a very gassy nature".

The explosion occurred within the main seam of Dennis. This section, which began more than 1.3 mi (2.1 km) from the shaft bottom, was mined down a shallow gradient following the 1:10 dip of the seam. At the time of the disaster Dennis was divided into six "districts": 20's, 61's, 109's, 14's, 29's, and a very deep area known collectively as the "95's and 24's". Most districts in Dennis were worked by the longwall system where the coal face was mined in single blocks. Gresford was considered a modern pit by standards of the time and most districts in the Dennis section were mechanised except 20's and 61's, which were farthest from the main shaft (approximately 2.75 mi (4.43 km)) and which were still worked by hand.

Evidence given at the inquiry into the disaster suggested there were a number of adverse conditions in the pit prior to the explosion. Firstly, underground mine ventilation in some districts of Dennis was probably inadequate; in particular, the 14's and 29's districts were notorious for poor air quality. The main return airway for the 109's, 14's and 29's districts was said to be 4 ft (1.2 m) by 4 ft (1.2 m) and far too small to provide adequate ventilation. Secondly, working conditions in the 2,600 ft (790 m) deep 95's and 24's district were always uncomfortably hot. Thirdly, it was alleged, there were also numerous breaches of safety regulations leading to the districts being in an unfit condition to operate.

The disaster inquiry was told that one of the pit deputies, whose job was to oversee the safety of a district, admitted that he also carried out shotfiring during his shifts, in addition to his other duties. It was revealed that he fired more charges during his shift than a full-time shotfirer could have safely carried out. The colliery had incurred an operating loss in 1933, and the pit manager, William Bonsall, is thought to have been under pressure from the Dennis family to increase profitability. Henry Dyke Dennis was reputed in the Wrexham district to be a forceful individual who had more control of the pit than the manager. Bonsall was not a trained mining engineer and at Gresford the role of mine agent, which would normally be held by a technically experienced person with authority to stand up to both manager and owners, had for some time been temporarily filled by the company secretary since the retirement of the previous agent Thomas Hanson Cockin. Gresford had previously had a good safety record, but there were suggestions that in the two years Bonsall had not had Cockin to help him the pit's management had come under increasing commercial pressure. Bonsall admitted he had spent little time in the Dennis section of the pit in the months before the disaster, as he was overseeing the installation of new machinery in the "Slant", an area in the South-East section. Work on improving the Dennis section ventilation had been halted, and the inquiry's chair later confessed to "an uneasy feeling that Mr. Bonsall was overridden" on the matter.

== Explosion ==
On Saturday 22 September 1934 at approximately 2:00 am a violent explosion ripped through the Dennis section. The explosion started a fire near 29's district and blocked the main access road, known as "142's Deep", to all the section's other districts. At the time up to 500 men were working underground on the night shift with more than half in the affected areas. The rest were in the Slant district of the South-East section about 2 mi (3.2 km) from the explosion; many there were unaware for some time afterwards that a disaster had occurred.

In Dennis the night overman, Fred Davies, who was on duty at the bottom of the main shaft, heard a crashing sound and was enveloped in a cloud of dust for around 30 seconds. When it cleared he telephoned the surface and told Bonsall, the manager: "something has happened down the Dennis. I think it has fired." Bonsall immediately went into the mine to try to establish what had occurred. At approximately 3:30 am the afternoon shift overman, Benjamin Edwards, reported that parts of the Dennis main road were on fire beyond a junction, known as the Clutch, where the haulage motors were located, and that a large number of miners were trapped beyond the blaze. Meanwhile, the shift that was working the Slant was ordered to the pit bottom and told to get out of the mine.

Only six men had escaped from the Dennis section, all of whom were working in 29's district: Robert (Ted) Andrews, Cyril Challoner, Thomas Fisher, David Jones (the district's night shift deputy), Albert (Bert) Samuels, and Jack Samuels. Some of the group were sitting taking a mid-shift break about 300 yd (270 m) north of the Clutch when the initial explosion happened. Jack Samuels, in his testimony at the inquest, described hearing a "violent thud [...] followed at once by dust" while at the face and commenting "that's the bloody bottom gone". By the "bottom", Samuels clarified that he meant 14's district, which lay below them. A colleague advised them to leave the district via the "wind road" which was the 29's air return drift. Samuels told a further 30 men working in the 29's district to follow. But as the six-man lead group went ahead attempting to fan the air to mitigate the effects of the deadly afterdamp, they soon realised the other miners had not followed them. Jack Samuels described how Jones repeatedly fell back, commenting he was "done", but Samuels told him to "stick it" and shouldered the deputy up a ladder; Samuels was commended at the inquest for his bravery and leadership of the group. After a long and difficult escape up 1:3 gradients, several ladders, and past rockfalls, the six miners eventually rejoined the Dennis main road and met Andrew Williams, the under-manager, who along with Bonsall had immediately descended the Dennis main shaft on being notified of the explosion. Williams took David Jones and went on towards the Clutch, while the remaining five went to the pit bottom and safety.

Beyond the Clutch, Williams found three falls in the main haulage road. Once he got past them he discovered a fire had started about 20 yards before the main entrance to 29's district, blocking escape from the districts further inbye, and immediately sent back for men and materials to fight it. The evidence of Williams, Bonsall and Ben Edwards, who all saw the fire at this critical point, differed on how large it was: Bonsall thought they could not get close enough to it to fight it, but Edwards, who was able to view the burning spot directly, said that it did "not seem much of a fire", and the final report of the inquest was inconclusive as to whether the fire could have been put out at this stage if better equipment had been to hand. Williams and the overman Fred Davies made an initial attempt to get up to the fire using breathing apparatus, but were driven back by fumes.

== Rescue attempts ==
Shortly before dawn, volunteers began entering the pit with ponies to tackle the fire and help clear debris. The area's trained mine rescue teams were alerted, though there were delays in doing so which were later suggested to reflect management disorganisation. In the interim many volunteers from the area's mines were sent below to assist: a manager from another colliery, sent down at about 4:30 am, described his attempts to extinguish the fires. Seven dead miners, all men who had been working near the Clutch, were soon brought to the surface. By 5:00 am the Gresford rescue team was already in the pit and some of the teams from the neighbouring Llay Main Colliery were at the surface, though they grew increasingly frustrated while waiting to be called down.

At 8:40 am, the 18-man Llay team finally received a call down the pit and went in accompanied by a Gresford miner who was to show them the way. In a somewhat disorganised fashion John Charles Williams and his two rescue men making up the No. 1 Llay team, along with a Gresford rescue man W. Hughes, were instructed by the Gresford staff then below ground to check the mile-long return airway of the 20's district. Bonsall later stated that his intent had only been that the team establish the atmosphere in the return: he claimed that his order had been "not to go in until they got definite instructions from me, because what I had in my mind was that it would be charged with carbon monoxide, and I did not want them to go through that because there would not be the slightest chance of getting men back through it." The instruction was, however, misinterpreted by a deputy as meaning that the team should physically enter the return; accordingly the rescue team entered the airway using breathing apparatus, despite the fact that their canary died instantly. Williams, the team's leader, ordered them back when after several hundred yards after the airway ahead narrowed to 3 ft (0.91 m) by 3 ft and less. Two of the team then in Williams' words "seemed to get alarmed" and collapsed, possibly after removing their nose clips; Williams then tried dragging a third team member for over 40 yd (37 m) towards safety before being overcome himself by poisonous gases. Williams would be the only survivor; he was said by his family to be the man who later wrote the anonymous broadside ballad "The Gresford Disaster", which was highly critical of the mine's management.

Despite the fact that the carbon monoxide levels in the 20's return suggested that no one farther inbye could be left alive, rescue efforts became focused on trying to fight the fire at 29's Turn, using sand, stone dust, and extinguishers. The miners trapped in the most northerly districts, the 20's and 61's, would have been more than 1 mi (1.6 km) on the other side of the fire, and rockfalls at the entrance to the 29's soon made it clear there was little chance of escape for the men trapped in the affected districts. As the falls were levelled, the fire become more severe: Parry Davies, captain of the Llay No. 2 rescue team, described the whole end of the level as "one mass of flame, the coal sides of the roadway, burning in one white mass, and the more stones we moved to one side, the more air we put on to the flames [...] It was most peculiar to see the flames from that fire, all the colours of the rainbow, a sight which I will never forget."

By early Saturday morning large crowds of concerned relatives and off-duty miners had gathered silently at the pit head awaiting news. Hopes were raised in the evening when rumours began circulating that the fire in the Dennis main road was being brought under control; families waiting at the surface were told rescue teams would soon be able to reach the miners in the 29's, the nearest district beyond the Clutch.

However, by Sunday evening it became clear that conditions in the pit had become extremely hazardous. Fire took hold in 29's haulage road as well as 142's Deep, and the rescue teams were withdrawn as further explosions took place behind a heavy fall on the far side of the fire. Relatives were told the shafts into the Dennis section would be capped because no one could have survived and it was far too dangerous to try to recover any further bodies. The final man to leave the pit, John McGurk, president of the Lancashire and Cheshire Miners' Federation, commented, "There is no chance that any man is alive. I have been down in pits after ten explosions, but I have never seen anything like this. From the point where the fire is raging for twenty yards the stones are red-hot".

More explosions continued to occur within the pit over the next few days. On 25 September, a surface worker named George Brown became the 265th victim when he was killed by flying debris after one blast blew the cap off the Dennis shaft.

== Recovery efforts ==
In total, only 11 bodies (eight miners and the three rescue men) were ever recovered from the mine. Inquests recorded the cause of death as carbon monoxide poisoning. The mine shafts remained sealed for six months, after which unaffected districts were gradually re-entered. Recovery teams first entered the pit, using breathing apparatus, on 7 March 1935. The damage caused by explosions and by the water directed down the pit was severe, and efforts concentrated on building stoppings so that fresh air could be readmitted to the pit. In May, Parry Davies, captain of the Llay Main No. 2 rescue team, accompanied by two inspectors and a Ministry of Mines doctor, entered into the 20's return airway to recover the body of John Lewis of Cefn-y-Bedd, one of the members of the No. 1 team killed in the initial rescue attempts. By July, a party of men using breathing apparatus had proceeded 700 yards beyond the stoppings into the Dennis section as far as the top of the haulage road of the 142's Deep, though they found no trace of any of the missing miners. Within a matter of months, normal ventilation was restored to the Slant section: this work was, to that date, the first ever reopening of a pit by men working in an irrespirable atmosphere. However, after retrieving air samples from beyond the permanent stoppings, the mining inspectors refused to allow recovery teams to go further into the Dennis districts to retrieve bodies, despite calls from the workers themselves that they should be allowed to do so. Dennis was never reopened; the bodies of the remaining 253 victims of the disaster would be left in the sealed districts.

== Inquiry ==
By the end of September 1934, 1,100 Gresford miners had signed on the unemployment register. Relief funds were set up by the Mayor of Wrexham, the Lord Lieutenant of Denbighshire, and the Lord Mayor of London. Their efforts raised a total of more than £580,000 for the dependants of the victims equivalent to £36,000,000 in 2025. (Note: UK Consumer Price Index inflation figures from 1209–2024 based on data from "Inflation calculator", Bank of England, London, 18 February 2026)

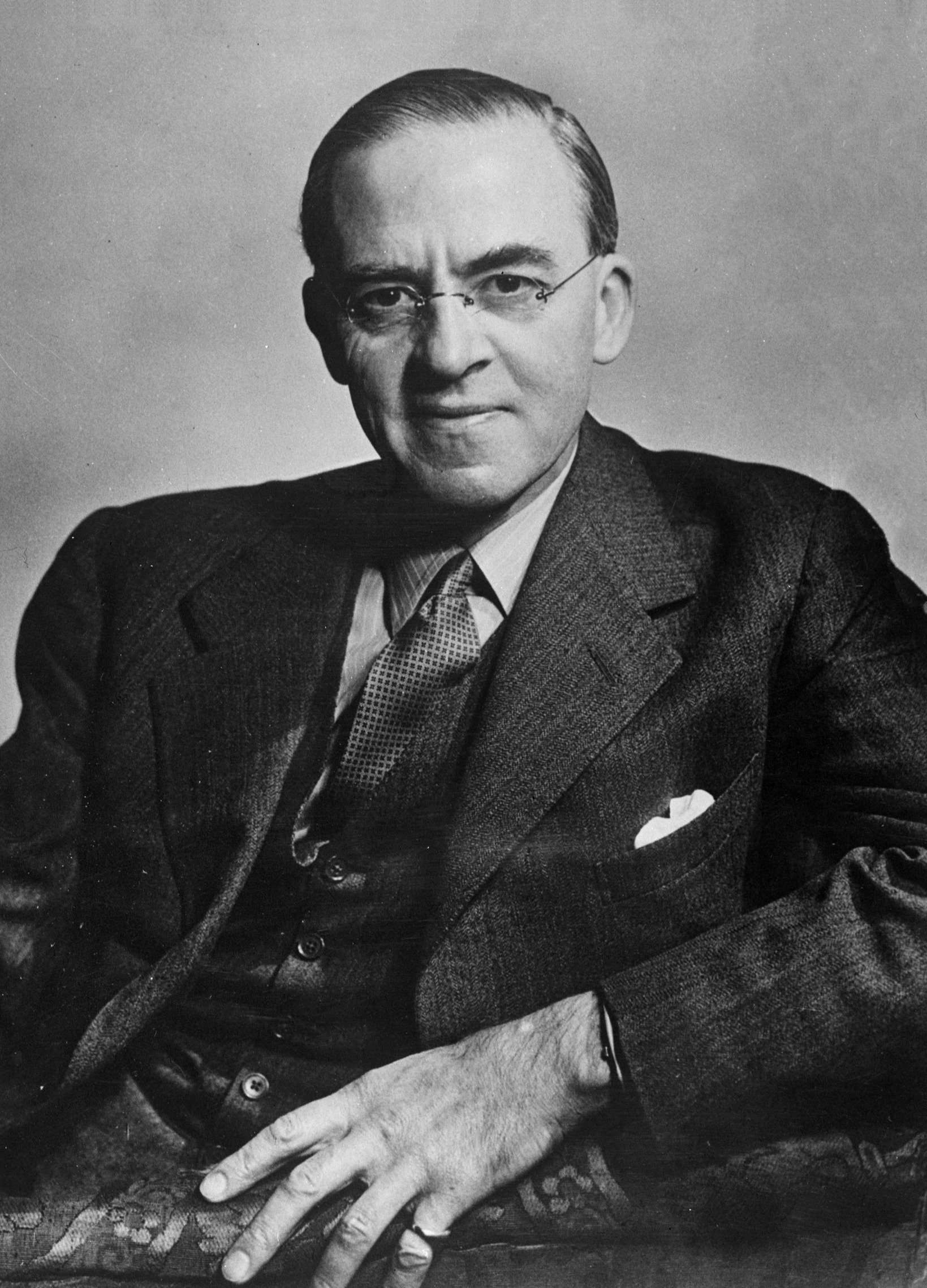
Stafford Cripps, who represented the miners at the inquiry. Cripps was consistently critical of Gresford's management, colliery officials, and the Mines Inspectorate.

On 25 October 1934 the official inquiry opened at Church House on Regent Street in Wrexham. It was chaired by Sir Henry Walker, His Majesty's Chief Inspector of Mines, who had himself been in the pit during the rescue attempts. The miners, through the North Wales Miners' Association, were represented by Sir Stafford Cripps; the mine owners, mindful of the fact they could face criminal charges, hired a formidable legal team including Hartley Shawcross. Two mining assessors, one approved by the miners and the other by the colliery management, were also appointed to assist Walker and the inquiry. Local interest in the inquiry was enormous: as time went on the colliery officials called as witnesses faced increasing hostility from the public gallery, to the degree the atmosphere began to affect the quality of their evidence. The inquiry was marked by sensational allegations about the conduct of both sides: it was claimed that the deputies had after the accident held meetings together with the inspectorate, leading to a protest by miners, and there were several comments that the unions had paid miners to give evidence, causing an uproar in court.

The miners' legal representatives presented several theories at the inquiry as to cause of the explosion. Evidence had rapidly emerged that for much of the time, and especially during the night shifts, the pit was not under the direct supervision of the under-managers and manager but was effectively run by the colliery officials – the overmen and deputies or 'firemen' – and often by the deputies alone. While the deputies called to give evidence all claimed the pit was safe, miners alleged that the deputies had actively encouraged unsafe working, and many said that the deputies ignored complaints about safety: one claimed "if you talked to a fireman it was like talking to a prop". Cripps said he believed an explosion was triggered on 142's Deep near to 95's district by shotfiring near a main airway, noting that the explosion had occurred about the time the 95's night shift deputy, Sam Matthias, would have arrived at this point. The blast had ignited a pocket of firedamp which, Cripps suggested, had accumulated in the airway because of inadequate ventilation and the lax attitude of the management to monitoring gas levels, contrary to section 29 of the Coal Mines Act 1911 (1 & 2 Geo. 5. c. 50). The heart of Cripps's argument was that the mine's management had focused quite calculatedly on maximum production, and that the deputies had accordingly been encouraged to ignore safety regulations. While the regulations also gave individual miners safety responsibility, many said in evidence that they were unwilling to speak out for fear of victimisation at the hands of the deputies, or that they would lose their jobs.

The assessor approved by the miners, Joseph Jones, also theorised that a large quantity of methane gas, which had accumulated at the coal face in the 14's district, might have been ignited through an accident with a safety lamp or from a spark from a mechanised coalcutter. Jones was sharply critical of the management, stating that 14's was a "veritable gasometer", that there had been "flagrant and persistent breaches of the Coal Mines Act and General Regulations" and that the deputy responsible for ordering the rescue men into 20's airway was "guilty of manslaughter". Both Cripps and Jones suggested the Inspectorate itself was partly culpable for the explosion through its failure to enforce the Regulations: Jones noted the inadequate work of the local and divisional inspectors, Dominy and Charlton, at Gresford in the months leading up to the disaster and Cripps argued the Inspectorate had an interest in turning a blind eye to safety failings. Cripps went so far as to describe junior inspector for mines Percy George Dominy’s inspections as "an absolute farce" and commented that it was "pathetic that a person who answers questions like that should be in charge of the inspection of mines in a large area of the country".

The inquest was initially adjourned on 14 December 1934, pending reopening of the Dennis section to obtain further evidence. Although recovery teams wearing self-contained breathing apparatus re-entered the sealed pit in May 1935, both government inspectors and officials from the Westminster and United Collieries Group would not allow any further attempts to be made to access the Dennis section. Evidence of 'heating' in the air samples taken beyond the stoppings, and the consequent risks of restarting fires, were cited as the reason: Walker agreed, though at the time of writing his report he hoped "that this heating will subside in time and that then it will be safe to re-enter the Dennis Section".

As there were no other reports concerning the deeper parts of the section, the inquiry considered explanations presented by the legal representatives of the pit's management and by the inspectors. The divisional inspector, Charlton, countered the miners' theories by suggesting that firedamp had actually accumulated further up the Dennis main road just beyond the Clutch. This gas was ignited at the Clutch when a telephone was used to warn miners of the influx of firedamp. Shawcross suggested that the explosion might have been caused by the spontaneous heating of a pillar of coal, based on reports of a burning smell in the area of the Clutch prior to the disaster. Shawcross had been able to demonstrate that the evidence of the miners with respect to stone dusting on the main haulage roads was exaggerated or untrue, and used this to cast doubt on their reports of gas and dangerous shotfiring practices at the face. The assessor chosen by the mine owners, John Brass, also argued that the explosion, judging by the positions in which the bodies of the haulage men were found, had taken place at the Clutch, and that the gas had come from a new drift being driven from there to 29's for ventilation. Brass dismissed the miners' testimonies of poor conditions in 14's as "extravagant and contradictory", claiming that the district's high productivity would have been impossible if lamps were constantly being extinguished by gas, and stating that witnesses had claimed to smell gas when "firedamp has no smell such as has been described".

A year before the inquiry published its conclusion, coal production resumed at Gresford from the South-East Martin section in January 1936.

In 1937 the inquiry published its findings. Despite being presented with evidence of management failures, a lack of safety measures, bad working practices and poor ventilation in the pit, Walker drew very cautious conclusions about the cause in his final verdict. This was largely because the two assessors chosen by the miners and by the pit's management, and the barristers representing them, had given widely different suggestions as to the source of the explosion; though Walker stated he had "grave suspicions" regarding shotfiring near an airway in 95's, the cause suggested by Cripps. Unusually, as neither Jones nor Brass agreed with Walker's findings, both appended individual reports to the main text.

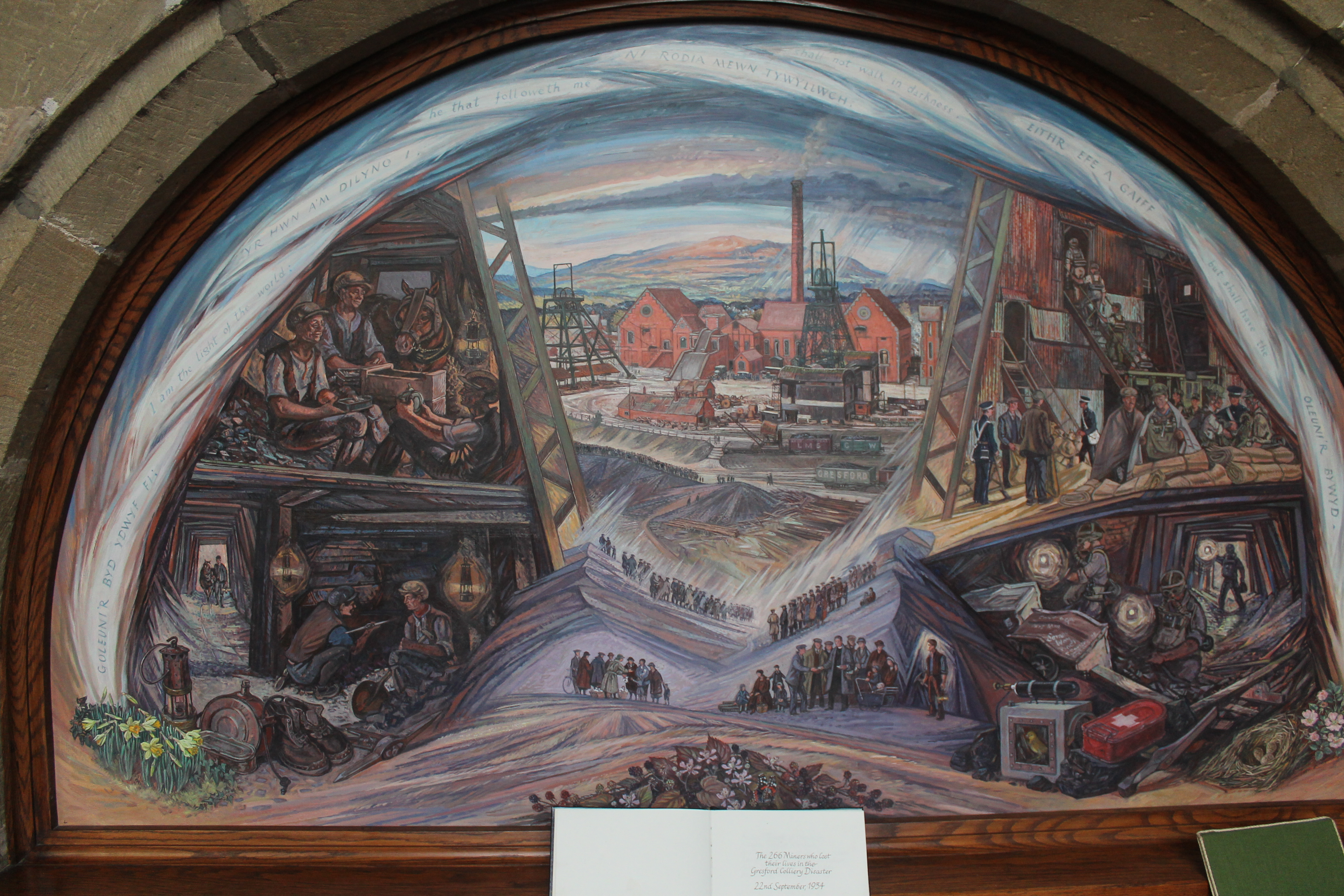
Painting in All Saints' Church, Gresford commemorating the disaster, above a book with the names of those who died.

Without any decisive evidence, Walker's conclusions did not attribute any outright blame or definitive cause for the disaster. However, in a debate in the House of Commons in February 1937 following the release of Walker's report, the Labour politician David Grenfell condemned the management of the colliery because the miners' testimonies had told:

...of lamps having been extinguished by gas, blowing the gas about with a banjack, of protests and quarrels about firing shots in the presence of gas. There is no language in which one can describe the inferno of 14's. There were men working almost stark naked, clogs with holes bored through the bottom to let the sweat run out, 100 shots a day fired on a face less than 200 yards wide, the air thick with fumes and dust from blasting, the banjack hissing to waft the gas out of the face into the unpacked waste, a space 200 yards long and 100 yards wide above the wind road full of inflammable gas and impenetrable for that reason.

Later in 1937, legal proceedings were started in Wrexham's petty sessions court against the pit manager, the under-manager and United & Westminster Collieries Limited, the owners of the mine. Aside from the evidence of poor working practices, it was discovered that Bonsall had after the accident instructed an assistant surveyor, William Cuffin, to falsify records of ventilation measurements during several weeks when none had actually been taken. However, the court dismissed most of the charges without the mine owners ever being called to give evidence. The only conviction against the management at Gresford Colliery was for inadequate record-keeping, for which Bonsall was fined £150 plus costs.

Permission to re-enter the Dennis section was never given, and no examination or inspection of the deeper parts of Dennis was ever undertaken. This decision was widely perceived by the public as a deliberate attempt by the mine owners and Inspectorate to cover up any evidence of their culpability in the cause of the explosion. The miners' unions continued to press for entry into the sealed districts to recover bodies, with Grenfell and senior union officials including Herbert Smith and Joe Hall of the Miners' Federation of Great Britain volunteering to lead the recovery teams personally, but the matter was finally settled when the three Gresford rescue teams themselves said they would follow the Inspectorate's advice in the matter. It is probable that resentment at the dominance of the North Wales industry by Yorkshire, represented by Smith and Hall, played a part in their decision.

== Legacy ==
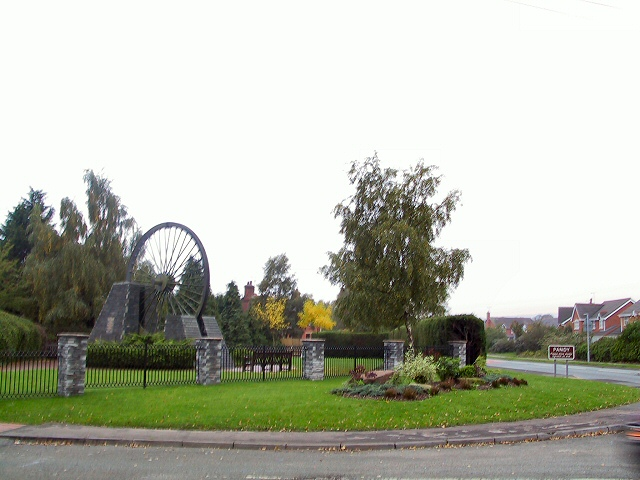
Another view of the Gresford Memorial, which was unveiled by Charles, Prince of Wales in 1982

Bonsall was portrayed by Cripps and others as a ruthless and cynical manager, but researchers now think that he is more likely to have been a "weak man driven beyond his capabilities" whose evidence was affected by the extreme exhaustion and stress of enduring 4000 questions and 20 hours of cross-examination at the inquiry. One exchange between Cripps and Bonsall regarding the ventilation of 29's district largely destroyed the manager's credibility and left him in a state of near collapse. Bonsall was, however, effectively a substitute for the real target of the miners' anger, the owners of Gresford. By contrast there was widespread sympathy for Williams, the under-manager, despite him facing equally harsh questioning from Cripps. Williams was understood to have recognised the dangerous conditions on taking the job at Gresford and had begun to rectify them: he also had three sons working in the pit, giving him, it was suggested, a personal interest in its safety.

Cripps used the evidence obtained at the inquiry to call for nationalisation of the coal industry. This eventually occurred in 1947 when the pit, and others like it, were taken over by the National Coal Board. As part of the takeover agreement, nearly all the operating records and correspondence relating to the private management of Gresford Colliery were deliberately destroyed by the trustee.

Gresford Colliery finally closed on economic grounds in November 1973. In the 1980s the site was redeveloped as an industrial estate. In 1982 a memorial to the victims of the disaster was erected nearby; it was constructed using a wheel from the old pit-head winding gear. The last underground link to the disaster, Mr Eddie Edwards, who began work in the mine aged 14, and who participated in the rescue efforts, died on 6 January 2016, aged 102.

Since 2021, Wrexham A.F.C. football shirts have had '1934' embroidered on the reverse in memory of the disaster. The 10th episode of Season 2 of the sports documentary series Welcome to Wrexham explores the memory of the disaster and its relationship to the football club and local community.

There is a memorial wall for the miners in the mining museum that is part of the Wrexham Miners Project.

Original documents relating to the disaster, including a falsified safety log, are held in the National Archives, London, and are available for public inspection.

== Music ==
The disaster is commemorated by the hymn tune "Gresford". Known as "The Miners' Hymn", it was written by a miner named Robert Saint from Hebburn, South Tyneside. The tune remains popular with many colliery brass bands, and is always played at the annual Miners' Picnics around the North of England, especially at the Durham Miners' Gala.

"The Gresford Disaster" is a folk song in 6/8 time which appears to have been published anonymously and distributed as a broadside shortly after the colliery explosion. It has been widely recorded, including versions by Ewan MacColl, The Hennessys, Alex Campbell and The Albion Band. It is included in the Roud Folk Song Index (no:3089), and is discussed by Roy Palmer in his 1974 book Poverty Knock: a picture of industrial life in the nineteenth century through songs, ballads and contemporary accounts (despite being a 20th-century composition).

The song "The Colliers" on Seth Lakeman's 2006 album Freedom Fields is about the disaster.

== Literature ==
Joanna Eden's 2026 novel The Wind Road is a mythical reimagining of the Gresford disaster.

== See also ==
- Senghenydd colliery disaster, a firedamp explosion at the pit near Caerphilly, Glamorgan, killed 440 people on 14 October 1913.

== Citations and bibliography ==
- "Ventilation", Coal Mines Act, UK Parliament, 1911, §29, 1 & 2 Geo 5, chapter 50 – via Durham Mining Museum
- The Colliery Guardian (16 November 1934), "Gresford Colliery Explosion", The Colliery Guardian, p 915, col 1 – via Durham Mining Museum
- Davies, P (1973), "Gresford Colliery Explosion", Transactions of the Denbighshire Historical Society, vol. 22
- Grigson, Geoffrey, ed. (1975), Penguin Book of Ballads, Penguin – via Vaughan Williams Memorial Library
- Hansard (23 February 1937), House of Commons Debates, vol. 320, House of Commons, columns 1849-1966
- John (13 October 2015), Gresford Colliery, WelshCoalMines.co.uk
- John (13 October 2015b), Llay Main collieries, WelshCoalMines.co.uk
- Lambeth, Roy (2017), Gresford Colliery. Original Pitwork website now hosted by Durham Mining Museum
- Lerry, G.G. (1968), Collieries of Denbighshire (2nd (revised) ed.), W. Williams, ISBN 978-0901600004
- Local Correspondence (26 July 1935), "Notes from the Coal Fields", The Colliery Guardian, p 178, col 2 – via Durham Mining Museum
- NottsExMiner (31 August 2016), Gresford Colliery Explosion, 22nd September 1934 Plan 1, flickr
- Riley, Bill (2017), Gresford Disaster. Original Pitwork website now hosted by Durham Mining Museum
- Smart, Sue (17 June 2008), "The life and times of Grandad Jack", Chester Evening Leader, archived from the original on 16 October 2008
- Staff Reporter (14 January 2016), "Tributes to Eddie Edwards, the final link to Gresford disaster", The Leader
- "The Gresford Disaster", The Science & Art of Mining, Thos. Wall & Sons, p 88, col 1, 29 September 1934 – via Durham Mining Museum
- Walker, Sir Henry, CBE LlD (Commissioner); Brass, John, MInstCE MIMinE (Assessor); Jones, Joseph, CBE JP (Assessor) (January 1937), Reports on the causes of and circumstances attending the explosion which occurred at Gresford Colliery, Denbigh on 22nd September, 1934 – via Durham Mining Museum
- Wedd, Charles (1928), The Geology of the Country Around Wrexham, II: Coal measures and newer formations, HMSO
- Williamson, S (1999), Gresford: Anatomy of a Disaster, Liverpool University Press
- WCBC Heritage (2017), Ace Spades from Gresford, Wrexham County Borough Museum
- Yates, Richard (2008), Pitmen's anthems still so popular, Evening Chronicle
