= Bradley Park =

Bradley Park may refer to:

- Laura Bradley Park, a park in Peoria, Illinois, United States
- Bradley Park, an area of Neptune Township, New Jersey, United States
- Bradley Park, a housing estate in Nunsthorpe, Grimsby, England
- Bradley Park, a park in Bradley, Huddersfield, England

== See also ==
- Bradley Park Rangers F.C. (1951-1965), a Welsh football team from Bradley, Wrexham, Wales
- Brad Park, Canadian ice hockey player
