= Wrexham (disambiguation) =

Wrexham is a city in Wales.

Wrexham may also refer to these proximate things:

== Administrative regions ==
- Wrexham (county borough), a principal area of Wales (from 1996)
- Wrexham (UK Parliament constituency), a Westminster electoral seat (from 1918)
- Wrexham (Senedd constituency), an electoral seat at Cardiff Bay (from 1999)
- Wrexham Built-up area, the city's largely contiguous urban area (determined in 2011)
- Wrexham Maelor, a defunct district of Clwyd (1974–1996)

== Organisations ==
- Roman Catholic Diocese of Wrexham, a church body/district (founded 1987)
- Wrexham A.F.C., a professional association football club (founded 1864)
  - Wrexham AFC Women, (formerly Wrexham Ladies, founded 2003)
- Wrexham County Borough Council, a local government body (founded 1996)
- Wrexham Lager Brewery, a beer company (founded 1881)
- Wrexham, Mold and Connah's Quay Railway, a rail company (1862–1897)

== See also ==
- Wrexham railway station (disambiguation)
