= Seven Wonders of Wales =

Traditional list of landmarks in north Wales

Locations of the Seven Wonders of Wales, numbered as they appear in the list.

The Seven Wonders of Wales (Welsh: Saith Rhyfeddod Cymru) is a traditional list of notable landmarks in north Wales, commemorated in an anonymously written rhyme:

Pistyll Rhaeadr and Wrexham steeple,
Snowdon's mountain without its people,
Overton yew trees, St Winefride's wells,
Llangollen bridge and Gresford bells.

The rhyme is usually supposed to have been written sometime in the late 18th or early 19th century by an English visitor to North Wales. The specific number of wonders may have varied over the years: the antiquary Daines Barrington, in a letter written in 1770, refers to Llangollen Bridge as one of the "five wonders of Wales, though like the seven wonders of Dauphiny, they turn out to be no wonders at all out of the Principality".

There are also other shorter versions of the rhyme, including:

Gresford bells and Wrexham steeple,
Llangollen vale and all the people.

A similar version to this included the last line as "Llangollen Bridge and all Welsh people".

The seven wonders comprise:

| Image | Wonder | Location | Date | Notable Features |
|---|---|---|---|---|
| | Pistyll Rhaeadr | Near Llanrhaeadr-ym-Mochnant, Powys | n/a | A tall waterfall, falling 240 ft (73 m) in three stages |
| | St Giles' Church; Eglwys San Silyn | Wrexham | 16th-century | The 16th-century tower of St Giles' Church in Wrexham can be seen for miles |
| | Overton yew trees Coed ywen Owrtyn | Overton-on-Dee, Wrexham County Borough | Planted at different times, ~3rd–12th century | 21 yew trees at St Mary's Church |
| | St Winefride's Well; Ffynnon Wenffrewi | Holywell, Flintshire | AD 660 (as pilgrimage site), constructions date to medieval | Historically claimed to have healing waters |
| | Llangollen Bridge; Pont Llangollen | Llangollen, Denbighshire | Current construction dates from around 1500 | Site of the first stone bridge to span the Dee |
| | Bells of All Saints' Church, Gresford; Clychau Gresffordd | Gresford, Wrexham County Borough | 13th-century | The church bells are listed for their purity and tone |
| | Snowdon; Yr Wyddfa | Snowdonia, Gwynedd | n/a | Highest mountain in Wales at 3,560 ft (1,085 m) |

== See also ==
- Seven Natural Wonders of the UK
- Seven Wonders of the World
