= Wrexham Built-up area =

Urban area of Wrexham, Wales

Coordinates: 53.05672°N 3.01143°W

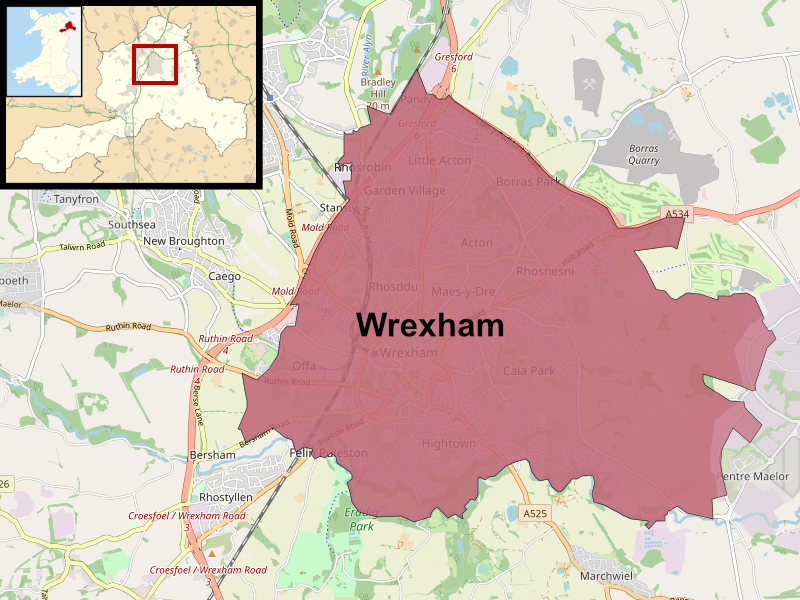
Map of the Wrexham Built-up area as of the 2021 census

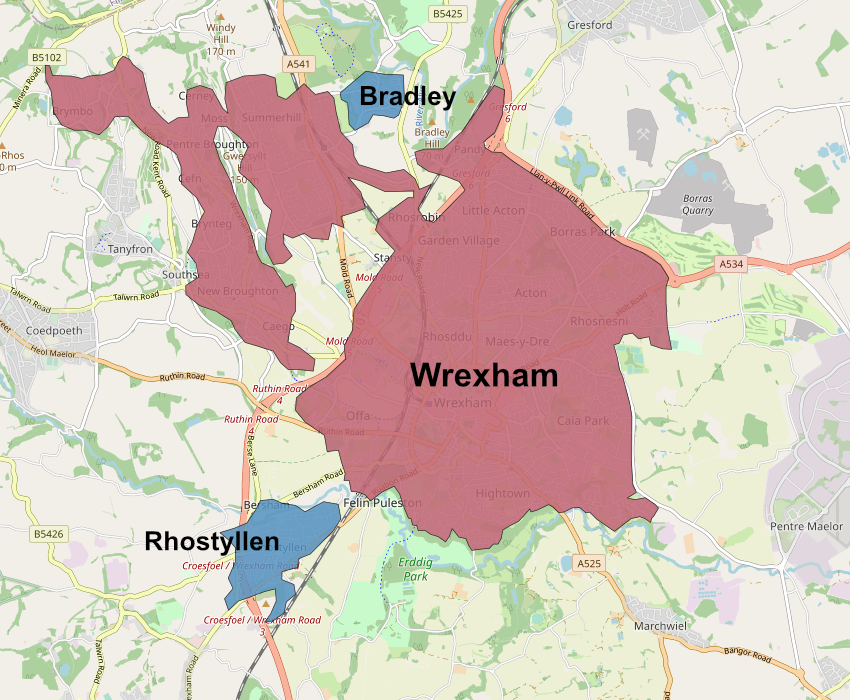
Map of the Wrexham Built-up area used in the 2011 census with subdivisions, Bradley and Rhostyllen.

The 2011 BUA within Wrexham County Borough, highlighted in lighter red.

The Wrexham Built-up area (also known as the Wrexham Urban Area) is an area of land defined by the United Kingdom Office for National Statistics (ONS) for population monitoring purposes. It is an urban conurbation fully within Wrexham County Borough and consists of the urban area centred on the city of Wrexham. Until the 2021 census, it also included the historically industrial settlements to the west including Gwersyllt, Rhostyllen, Brymbo, Bradley and New Broughton.

== Description ==
=== 2011 census ===
The detailed methodology of the process used across the UK by ONS in 2011 is set out in 2011 Built-up Areas - Methodology and Guidance, published in June 2013. It is summarised as "..a ‘bricks and mortar’ approach, with areas defined as built-up land with a minimum area of 20 hectares (0.2 km^{2} / 0.077 mile^{2}), while settlements within 200 metres of each other are linked. Built-up area sub-divisions are also identified to provide greater detail in the data, especially in the larger conurbations."

The total population of the built-up area defined on this basis in 2011 was 65,692 at the 2011 census making Wrexham the fourth largest built-up area in Wales, and largest in North Wales at the time. This accounts for almost half (48%) of the entire country borough's population of 136,055 residents, with the remainder living in Rhosllanerchrugog's built-up area of 25,362 residents (2011 census) or in various villages and towns in rural parts of the county borough.

=== 2021 census ===
For the 2021 census, the "Wrexham built-up area" was reduced to 44,785 residents, with other areas formerly considered part of the BUA split into separate ones.

== Subdivisions (2011 census) ==
The ONS provides sub-division statistics for the Wrexham built-up area for the 2011 census.

Rank	Urban sub-area name	Population	Area	Population density (per km^{2})
-	Wrexham (built-up area)	65,692	17.3625 km^{2} (6.7037 sq mi)	3,783.56/km^{2} (9,799.37/sq mi)
1	Wrexham (subdivision)	61,603	16.22 km^{2} (6.26 sq mi)	3,798.0/km^{2} (9,836.7/sq mi)
2	Rhostyllen	2,766	0.8575 km^{2} (0.3311 sq mi)	3,225.7/km^{2} (8,354.4/sq mi)
3	Bradley	1,323	0.285 km^{2} (0.110 sq mi)	4,642/km^{2} (12,023/sq mi)

== See also ==
- List of conurbations in the United Kingdom
- List of Welsh principal areas by population
- List of Welsh principal areas by area
- List of localities in Wales by population
