= Alyn Waters =

Country park in Wrexham County Borough

Alyn Waters Country Park
- Parc Gwledig Dyfroedd Alun
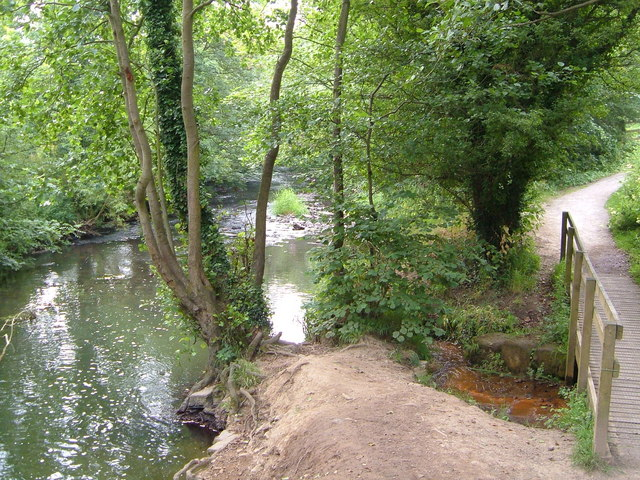
- River Alyn close to Bradley Mill bridge

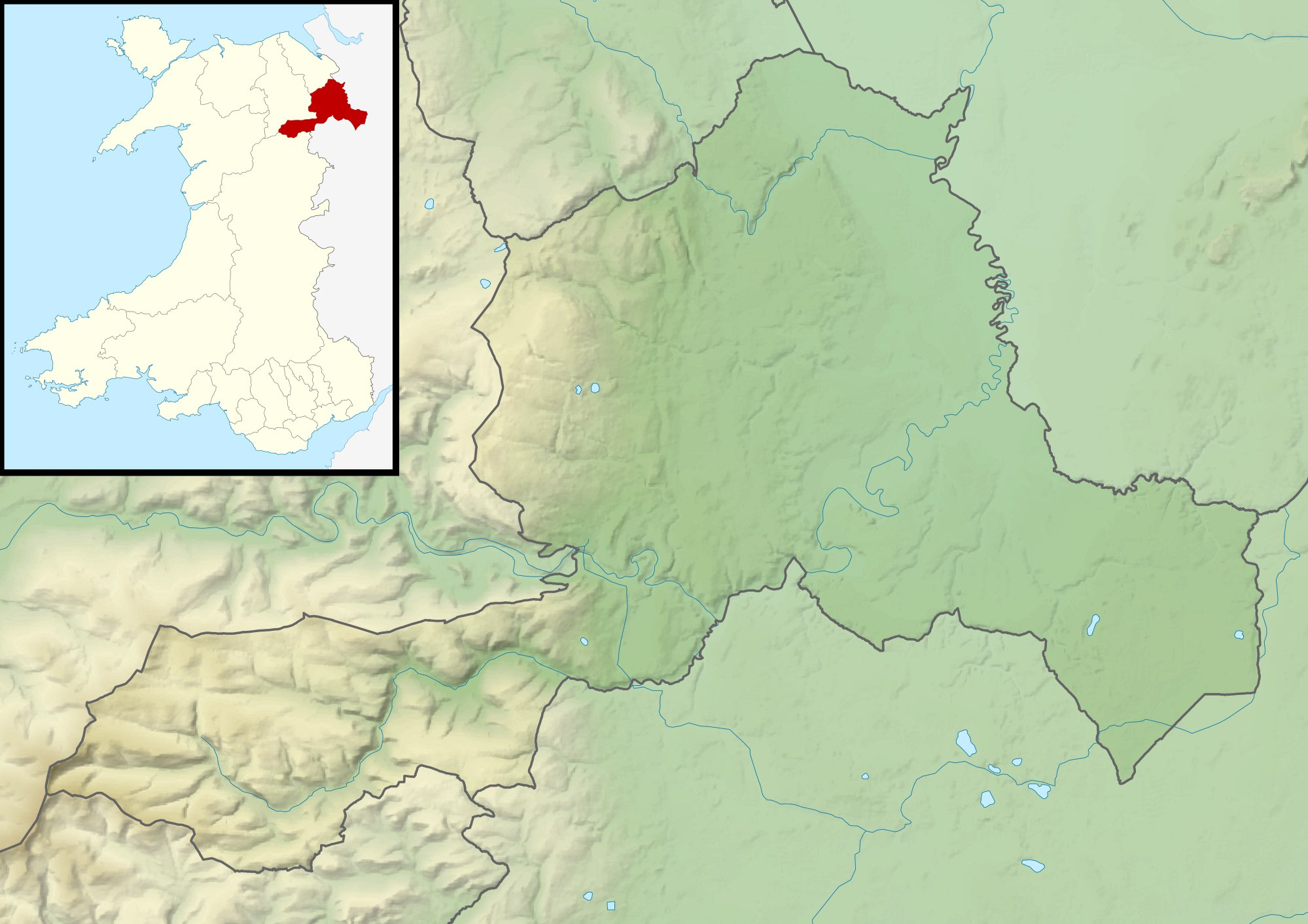
- Location within Wrexham
- Interactive map of Alyn Waters Country Park
- Location: Wrexham County Borough, Wales
- Nearest town: Wrexham
- OS grid: SJ3244754762
- Coordinates: 53.0855°N 3.0087°W
- Area: >400 acres (1.6 km^{2})
- Manager: Wrexham County Borough Council
- Facilities: Visitor Centre

Alyn Waters (Welsh: Dyfroedd Alun) is a country park situated between Gwersyllt and Llay in Wrexham County Borough, in the north-east of Wales, and is managed by Wrexham County Borough Council.

Alyn Waters takes its name from the River Alyn which passes through the park and a footpath runs parallel to the river. There are many paths and trails crossing the park. The park is split in two by the river with one part in Gwersyllt and the other part in Llay.

Alyn Waters includes a cafe open all year round on the Gwersyllt side and Llay side has a playground. There is car parking on both sides.

In July 2024, the country park was awarded the Green Flag Award.
