= Gresford Colliery =

Former coal mine in Gresford, Wrexham, Wales

- Interactive map of Gresford Colliery
- Location: Gresford, Wales; 53°04′22″N 02°59′28″W
- Products: Coal
- Opened: 1911
- Active: 1911-1973
- Closed: 1973
- Company: United Westminster & Wrexham Collieries

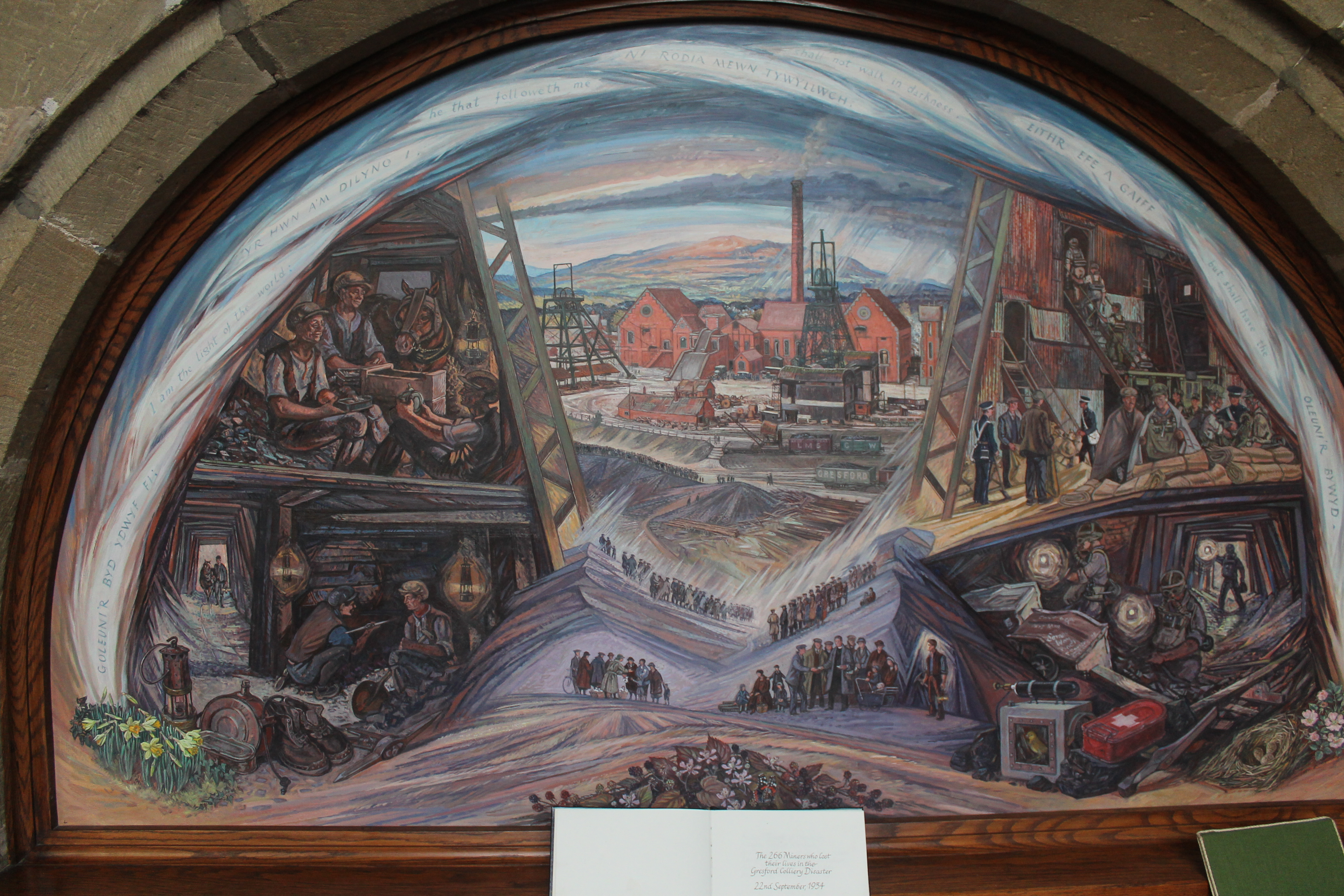
Painting in All Saints' Church, Gresford commemorating the 1934 Gresford disaster, above a book with the names of the 266 who died.

Gresford Colliery was a coal mine located a mile from the North Wales village of Gresford, near Wrexham.

== History ==
=== Sinking ===
The North Wales Coalfield, of which Gresford was part, runs from Point of Ayr, on the Flintshire coast to the Shropshire border. Although coal mining records date back to the 15th century, it was not heavily exploited until the 18th century. By 1900, more than 12,500 miners produced three million tonnes a year.

Industrialist Henry Dennis of Ruabon, and his son Henry Dyke Dennis, began the colliery near Gresford in 1907. The site was on the edge of the Alyn Valley, between the Shrewsbury and Chester Railway (later the Great Western Railway's Birkenhead to London Paddington line), and the old main road between Wrexham and Chester.

The Dennis' company United Westminster & Wrexham Collieries took four years to sink two deep shafts, the Dennis (downcast) and the Martin (upcast), located 50 yd (46 m) apart. It was one of the deepest coal mines in the Denbighshire coalfield, the Dennis shaft reaching a depth of about 2,264 ft (690 m) and the Martin shaft about 2,252 ft (686 m).

=== Operations ===
The first coal was produced in June, 1911 and full production reached before the outbreak of World War I. Three seams were worked: the Crank, the Brassey, and the Main. House coal was produced from the Crank seam, the Brassey seam was virtually gas free whilst the Main seam was very gaseous. Working conditions at the colliery were dusty, and very hot, the temperature often more than 90 °F (32 °C).

The Dennis section was divided into six districts: the 20s, 61's, 109's, 14's and 29's districts, along with a very deep district known as "95's and 24's". These districts were worked by the longwall system but the 20's and 61's, which were furthest from the shaft, were worked by hand when the remaining districts were mechanised. The coal was renowned as being of very good quality and hot burning. In 1934, 2,200 men were employed at the colliery, with 1,850 working underground and 350 on the surface.

==== Strike, mechanisation and profitability ====
The government passed the Coal Mines Act 1911 (1 & 2 Geo. 5. c. 50) requiring every new colliery to have two intake airways into the mine, to allow air to circulate in the workings and only one air intake be allowed for the movement of coal. Gresford Colliery was in operation before the law came into force and was exempt. Retro digging a new shaft made little commercial sense, and not much profit had ever came out of the pit, so the Dennis' didn't undertake the work.

After the General Strike, cost-cutting measures were introduced in all mines, including in safety provision. Five local collieries - Westminster, Wrexham & Acton, Vauxhall and Gatewen - shut in quick succession during the 1920s and 1930s. Mechanisation, believed by the workers and unions to improve working conditions, created more dust and explosions, in an economic climate where the government were reluctant to enforce regulation.

By 1934, there were two main sections to Gresford Colliery, the Dennis and the South-east, which were both part mechanised. 2,200 miners worked in three eight-hour shifts. Some miners worked double shifts to earn extra money despite it being illegal. The Dennis family owned a residual 45% stake in the colliery, and wanting additional profitability put manager, William Bonsall, under pressure to increase the productivity of the whole colliery.

=== Accident ===
One of Britain's worst coal mining disasters occurred at the colliery. The Gresford Disaster occurred on Saturday 22 September 1934, when 266 men died following an underground explosion.

As there was a football match on the Saturday afternoon between Wrexham and Tranmere Rovers, on Friday, 21 September, many miners doubled up their shifts so they could attend the match. This meant there were more miners down the pit than there ordinarily would have been.

The explosion occurred in the Dennis district at around 2am, the time when the men would be having their mid-shift snack. Only six men survived the blast. A fire followed the explosion, and the mine was sealed off at the end of the following day. On 25 September, rescuer George Brown was killed on the surface when another explosion blew a seal off the Dennis shaft and he was hit by flying debris. Only eleven bodies were ever recovered. The mine owners docked the men half a day's pay, as they had not completed a full day's shift.

==== Investigation ====
Sir Henry Walker, the Chief Inspector of Mines, chaired the inquiry which opened on 25 October 1934, at Church House, Wrexham. Walker was assisted by John Brass, for the mine owners; and Joseph Jones for the Miners' Federation of Great Britain (MFGB). Both sides employed barristers, Hartley Shawcross for the owners; while the MFGB were offered pro bono publico the services of Labour MP and barrister Sir Stafford Cripps.

Walker wanted access to the evidence, and although the pit was reopened in March, 1935, for safety reasons the Dennis section remained closed, and was eventually sealed. Having adjourned the inquiry in December, 1934, by December 1936, Walker legally had to make his final report.

The report noted that before the accident ventilation in some districts was possibly inadequate: in particular, it was noted that 14's and 29's districts were poorly ventilated. The report after the accident, considered that the main return airway for the 109's, 14's and 29's districts was far too small at 4 feet by 4 (according to one witness). Evidence was given that 95's and 24's district, at 2,600 feet deep, was uncomfortably hot. There were numerous breaches of regulations regarding the firing of explosive charges in 14's district, taking of dust samples, and other matters. The colliery had made an operating loss in 1933, and the manager, William Bonsall, had been under pressure from the Dennis family to increase profitability. He had spent little time in the Dennis section of the pit in the months before the disaster, as he was overseeing the installation of new machinery in the mine's other section, the South-Eastern or Slant.

Subsequent to the accident a number of theories were advanced in the Report as to the explosion's exact cause: Sir Stafford Cripps, the miners' legal representative, suggested that an explosion had been triggered in 95's by shotfiring (the firing of explosive charges) near a main airway. The miners' appointed Assessor also surmised that a large quantity of gas had accumulated at the top of the face in 14's district, which was then ignited by an accident with a safety lamp or by a spark from a coalcutter. The legal representatives of the pit's management, however, suggested that firedamp had accumulated in the main Dennis haulage road beyond the Clutch (a junction on the main drift where the underground haulage machinery was located) and which was ignited at the Clutch when a telephone was used to warn miners of the influx of gas. This interpretation sought to deny that poor working practices were the ultimate cause of the disaster.

After the report was presented to parliament in January 1937, in April 1937, at Wrexham Petty Sessions, 42 charges were made against the colliery company, the manager and officials. Most were withdrawn or dismissed, but manager William Bonsall was convicted on eight counts of breaking mining safety law, and fined £140 with £350 costs.

==== Gresford Colliery Disaster Relief Fund ====
The national and local newspapers focused on stories of heroism and bereavement, with speculation about who was at fault, or what caused the disaster left alone.

The disaster left 591 widows, children, parents and other dependants. In addition, over 1500 miners were temporarily without work, until the colliery was re-opened in January 1936. After each newspaper opened its own fund, they and national donations by September 1935 totalled £565,000. The sum was divided equally split between the Lord Mayor of London's "Mansion House Fund" and the Lord Lieutenant of Denbighshire's "Denbighshire Fund." The local committee which met in Wrexham took monies from both funds, and appointed a visitor to ensure that immediate relief was distributed in the form of grants and temporary weekly allowances. The two funds were amalgamated in July 1935, under the provision of a trust deed to form the Gresford Colliery Disaster Relief Fund, with three trustees: the Lord Mayor of London, the Governor of the Bank of England and the Lord Lieutenant of Denbighshire. They devolved power to a local administration committee, who paid monies via an honorary actuary. The fund was wound up after the deaths of the last dependants, and donated residual monies to the creation of the memorial to the victims unveiled in 1982.

=== After the accident ===
The mine remained sealed off for six months after the explosion. Districts of the mine were gradually reopened, although the Dennis district, where the explosion occurred remained sealed. Coal production restarted in January 1936, and by 1945 there were 1,743 men employed.

Gresford was officially closed on 10 November 1973 due to a combination of exhaustion of existing coal reserves and geological problems.

==== In memoriam ====
Wrexham Library has the memorial book on display with a list of the dead still buried underground. There is also a painting in All Saints' Church, Gresford, depicting scenes from the disaster and rescue.

Nine years after the closure of the pit, in 1982 the head gear wheel was preserved as part of the Gresford Disaster Memorial. It was dedicated on 26 November 1982, in the presence of the Prince and Princess of Wales, and the surviving relatives of those miners killed in the disaster. In 2000 as a final act of remembrance, the names of all those who lost their lives in the pit were added to the memorial.

On the 75th anniversary in 2009, various memorials took place, including Wrexham Football Club delaying their match by 15 minutes - as they would normally have done in the days when the mine was working.
