= Gresford =

Village in Wales

Gresford: Welsh: Gresffordd
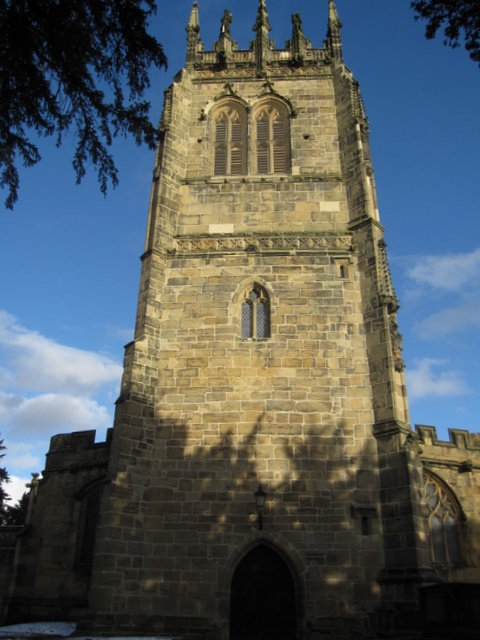
- All Saints' Church, Gresford

- Location within Wrexham
- Population: 5,010 (2011 Census)
- OS grid reference: SJ353549
- Community: Gresford
- Principal area: Wrexham
- Preserved county: Clwyd
- Country: Wales
- Sovereign state: United Kingdom
- Post town: WREXHAM
- Postcode district: LL12
- Dialling code: 01978
- Police: North Wales
- Fire: North Wales
- Ambulance: Welsh
- UK Parliament: Wrexham
- Senedd Cymru – Welsh Parliament: Wrexham
- List of places UK Wales Wrexham 53.087°N 2.966°W Map of the community

Gresford (/ˈɡrɛsfərd/; Welsh: Gresffordd Welsh pronunciation: [ˈɡrɛsfɔrð]) is a village and community in Wrexham County Borough, Wales.

According to the 2001 Census, the population of the community, which also includes the village of Marford, was 5,334, reducing to 5,010 at the 2011 census.

The Grade I listed All Saints' Church, Gresford has been described as the finest parish church in Wales, and has the most surviving medieval stained glass of any Welsh church. Its bells are one of the traditional Seven Wonders of Wales.

The former Gresford Colliery was the site of the Gresford disaster, one of Britain's worst coal mining disasters, when 266 men died in an underground explosion on 22 September 1934.

== Etymology ==
The name Gresford is generally supposed to have been derived from the Old English elements græs and ford ('grassy ford'). The name was recorded as Gretford in the Domesday Book of 1086, and was later rendered as Gresworth, Cresford and Grefford, although documentary evidence suggests that these were merely alternative spellings and the name remained Gresford throughout.

A cymricized form Groesffordd was in use by the 16th century, with y groes ffordd, implying a meaning 'crossroads', noted in a document of 1591. This etymology was repeated in some 19th-century guidebooks; Samuel Lewis recorded the name was "anciently Croesfordd" which he translated as 'the road to the cross'. Lewis stated that the shaft of this cross was still present in his time, and was located half a mile to the south of the present church. The name cross (croes or y groes in Welsh) appears in a number of locations in Welsh tithe maps and a damaged wayside cross is recorded as a medieval relic. This derivation is also recorded by Thomas Morgan and Nicholas Carlisle.

== History ==
There is some evidence of Roman and post-Roman settlement in the Gresford area. These include a Roman altar thought to depict the Greek Goddess Nemesis found within the church in 1908, and a hoard of Roman coins dating from between 150 and 300 AD. Gresford is known to have been the site of an ancient Celtic church and a stand of yew trees in the churchyard has been dated to 500AD.

Gresford is also home to two historic wells, including Parsonage Well enclosed by stone and inscribed with the initials A:E:M:N—most likely representing Anne, Elizabeth, Maria, and Newcome—daughters of Rev. Henry Newcome, who served as Gresford’s vicar in the late 18th to early 19th century. Gresford is also home to All Saints’ Well (also known as St Catherine’s Well) a historical source of village water and possibly a pilgrimage site.

In common with many of the towns and villages of the England–Wales border or Marches, Gresford has gone through periods of both English and Welsh occupation during the Anglo-Welsh wars, being variously part of the Hundred of Duddestan and the commote of Maelor Gymraeg; The whole area was resettled by Welsh aligned to Owain Gwynedd in 1170–1203. At this time the bishopric was transferred from that of St. Werburgh's Chester to St. Asaph, and the vicars of the village were Welsh with patronymic names (for example, Morud ap Gwarius, who became vicar in 1284).

Approaching Gresford from the Wrexham direction, on the left hand side of the road, there was a tree known as the 'Cross Tree', and alongside this there is the base of an ancient stone cross. This tree was removed after 1984, and has since been replaced with a young tree.

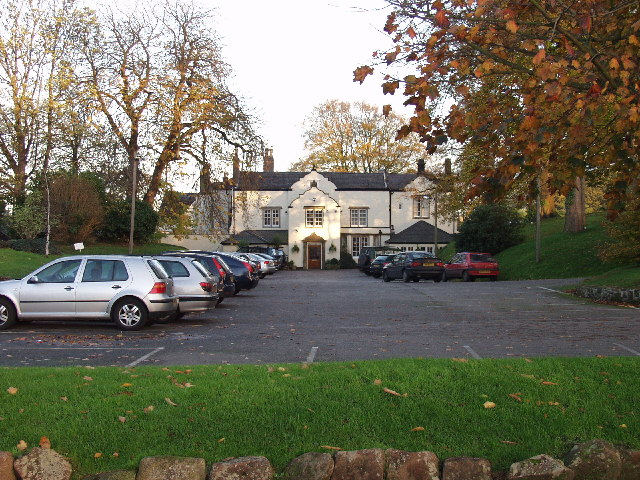
Pant-yr-Ochain Inn

Until the late 19th century, the parish boundary encompassed a large area, including the townships of Burton, Llay, Rossett and Gwersyllt, as well as several townships later included in Isycoed. The bells of the parish church, All Saints' Church are one of the traditional Seven Wonders of Wales. Gresford Church dates to 1492 and is a large building considering the size of what the population would have been in the present day boundaries of the parish. The base of the church tower has earlier remnants of a previous building and an earlier roofline of a former transept can be detected in the tower. The colour of the stone is quite distinctive, and is typical of the Wrexham area. It is a sandy brown Millstone Grit, locally referred to as Cefn stone.

Pant Iocyn (later Pant-yr-Ochain) house was built in the 1550s alongside the road from Gresford to Wrexham by Edward Almer, MP and three times High Sheriff of the county. It was one of the chief houses in east Denbighshire and descended in the Almer family until it was bought and enlarged by Sir Foster Cunliffe, 3rd Baronet in 1785. The 18th-century addition now serves as a gastro pub.

== Gresford Colliery ==
Henry Dennis and his son, Henry Dyke Dennis, began sinking a coal mine near Gresford in 1888, taking four years for the 3,280 ft deep shafts to be completed. The coalmine was located on the edge of the Alyn Valley, between the Shrewsbury and Chester Railway (later the GWR Birkenhead-Paddington line) and the old main road between Wrexham and Chester. The first coal was produced from June 1911, with full production reached before the outbreak of the First World War. The coal was renowned in the area as being of very good quality and hot burning.

Gresford Colliery was the site of one of Britain's worst coal mining disasters. The Gresford Disaster occurred on 22 September 1934, when 266 men died following an underground explosion. The bodies of only 11 of the miners underground at the time of the explosion were recovered. The headgear wheel is preserved and forms part of the Gresford Disaster Memorial, along with a plaque. The disaster is commemorated in the hymn tune "Gresford", which is also known as "the Miners' Hymn", written by Robert Saint of Hebburn, himself also a miner. This tune has been played regularly by many colliery brass bands over the years and is found on a number of recordings, and is also played at the annual Miners' Picnics around the North of England, especially at the Durham Miners' Gala.

The colliery lasted until 1973 when it was closed due to geological problems.

== Transport ==
The stone-built Gresford (for Llay) Halt, on the Shrewsbury and Chester Railway was midway up the notorious Gresford Bank. The bank was so steep that a refuge siding was required at the station in the event of engines having to leave some of their load behind to get up the hill. Banking engines were also used on occasions. The station was demoted to halt status in 1956 and was closed altogether from 1964.

== Education ==
All Saints' Voluntary Aided Church in Wales School is the village primary school. It still uses part of the school building constructed in 1874, in memory of Thomas Vowlier Short, a Christ Church, Oxford University theologian, and former Bishop of St Asaph.

== Sports ==
Gresford has a football team, Gresford Athletic F.C., which currently competes in the Cymru North. The club was founded in 1946 and plays its home games at Clappers Lane.

Gresford has a cricket club called Gresford Cricket Club, which also plays at Clappers Lane.

== See also ==
- Horsley Hall, Gresford
- East Gresford, New South Wales
- Gresford Methodist Church
