= Gresford Methodist Church =

Church in Gresford, Wales

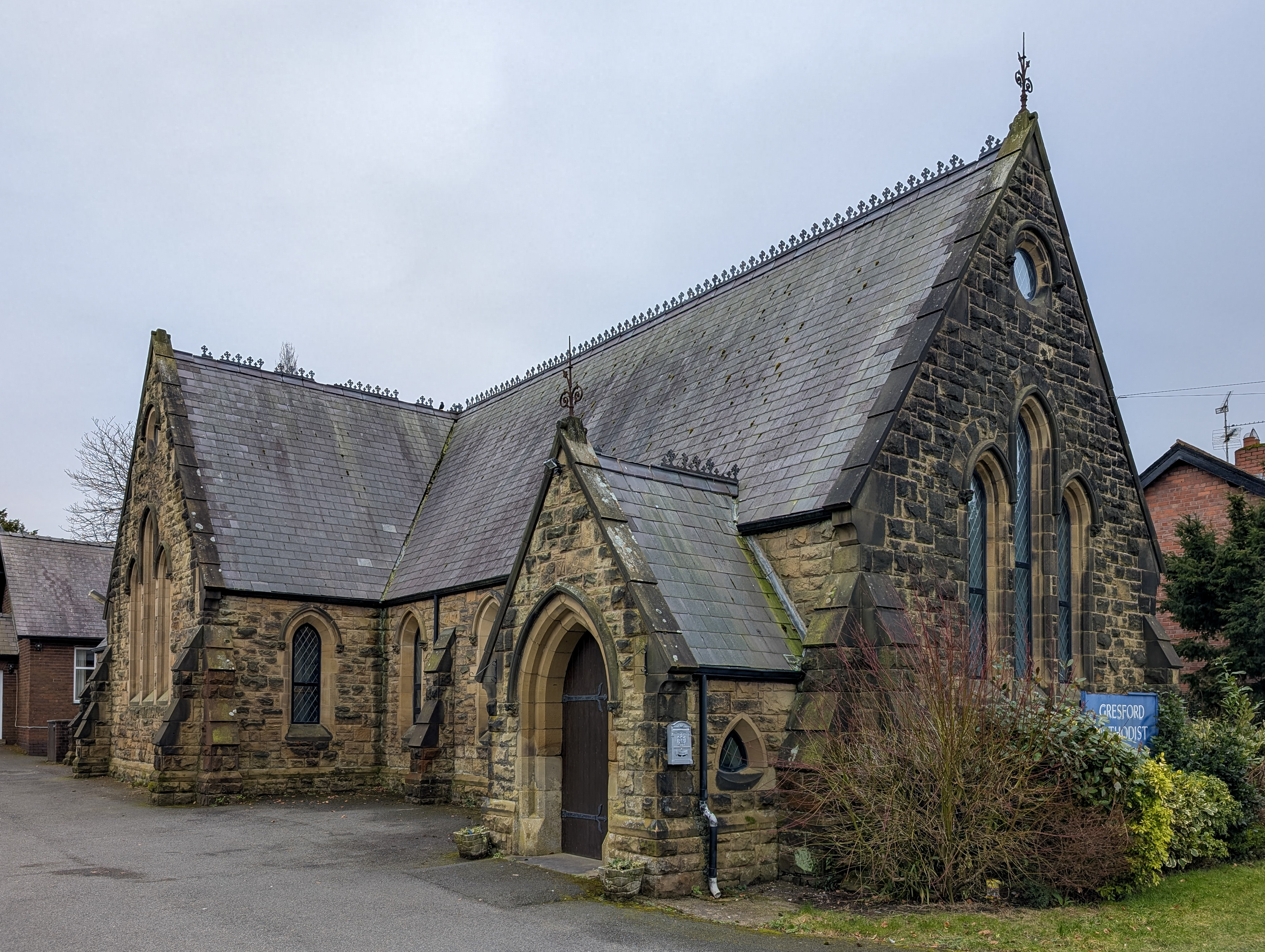
- Gresford Methodist Church, Chester Road, Gresford
- Gresford Methodist Church
- 53.087757°N 2.964942°W
- Location: Chester Road, Gresford
- Country: Wales
- Denomination: Methodist (originally Wesleyan Methodist)

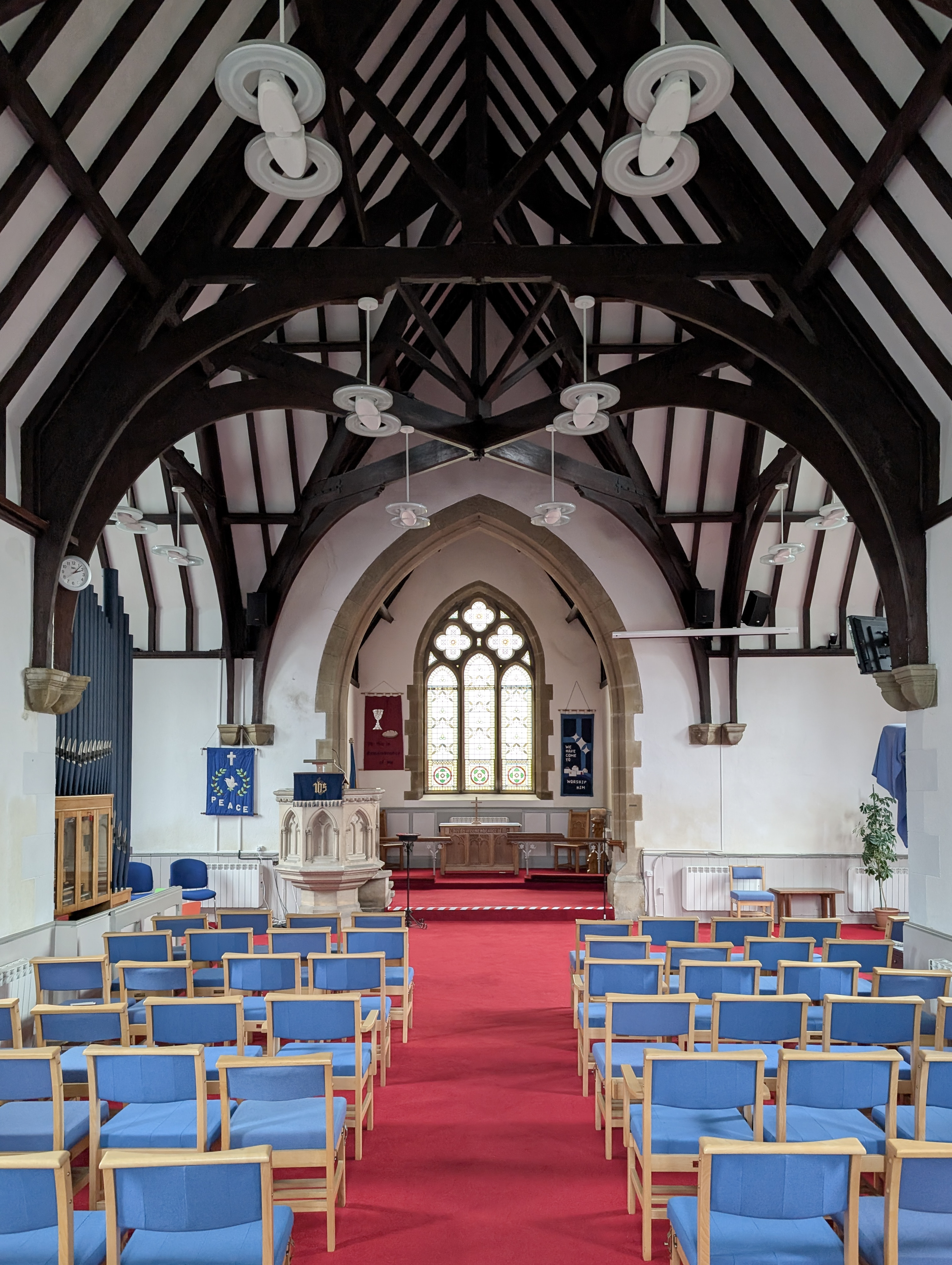
Interior of the church

The Gresford Methodist Church, historically known as the Gresford Wesleyan Methodist Church, is a church on Chester Road in Gresford, Wrexham County Borough, Wales. The Wesleyan Methodist Church held its first service in 1879, and was built as a replacement for the Pant Methodist Chapel, located on Turnpike Lane in Gresford. It remains a place of worship.

== Foundation ==
The Pant Methodist Chapel, Turnpike Lane, Pant, Gresford was established build in 1822 and ceased to be used after the opening its replacement, the Gresford Methodist Church, Chester Road, Gresford in 1879.

The Gresford Methodist Church, Chester Road, Gresford was funded by donations, a grant from the Methodist Extension Fund, and a loan without interest from the Connexional Chapel Buildings Committee.

The architect was Mr A.C. Baugh of Temple Row, Wrexham, and the contracted builder was Mr. Rogers from Rossett. The initial plans for the building anticipated the need for it to hold a congregation of 240 people, however, initially 120 pine seats were planned to be placed in the nave. The description of the church in the plans was:

"The roof will be open and of pitch pine, and covered with Carnarvon slates and red ornamental cresting, the height from the floor line to the wall plate being 12 feet and to the apex of the roof 28 feet 6 inches".

The ceremony to lay the foundation stone at the Church took place at 2.30pm on Wednesday 13 November 1878. The celebrants were Reverend G.H. Barker, Reverend F. Payne, Reverend J.M. Bamford, and Reverend Thomas McCullagh.

Mr Tilston, a Church trustee, placed a hermetically sealed bottle under the foundation stone containing, copies two local newspapers, the Wrexham Advertiser and the Wrexham Guardian, the preaching plan for the Wrexham Circuit, the names of the trustees, officers, architect, and builders, and a photograph of the Queen.

The foundation stone was laid by Reverend Thomas McCullagh in his capacity as the Chairman of the Liverpool Circuit.

During the foundation event a further £220 was donated towards continuing the building of the Church.

The first service in the Church was on Tuesday 15 July 1879

A description of the Church in 1879 stated:

"The style is that of early English, but the external features, though plain, are effective. The chapel consists of a nave, 56ft 6 in by 20ft, transepts, 42ft. by 20ft., and chancel 15ft. by 14ft. By the side is a vestry 10ft. 6 in. by 10ft. The main entrance is by a porch at the side, with an outer door of massive oak with ornamental hinges of wrought iron, and with inner folding doors of varnished pitch pine. The building is constructed of local stone supplied by Mr. W. Griffiths, of Brynteg Quarry, and the outer walls are executed in random course with dressings of similar stone, and supported by buttresses, between which are the lancet-shaped windows. The gables have three lancet windows, the centre one ascending above the others. The only tracery which has been introduced is in the chancel window, which is of a simple but effective design. The glass is of the lolled cathedral type, of a greenish tint, except that in the chancel window, which is of various colours. The roofs are of pitch pine stained and varnished, and open to the ridge with principals to each bay, Raving curved piers from the collar beam, which rest on stone corbals. The seats, low and open, are of pitch pine simply varnished, the ends and backs being framed and panelled with moulded cappings. On the corner of the chancel is a Bath stone pulpit which is the gift of the builder. It is octagonal, with cut sides and moulded and curved cappings. Hanging from the centre of the roof of the transepts is a small but a very chaste brass corona, supplied by Mr. John Gittins, iron- monger, Wrexham, and this with side brackets will light the chapel, the gas being obtained from an Alpha gas making apparatus, supplied by Mr. H. L. Muller, Anne-street, Birmingham. The plastering of the interior is in rough stucco, and the roof between the rafters is set in white. The communion rail is of oak on standards of ornamental wrought iron, neatly decorated. The aisles and chancel are paved with Minton tiles, set diagonally with a neat border, the colour being chocolate and black. The ventilation is obtained by hopper ventilators in the windows with an outlets in the gables, by means of circular lights, which open on a swivel, and the test on Tuesday, which was a severe one, proved the ventilation to be satisfactory. The chapel will be heated by gas... pulpit have been executed by Messrs. Hughes and Owen, of Wrexham; and the glazing by Messrs. Forrest, of Liverpool."

== Refurbishment ==
A two-year refurbishment programme was completed in 2003. The work included toilets with disabled access, replacement windows in the church, and improvements to the vestry. In 2015, most of the pews were removed and replaced with chairs. The heating was changed to electric heaters and the church was carpeted. The church lighting was changed to remove the fluorescent lighting to double the lighting level and provided a better spread of light. In 2018, the church was further refurbished following a flood. The alterations received a commendation from the Wrexham Area Civic Society.

== Current use ==
Gresford Wesleyan Methodist Church is now known as the Gresford Methodist Church. It remains an active place of worship, as part of the Wrexham Circuit and Wales Synod of the Methodist Church. BBC Radio Wales broadcast a service titled 'Coping with Pressure' conducted by Reverend Richard Parkes from the church on 14 July 2019.

There is a church hall in the grounds that is used by a variety of local organisations for their meetings and events.
