= Robert Saint =

British composer and animal welfare activist (1905-1950)

- Saint in 1936
- Born: 20 November 1905; Hebburn, South Tyneside, United Kingdom
- Died: 15 December 1950 (age 45); Hebburn, South Tyneside, United Kingdom
- Occupation(s): Composer, musician, and animal welfare activist
- Years active: 1933-1950

Robert "Bob" Saint (20 November 1905 – 15 December 1950) was a British composer, musician and animal welfare activist from Hebburn, South Tyneside, best known for his 1930s brass band composition "Gresford", about the Gresford disaster and known as "The Miners' Hymn". Saint was also a significant campaigner for animal welfare, particularly of pit ponies.

== Biography ==
Born on 20 November 1905, Saint came from a family of miners, including his father, whom he joined working in an accident-prone mine at Hebburn at the age of 14 after leaving school. While working there, he campaigned for lower hours and better treatment of pit ponies, small horses used in mines during the time period. Saint was employed as a "putter", working the carts around the mine until its closure in 1932. This left him unemployed in the era of the Great Depression, though Saint also earned money by giving music lessons and performing in a dance orchestra. He also formed his own band, the Kensington Dance Orchestra, which he led on saxophone.

When Saint learned of the Gresford disaster in 1934, it had a lasting impression on him. In response, he composed "Gresford", which biographer Robert Colls described as a tune "[giving] mining communities something to say at the end". The next year, he joined the Royal Northumberland Fusiliers as an army bandsman, playing the trombone. Saint's composition for the Gresford disaster was first performed publicly in 1938, during the Durham Miners' Gala. All of the royalties he gained from "Gresford" were donated to the National Union of Mineworkers.

Saint was discharged from service for medical reasons in 1939, and took up a brief job as a labourmen in a shipyard. In 1940, he met a representative for a charity known as The National Equine (and Smaller Animals) Defence League. Relating his own experiences campaigning for pit ponies, Saint became an inspector for the League and drove an animal ambulance by 1946. He eventually became a regional organizer for the group. After his initial recruitment, the League gave Saint an animal refuge, which was simply a shed in his backyard with kennels and veterinary equipment. Saint became known to locals as "the poor people's vet", and would humanely euthanize sick and dying pets upon request, free of charge. Saint spoke at local schools, encouraging children to be kind to animals and promoting an Animals' Guardians club.

In 1948, the League bought a five-acre farm for Saint, comprising a large home, stables, and other outbuildings. Saint was known as a unique individual in the area, and kept ponies in his home parlor at the farm. Peter Crookston, writing about Saint's life in The Pitmen's Requiem, suspected that Saint and the League had a private "falling out" somewhere between 1949 and 1950, based on financial reports and the fact that they provided no obituary for him in their 1951 annual report.

== Personal life and death ==
Saint was married to Doris Taylor, and had two sons, Ronnie and Stanley. He died of heart failure, asthma and chronic bronchitis on 15 December 1950. Saint was a heavy smoker of Woodbine cigarettes on top of suffering from chronic industrial disease, contributing to his death at the age of 45.
