= Bradley, Wrexham =

Coordinates: 53.0786°N 3.0089°W

Bradley: Welsh: Bradle
- Village
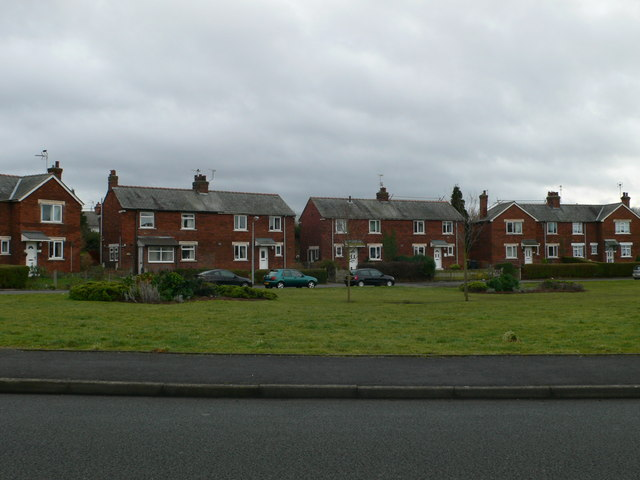
- Heol-y-Parc, Bradley

- Location within Wrexham
- OS grid reference: SJ316537
- Community: Gwersyllt
- Principal area: Wrexham
- Preserved county: Clwyd
- Country: Wales
- Sovereign state: United Kingdom
- Post town: WREXHAM
- Postcode district: LL11
- Dialling code: 01978
- Police: North Wales
- Fire: North Wales
- Ambulance: Welsh
- UK Parliament: Wrexham
- Senedd Cymru – Welsh Parliament: Wrexham

Bradley (Welsh: Bradle) is a village in Wrexham County Borough, Wales. Situated in the community of Gwersyllt, it is bounded by Alyn Waters Country Park to the north, the village of Gwersyllt to the west and south, and Bradley Hill, Wat's Dyke and the River Alyn to the east. The Bradley Built-up Area Sub-division (BUASD) is a subdivision of the Wrexham Built-up Area.

The village is home to a cricket club, village hall, and a Toyota dealership at Lindop. Until 2009, there was also a Post Office and a Pub known as the "Queens Head", the latter being replaced with a housing estate.

Prior to the building of the 'Old Mill Estate' the village housing stock consisted primarily of Council houses. There are ruins of six mill cottages and part of the Bradley Wire Mill to the east of the village on the banks of the River Alyn.

Bradley Park Rangers F.C. was a football club in the village between 1951 and 1965.
