= Bradley Park Rangers F.C. =

Former association football club in Wales

Bradley Rangers F.C. was an association football team based in the village of Bradley, Wrexham, Wales. They played their home games at Glanllyn Road, now the site of the "Old Mill" housing estate.

The club was founded in 1951 and joined the Third Division of the Welsh National League (Wrexham Area) for the 1952–53 season. In that first season they topped the division undefeated scoring 128 goals in 22 games and amassing 44 points The following season they were champions of the Second Division scoring 149 goals in 28 games, amassing 43 points.

The Rangers were promoted to the First Division and continued to play in this league even after they changed their name to Bradley Social Club F.C. for the 1961–2 season, before finally dissolving in 1965.
