= Llay =

Village in Wales

Llay: Welsh: Llai
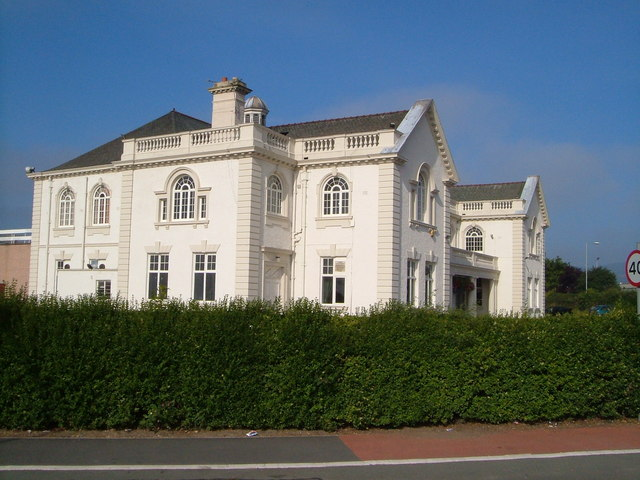
- The Miners' Welfare Institute, the largest such building in the country at completion in 1931

- Location within Wrexham
- Population: 4,814 (2011 Census)
- OS grid reference: SJ334561
- Community: Llay
- Principal area: Wrexham
- Preserved county: Clwyd
- Country: Wales
- Sovereign state: United Kingdom
- Post town: WREXHAM
- Postcode district: LL12
- Dialling code: 01978
- Police: North Wales
- Fire: North Wales
- Ambulance: Welsh
- UK Parliament: Wrexham
- Senedd Cymru – Welsh Parliament: Wrexham
- List of places UK Wales Wrexham 53.098°N 2.995°W Map of the community

Llay (Welsh: Llai [ɬai̯]; meaning meadow; Welsh pronunciation) is a village and community in Wrexham County Borough, Wales.

It borders several other villages including Gwersyllt and Gresford. At the 2001 Census, the total population of the community of Llay, including Llay village, was 4,905, reducing to 4,814 at the 2011 Census.

Prior to the 1960s, Llay was a coal mining village. Llay Main Colliery, at one time the largest colliery in Wales and after 1952 the deepest pit in the UK, was a major employer for the area before its coal reserves were exhausted in 1966.

== History ==
Llay first appears in mediaeval records as a hamlet - a small settlement without a church - of the township and manor of Burton. It later formed an outlying part of the parish of Gresford, but the relatively late growth of the village is shown by the fact that the first church service was not held there until 1916, and its church was not completed until 1925. Llay was eventually made a separate parish in its own right in 1944.

In the 1920s, Llay was transformed from a small rural hamlet, into a mining community to support the Llay Main Colliery. At this time around 450 houses were built as part of the “model village” - a structured approach that aimed to provide miners and their families with quality housing and essential facilities. Using successful examples such as Port Sunlight and Bournville as templates/models, the layout of the village was carefully designed. However, due to economic restrictions and the lifecycle of the mine, the grander vision for a town of 30,000 people did not materialise; with only a portion of the originally planned housing actually completed.

Much of the growth of the village is connected with the development of coal mines, particularly the Llay Main Colliery. It was first established by the industrialist Sir Arthur Markham in 1913, but sinking of the shafts was interrupted by the First World War and by Markham's death in 1916. The shafts were eventually completed in 1921, and coal production started in 1923. The colliery had a reputation as a well-run, modern pit with a relatively satisfied workforce, and by the 1930s was employing more than 3,000 men, 450 families being installed in new housing schemes in Llay.

== Today ==
There is a country park in Llay called Alyn Waters country park, which has a sister country park in Gwersyllt of the same name. The site includes a children's play park and pathways for pedestrian and cycle access through the forest. There were numerous original artworks around the park such as carved wooden animals along the paths, however many of the artworks have now been stolen or destroyed. There is a small golfing range at the park, and other sporting events take place on the large playing fields, such as football (home of Llay United Youth Football Club) and archery.

There are four churches in the village of Llay; the Roman Catholic St. Francis of Assisi, Llay Community Church of the Nazarene, St. Martin of Tours of the Church in Wales and the Bethel Baptist Church.

There are three drinking establishments, which are the Royal British Legion club, the Crown public house and Llay Miners' Welfare, also known as Miners' Welfare Institute. The Welfare had its grand opening in 1931 after negotiations in 1929 for monies to build a Miners' Institute with sports facilities. The Welfare was refurbished in 2005 after receiving a grant for the work.

There is an industrial estate in Llay, being similar in size to the whole village itself, which it includes a Sharp Electronics factory.

The Llay Resource Centre was opened in 2005 by Chris Armstrong. The Resource Centre features a library, cafe, youth club and runs various courses and groups for the local community.

== Notable residents ==
- Chris Armstrong - former Wrexham, Tottenham Hotspur, Crystal Palace and England B Team professional footballer, was brought up by his adoptive parents in the village after being born in Newcastle upon Tyne.
- Terry Hennessey - former Welsh International professional footballer who played for Derby County in the 1970s. Later migrated to Australia.
- Mark Hughes - former Manchester City Manager and former Welsh International and Manchester United professional footballer, lived in the village until age four.
- Steve O'Shaughnessy - former professional footballer who played for Leeds United, Bradford City, Rochdale and captained Darlington
- Dennis Taylor - 1985 World Snooker Championship winner and BBC snooker commentator.
