= All Saints' Church, Gresford =

Church in Gresford, north Wales

Coordinates: 53.088°N 2.9773°W

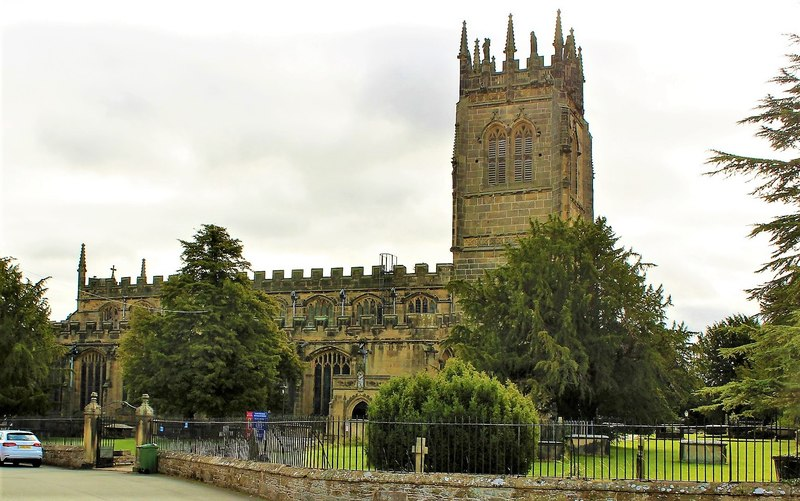
All Saints' Church

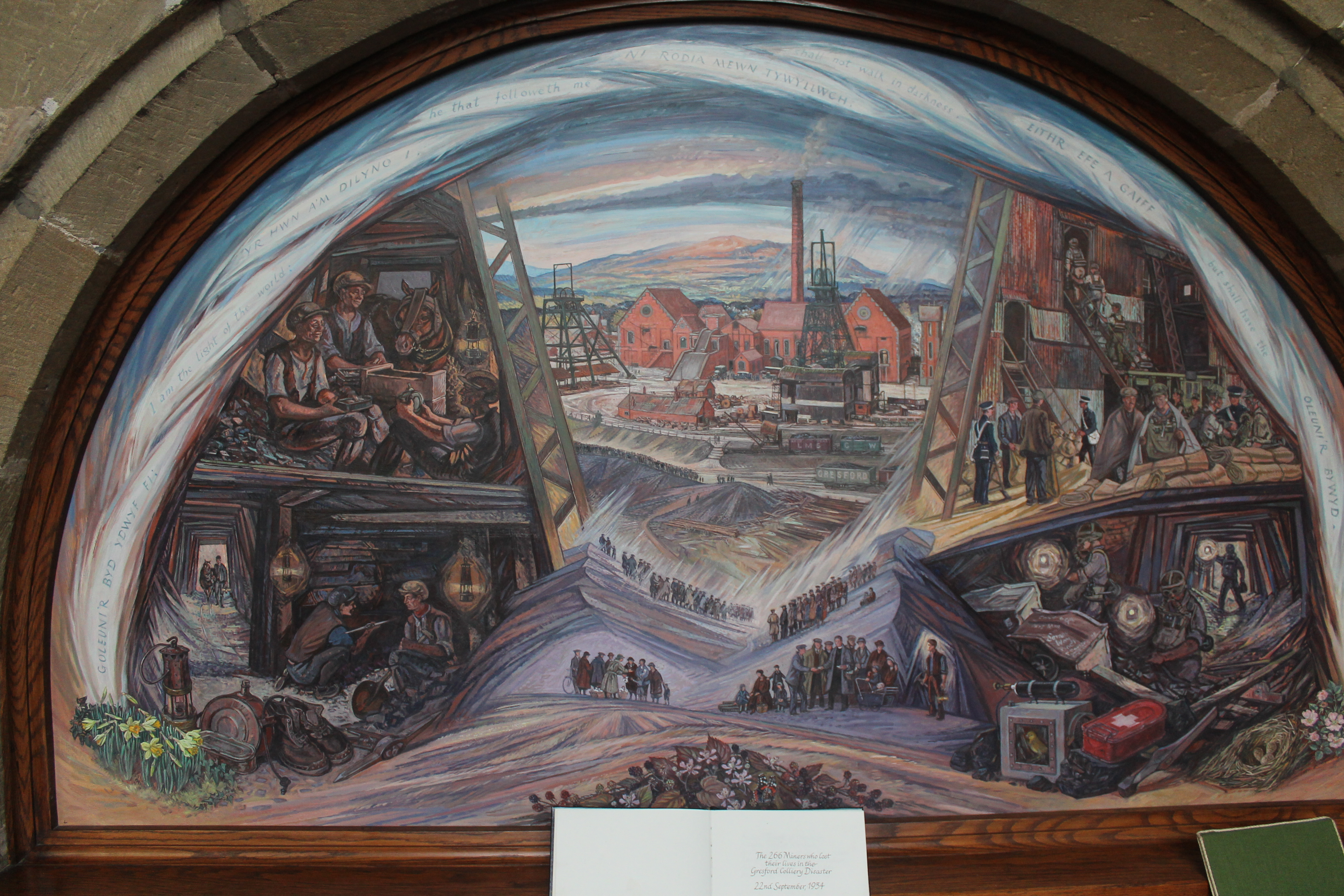
Painting in the church commemorating the Gresford disaster of 1934, above a book with the names of the 266 who died.

All Saints' Church (Welsh: Eglwys yr Holl Saint) stands in the former coal mining village of Gresford in Wrexham County Borough, Wales. It is a large, mainly late 15th-century church in a slightly red sandstone, in many ways more typical of nearby Cheshire churches. It has been described as the finest parish church in Wales, and has the most surviving medieval stained glass of any Welsh church.

The bells of the parish church of All Saints are one of the traditional Seven Wonders of Wales. Not only are the peal of bells of note, listed it is said for the purity of their tone, but the church itself is remarkable for its size, beauty, interior church monuments, and its churchyard yew trees. The bells are commemorated in an anonymous rhyme:

Pistyll Rhaeadr and Wrexham steeple,
Snowdon's mountain without its people,
Overton yew trees, St Winefride wells,
Llangollen bridge and Gresford bells.

The church was designated as a Grade I listed building on 7 June 1963, as "an exceptional example of a late-medieval church with fine medieval glass and furnishings".

== Description ==
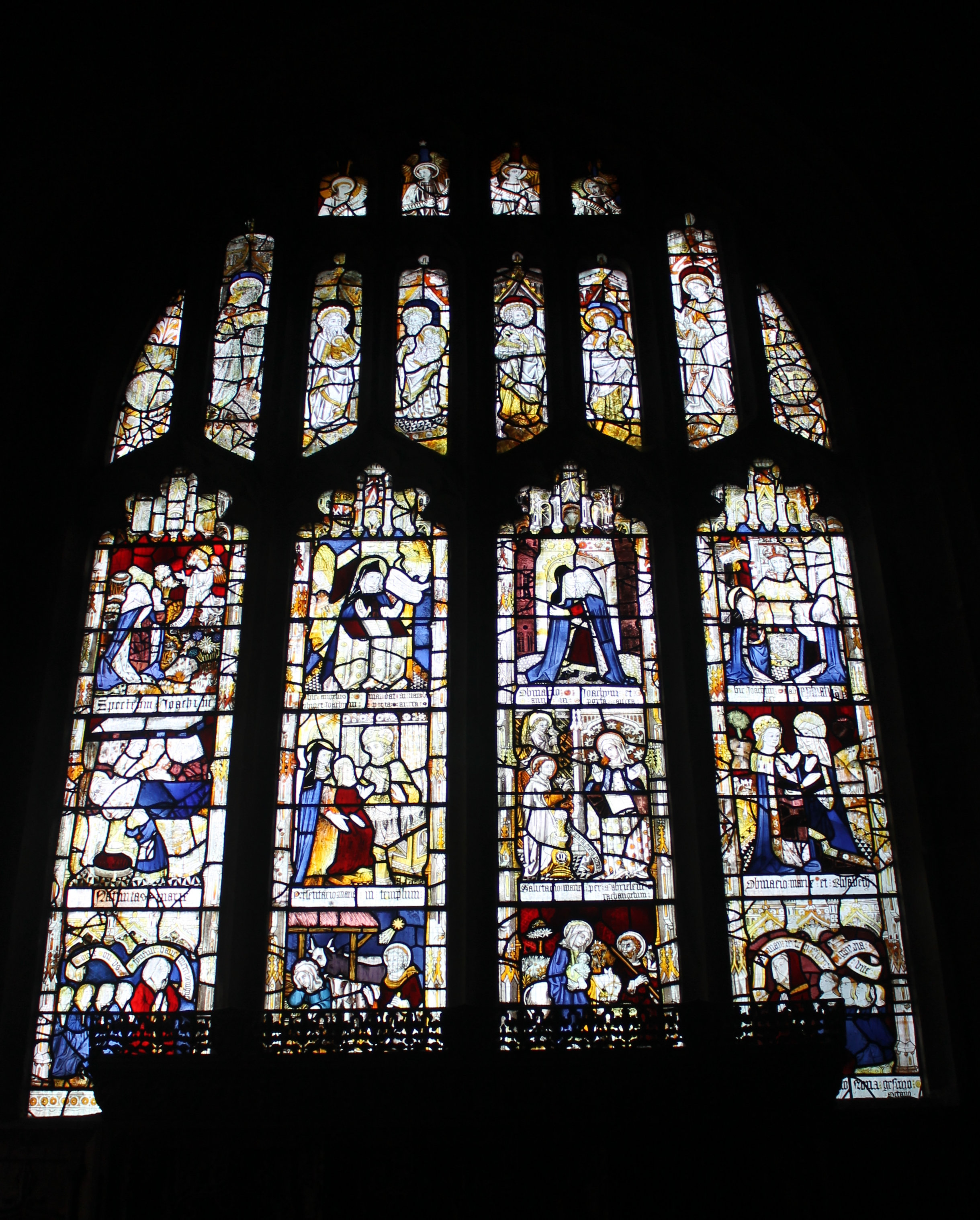
Life of the Virgin window in the Lady Chapel.

Though a church was built in the late 13th century by the Welsh patron Trahaearn ap Ithel ap Eunydd (and his five brothers), this was possibly not the first building on the site. The Domesday Book of 1086 records a church at "Gretford in Extan hundred", but this might be elsewhere around the village. The present building was very largely constructed at the end of the 15th century. The church is remarkably large and well-fitted out for what was a small settlement, suggesting (as do some documentary hints) that there was a profitable place of pilgrimage there, though no evidence for what the attraction was remains - probably a relic or statue, perhaps of the Virgin Mary The medieval parish was very large, over 30 square miles.

Robert Parfew, the Bishop of Saint Asaph, wrote to Thomas Cromwell when he was Henry VIII's chief minister, requesting that he be allowed to move his seat to Gresford, as "the Church of the said parish was strongly and beautifully made erect and builded, as also all manner of ornaments and other necessaries requisite for the replenishing and furniture of the same were brought and provided and the inhabitants of the ...parish ... were not a little aided and succoured towards the better sustentation of the living", perhaps referring to the pilgrimage receipts.

The church has much fine late medieval stained glass of around 1500, now collected at the east end, except for small figures in the top of the tracery of some aisle windows. Some glass has been claimed to have come from the dissolved abbey at Basingwerk on the banks of the River Dee below Holywell. The church was also richly endowed by Thomas Stanley, 1st Earl of Derby, whose intervention at the Battle of Bosworth helped the Welsh-born Henry Tudor overcome Richard III in his successful quest for the throne of England. He paid for the large central east window, which survives almost complete; this reflects the dedication of the church with a host of figures of saints. A window with the Life of the Virgin in several scenes in the Lady Chapel is largely intact.

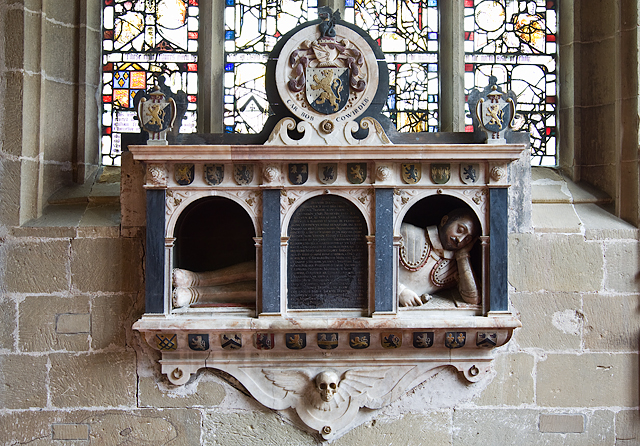
Memorial effigy of Sion Trefor (d. 1589)

There are very fine memorials, mostly for the local Trevalyn Hall branch of the powerful North Welsh Trevor (Trefor) family. An alabaster effigy of Sion Trefor (d. 1589) reclines within a classical framework, a long tablet inscribed in Welsh appearing to hide the middle of his body. His daughter-in-law, "Dame Katherine Trevor" is represented twice, once painted and half life-size, kneeling next to her husband Sir Richard Trefor (d. 1638), and also kneeling with daughters in a smaller relief.

The twelve misericords date from the late 15th or early 16th century. Some of these are very evocative, such as "A Devil, erect, driven by a man or woman in long kilted garment, facing left, and, pushing two women on a sledge or barrow into the jaws of Hell. Left Supporter an ape with a urine flask. Right Supporter a fox with a bucket of excrement".

== Bells ==
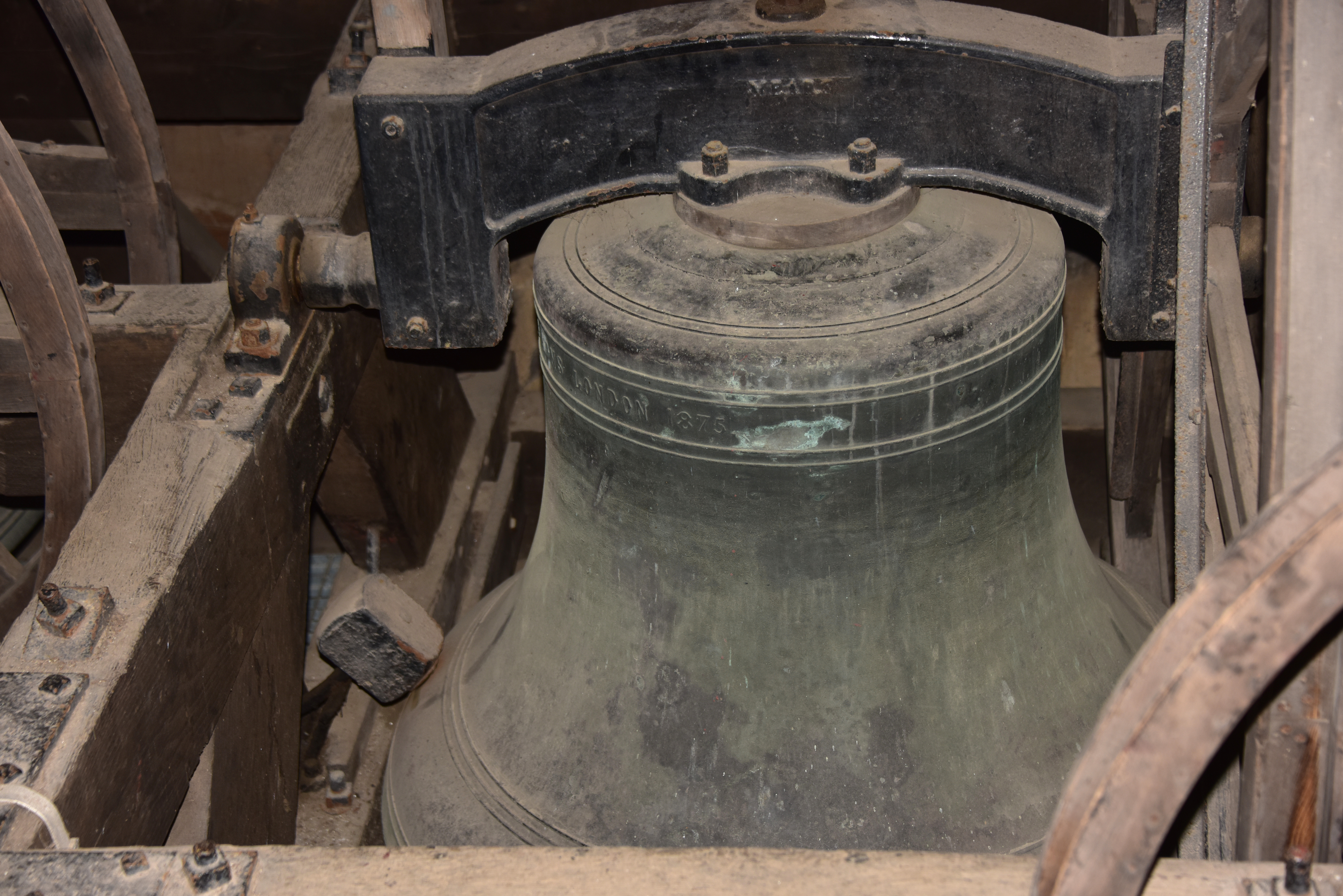
One of the Gresford bells

The earliest record of the peal of Gresford bells dates back only to 1714. An apparatus was installed in the belfry in 1877 so that all eight bells could be chimed by one person. The bells are rung regularly for church services, and the old custom of ringing on 5 November is still continued, though it is unclear whether this is to commemorate the successful landing of William of Orange in 1688, or the Gunpowder Plot of Guy Fawkes to blow up Parliament in 1605. During World War II, the custom of tolling the passing bell was discontinued, as the bells were to be rung only as an invasion warning. There have been modern replacements for some.

== Romano-British altar ==
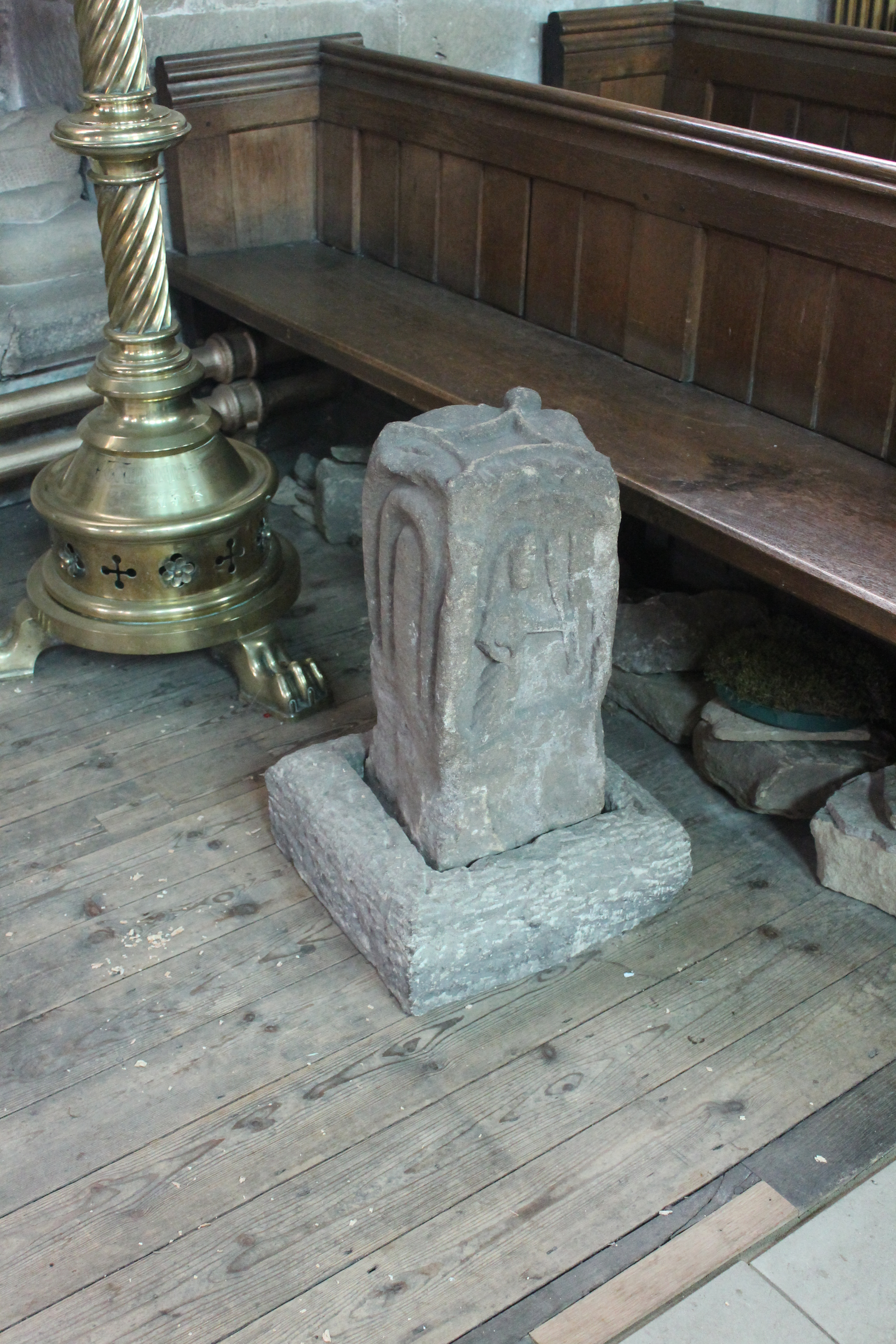
The Romano-British altar stone

Inside the impressive church, one of the most remarkable finds was discovered in 1907 by workmen, the Gresford Stone. This is a Roman period altar that was hidden for centuries, being used as a stone block in the rebuilding of the medieval church. The altar has four carved sides and a decorative depression at the top, used for the placement of offerings to the goddess Nemesis depicted on one side. The altar was probably part of a Romano British shrine dating back to 100 to 350 AD.

== Yews ==
The church is surrounded by a grove of yews, some of which are equal in size and age to those of Overton listed in the Seven Wonders of Wales. Twenty-five of these were planted in 1726, but one growing near the south gate is older. It was already an ancient tree at the time of Richard II's proclamation that ordered the general planting of yews to support the army and the use of yew in the Longbow.

The churchyard also contains the war graves of six Commonwealth service personnel of World War I.

== See also ==
- List of church restorations, amendments and furniture by John Douglas
