= Henry Walker (mines inspector) =

British Chief Inspector of Mines & English rugby union player

Sir Henry Walker
- Born: 17 March 1873; Saltburn-by-the-Sea, Yorkshire, England
- Died: 3 August 1954 (aged 71); Worplesdon, Surrey, England
- Occupation: Mine engineer
- Known for: Chief Inspector of Mines
- Spouse: Susan Carson
- Children: 2 sons

Sir Henry Walker CBE (17 March 1873 – 3 August 1954) was the Chief Inspector of Mines for Great Britain in the 1930s, most notable for leading the enquiry into the Gresford Colliery Disaster of 1934. In his younger days he was a rugby player of some note playing at county level and representing the Barbarians.

== Personal history ==
Walker was born in Saltburn-by-the-Sea, Yorkshire in 1873 to William Walker, a mines' engineer, and his wife Margaret. The 1881 census records Walker at the age of eight now living in Guisborough along with his parents and five siblings. He was educated at Durham School. He served his time as a mining engineer at Bearpark Colliery, Durham and later gained his certificate of competence as a manager. In 1902, following posts as manager of ironstone mines in East Cleveland, North Yorkshire, he was appointed Assistant Inspector of Mines, initially in the Southern district, moving in 1905 to the Durham district. In 1910 he was promoted to Senior Inspector for the Midland and Southern district, before being made Divisional Inspector for Scotland in 1915. In 1920 he became the Deputy Chief Inspector of Mines and was also recognised by the Crown when he was made Commander of the Order of the British Empire. In 1924 he replaced Sir Thomas Mottram as the Chief Inspector of Mines for Great Britain. In the 1928 Birthday Honours Walker was knighted and in 1937 he was made an Officer of the Venerable Order of Saint John.

In his role as Deputy and Chief Mines Inspector, Walker was involved in the inquiries of some of the worst mining disasters of the period, these included the Medomsley cage fall in 1923, the Glamorgan Colliery explosion in Llwynypia in 1932 and the 1934 Gresford disaster in Wrexham. Walker is particularly remembered for the controversial outcome of his 1937 inquiry into the Gresford disaster, which saw 266 men killed in an underground explosion. Although Walker was critical of the mine owners to the state of part of the mines in his report debated in the House of Commons, he failed to find fault in the area where the explosion happened. In his inquiry he found the mine's management only guilty of inadequate record keeping. Walker was succeeded in his role as Government's Chief Inspector of Mines in 1938 by Frederick Horton Wynne. Following his retirement he was appointed as a chairman on a government committee to look at the problem of the suppression of dust in mines.

He was regarded by mine owners as a firm and impartial administrator of mining laws and regulations, and by management as a knowledgeable assessor of mining practices. He was also respected by leaders of the miners’ unions.

== Rugby career ==
Although never representing his country, Walker played at all national levels of rugby union. He first played as a schoolboy for Durham School, and continued to represent the school as an Old Dunelmians. He played amateur rugby for Yorkshire County (1900–1901) and Durham (1903–1908). In the 1897–98 season he accepted an invitation to join British touring team, Barbarian F.C., playing a single match against Percy Park.

== Family life ==
Walker married Susan Carson in 1909 and they had two sons, she died in 1953. Walker died 3 August 1954 at his home at Worplesdon in Surrey aged 81. His elder brother (Sir) William Walker (c.1864-1930) was Chief Inspector of Mines in 1919–20.

== Notes ==
Preceded by Sir Thomas Mottram	Chief Inspector of Mines; 1924–1938	Succeeded by Frederick Horton Wynne
