= Horseman's Green =

Village in Wales

Coordinates: 52.965°N 2.827°W

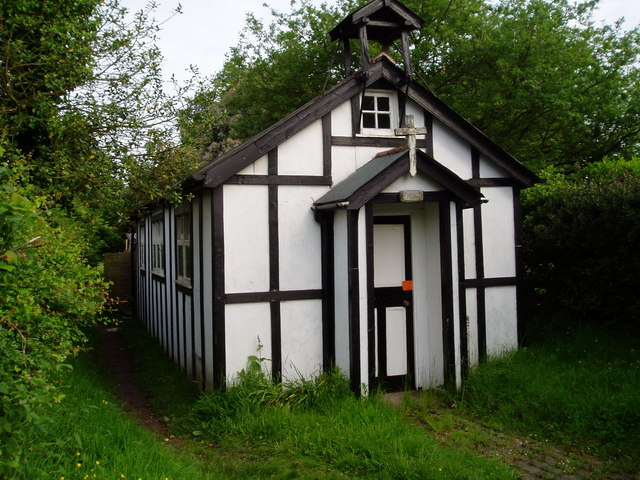
- The former Mission Room at Horseman's Green

- Location within Wrexham
- OS grid reference: SJ445411
- Community: Hanmer
- Principal area: Wrexham
- Preserved county: Clwyd
- Country: Wales
- Sovereign state: United Kingdom
- Post town: WHITCHURCH
- Postcode district: SY13
- Dialling code: 01948
- Police: North Wales
- Fire: North Wales
- Ambulance: Welsh
- UK Parliament: Clwyd South
- Senedd Cymru – Welsh Parliament: Clwyd South

Horseman's Green is a village in Wrexham County Borough, Wales. Located in the rural southeast of the county borough, it is close to the Wales-England border, in the community of Hanmer, the village is also simply called the Green.

A small hamlet outside the village is known as Little Arowry (to distinguish it from the nearby village of Arowry).

== History ==
Horseman's Green is one of a number of villages in the Maelor Saesneg containing the element "Green" in their names, indicating that they came into existence in relatively modern times with the enclosure of former common land. The name Horseman's Green is first recorded at the very end of the 17th century in the form "Horse Math's Green", likely derived from the obsolete dialect word "math", meaning "a mowing" (i.e. meadow land).

Most notable for its proximity to Hanmer (the birthplace of Lorna Sage and the setting for the autobiography Bad Blood), the village was also an evacuation area in the Second World War. The neighbouring village of Penley is well known for its Polish residents and hospital, which still housed Polish war evacuees until very recent years. Horseman's Green was used less commonly by those looking to avoid Nazi German Luftwaffe bombing raids from the Crosby area of Liverpool.

== Important buildings ==
- Hanmer First Scout Group
- Newhaven House
- Ferncliffe House (Built 1890)
- Oak Villa
