= Halghton Hall =

Grade I listed house in Wrexham County Borough, Wales

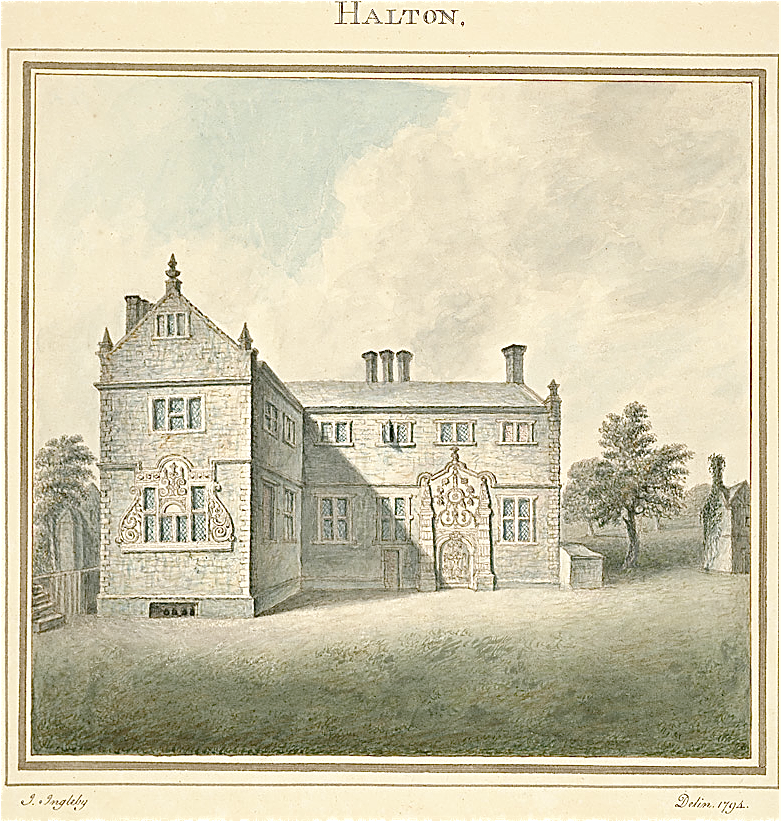
- a late-18th century engraving - the hall has been little altered since

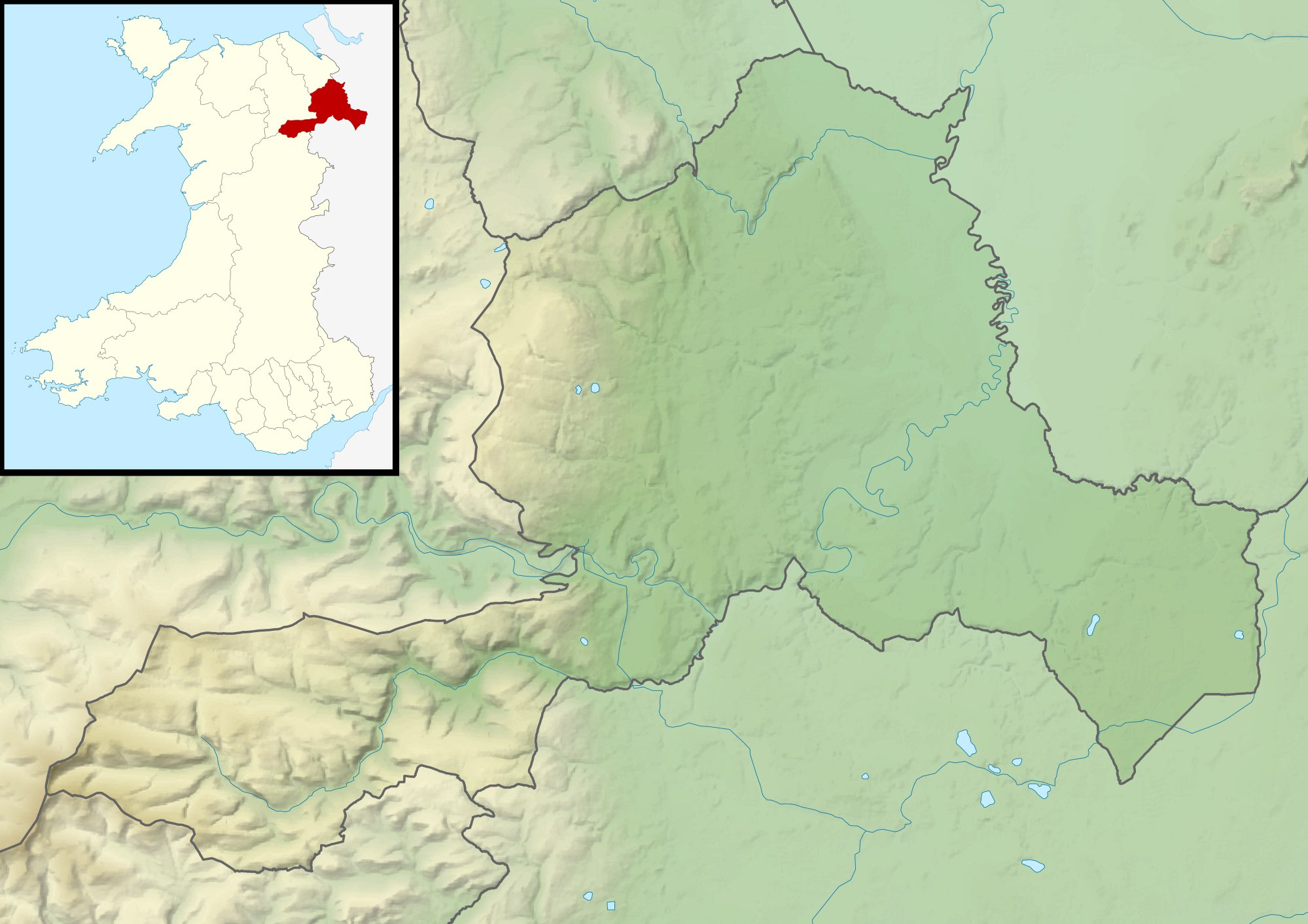
- Location within Wrexham
- 52.976°N 2.8717°W
- Type: House
- Location: Halghton, Wrexham County Borough

History
- Built: 1662, with earlier origins

Site notes
- Architectural style: Jacobean
- Owner: Privately owned

Listed Building – Grade I
- Official name: Halghton Hall
- Designated: 17 March 1953
- Reference no.: 1641

Listed Building – Grade II
- Official name: Multi-purpose farm building at Halghton Lodge
- Designated: 15 November 2005
- Reference no.: 86945

Listed Building – Grade II
- Official name: Halghton Lodge Farmhouse
- Designated: 15 November 2005
- Reference no.: 86939

Listed Building – Grade II
- Official name: Halghton Forge
- Designated: 15 November 2005
- Reference no.: 86938

Scheduled monument
- Official name: Halghton Lodge Moated Site
- Designated: 3 July 1987
- Reference no.: FL174

Halghton Hall is a house in the hamlet of Halghton in Wrexham County Borough, North Wales. Designed in around 1662 in a Jacobean style, it is a Grade I listed building. Various former estate buildings have their own historic listings.

== History ==
Evidence of human habitation at Halghton dates from the Middle Ages. To the north of the present hall is the site of a Medieval moated manor house, although nothing but the platform and the moat now remain. Halghton Hall dates from 1662 and is thought to have been built by a cadet branch of the Hanmer family of Hanmer, Flintshire. By the 18th century the hall had descended to the status of a farmhouse, and formed part of the estate of Lieutenant Colonel Philip Lloyd Fletcher, commander of the Royal Flint Rifles. It was later sold to the Kenyon family, local landowners.

The hall was sold again in the mid-20th century and remains privately owned, the centre of an agricultural estate. It is not open to the public.

== Architecture and description ==
Halghton was intended to be built to a traditional h-plan, with a central block and two cross wings. The eastern section does not now exist, and it is likely that it was never built. Edward Hubbard, in his Clwyd volume in the Pevsner Buildings of Wales series, suggests that it was not, and Cadw also thinks this probable, although it raises the possibility that the eastern section was constructed and later removed. (Note: At the time of the Cadw listing in 1953, the then owners reported finding evidence of the foundations of an eastern wing.) The house is built of brick with ashlar dressings. Hubbard describes the "very large" off-set porch as "crudely Jacobean in style". A partial moat remains.

Halghton is a Grade I listed building. A lodge, a farm building and a forge are all listed at Grade II. The site of the moated Medieval manor is a Scheduled monument.

== Sources ==
- Hubbard, Edward (2003). Clwyd (Denbighshire and Flintshire). The Buildings of Wales. New Haven and London: Yale University Press. ISBN 978-0-300-09627-9. OCLC 315792534.
