= List of works by Thomas Harrison =

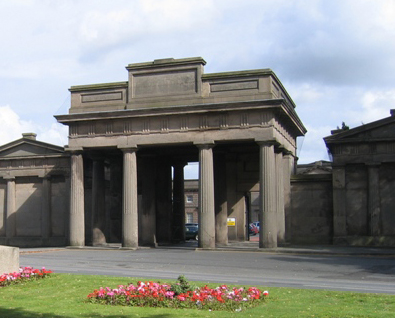
Propyleum (gateway) of Chester Castle in Harrison's Greek Revival style

Thomas Harrison (7 August (baptised) 1744 – 29 March 1829) was an English architect who flourished during the last two decades of the 18th century and the first three decades of the 19th century. Little is known of his early life, and his precise date of birth is uncertain. He was born in Richmond, North Yorkshire, and was baptised on 7 August 1744. In 1769 he was sent to study architecture in Rome. He began his professional career as an architect in 1782, following his success in a competition to design Skerton Bridge in Lancaster, Lancashire, after which he moved to Lancaster.

While living there, he carried out a number of projects, including a new tower and spire for St John's Church, a clock tower for the town hall, and new buildings within the complex of Lancaster Castle. During his work on Lancaster Castle, he was also involved in designing new buildings within Chester Castle, Cheshire. In 1795 Harrison moved with his family to Chester, where he spent the remainder of his career.

Following his success with Skerton Bridge, Harrison designed additional bridges, including Harrington Bridge in Derbyshire, St Mary's Bridge in Derby, Stramongate Bridge in Kendal, Cumbria, and smaller bridges in Lancashire and Cheshire.

Harrison is considered to have been a leader of Greek Revival architecture in the northwest of England. His major surviving works in this style include the Lyceum in Liverpool, the Portico Library in Manchester, and the Commercial Newsroom in Chester. Most of Harrison's works are in Lancashire and Cheshire, but he also designed buildings in North Wales, and in Shropshire. His only work away from this part of the country was his design for the New Buildings at Magdalen College, Oxford. In Chester, Harrison designed a house for himself, St Martin's Lodge. In addition to domestic and civic buildings, he worked on memorial structures, including the Jubilee Tower on Moel Famau in North Wales, Lord Hill's Column in Shrewsbury, Shropshire, and a memorial gateway in Holyhead, Anglesey. His final major designs were for two bridges in Chester. In 1825–26 he widened the Old Dee Bridge. He then designed a new bridge, the Grosvenor Bridge. This was not completed until after his death in 1829, but it was at the time the largest structure of its type in the world.

== Key ==
Grade	Criteria
I	Buildings of exceptional interest.
II*	Particularly important buildings of more than special interest.
II	Buildings of special interest.
Category (Scotland)	Criteria
Category A	Buildings of national or international importance, either architectural or historic, or fine little-altered examples of some particular period, style or building type.
Category B	Buildings of regional or more than local importance, or major examples of some particular period, style or building type which may have been altered.
Category C(S)	Buildings of local importance, lesser examples of any period, style, or building type, as originally constructed or moderately altered; and simple traditional buildings which group well with others in categories A and B.
"—" denotes a work that is not graded.

== Works ==
Name	Location	Photograph	Date	Notes	Grade
Old Town Hall	Lancaster, Lancashire; 54.0489°N 2.8018°W		1782	Added the clock tower. Now Lancaster City Museum.	II*
St John's Church	Lancaster, Lancashire; 54.0545°N 2.7966°W		1783–84	Added the west tower and spire.	II*
Skerton Bridge	Lancaster, Lancashire; 54.0545°N 2.7966°W		1783–1787	A new bridge crossing the River Lune costing £14,000 (equivalent to £1,900,000 in 2025). It was the first large public bridge in England to have a flat road deck.	II*
Bridge Houses	Lancaster, Lancashire; 54.0540°N 2.7948°W	—	1786–87	Built as a toll house and as houses for renting opposite Skerton Bridge.	II*
County Gaol	Lancaster, Lancashire; 54.0499°N 2.8056°W	—	1788–1796	Built within Lancaster Castle. Included the Keeper's House, the Female Felons' Prison, and the Male Felons' Prison.	I
Harrington Bridge	Sawley, Derbyshire; 52.8754°N 1.3012°W		1789–90	A new bridge over the River Trent to replace a ferry. It was severely damaged by a flood in 1904 and only small portions of it remains.	II
St Mary's Bridge	Derby, Derbyshire; 52.9272°N 1.4752°W		1789–1794	Replacing a medieval bridge. It has a flat road deck carried on three arches.	II*
Chester Castle	Chester, Cheshire; 53.1858°N 2.8918°W		1789–1802	The earliest building was the county gaol on a site sloping down to the River Dee. It has been largely demolished and was replaced by Cheshire County Hall. At about the same time the Shire Hall was built and still functions as a criminal court.	I
Entrance screen	Chester Road, Wrexham, Wales; 53.0595°N 2.9901°W	—	c. 1790	Attributed to Harrison; an entrance screen to the now-demolished Acton Park.	II
Springfield Hall	Lancaster, Lancashire; 54.0421°N 2.7992°W	—	1790–1792	A large suburban villa, almost certainly by Harrison. Demolished in 1862. The Centenary Building of the Royal Lancaster Infirmary now stands on the site. If by Harrison, it was his earliest house.	—
Stramongate Bridge	Kendal, Cumbria; 54.3300°N 2.7418°W		1791–1797	Rebuilding of a medieval bridge. It is a scheduled monument.	—
Greycourt	Lancaster, Lancashire; 54.0504°N 2.8044°W		c. 1792	Attributed to Harrison, a house built for Richard Postlethwaite.	II
Cocker Bridge	Cockerham, Lancashire; 53.9524°N 2.8388°W	—	1793	Since replaced by a pair of sluice gates.	—
Mill House Bridge	Pilling, Lancashire; 53.9440°N 2.8651°W	—	1793	Little more than a culvert, it carries the A588 road.	—
Denny Beck Bridge	Halton, Lancashire; 54.0718°N 2.7604°W	—	1793	Carries the A683 road over the Denny Beck.	—
Mausoleum	Gosford House, East Lothian, Scotland; 56.0001°N 2.8743°W	—	1793	Almost certainly by Harrison, for Francis Charteris, 7th Earl of Wemyss.	A
Kennet House	Kennet, Clackmannanshire, Scotland; 56.0977°N 3.7408°W	—	1793–94	Built for Robert Bruce. It was Harrison's first major house design. Demolished in March 1967.	—
Quernmore Park Hall	Quernmore, Lancashire; 54.0585°N 2.7400°W	—	1795–1798	Almost certainly by Harrison; a new country house for Charles Gibson.	II*
Chain Lodge	Quernmore, Lancashire; 54.0743°N 2.7458°W	—	1795–1798	A lodge to Quernmore Park Hall; almost certainly by Harrison.	II
Broomhall House	Limekilns, Fife, Scotland; 56.0372°N 3.4833°W	—	1795–1799	Extended and re-modelled an 18th-century house for Thomas Bruce, 7th Earl of Elgin.	A
Lancaster Castle	Lancaster, Lancashire; 54.0499°N 2.8056°W	—	1796–1798	Reconstruction, including the Shire Hall and Crown Court.	I
Lyceum	Liverpool, Merseyside; 53.4044°N 2.9806°W		1800–1802	Built as a gentlemen's club, with a library and a newsroom, at a cost of £11,000 (equivalent to £930,000 in 2025). Later a post office.	II*
Lymford Bridge	Bosley, Cheshire; 53.1829°N 2.1329°W		c. 1800	Bridge over the River Dane.	II
Oversley Ford Bridge	Wilmslow, Cheshire; 53.3426°N 2.2777°W		c. 1800	Bridge carrying the A538 road over the River Bollin.	—
Radnor Bridge	Congleton, Cheshire; 53.1826°N 2.2555°W	—	c. 1800	Bridge carrying Chelford Road over the River Dane.	—
House of Correction	Middlewich, Cheshire	—	1801	Repairs to the building on Queen Street, which has since been demolished.	—
Colinton House	Edinburgh, Scotland; 55.9119°N 3.2556°W	—	1801–1806	Adapted from plans drawn up by Harrison for Sir William Forbes. More recently part of Merchiston Castle School.	A
Portico Library	Manchester; 53.4797°N 2.2404°W		1803–1806	Built at a cost of about £6,800 (equivalent to £530,000 in 2025).	II*
St Peter's Church	Chester, Cheshire; 53.1904°N 2.8918°W		1804	Refacing the stonework of the south face after timber lean-to buildings had been demolished.	I
Chester Castle	Chester, Cheshire; 53.1858°N 2.8918°W		1804–1815	Further buildings including an armoury on the west side of the parade ground, barracks (later a museum) on the east side, and a propylaea or gateway (pictured).	I
St John the Baptist's Church	Whittington, Shropshire; 52.8747°N 3.0026°W		1805–06	Replacement of nave and porches after storm damage. The nave is wider than the previous nave, the work costing about £1,500 (equivalent to £120,000 in 2025). It has since been altered.	II
Theatre Royal	Manchester	—	1806–07	Built at a cost of about £12,000 (equivalent to £950,000 in 2025), it could seat 1,020 people. It was destroyed by fire in 1844.	—
City Gaol and House of Correction	Chester, Cheshire; 53.1910°N 2.8974°W	—	1806–1808	Built to replace the old gaol at Northgate, costing about £3,500 (equivalent to £270,000 in 2025). It has been demolished, and the site is now occupied by the Queen's School.	—
Exchange	Manchester; 53.4828°N 2.2449°W	—	1806–09	Replacing an earlier exchange, it provided a meeting place for merchants, including a newsroom, a library, a dining room, and a post office. It was enlarged in 1849, and replaced in 1874.	—
Commercial Newsroom	Chester, Cheshire; 53.1906°N 2.8916°W		1807–08	Gentlemen's club costing about £2,700 (equivalent to £210,000 in 2025).	II
Gredington	Hanmer, Wrexham, Wales; 52.9422°N 2.8259°W	—	1807–1811	Harrison enlarged and remodelled the rear of this country house for the 2nd Lord Kenyon at a cost of £6,675 (equivalent to £470,000 in 2025). The house was demolished in 1978, and a new house has been built on the site.	—
Northgate	Chester, Cheshire; 53.1938°N 2.8934°W		1808–1810	Rebuilding of the northern entrance to the city.	I
Tabley House	Tabley Inferior, Cheshire		1808–1810	Creation of a picture gallery on the first floor of the house for Sir John Fleming Leicester.	I
Oughtrington Hall	Oughtrington, Cheshire; 53.3787°N 2.4595°W	—	c. 1810	Almost certainly designed by Harrison. It was a country house built for Trafford Trafford. The house has been incorporated into the buildings of Lymm High School.	II
Glan-yr-Afon	Llanferres, Denbighshire, Wales; 53.1474°N 3.2073°W	—	c. 1810–1812	A country house for Henry Potts of Chester. Almost certainly designed by Harrison.	II
Jubilee Tower	Moel Famau, Flintshire, Wales; 53.1544°N 3.2560°W		1810–1813	Built on the highest point of the Clwydian Range to commemorate the Golden Jubilee of George III. The foundation stone was laid in 1810, but construction did not start until 1813, and it was never fully completed. It was in the form of an Egyptian obelisk. In 1862 the obelisk collapsed. The remains were consolidated into a viewing platform in 1970.	II
Denbighshire Infirmary	Denbigh, Wales; 53.1859°N 3.4099°W	—	1810–1813	Built to replace a dispensary of 1807. It has been extended several times.	—
Wesleyan Methodist Church	St John Street, Chester, Cheshire; 53.1898°N 2.8880°W		1811	Harrison designed the exterior, and William Cole the interior. The church was extended and re-orientated in 1906.	II
Church of Our Lady and St Nicholas	Liverpool, Merseyside; 53.4070°N 2.9948°W		1811–1815	A new tower and lantern after the previous steeple had collapsed in 1810. It cost over £22,000 (equivalent to £520,000 in 2025), and rises to a height of 120 feet (36.6 m).	II
Woodbank	Stockport, Greater Manchester; 53.4100°N 2.1311°W		1812–1814	Villa for Peter Marsland, a local industrialist. Later a museum, then offices. Harrison almost certainly also designed the entrance screen.	II*
Mersey Bridge	Warrington, Cheshire; 53.3858°N 2.5913°W	—	1813–1817	A timber bridge carrying what is now the A49 road over the River Mersey. It replaced a medieval structure at a cost of £3,000 (equivalent to £220,000 in 2025). It was itself replaced in 1837 by a stone bridge.	—
Dee Hills House	Chester, Cheshire; 53.1918°N 2.8767°W	—	1814	Built as a country house, later used as offices.	II
Chapel of West Hall	High Legh, Cheshire; 53.3531°N 2.4518°W	—	1814	Built with an Ionic front, replacing a ruined chapel dating from 1408. Burnt down in 1891, and the remaining fragments were incorporated into St John's Church.	—
Lord Hill's Column	Shrewsbury, Shropshire; 52.7042°N 2.7318°W		1814–1816	Harrison made modifications mainly to the pedestal of the structure that had been designed by Edward Haycock.	II*
Allerton (Grove House)	Liverpool, Merseyside; 53.3726°N 2.8873°W	—	1815	Built as a house for Jacob Fletcher. The grounds have been used as a municipal golf course since 1921. The house has been seriously damaged by fire and is in ruins, other than its northwest part, which is used as the golf club house.	II
Cranage Bridge	Holmes Chapel, Cheshire; 53.2064°N 2.3643°W	—	1815–16	A timber bridge carrying what is now the A50 road over the River Dane. It was later replaced by a bridge in stone.	—
Dorfold Hall	Acton, Cheshire; 53.0685°N 2.5451°W		1816	The interior of the east wing was remodelled.	I
Marquess of Anglesey's Column	Llanfairpwyll, Anglesey; 53.2208°N 4.1967°W		1816–17	A column in Greek Revival Doric style to commemorate the achievements of Henry Paget, 1st Marquess of Anglesey in the Napoleonic Wars.	II*
St Paul's Church	Liverpool, Merseyside	—	1818	A domed ceiling for the church, which originally dated from 1763–79. It closed in 1901, and has since been demolished.	—
Chester Cathedral	Chester, Cheshire; 53.1919°N 2.8905°W		1818–1820	Harrison was the first architect to be involved in the 19th-century restoration of the cathedral. His work included rebuilding the front of the central south transept.	I
Watergate House	Chester, Cheshire; 53.1894°N 2.8962°W		1820	Built as a town house for Henry Potts, Clerk of the Peace for the County of Cheshire. It later became the headquarters of Western Command, then the headquarters of the Cheshire Community Council. It has since been used as offices.	II*
Exchange	Chester, Cheshire	—	c. 1820	Harrison made internal alterations. The exchange burnt down in 1862.	—
Hoole Hall	Chester, Cheshire; 53.2063°N 2.8545°W	—	c. 1820	Harrison designed a cast iron veranda and conservatory.	II
Chirk Castle	Chirk, Wrexham, Wales; 52.9352°N 3.0893°W		c. 1820	Harrison made alterations to the east wing.	I
Hardwick Grange	Hadnall, Shropshire; 52.7880°N 2.7049°W	—	1821	Alterations made for Rowland Hill, 1st Viscount Hill, at a cost of £4,911 (equivalent to £470,000 in 2025). It was later extended, but demolished in 1931. Harrison's entrance lodge survives and is listed at Grade II.	II
New Buildings, Magdalen College	Oxford; 51.7530°N 1.2459°W	—	1821–1824	Alterations to the buildings of 1733.	I
Tilstone Lodge	Tilstone Fearnall, Cheshire; 53.1448°N 2.6461°W	—	1821–1825	A country house built for Admiral John Richard Delap Halliday, (later Tollemache).	II
St Martin's Lodge	Chester, Cheshire; 53.1919°N 2.8905°W	—	1822–23	A villa built by Harrison for his own use. It has since been used for various purposes, including as a parsonage, and as an administrative office for the police.	II
Admiralty Arch	Holyhead, Anglesey, Wales; 53.3142°N 4.6247°W		1822–1824	Built to commemorate the landing of George IV in 1821.	II*
The Citadel	Hawkstone Park, Shropshire; 52.8525°N 2.6384°W		1824–25	Built for Rowland Hill, 1st Viscount Hill as a dower house. Later a hotel.	II*
Old Dee Bridge	Chester, Cheshire; 53.1855°N 2.8887°W		1825–26	Medieval bridge widened by the addition of a footway on the east side, and new arches.	I
Grosvenor Bridge	Chester, Cheshire; 53.1836°N 2.8961°W		1827–1833	Harrison designed the bridge as an alternative crossing of the River Dee to the Old Dee Bridge. He resigned before it was finished, and its completion was supervised by his pupil William Cole. At the time it was built it was the largest structure of its type in the world. Its span of 200 feet (61 m) is still the longest masonry arch in Britain.	I
