= Woodbank, Stockport =

Listed building in Greater Manchester, England

Woodbank
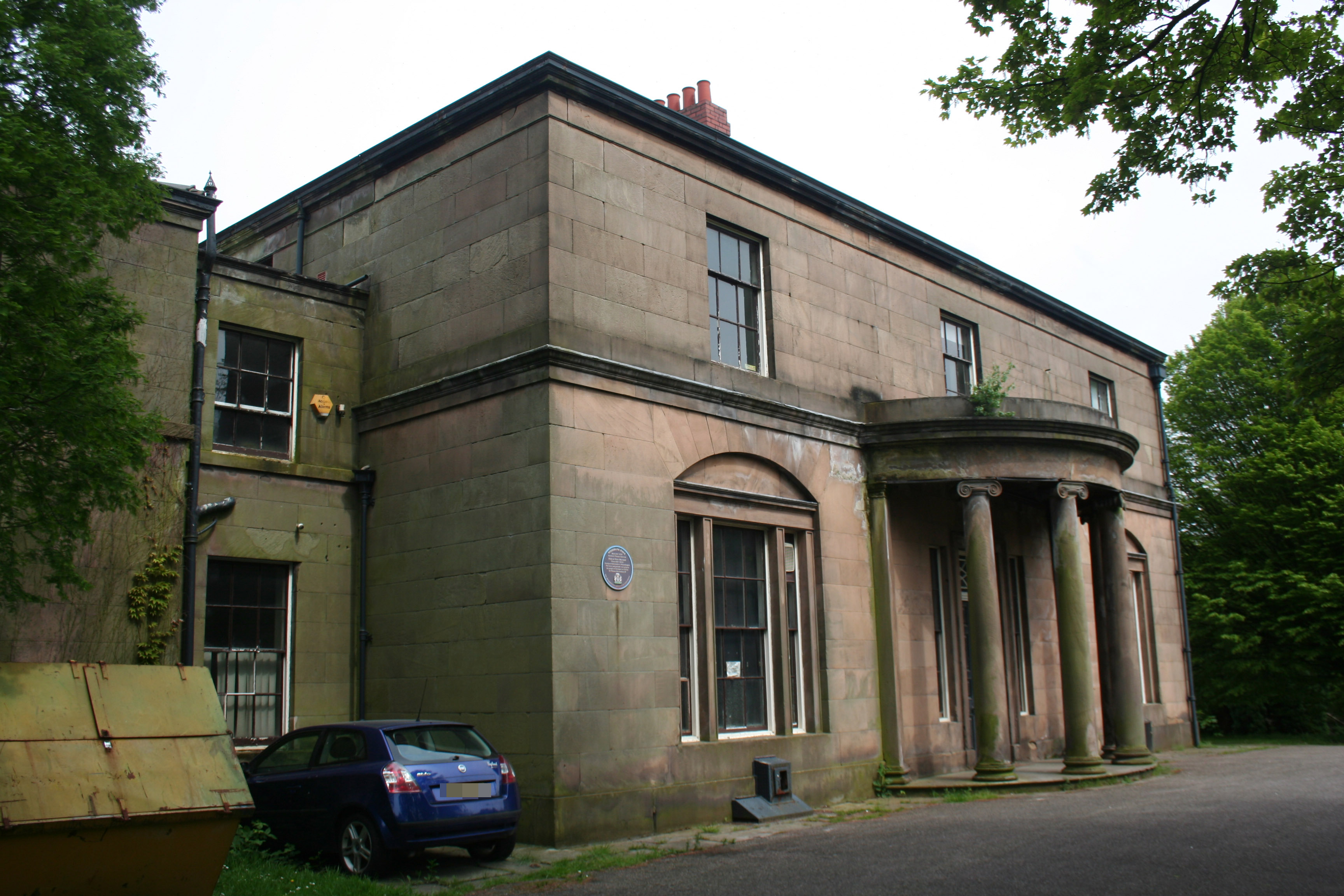
- The building in 2014

- Location within Greater Manchester

General information
- Architectural style: Greek Revival
- Location: Woodbank Memorial Park, Stockport, Greater Manchester, England
- Coordinates: 53.41001°N 2.13112°W
- Construction started: 1812
- Completed: 1814
- Client: Peter Marsland

Design and construction
- Architect: Thomas Harrison

Listed Building – Grade II*
- Official name: Woodbank Villa and entrance portico
- Designated: 10 March 1975
- Reference no.: 1162994

Woodbank is a Grade II* listed early 19th‑century villa in Stockport, Greater Manchester, England, set within Woodbank Memorial Park. Built between 1812 and 1814 to a Greek Revival design by Thomas Harrison for the industrialist Peter Marsland, it later served as a museum, art gallery and council offices. Donated to the borough in 1924, the building has since fallen vacant and is now on Historic England's Heritage at Risk Register.

== History ==
The villa was built between 1812 and 1814 by Thomas Harrison in the Greek Revival style for Peter Marsland, a prominent industrialist in the Stockport area. Woodbank was used as a museum and art gallery at one time.

In 1924 Woodbank Villa was donated to the County Borough of Stockport. The surrounding park, east of Vernon Park and covering approximately 49 acres (20 ha), had been gifted to the council following the First World War and is now known as Woodbank Memorial Park.

On 10 March 1975, Woodbank Villa was designated a Grade II* listed building. It was used as council offices before being left vacant in 2009; a developer made plans to convert the hall into apartments in 2021, though the proposals were not taken forward. In December 2023, Stockport Metropolitan Borough Council (SMBC) stated that they had allocated £250,000 to "address the decline of the historic hall", with asbestos removal having been completed before further works which include the demolition of modern outbuildings. As of 2025, Woodbank Villa is on Historic England's Heritage at Risk Register, its condition classed as "very bad", with an "immediate risk of further rapid deterioration or loss of fabric."

== Gallery ==
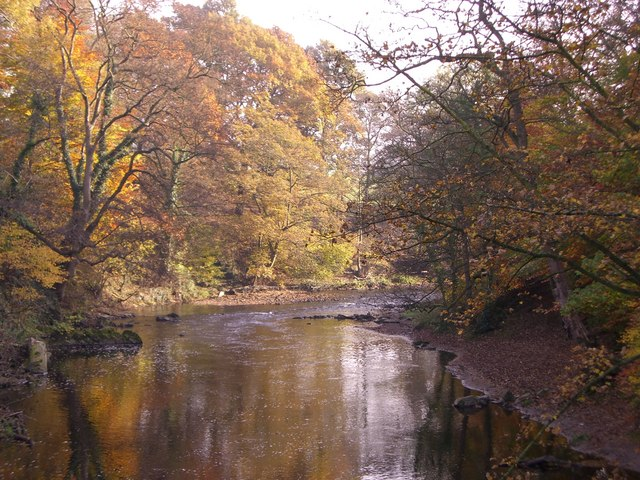
The River Goyt at Woodbank Park in 2007

== See also ==
- Grade II* listed buildings in Greater Manchester
- List of works by Thomas Harrison
- Listed buildings in Stockport
