= Old Dee Bridge =

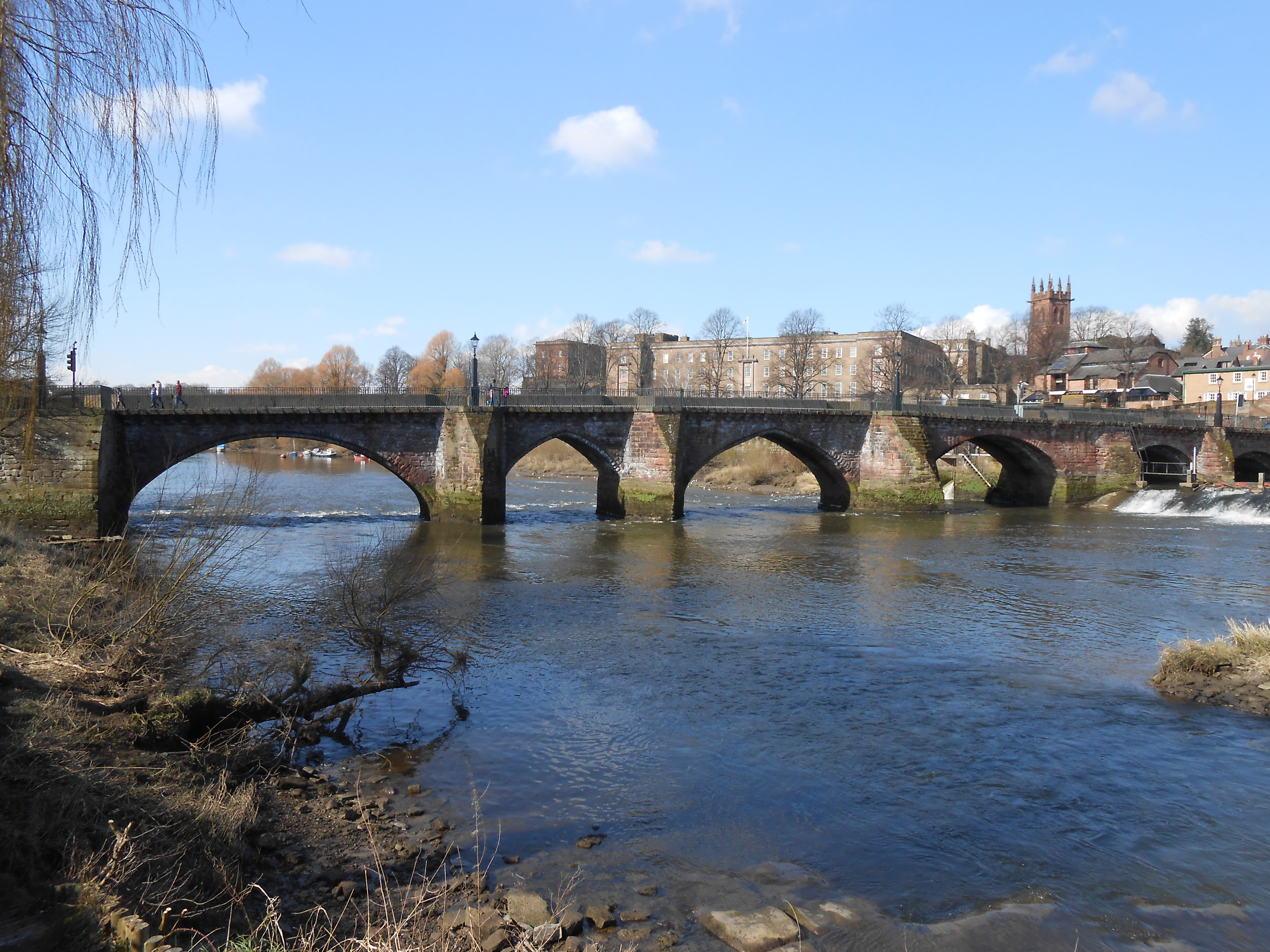
- Old Dee Bridge
- Coordinates: 53.185506°N 2.888718°W
- Carries: Bridge Street (vehicles and pedestrians)
- Crosses: River Dee
- Locale: Chester, Cheshire, England
- Heritage status: Grade I

Characteristics
- Design: Arch bridge
- Material: Sandstone
- No. of spans: 7

Statistics
- Toll: None

The Old Dee Bridge in Chester, Cheshire, England, is the oldest bridge in the city. It crosses the River Dee carrying the road that leads from the bottom of Lower Bridge Street and the Bridgegate to Handbridge. A bridge on this site was first built in the Roman era, and the present bridge is largely the result of a major rebuilding in 1387. It is recorded in the National Heritage List for England as a designated Grade I listed building, and is a scheduled monument.

== History ==
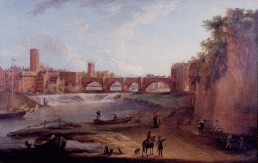
Old Dee Bridge circa 1765–80, in a painting attributed to Edmund Garvey

The original bridge was built for the Romans and probably had stone piers carrying a timber carriageway. This seems to have disappeared by the 10th century, as in the reign of Queen Æthelflæd of Mercia (AD 911–918) there was only a ferry.

A bridge had been built by 1086, when the Domesday Book records that the Provost of Chester Castle could summon a man from every hide of land in Cheshire to rebuild Chester's walls and bridge. The bridge was reached by a causeway, which according to a manuscript in the Harleian Collection was built for Hugh d'Avranches, 1st Earl of Chester (died 1101) along with watermills on the Dee at that point.

The bridge was repaired in the next two centuries but in 1279–80 the timber superstructure was swept away. Further repairs were made by Sir Thomas de Ferrers, Justice of Chester in about 1347–49 and by Stephen de Merton in the 1350s.

In 1357 Edward, the Black Prince ordered the mayor and citizens of Chester to make:

...with all speed their part of the bridge of Dee... in the same manner and style as the remainder of the bridge which has been newly made.

It is likely that this rebuilding resulted in the bridge that exists today. In 1367 the citizens of Chester were granted murage (the toll for repair of the town walls) but all profits went "to the fabric and for the repair of the bridge". In December 1388 a grant of pontage was made to the "mayor, bailiffs and good men of Chester" for a period of three years.

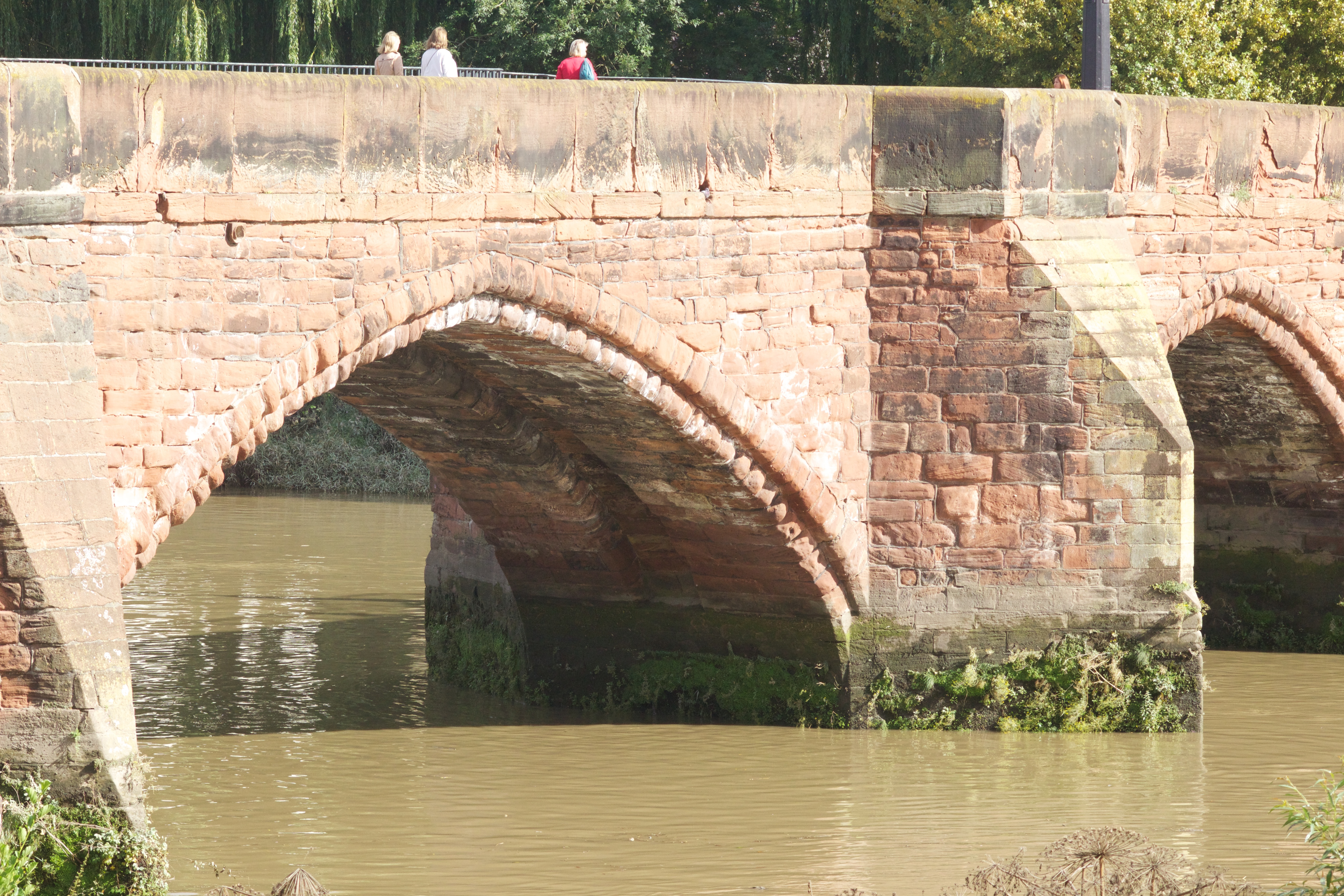
One of the pointed arches

The bridge is built in local red sandstone. It has seven arches, all of which are of different dimensions. The two northernmost arches formerly spanned the leat leading to the mills. The southernmost arch replaced the medieval drawbridge.

A tower was built on the bridge between 1399 and 1407, as part of the city's defences. In 1407 a moiety (i.e. half) of the murage was allowed to complete the tower gatehouse on the bridge.

The gatehouse was demolished in 1781. In 1825–26 the bridge was widened by Thomas Harrison to provide a footway on the upstream side. Around this time it was decided that it was becoming inadequate for the expected traffic and it was decided to build an additional bridge to link the city with North Wales. The result was the Grosvenor Bridge, designed by Thomas Harrison and officially opened in 1832 although it was not finished for traffic to cross it until 1 January 1834.

== See also ==
- Grade I listed buildings in Cheshire West and Chester
- List of works by Thomas Harrison
