= Halghton =

Coordinates: 52.964188°N 2.846966°W

Halghton: Welsh: Halchdyn
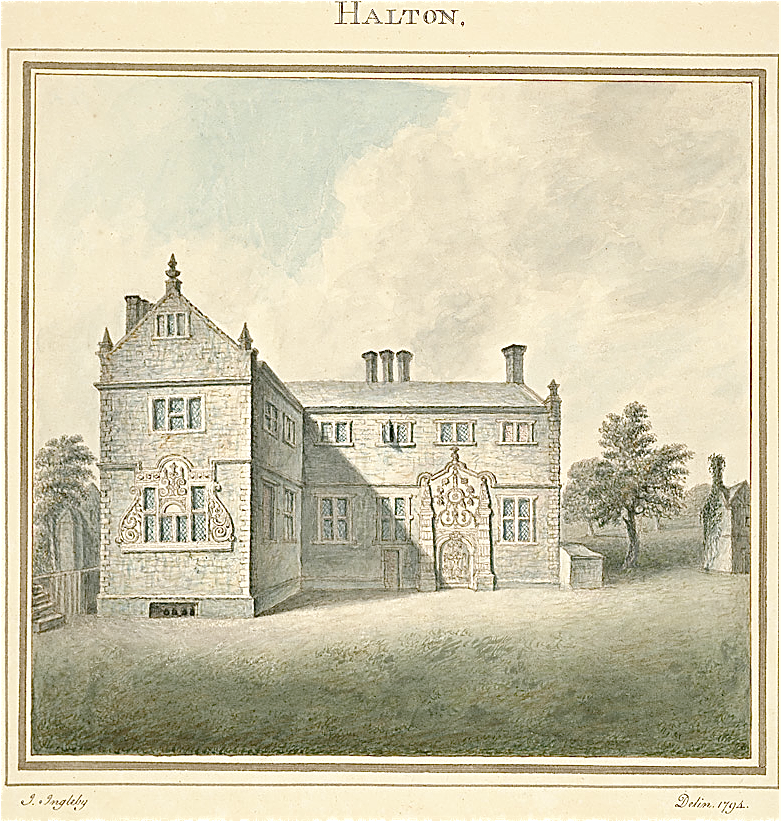
- Halghton Hall, depicted in 1794

- Location within Wrexham
- Community: Hanmer
- Principal area: Wrexham
- Preserved county: Clwyd
- Country: Wales
- Sovereign state: United Kingdom
- Post town: WHITCHURCH
- Postcode district: SY13
- Police: North Wales
- Fire: North Wales
- Ambulance: Welsh
- UK Parliament: Clwyd South
- Senedd Cymru – Welsh Parliament: Clwyd South

Halghton (Welsh: Halchdyn) is a dispersed settlement and former civil parish in the east of Wrexham County Borough, Wales. It is part of the community of Hanmer.

== History ==
Halghton is probably identifiable with the vill of "Hulhtune" noted in a 1043 charter of Leofric, Earl of Mercia, in which he bestowed a number of vills around Hanmer on his newly created monastery at Coventry.

The placename was again recorded in 1295 as "Halcton", and as "Halghton" as early as 1334. The name is of Old English origin, and means "farm (tun) in a corner of land (healh)". From medieval times up until the 19th century Halghton was a township of the old parish of Hanmer, in the area of Flintshire known as the Maelor Saesneg. The settlement never gained a church or point of focus, remaining dispersed across several kilometres. Despite this it shows a long settlement history, including four moated sites, the site of a fulling mill recorded in the 15th century, and tracts of medieval ridge and furrow. Under the 1866 Poor Law Amendment Act, the township of Halghton became a civil parish, while subsequent to an 1894 Act the civil parish became part of the Overton Rural District. When the latter along with Flintshire was abolished in 1974 Halghton became a ward of the community of Hanmer.

== Notable buildings ==
The Grade I listed Halghton Hall is a small brick-built gentry house of 1662, with evidence of an earlier medieval core.

Halghton Mill is a former corn mill, built in around 1802 and supplied with water through a leat from the Emral Brook. Nearby are an early 18th century house and a former smithy, also of historic interest.

== Notable residents ==
- John Hanmer, a patron of the poet Guto'r Glyn and one of the main Lancastrian supporters in North Wales during the Wars of the Roses: his house at Halghton was said to have been burned in 1463 by the Yorkist Duke of Norfolk and Lord Powis.
- Roger Brereton, Member of parliament for Flint Boroughs between 1604 and 1611.
- Sir Thomas Hanmer, 2nd Baronet, who lived for a time at Halghton in his mother's dower house
