= Grosvenor Bridge (Chester) =

Bridge in Chester, England

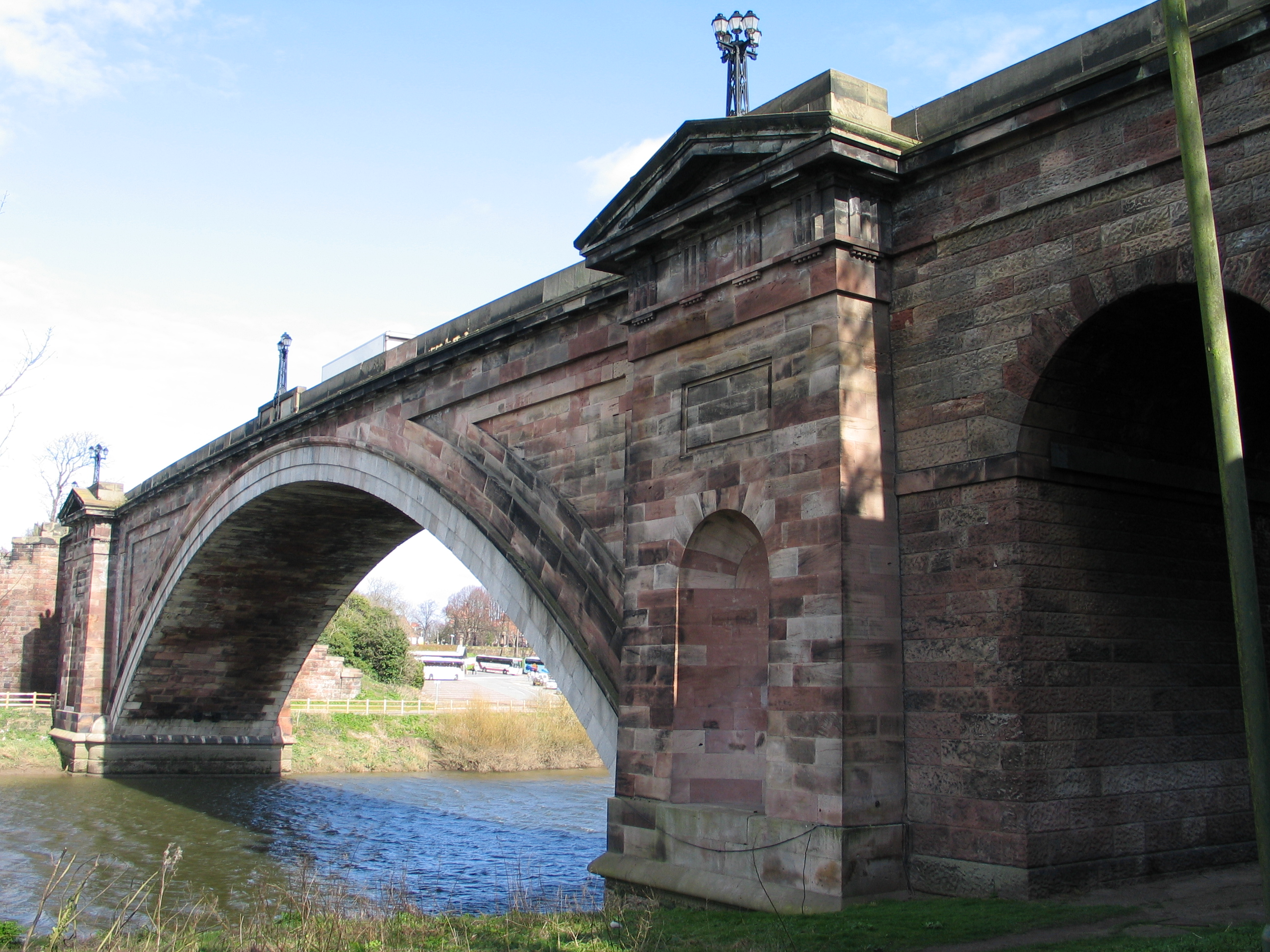
- Oblique view of the Grosvenor Bridge, taken from the South bank of the river
- Coordinates: 53°11′1″N 2°53′47″W
- Crosses: River Dee
- Locale: Chester
- Heritage status: Grade I listed

Characteristics
- Design: Arch bridge
- Height: 50 feet (15 m)
- Longest span: 200 feet (61 m)

Location
- Interactive map of Grosvenor Bridge

The Grosvenor Bridge is a single-span stone arch road bridge crossing the River Dee at Chester, England. Located on the A483 Grosvenor Road (grid reference SJ402655), it was designed by Thomas Harrison and opened by the 13-year old Princess Victoria (accompanied by her mother the Duchess of Kent) on 17 October 1832. The first traffic passed over it in November 1833.

At the time of its construction, the bridge was the longest single-span stone arch bridge in the world, a title that it retained for 30 years. It is recorded in the National Heritage List for England as a designated Grade I listed building.

Views upriver include Chester Castle and Handbridge, the impressive mansions of Curzon Park and the adjacent Roodee. Water levels of the tidal Dee vary significantly during the day.

== History ==
=== Design ===
At the beginning of the 19th century, Chester only had one river crossing, a narrow medieval bridge at Handbridge, the Old Dee Bridge. Heavily congested, it delayed movement through the town. Building a new bridge was prohibitively expensive until Thomas Telford proposed a new road between Shrewsbury and the Irish ferries at Holyhead to facilitate trade between the two islands. The route would have bypassed Chester, greatly reducing the potential income from the lucrative Irish trade routes. A committee was appointed to consider plans for a new bridge to quicken movement across the city and encourage traders to continue to stop there.

Chester was at the time a major shipbuilding city, and a very tall bridge was required to allow ships to pass underneath. A design by the architect Thomas Harrison featuring an arch 60 feet (18 m) high and 200 feet (61 m) wide was chosen. When constructed, it would be the largest arch in the world, described by chief builder James Trubshaw as "a lasting monument to the glory and superiority of Great Britain". The arch is of limestone from Anglesey, the rest the bridge gritstone. Its span remains the longest masonry arch in Britain.

=== Construction ===
The original alignment was to build the bridge between Chester Castle and the junction of what is now Old Wrexham Road. However, surveys of the river banks at this preferred location showed wetter, softer ground; Harrison was concerned it would not support the piers' weight. Eventually, Thomas Telford found a drier area of land downstream, so construction was moved to this site. As a result of the new alignment, the Chester end of Wrexham Road became a dead end (Old Wrexham Road in Overleigh) while a new highway was built to meet the bridge. The first stone of the bridge was laid by the Robert, 1st Earl Grosvenor on 1 October 1827, and construction work took six years. With the realignment of Wrexham Road, Robert Grosvenor had Chester Approach to Eaton Hall constructed as part of the major redevelopment of his estate.

In 1829, Harrison died two years into construction, so the project was completed by his pupil William Cole. On 17 October 1832, the unfinished bridge was formally opened by Princess Victoria of Saxe-Coburg-Saalfeld and her daughter, Princess Alexandrina Victoria of Kent (later Queen Victoria), who were driven through a triumphal arch staged on its roadway to a 21-gun salute. Construction was finally completed in November 1833.

A toll was imposed to pay the £50,000 (equivalent to £5,150,000 in 2025) construction costs. After more than 50 years, the toll was abolished in 1885 because it was proving harmful to trade and maintenance was transferred to Chester Corporation.

== Photographs ==
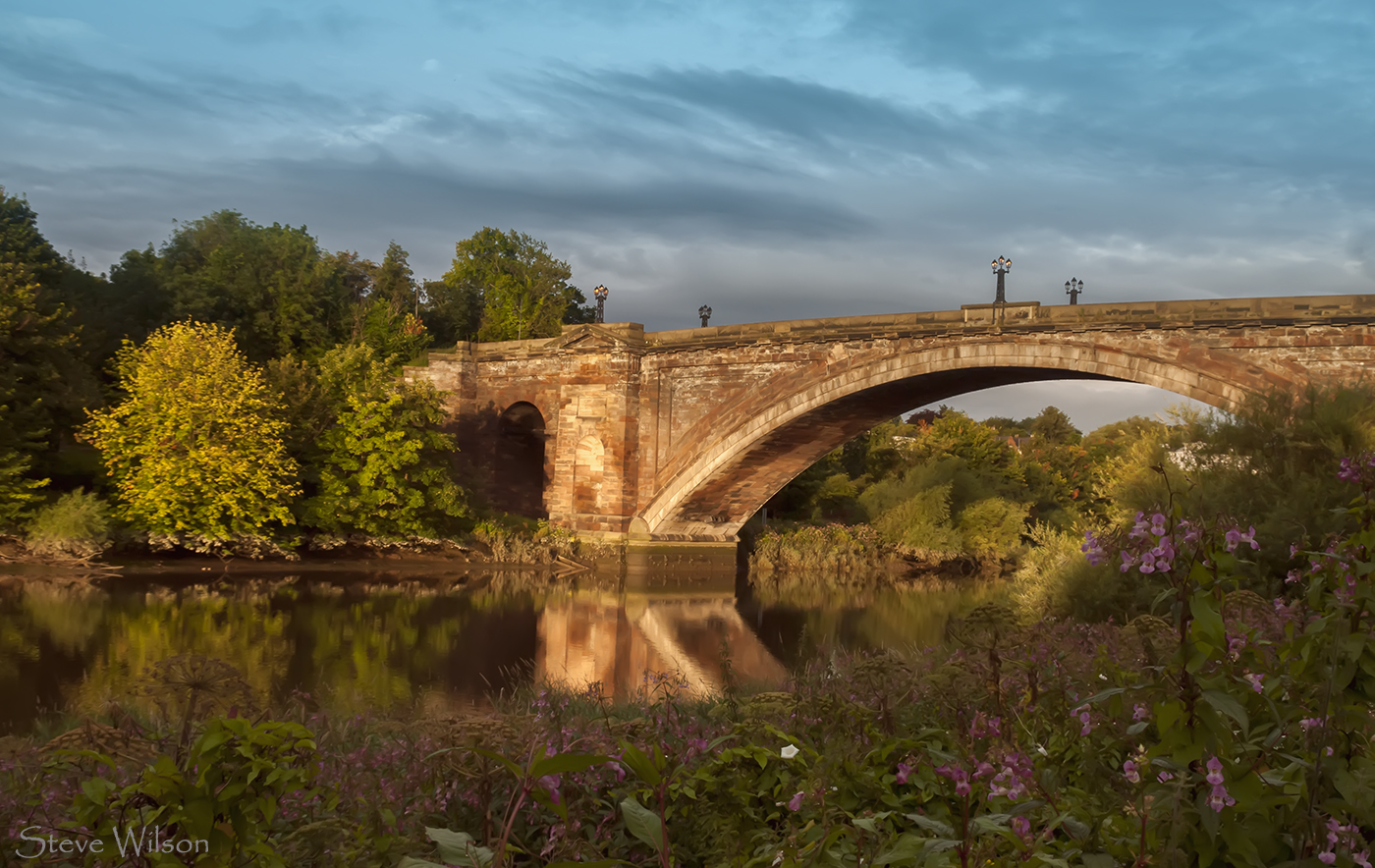
Early morning shot of the Grosvenor bridge over the River Dee

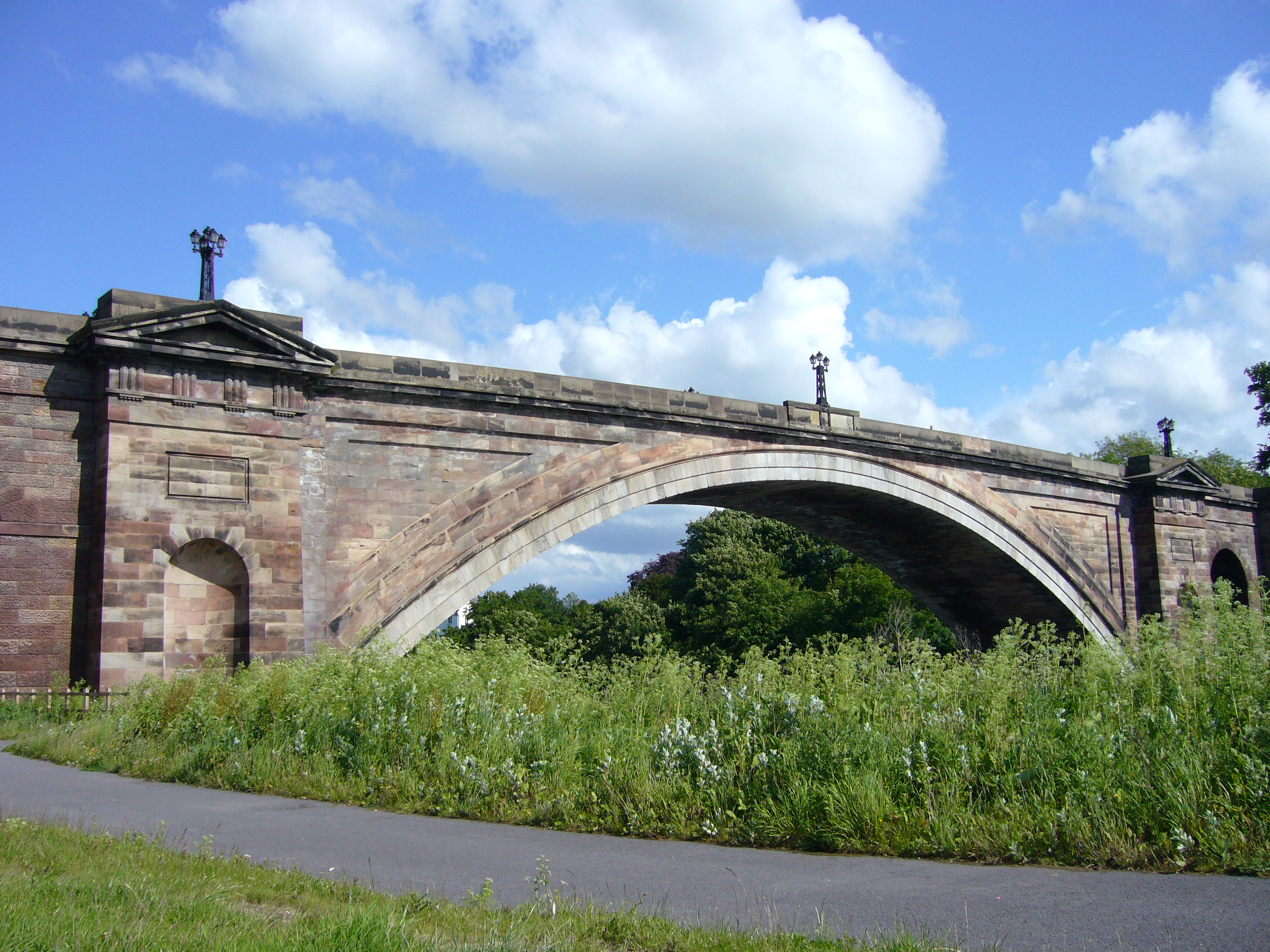
The Grosvenor Bridge, viewed from the Roodee

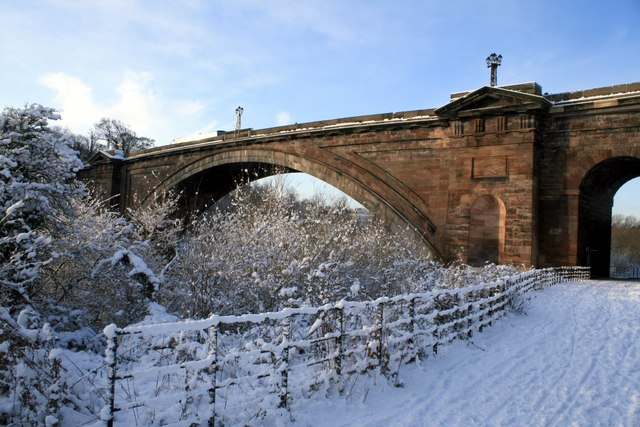
After snowfall

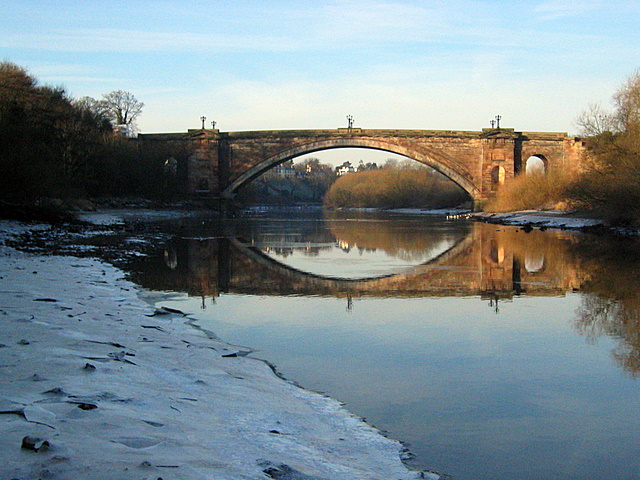
Winter view

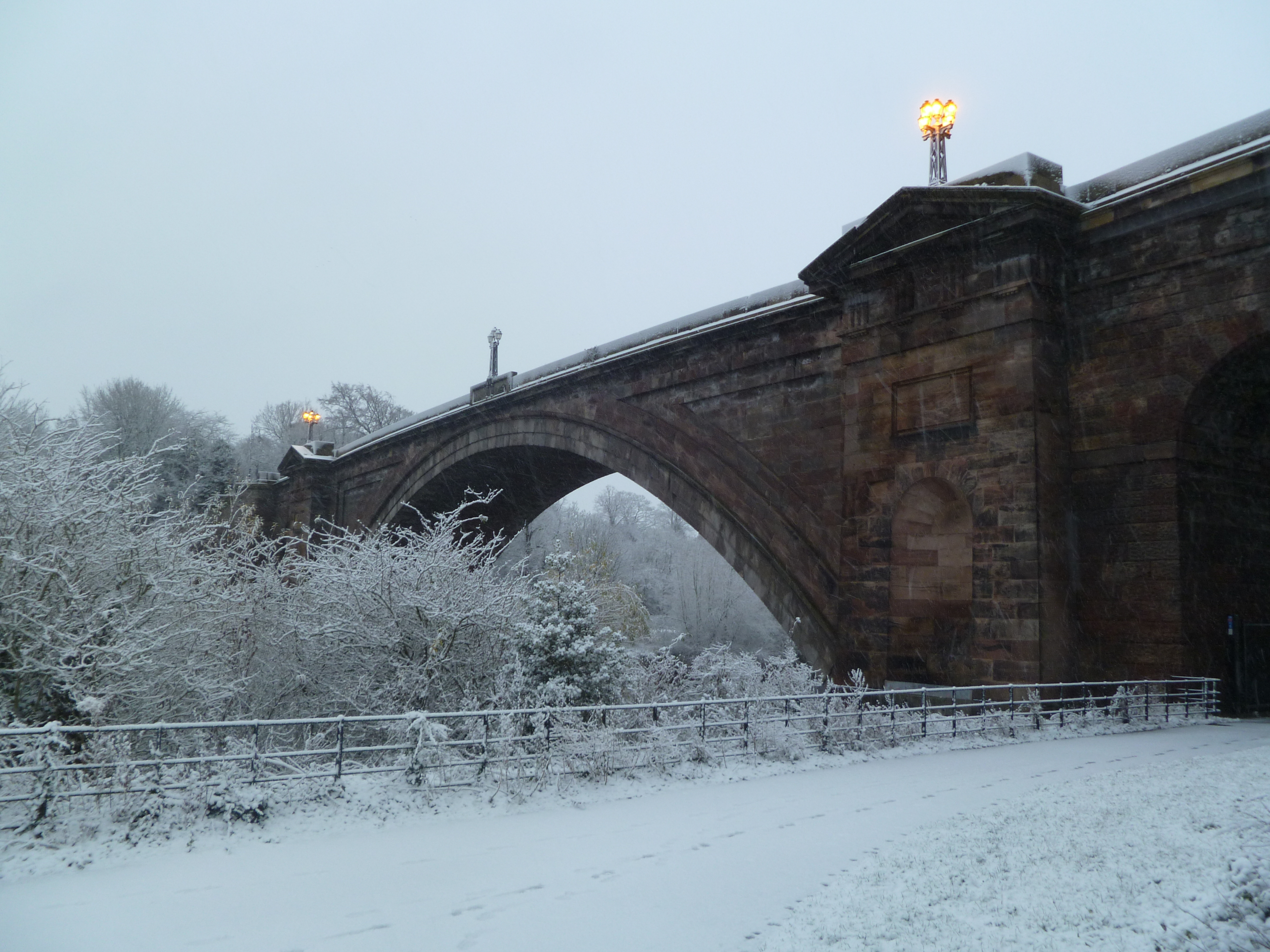
From the North bank of the River Dee in Winter

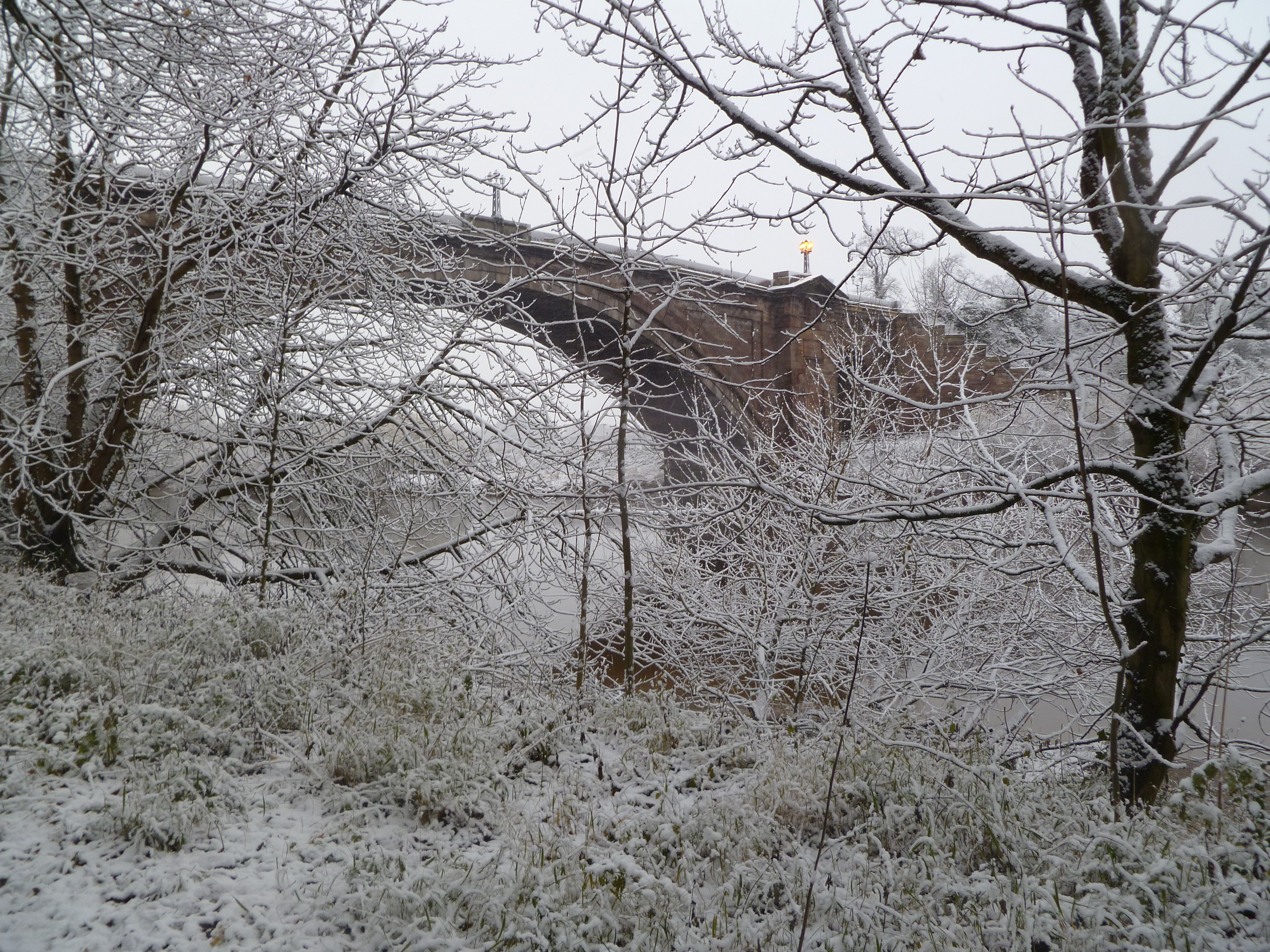
From the South bank of the River Dee in Winter

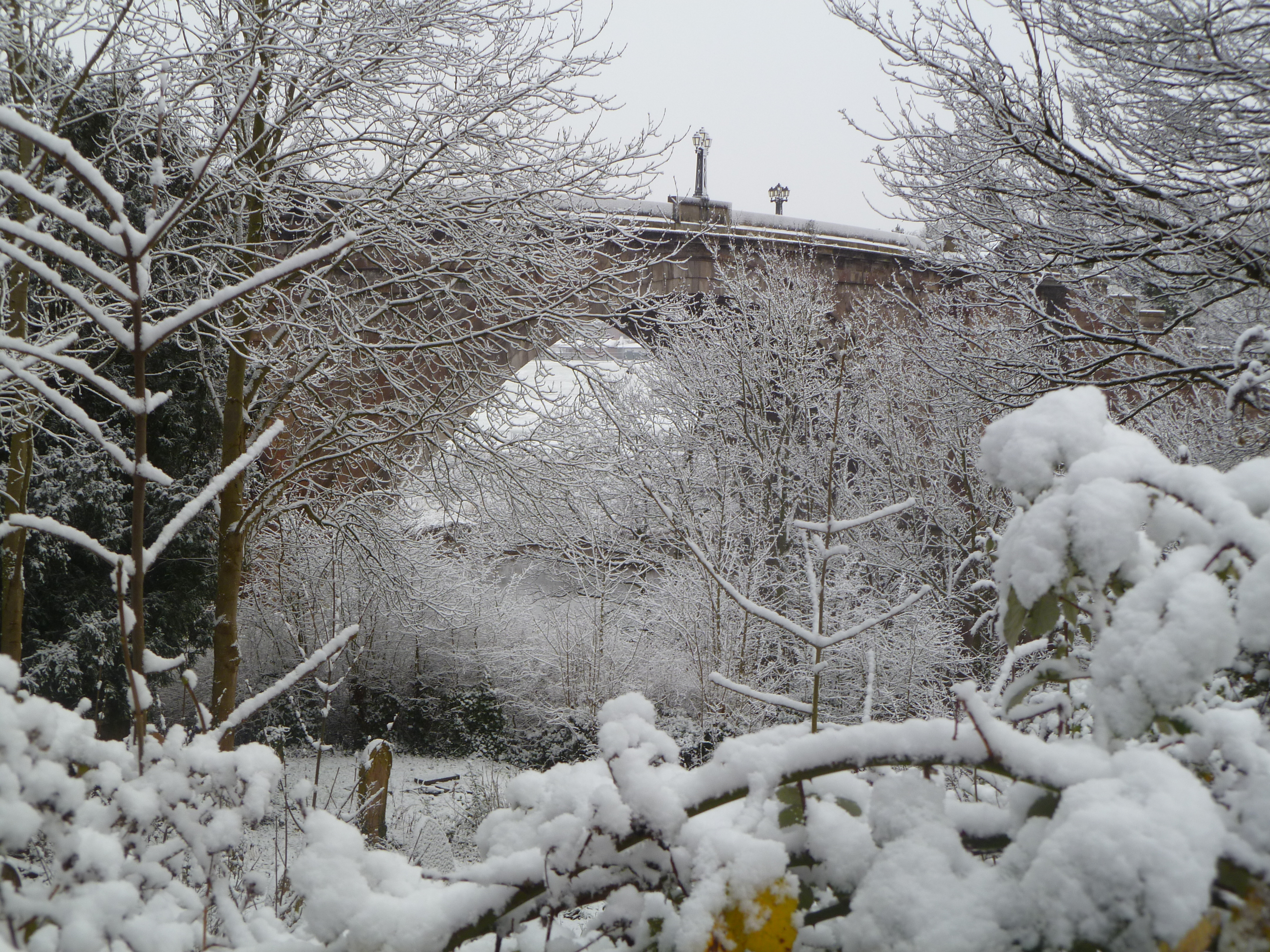
From Overleigh Cemetery in Winter

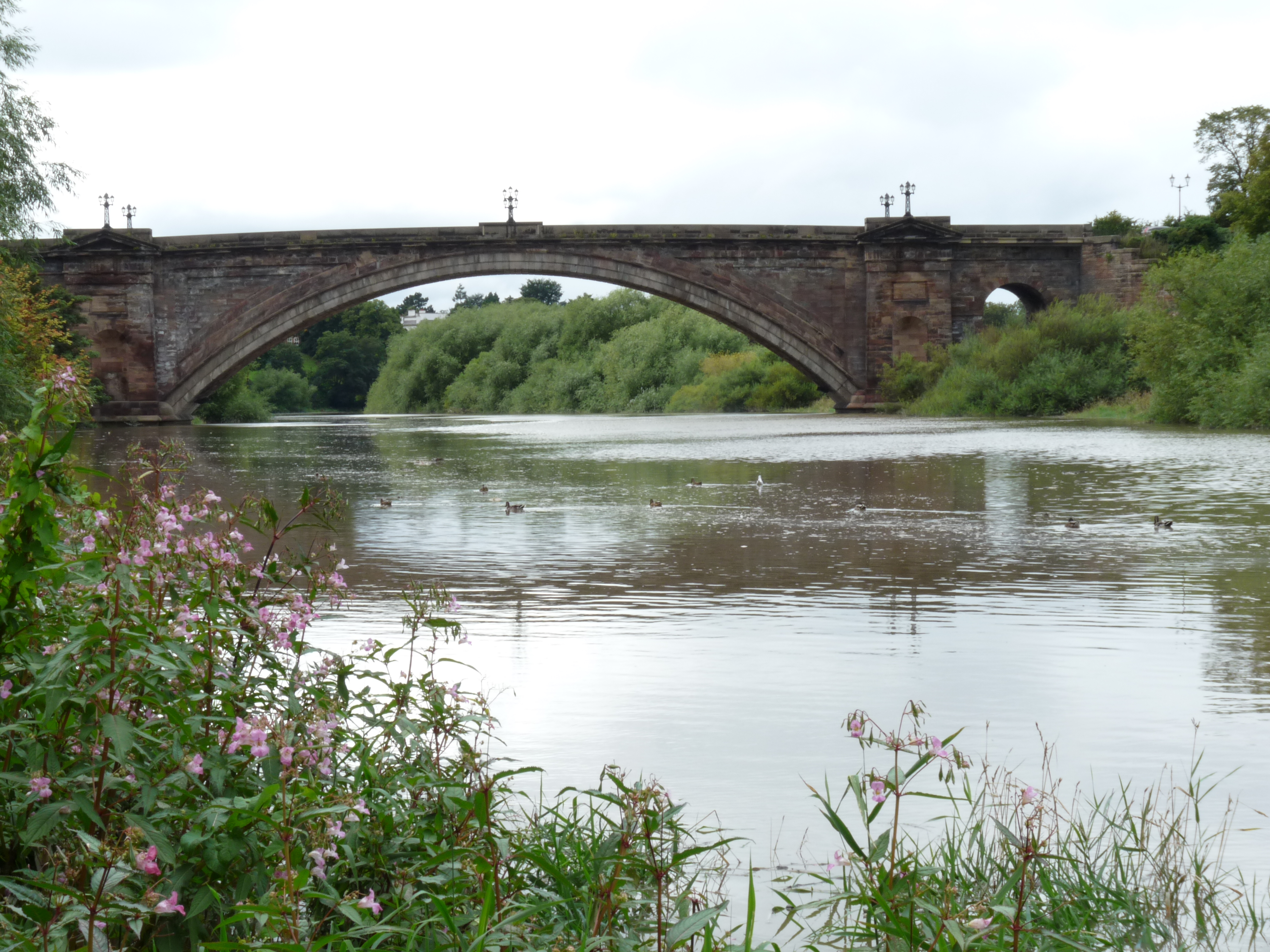
Summer view

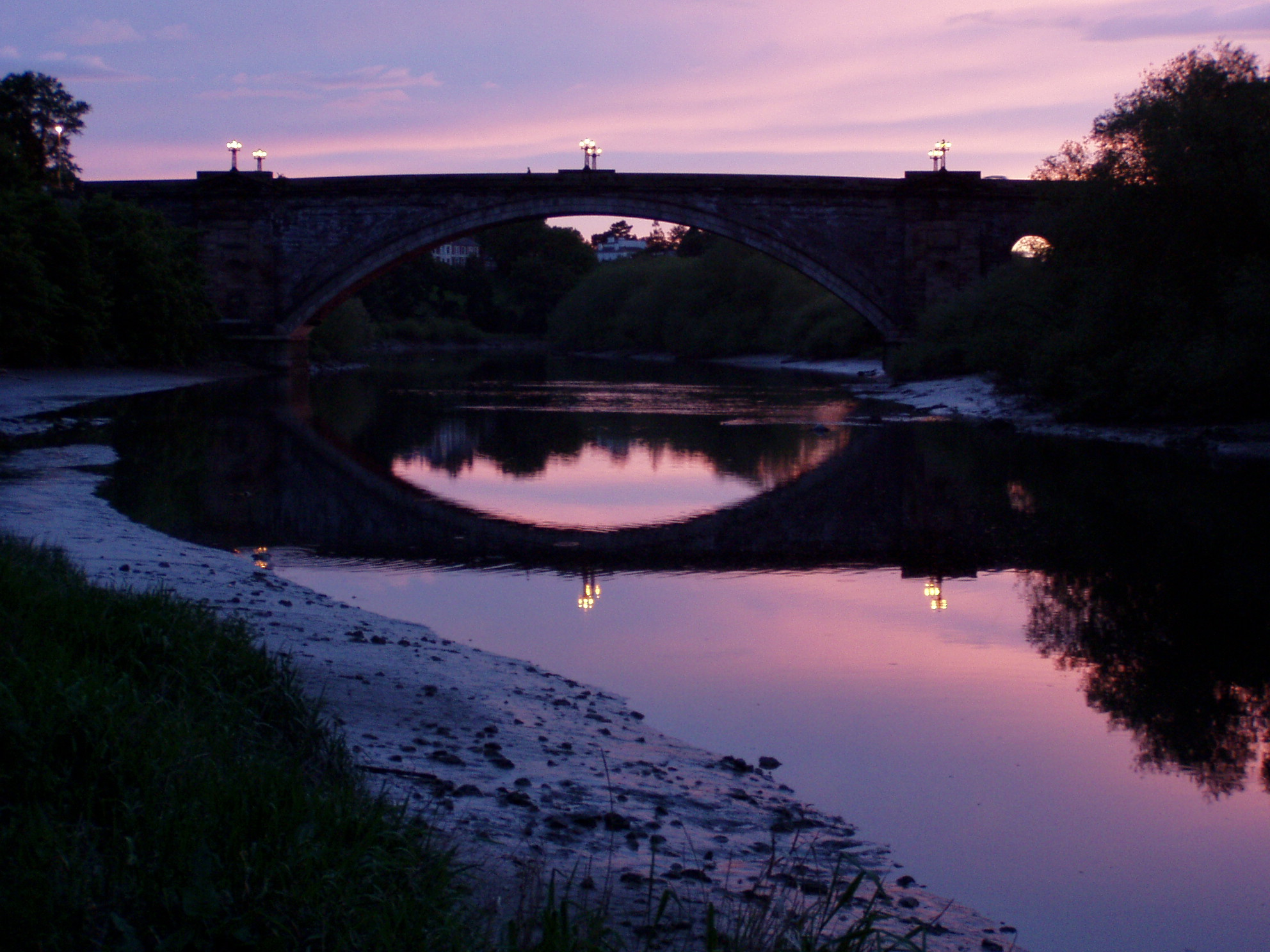
In the evening

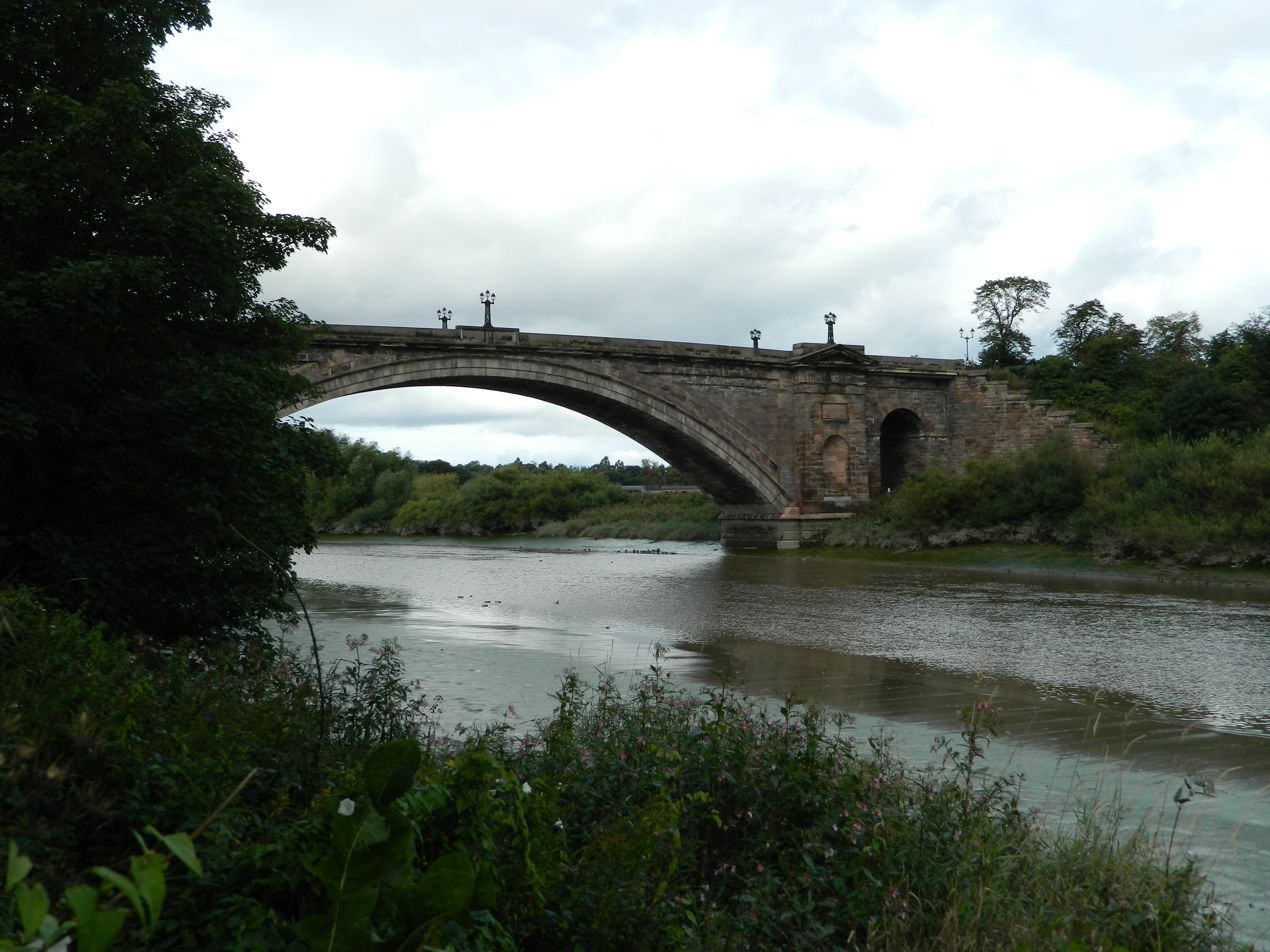
View from the south bank of the Dee, next to Overleigh cemetery

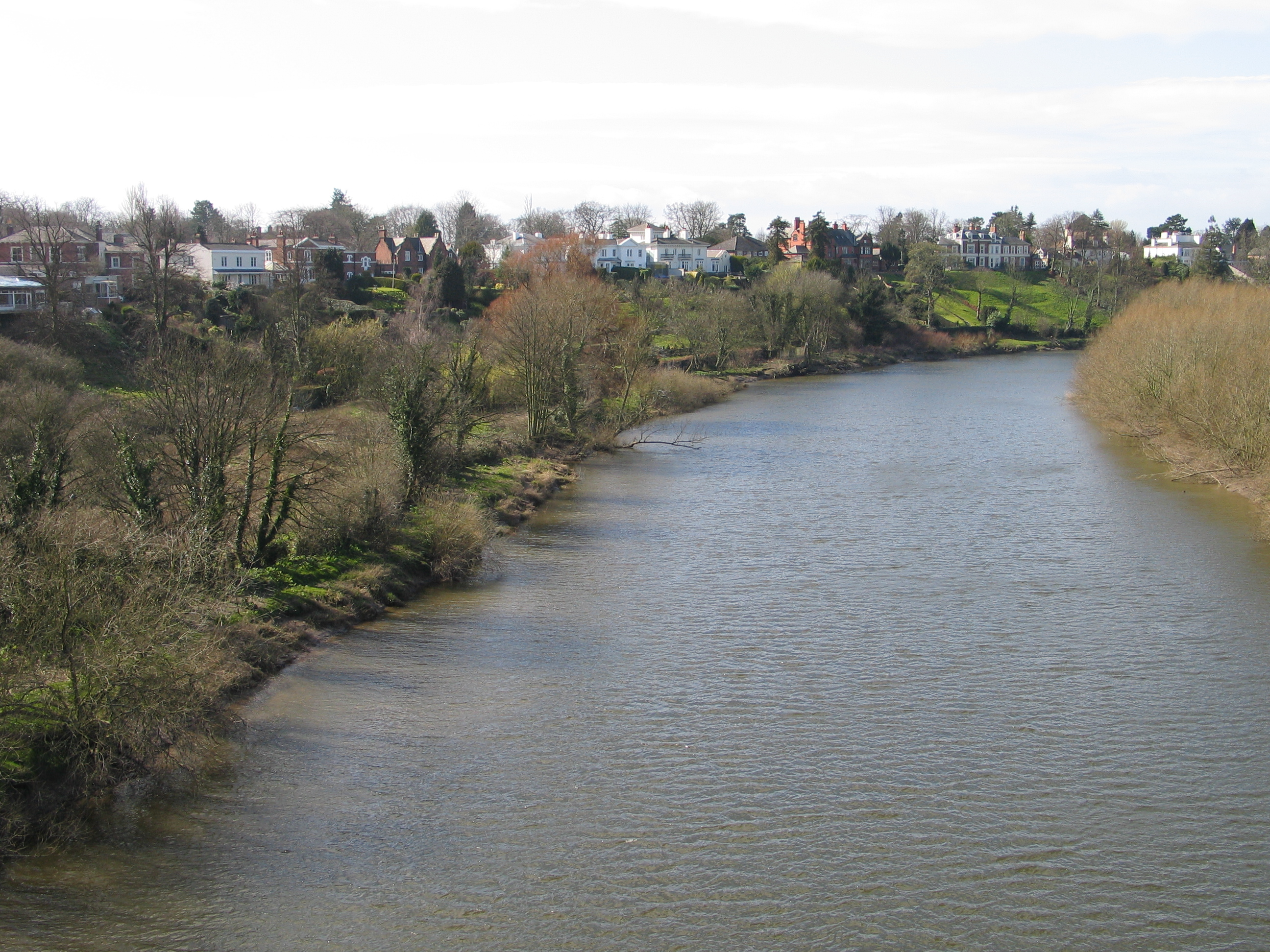
View of Curzon Park looking down-river from the bridge, showing the width of the Dee at this point. Photo taken in spring at high tide.

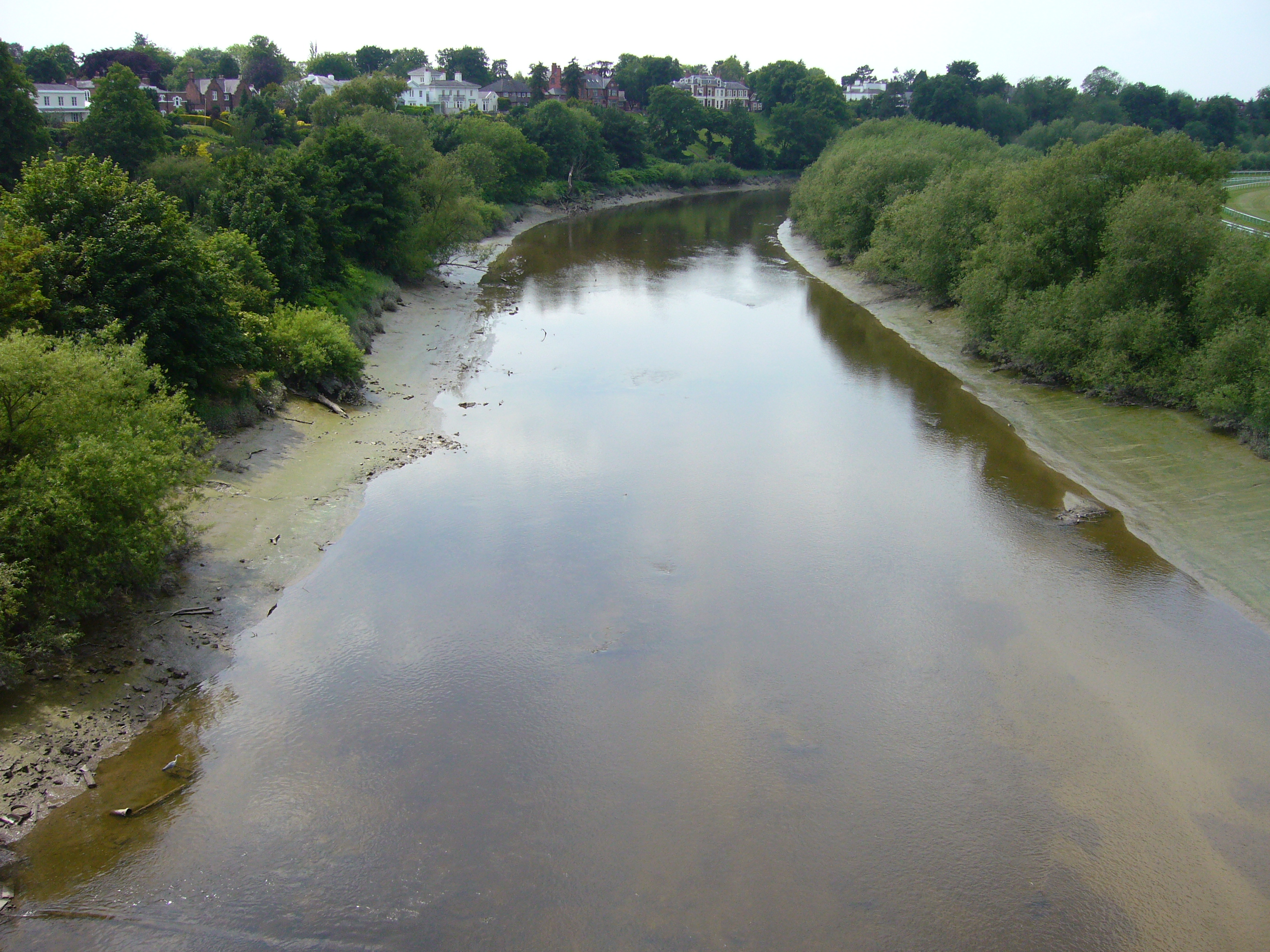
Same view in summer at low tide, looking down-river towards Curzon Park. The reduced water level is clearly visible.

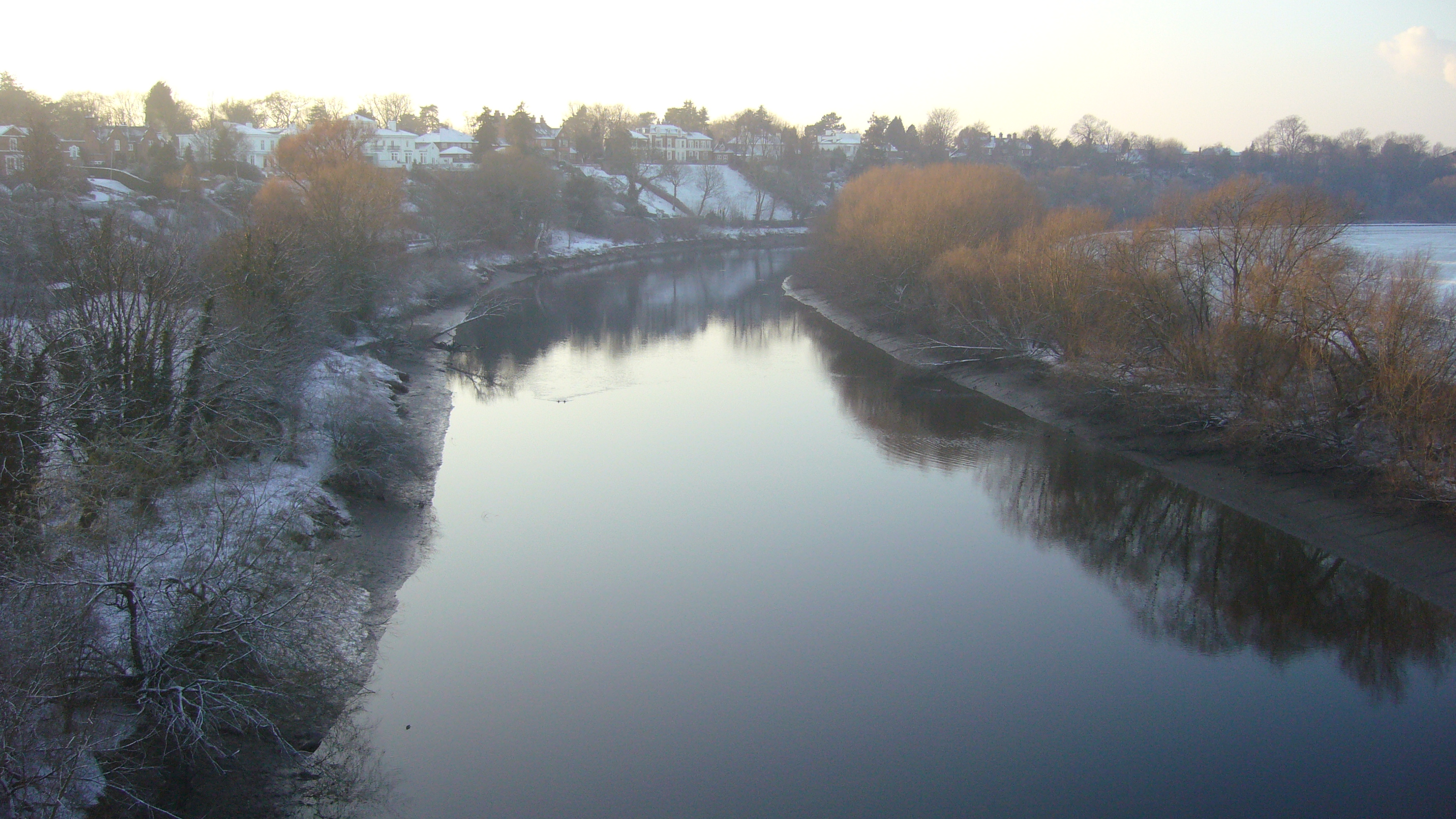
Same view in winter, after snowfall

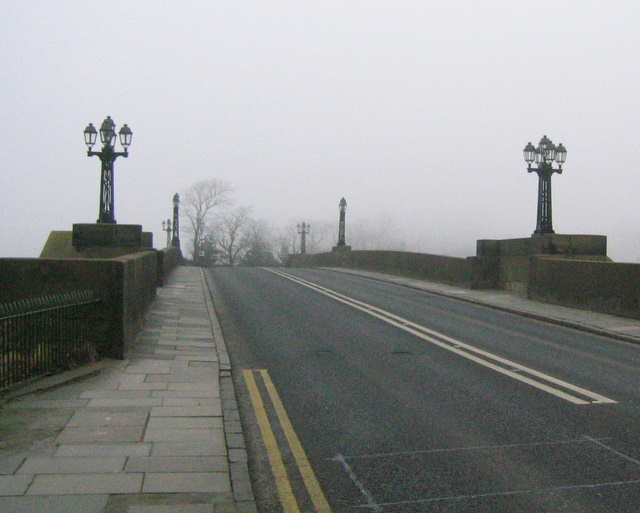
On New Year's Eve

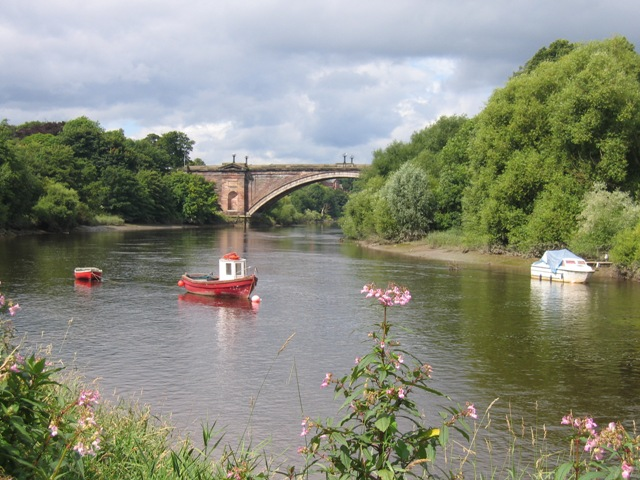
From the south bank

Copper-plate engraving of the bridge soon after completion, showing the view up-river towards Handbridge

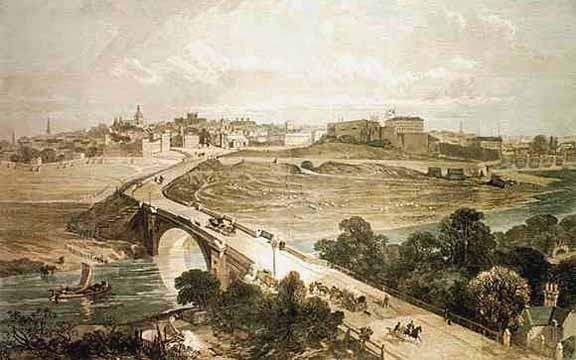
Early 19th-century print of the bridge looking Northwards into the city

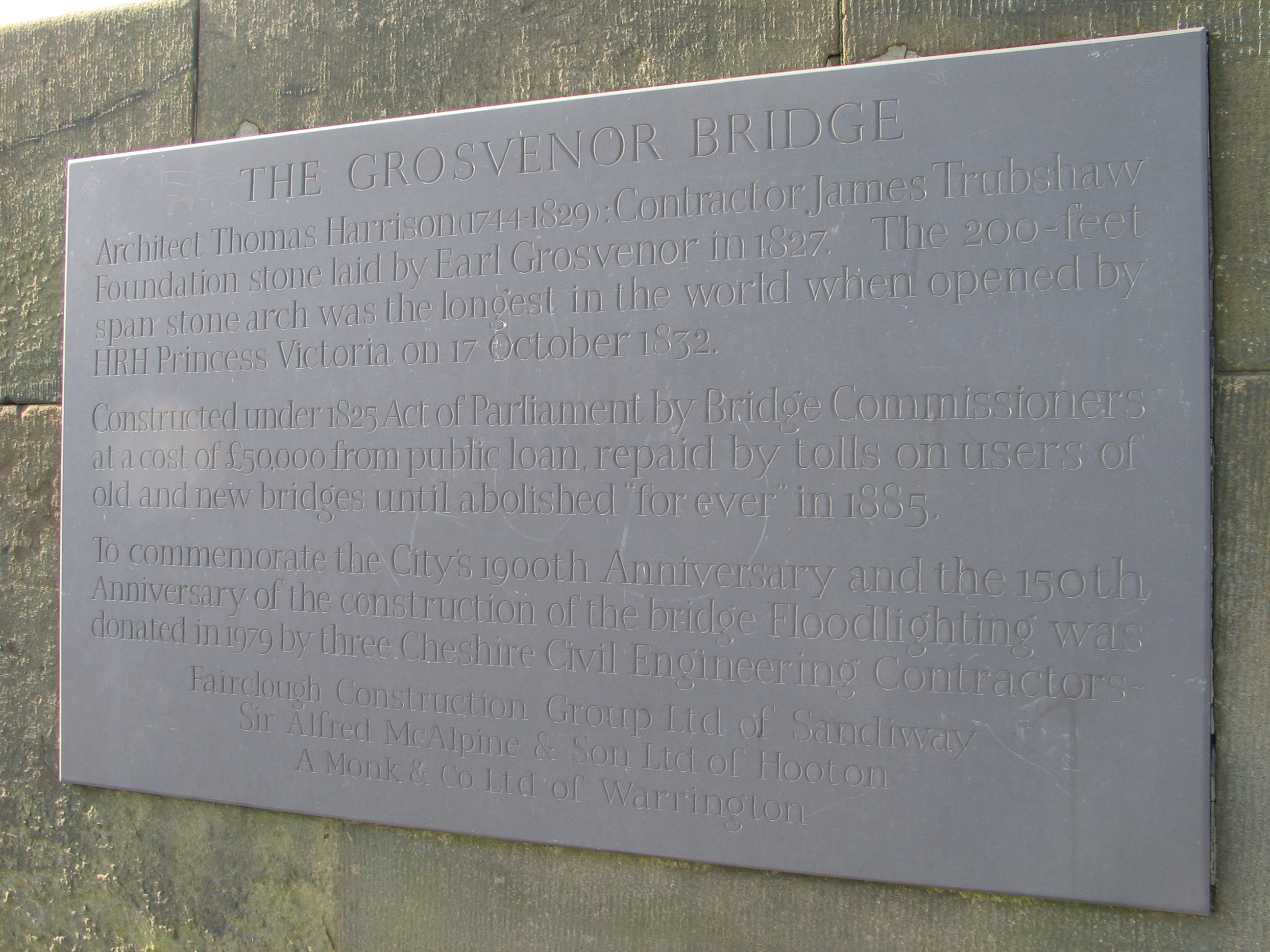
Commemorative inscription on the bridge, providing details of its construction

== See also ==
- Grade I listed buildings in Cheshire West and Chester
- List of works by Thomas Harrison
