= Dee Hills House =

- Location in Cheshire
- 53.1918°N 2.8767°W
- Location: Dee Hills Park, Chester, Cheshire, England
- OS grid reference: SJ 415 664

History
- Built: 1814

Site notes
- Architect: Thomas Harrison
- Architectural style: Neoclassical

Listed Building – Grade II
- Designated: 10 January 1972
- Reference no.: 1375763

Dee Hills House is in Dee Hills Park, Chester, Cheshire, England.

== History ==
The house was built as a country house in 1814. An extension was built in the 1930s. It was recorded in the National Heritage List for England as a designated Grade II listed building on 10 January 1972. It was designed by Thomas Harrison for Robert Baxter, and has since been altered and used as offices.

== Architecture ==
The building is made up of two storeys with a three-bay garden projection with Ionic columns facing the River Dee. The front entrance includes a Roman-styled Doric porch. The house's south front features a veranda with four Doric columns.

== See also ==
- Grade II listed buildings in Chester (east)
- List of works by Thomas Harrison
