= Hanmer Mere =

Protected lake near Wrexham, Wales

- Llyn Hanmer (Welsh)
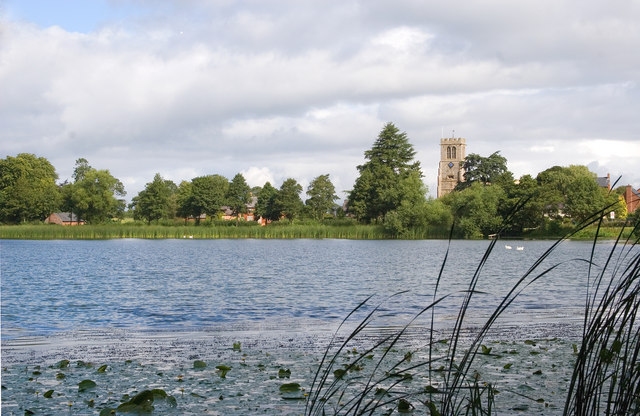
- Looking towards the Parish Church of St. Chad in the village of Hanmer

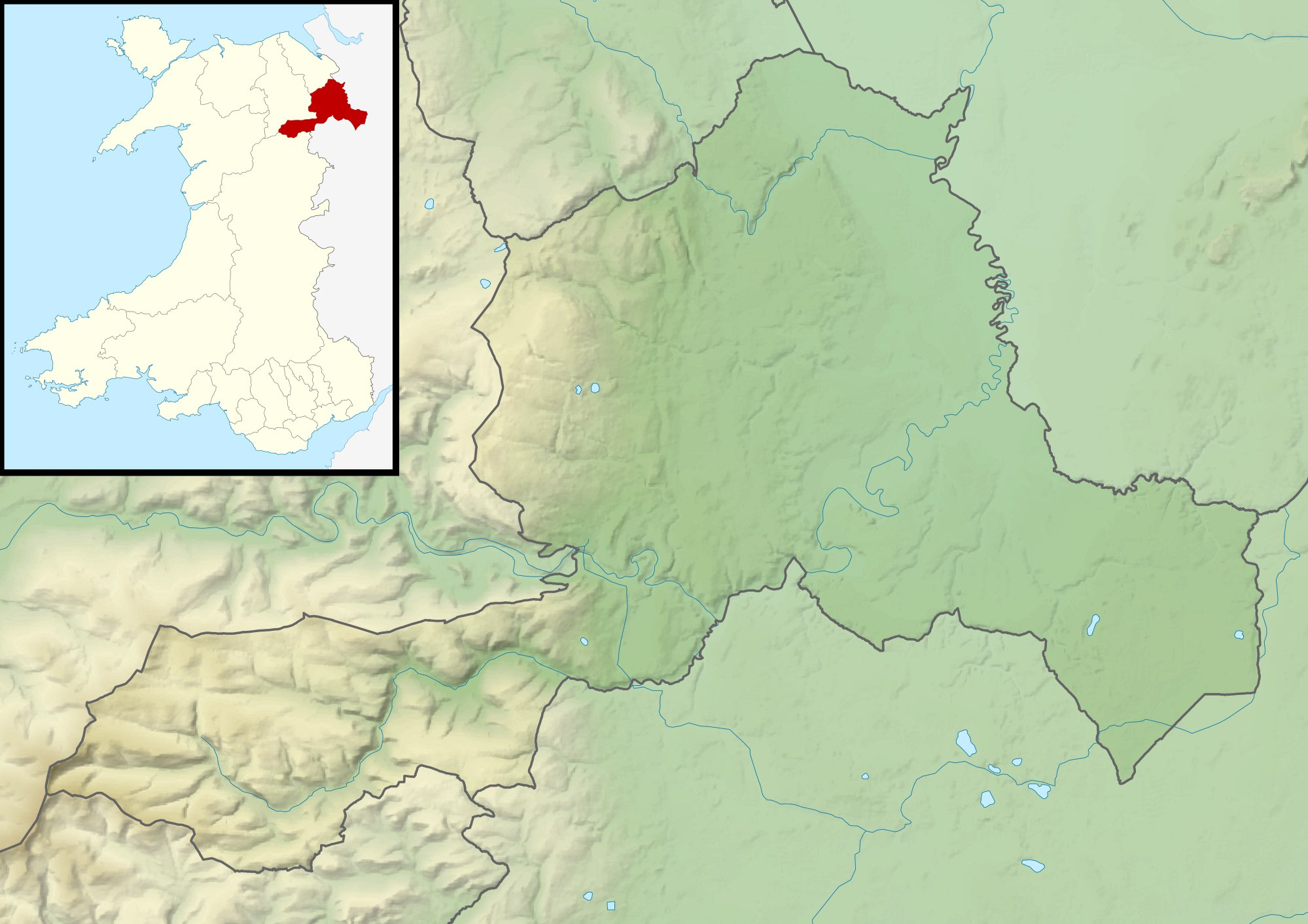
- Location within Wrexham
- Location: Wrexham County Borough, Wales
- Coordinates: 52.9476°N 2.8159°W
- Surface area: 18 hectares (44 acres)

Hanmer Mere (Welsh: Llyn Hanmer) is a natural lake and Site of Special Scientific Interest in Wrexham County Borough, Wales. The village of Hanmer is at the northern end of the lake. The lake is 18 hectares (44 acres) in extent.

== See also ==
- List of Sites of Special Scientific Interest in Clwyd
