= Chester City Club =

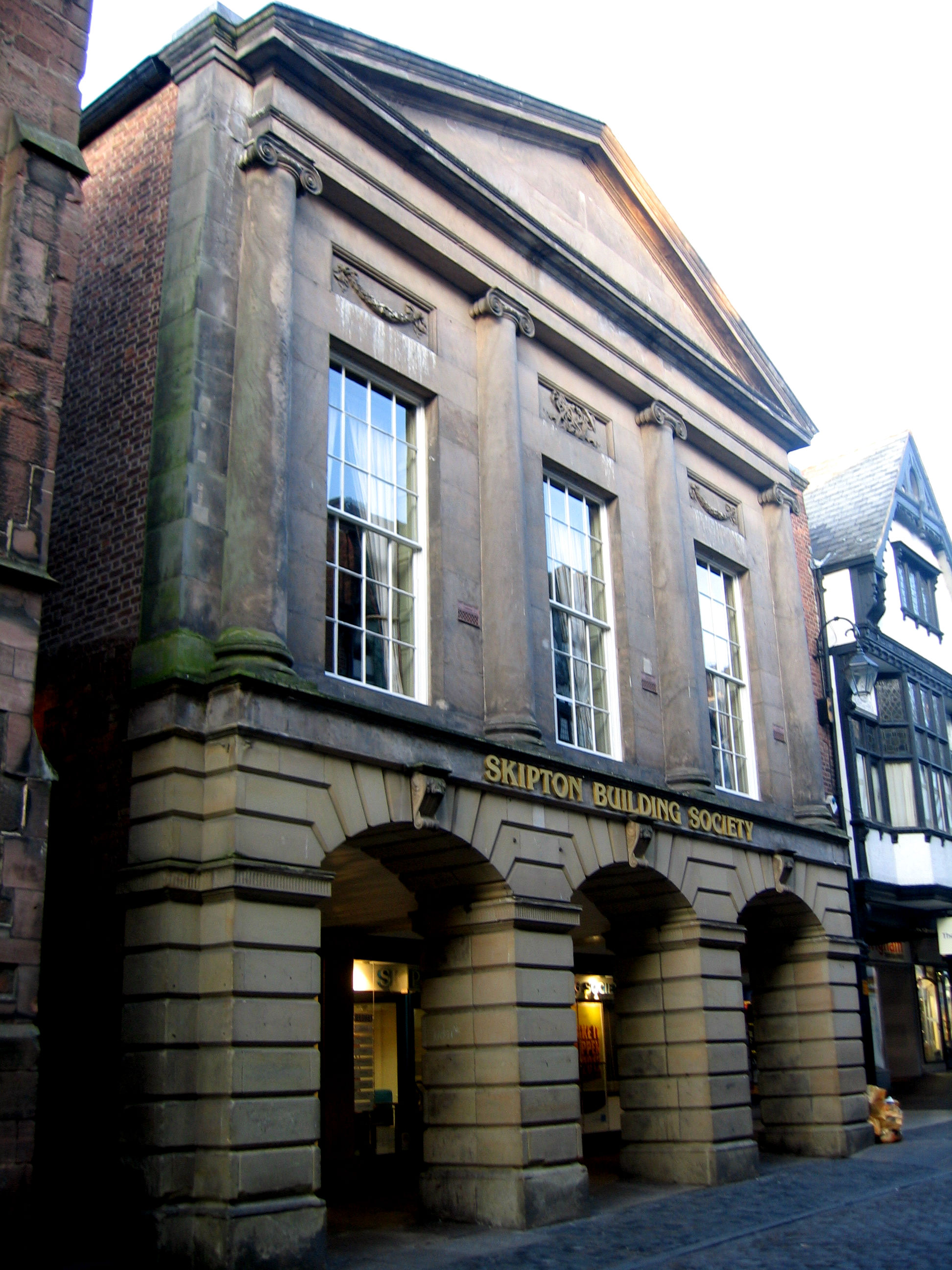
- Chester City Club

- Location in Cheshire
- 53.1906°N 2.8916°W
- Location: 1 Northgate Street, Chester, Cheshire, England
- OS grid reference: SJ 405 663

History
- Built: 1807

Site notes
- Architect: Thomas Harrison
- Architectural style: Greek Revival

Listed Building – Grade II
- Designated: 28 July 1955
- Reference no.: 1376334

Chester City Club is at 1 Northgate Street, Chester, Cheshire, England. It is recorded in the National Heritage List for England as a designated Grade II listed building.

== History ==
The newsroom was built in 1807, to a design by Thomas Harrison. It opened the following year as the Commercial Coffee Room. It was later renamed as the Commercial Newsroom. In 1815 the contents of the city library were moved into the building, but later transferred into the Mechanics' Institute, before the creation of the city's free public library in 1877. The newsroom was managed by a committee, and at the time its "automatic" members included the mayor, the local members of parliament, and leading military officers. Since the middle of the 19th century it has been known as the Chester City Club.

== Architecture ==
The building is constructed in yellow ashlar stone on the front, and brown brick on the sides and rear. Its architectural style is Greek Revival. The building is expressed as two storeys at the front, and three at the back. On the front facing Northgate Street the lower storey consists of a rusticated three-bay arcade, set behind which are modern shop fronts. In the upper storey are four Ionic pilasters dividing it into three bays, each of which contains a 24-pane sash window. At the top of the building is a pediment above an architrave and a frieze. On each side of the building, to the north and the south, are passages leading St Peter's Churchyard. The rear of the building contains the original entrance to the club.

== See also ==
- Grade II listed buildings in Chester (central)
- List of works by Thomas Harrison
