= Arowry =

Village in Wrexham County Borough, Wales

Coordinates: 52.946°N 2.809°W

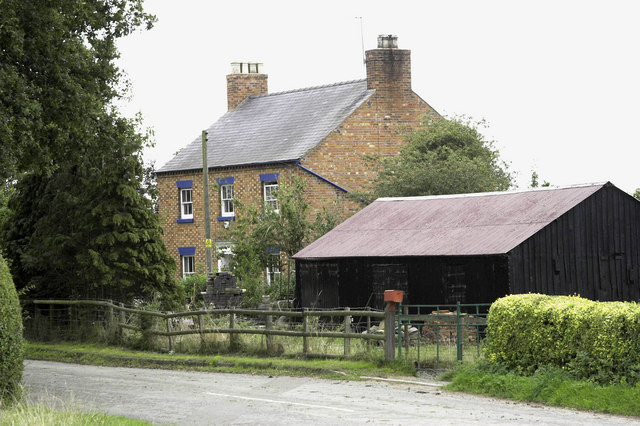
- Top House Farm, Arowry

- Location within Wrexham
- OS grid reference: SJ457390
- Community: Hanmer
- Principal area: Wrexham
- Preserved county: Clwyd
- Country: Wales
- Sovereign state: United Kingdom
- Post town: WHITCHURCH
- Postcode district: SY13
- Dialling code: 01948
- Police: North Wales
- Fire: North Wales
- Ambulance: Welsh
- UK Parliament: Clwyd South
- Senedd Cymru – Welsh Parliament: Clwyd South

Arowry (Welsh: Yr Owredd) is a village in the community of Hanmer in the rural south-east of Wrexham County Borough, Wales, near the border with England. The origin of its name, often historically used with the definite article as "the Arowry", is unclear but is thought to have a Welsh-language root. It has also been referred to as "Big Arowry", or "Great Arowry", in order to distinguish it from the hamlet of Little Arowry around a mile to the north near Horseman's Green. "Big Arowry" is the recommended name by the Welsh Language Commissioner.

Alfred Palmer, the Wrexham historian, noted that the area called Arowry, before enclosure in the late 18th century, was a "great heath" sometimes given the Welsh name "Yr Owredd", and colloquially referred to as "the Rowrey", or "the Arowry". The form "Yr Owredd" was also the name of the mansion of landowner and poet Dafydd ab Edmwnd, which once stood in the area, and was first recorded in c.1490 in the work of Tudur Aled: the English form "Rowri Heath" is first recorded c.1699 by Edward Lhuyd.

While this might imply a Welsh origin to the name, Thomas Gwynn Jones, in his discussion of Tudur Aled's work, suggested that the name Owredd was originally derived from a Welsh pronunciation of the English name "Overheath".

The commonland of the Arowry, along with several other commons in the area, was drained and enclosed following a 1774 petition by the local landowner Sir Walden Hanmer, afterwards becoming private farmland. A short distance to the east of the village is Arowry Moss, once known as Tir-y-gors, a 3 hectare lowland bog that has now become wooded over, although it remains a wildlife site of county importance.

The nineteenth-century philologist Alexander John Ellis studied the dialect of a native of Arowry, John Heatley, as part of his work, published in On Early English Pronunciation, on English dialects. The unusual dialect of the Hanmer area was later studied in the Survey of English Dialects.

The village is near the A539 road and is 10 kilometres (6 mi) west of the nearest major town, Whitchurch in Shropshire.
