= Lorna Sage =

English writer and critic (1943–2001)

- Born: Lorna Stockton; 13 January 1943; Hanmer, Flintshire, Wales
- Died: 11 January 2001 (aged 57); Norwich, England
- Education: Whitchurch High School; Durham University; University of Birmingham
- Occupations: Author literary critic academic
- Writing career
- Notable work: Bad Blood
- Notable awards: Whitbread Biography of the Year award (2001)

Lorna Sage (13 January 1943 – 11 January 2001) was an English academic, literary critic and author, remembered especially for contributing to consideration of women's writing and for a memoir of her early life, Bad Blood (2000). She taught English literature at the University of East Anglia.

== Biography ==
Sage was born in Hanmer — in Wales near the border with England — as the eldest child of Valma (née Meredith-Morris) and Eric Stockton, a haulage contractor, then serving as a second lieutenant in the Royal Welch Fusiliers. She was named after the title character of R. D. Blackmore's novel Lorna Doone. As her father was away serving in the Second World War, she was initially raised by her grandparents in Flintshire. Their marriage was deeply dysfunctional; her grandfather was an Anglican clergyman and a philandering alcoholic whose wife disliked him and lived in a separate area of their house. Sage attended a nearby Flintshire village school and then the Girls' High School in Whitchurch, Shropshire.

Lorna Stockton became pregnant by Victor Sage and they married in 1959 when she was 16. Their daughter Sharon was born in 1960, after which the couple managed to continue their education. Lorna won a scholarship to read English at Durham University, after the university's St Aidan's College changed its admission rules to admit married students. They both graduated in 1964 with first class honours, an event reported on the front page of the Daily Mail at the time. Although the couple divorced in 1974, they remained friends. Lorna later received an MA from the University of Birmingham for her thesis entitled "Poems on Poetry in the 17th Century".

Sage's childhood is recounted in her memoir Bad Blood (2000), which traces her disappointment in a family where warped behaviour passed down from generation to generation. The book won the Whitbread Biography Award on 3 January 2001.

Sage married Rupert Hodson in 1979 after meeting him in Florence on a sabbatical. The couple rented a house near Florence from Harry Brewster, where Sage wrote outside academic terms.

A week after Bad Blood was released, Sage died in London as a result of emphysema, from which she had suffered for some years. She left behind the draft of the first part of a work on Plato and Platonism in literature, which, according to Victor Sage, her former husband in 2001, she had been working on intermittently for many years. The posthumous collection Moments of Truth partly consists of reprinted introductions to classic works.

== Academic life ==
Sage spent her entire academic career at the University of East Anglia, where she became Professor of English Literature in 1994. She was twice Dean of the School of English and American Studies (in 1985–1988 and 1993–1996). She edited The Cambridge Guide to Women's Writing in English in 1999, which has become a standard work. As she wrote in the Preface: "In concentrating on women's writing... you stress the extent and pace of change, for the scale of women's access to literary life has reflected and accelerated democratic, diasporic pressures in the modern world."

Sage's book reviews appeared in the London Review of Books, The Times Literary Supplement, The New York Times Book Review and The Observer, mentioning the works of Angela Carter and covering studies of works of authors who included Christina Stead, Doris Lessing, Thomas Love Peacock, John Milton and Thomas Hardy.

== Publications ==
- Peacock: The Satirical Novels (1976)
- Doris Lessing (1983)
- Last Edwardians: An Illustrated History of Violet Trefusis & Alice Keppel (1985)
- Angela Carter (1990)
- Women in the House of Fiction (1992)
- Flesh and the Mirror; Essays on the Art of Angela Carter (1994)
- The Cambridge Guide to Women's Writing in English (1999)
- Bad Blood (2000)
- Moments of Truth: Twelve Twentieth Century Women Writers (2001): a collection of literary essays
- Good as her word: Selected Journalism (2004)
