= Hanmer, Wrexham =

Village in Wrexham County Borough, Wales

Hanmer
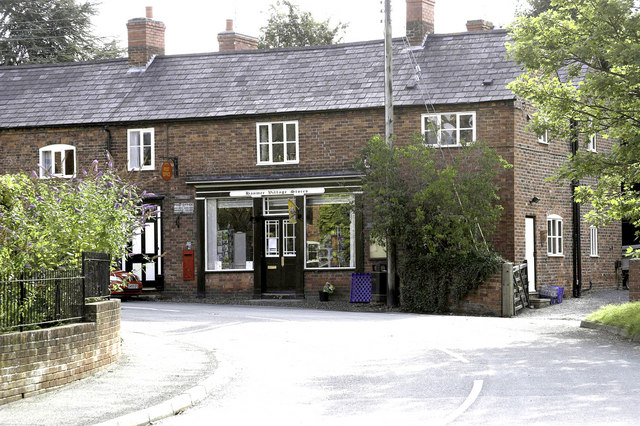
- Hanmer village shops

- Location within Wrexham
- Population: 665 (2011 Census)
- OS grid reference: SJ455396
- Community: Hanmer
- Principal area: Wrexham
- Preserved county: Clwyd
- Country: Wales
- Sovereign state: United Kingdom
- Post town: WREXHAM
- Postcode district: LL13
- Post town: WHITCHURCH
- Postcode district: SY13
- Dialling code: 01948
- Police: North Wales
- Fire: North Wales
- Ambulance: Welsh
- UK Parliament: Wrexham
- Senedd Cymru – Welsh Parliament: Clwyd South
- List of places UK Wales Wrexham 52.951°N 2.812°W Map of the community

Hanmer is a village and community in Wrexham County Borough, Wales. At the 2001 Census the population of the Hanmer community area, which includes Hanmer village itself, Horseman's Green, Halghton and Arowry along with a number of small hamlets, was recorded at 726, reducing to 665 at the 2011 Census.

== History ==
The village of Hanmer lies at the northern end of Hanmer Mere, part of the 'Shropshire lake district' of meres which was formed during the last ice-age. By the time of the Roman invasion (47 AD), the area was part of the lands occupied by the Cornovii, one of the tribes of ancient Britain who had their principal settlement at the Wrekin. It later became part of the Mercian region known as Wreocansaete. The name is thought to have either originally been "Handmere", or "Hagenamere", taking its name from a Mercian lord.

At the time of the Norman invasion the area was part of ancient Cheshire, within the Hundred of Duddeston, and it later became the estate of (and gave its name to) the prominent Hanmer family, who were descended from Sir Thomas de Macclesfield, an officer of Edward I. Sir Thomas settled in English Maelor (Welsh: Maelor Saesneg) and his family consolidated their possessions in the area through a series of marriages to heiresses of important Welsh families.

The oldest recorded reference to a church in Hanmer dates from 1110, though this building was destroyed in 1463 during the Wars of the Roses. It was rebuilt in 1490, destroyed again by fire in 1889 along with many irreplaceable architectural features, and rebuilt between 1892 and 1936, when the chancel was finally reconstructed. It is dedicated to St Chad.

Until the reorganisation of Welsh local government on 1 April 1974, Hanmer was in the detached part of the historic county of Flintshire known as English Maelor. Its local speech was recorded in depth in the Survey of English Dialects; Hanmer was the only site in North Wales to be included in the survey, and so it was grouped together with the sites in Cheshire.

== Important buildings ==
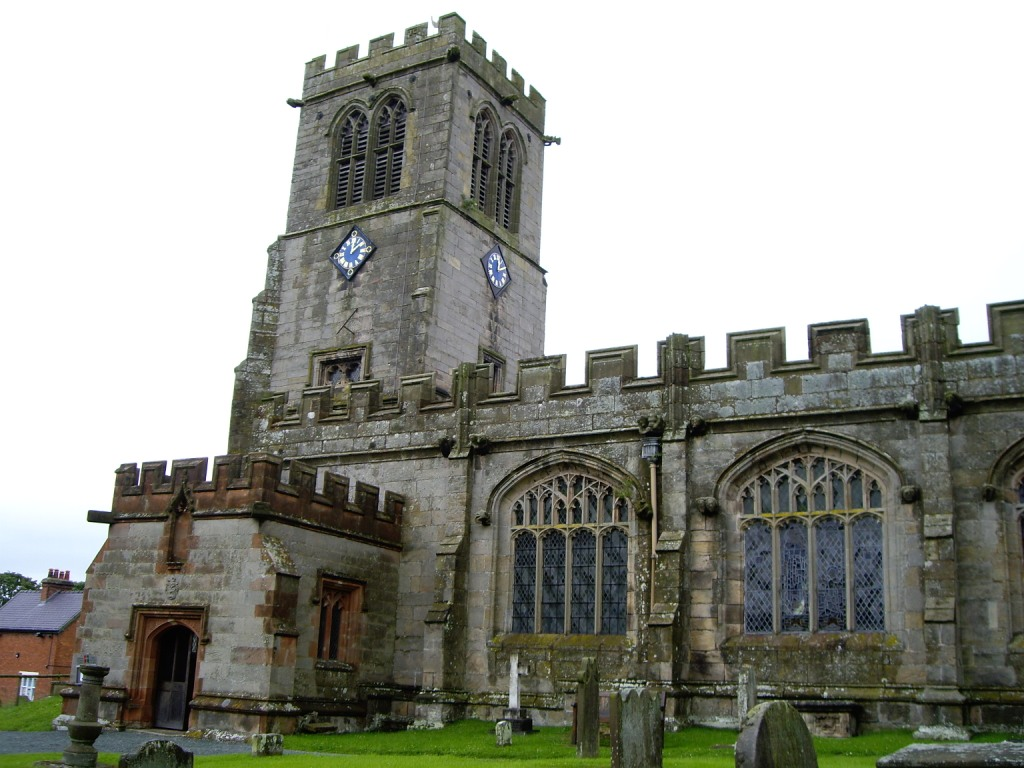
St Chad's Church

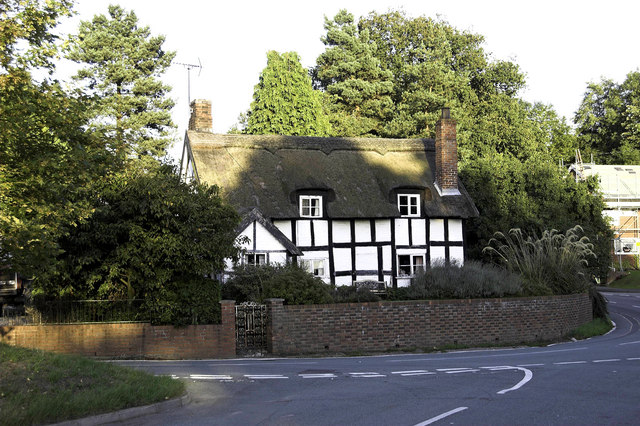
Magpie Cottage

- Halghton Hall – grade I listed house
- Saint Chad's Church – grade II* listed, as are the churchyard gates and the churchyard cross.
- Bettisfield Park – grade II* listed country house
- Hanmer War Memorial – grade II* listed
- Magpie Cottage – grade II listed

== Notable residents ==
- Dafydd ab Edmwnd (fl. c. 1450–1497), one of the prominent Welsh poets of the later Middle Ages, was born in Hanmer.
- Margaret Hanmer, daughter of Sir David Hanmer, married Owain Glyndŵr c. 1383.
- Thomas Hanmer, after whom the town of Hanmer Springs, New Zealand is named.
- Lorna Sage, author of Bad Blood, winner of the 2000 Whitbread Biography Award, grew up in Hanmer during the 1940s and 1950s. The book is about her grandfather's tenure as vicar of St Chad's parish church.
- Richard Steele (1629–1692), nonconformist theologian and rector, 1650–1666
- R. S. Thomas (1913–2000), poet, was briefly curate in Hanmer in 1940–1942.
