= Bad Blood (Sage book) =

2000 book by Lorna Sage

- First edition
- Author: Lorna Sage
- Language: English
- Genre: Memoir
- Publisher: Fourth Estate
- Publication date: 2000
- Publication place: Wales
- Media type: Print (Paperback & Hardback) & AudioBook (Cassette)
- Pages: 288 pp (first edition, paperback)
- ISBN: 1-84115-043-6 (first edition, paperback)
- OCLC: 46512313

Bad Blood is a 2000 work blending collective biography and memoir by the Anglo-Welsh literary critic and academic Lorna Sage.

Set in post-war North Wales, Bad Blood reflects on the dysfunctional generations of a family, its problems, and their effect on Sage. It won the 2001 Whitbread Book Biography of the Year seven days before Sage died of emphysema.

== Reception ==
James Fenton wrote in The New York Review of Books: "What makes the book remarkable is the individual story she has to tell, and which she delivers with such glee."

The Guardian ranked Bad Blood at number 89 in its list of 100 Best Books of the 21st Century in September 2019.

== Release details ==
- 2001, UK, Fourth Estate (ISBN 1-84115-043-6), Pub. date 10 July 2001, paperback (First edition)
