= List of electoral wards in Wrexham County Borough =

Electoral sub-division in Wrexham County Borough

The 49 electoral wards in the county borough used since 2022.

Wrexham County Borough in north-east Wales, is divided into forty-nine electoral wards for Wrexham County Borough Council elections since the 2022 election. Seven of the electoral wards have two councillors. This is the second set of electoral boundaries since the council's formation, with the first set used between 1995 and 2022.

== 2022 ward changes ==
On 23 June 2016, the Local Democracy and Boundary Commission for Wales was asked by the then Welsh Cabinet Secretary for Finance and Local Government to restart its boundary reviews of the 22 local authorities local government ward boundaries, with the review expected to be completed for the 2022 local elections.

A public consultation ahead of any draft proposals was held between 15 October 2018 and 7 January 2019.

On 6 January 2020, the commission published its draft proposals, and held another consultation for 12 weeks between 14 January 2020 to 6 April 2020. Due to the COVID-19 pandemic in Wales, the consultation was prematurely suspended on 27 March 2020, and reopened from the 1 July 2020 to 13 July 2020.

=== Draft proposals ===
Under draft proposals, the LDBCW proposed a 55-member council (increase of 3), and 48 electoral wards (increase of 1), with 7 being two-councillor wards. 22 wards would be retained.

=== Final proposals ===
Under final proposals, the LDBCW proposed a 56-member council, up 1 from the draft proposal and 4 from the existing configuration. An extra ward would be added to the proposals, to a total of 49 wards, compared to the pre-existing 47 wards. 24 wards would be retained, up from the proposed 22 in the draft proposals.

In July 2021, the Welsh Government accepted the various ward change proposals made by the Local Democracy and Boundary Commission for Wales, with only slight modification, for Wrexham County Borough. The number of electoral wards would increase from 47 to 49. The number of councillors will increase by four, from 52 to a total of 56, giving an average of 1,801 electors per councillor. These took effect from May 2021 following the election. The changes gave a better parity of representation. The Welsh Government rejected three recommendations on the names of three wards. Twenty-four wards remained unchanged. Seven wards have two councillors, up from four wards having two councillors in 2017. The changes came into force following the passing of The County Borough of Wrexham (Electoral Arrangements) Order 2021.

Of the other wards, and not mentioning minor boundary changes, the major changes are:

- New wards; Acrefair North (from Plas Madoc ward and Cefn community), Bangor Is-y-Coed and Rhos.
- Acton ward expanded to include Maesydre as Acton and Maesydre
- Bronington ward expanded to include Hanmer as Bronington and Hanmer
- Bryn Cefn expanded to include parts of Brynteg ward
- Gwenfro ward expanded to include parts of New Broughton and Brynteg wards
- Parts of Abenbury wards moved to Whitegate ward, parts of Whitegate ward (near Newton Street) moved to Smithfield ward, and parts of Smithfield ward moved to Wynnstay ward
- Split Cefn ward (a two councillor ward) into separate East and West wards (one councillor each), as Cefn East and Cefn West.
- Refer to the dually named Dyffryn Ceiriog/Ceiriog Valley ward by only its Welsh name, Dyffryn Ceiriog
- Parts of Offa ward transferred to Erddig ward
- Parts of Brynyffynnon ward transferred to Offa ward
- Split Gwersyllt East and South (a two councillor ward) into separate East and South wards (one councillor each), as Gwersyllt East and Gwersyllt South
- Abolish Johnstown ward, Plas Madoc ward, and Maesydre ward
- Overton ward expanded to include Maelor South as Overton and Maelor South
- Pant ward merged with Johnstown ward as Pant and Johnstown with two councillors.
- Various minor boundary changes
- Shrink the Ponciau ward, removing one of its two councillors.
- Wards of Acton and Maesydre (merged ward), Brymbo, Pant and Johnstown (merged ward), Rhosnesni, and Rossett, become two-councillor wards.
- Introduction of Welsh-language names used alongside English-language names for some wards.

No changes performed on the following wards:

- Borras Park
- Cartrefle
- Dyffryn Ceiriog (aside name change)
- Chirk North
- Chirk South
- Coedpoeth
- Esclusham
- Garden Village
- Gresford East and West
- Grosvenor
- Gwersyllt North
- Gwersyllt West
- Hermitage
- Little Acton
- Llangollen Rural
- Llay
- Marchwiel
- Marford and Hoseley
- Minera
- Penycae
- Penycae and Ruabon South
- Queensway
- Ruabon
- Stansty

== List of electoral wards ==
Electoral ward (2022–)	Welsh name (if applicable)	No. of councillors	Communities and community council wards (Note: All wards listed in this column are referring to the community electoral wards for their respective community councils. These wards are within the brackets following the name of the community. Many community wards share names with current and former county borough council electoral wards.)	Councillor elected in May 2022 election	Map image
Acrefair North	Gogledd Acre-fair	1	Cefn (Plas Madoc community ward and Acrefair and Penybryn community ward)	Paul Blackwell (Labour)	
Acton and Maesydre	Gwaunyterfyn a Maes-y-dre	2	Acton (Acton Central, Acton Park and Maesydre community wards)	Becca Martin (Plaid Cymru) Corin Jarvis (Labour)	
Bangor Is-y-Coed	Bangor-is-y-coed	1	Bangor Is-y-Coed Willington Worthenbury (Willington and Worthenbury wards)	Robert Ian Williams (Conservative)	
Borras Park	Parc Borras	1	Acton (Borras Park ward)	Debbie Wallice (Conservative)	
Bronington and Hanmer	Bronington a Hanmer	1	Bronington (Bronington, Iscoyd and Tybroughton community wards) Hanmer (Halghton and Hanmer community wards)	Jeremy Alexander Newton (Conservative)	
Brymbo		2	Brymbo (Brymbo ward and Vron ward)	Paul Rogers (Independent) Gary Brown (Labour)	
Bryn Cefn		1	Broughton (Bryn Cefn ward and parts of Brynteg ward)	Beverley Parry-Jones (Conservative)	
Brynyffynnon		1	Offa (Part of Brynffynon and Offa community wards)	Phill Wynn (Independent)	
Cartrefle		1	Caia Park (Cartrefle ward)	Ronnie Prince (Independent)	
Cefn East	Dwyrain Cefn	1	Cefn (Parts of Cefn community ward, and Rhosymedre and Cefn Bychan community ward)	Derek William Wright (Labour)	
Cefn West	Gorllewin Cefn	1	Cefn (Part of Acrefair and Penybryn ward, and parts of Rhosymedre and Cefn community wards)	Stella Matthews (Labour)	
Chirk North	Gogledd y Waun	1	Chirk (North ward)	Frank Hemmings (Labour)	
Chirk South	De'r Waun	1	Chirk (South ward)	Terry Evans (Independent)	
Coedpoeth	Coed-poeth	2	Coedpoeth	Krista Childs (Labour) Anthony Wedlake (Labour)	
Dyffryn Ceiriog		1	Ceiriog Ucha Glyntraian Llansantffraid (or Llansanffraid) Glyn Ceiriog	Trevor Raymond Bates (Independent)	
Erddig		1	Offa (Erddig ward and part of Offa ward)	Paul Anthony Roberts (Conservative)	
Esclusham		1	Esclusham (Bersham and Rhostyllen wards)	Mark Pritchard (Independent)	
Garden Village (Note: "Pentre Yr Ardd", with "Yr" capitalised in source, was a name suggested by Wrexham County Borough Council for the electoral ward. However, this recommendation was not applied, English name "Garden Village" is used in Welsh, following the Welsh Language Commissioner's standardisation policy, as the commissioner stated they have no evidence of a used Welsh name for the settlement.)		1	Rhosddu (Garden Village ward)	Andy Williams (Independent)	
Gresford East and West	Dwyrain a Gorllewin Gresffordd	1	Gresford (East and West wards)	Jeremy Kent (Conservative)	
Grosvenor		1	Rhosddu (Grosvenor ward)	Marc Jones (Plaid Cymru)	
Gwenfro		1	Broughton (Gwenfro ward and parts of New Broughton and Brynteg community wards)	Nigel Williams (Independent)	
Gwersyllt East	Dwyrain Gwersyllt	1	Gwersyllt (East ward and parts of South ward)	Tina Mannering (Independent)	
Gwersyllt North	Gogledd Gwersyllt	1	Gwersyllt (North ward)	Emma Holland (Plaid Cymru)	
Gwersyllt South	De Gwersyllt	1	Gwersyllt (Part of South ward)	Peter Howell (Plaid Cymru)	
Gwersyllt West	Gorllewin Gwersyllt	1	Gwersyllt (West ward)	Annette Davies (Plaid Cymru)	
Hermitage		1	Offa (Hermitage ward)	Graham Rogers (Labour)	
Holt		1	Holt (entire community) Abenbury (part) Isycoed (part)	Michael Morris (Conservative)	
Little Acton	Acton Fechan	1	Acton (Little Acton ward)	Bill Baldwin (Independent)	
Llangollen Rural	Llangollen Wledig	1	Llangollen Rural	Rondo Roberts (Independent)	
Llay	Llai	2	Llay	Rob Walsh (Independent) Bryan Apsley (Labour)	
Marchwiel (Note: The Welsh name Marchwiail was proposed by the LDBCW to be the name for the ward in both Welsh and English, but rejected by the Welsh Government in July 2021. The ward would be known as Marchwiel in both Welsh and English.)		1	Erbistock Marchwiel Sesswick	John Pritchard (Independent)	
Marford and Hoseley	Marford a Hoseley	1	Gresford (Marford and Hoseley ward)	Beryl Blackmore (Liberal Democrats)	
Minera	Mwynglawdd (Note: Initially proposed as Y Mwynglawdd by the LDBCW, rejected by the Welsh Government in July 2021 for Mwynglawdd.)	1	Minera Brymbo (Bwlchgwyn ward)	Jerry Wellens (Labour)	
New Broughton		1	Broughton (Parts of Brynteg and New Broughton community wards)	Claire Lovett (Independent)	
Offa		1	Offa (Part of Offa community ward and Brynyffynnon community ward)	Katie Wilkinson (Plaid Cymru)	
Overton and Maelor South	Owrtyn a De Maelor	1	Overton Maelor South (Penley and Bettisfield wards)	John Bernard McCusker (Independent)	
Pant and Johnstown	Pant a Johnstown	2	Rhosllanerchrugog (Johnstown community ward and Pant community ward)	Steve Joe Jones (Independent) David A Bithell (Independent)	
Penycae	Pen-y-cae	1	Penycae (Eitha ward)	John Conrad Phillips (Independent)	
Penycae and Ruabon South	Pen-y-cae a De Rhiwabon	1	Pen-y-Cae (Groes ward) Ruabon (South ward)	Alison Tynan (Independent)	
Ponciau		1	Esclusham (Pentrebychan ward) Rhosllanerchrugog (parts of Ponciau North, and Ponciau South wards)	Paul Pemberton (Independent)	
Queensway		1	Caia Park (Queensway ward)	Carrie Harper (Plaid Cymru)	
Rhos		1	Esclusham (Aberoer ward) Rhosllanerchrugog (Rhos ward; parts of Ponciau North and Ponciau South wards)	Fred Roberts (Independent)	
Rhosnesni		2	Acton (Rhosnesni community ward)	Mike Davies (Independent) Andy Gallanders (Plaid Cymru)	
Rossett	Yr Orsedd	2	Rossett (Allington and Burton wards)	Hugh Jones (Conservative) Ross Edward Shepherd (Conservative)	
Ruabon	Rhiwabon	1	Ruabon (North ward)	Dana Davies (Labour)	
Smithfield		1	Caia Park (Part of Smithfield ward and part of Whitegate ward)	Paul Williams (Plaid Cymru)	
Stansty		1	Rhosddu (Stansty ward)	David Bithell (Independent)	
Whitegate		1	Caia Park (Part of Whitegate ward and Abenbury ward)	Brian Paterson Cameron (Labour)	
Wynnstay		1	Caia Park (Wynnstay community ward and parts of Smithfield community ward)	Malcolm Christopher King (Labour)	

== Between 1995 and 2022 ==
The table following lists the electoral wards used between 1995 and 2022, with their incumbents before the May 2022 election.

The electoral wards used between 1995 and April 2022

Former Electoral ward (1995–2022)	Communities	Councillor before May 2022 election
Acton	Acton (Acton Central and Acton Park wards)	Geoff Lowe
Borras Park	Acton (Borras Park ward)	Debbie Wallice
Bronington	Bangor Is-y-Coed; Bronington; Willington Worthenbury	Rodney Skelland
Brymbo	Brymbo (Brymbo and Vron wards)	Paul Rogers
Brynyffynnon	Offa (Brynyffynnon ward)	Phil Wynn
Bryn Cefn	Broughton (Bryn Cefn ward)	Beverley Parry-Jones
Cartrefle	Caia Park (Cartrefle ward)	Ronnie Prince
Cefn	Cefn (Acrefair and Penybryn; Cefn and Rhosymedre; and Cefn Bychan wards)	Sonia Benbow-Jones Derek Wright
Chirk North	Chirk (North ward)	Frank Hemmings
Chirk South	Chirk (South ward)	Terry Evans
Coedpoeth	Coedpoeth	Krista Childs Michael Dixon
Dyffryn Ceiriog/Ceiriog Valley	Ceiriog Ucha; Glyntraian; Llansantffraid (or Llansanffraid) Glyn Ceiriog	Trevor Bates
Erddig	Offa (Erddig ward)	Paul Roberts
Esclusham	Esclusham (Bersham and Rhostyllen wards)	Mark Pritchard
Garden Village	Rhosddu (Garden Village ward)	Andy Williams
Gresford East/West	Gresford (East and West wards)	Jeremy Kent
Grosvenor	Rhosddu (Grosvenor ward)	Marc Jones
Gwenfro	Broughton (Gwenfro ward)	Nigel Williams
Gwersyllt East and South	Gwersyllt (East and South wards)	David Griffiths Tina Mannering
Gwersyllt North	Gwersyllt (North ward)	Phil Rees
Gwersyllt West	Gwersyllt (West ward)	Gwenfair Jones
Hermitage	Offa (Hermitage ward)	Graham Rogers
Holt	Abenbury; Holt; Isycoed	Michael Morris
Johnstown	Rhosllanerchrugog (Johnstown ward)	David A. Bithell
Little Acton	Acton (Little Acton ward)	William Baldwin
Llangollen Rural	Llangollen Rural	Rondo Roberts
Llay	Llay	Bryan Apsley Rob Walsh
Maesydre	Acton (Maesydre ward)	Becca Martin
Marchwiel	Erbistock; Marchwiel; Sesswick	John Pritchard
Marford and Hoseley	Gresford (Marford and Hoseley ward)	Russell Gilmartin
Minera	Minera; Brymbo (Bwlchgwyn ward)	David Kelly
New Broughton	Broughton (Brynteg and New Broughton wards)	Alan Edwards
Offa	Offa (Offa ward)	Alun Jenkins
Overton	Hanmer; Maelor South; Overton	John McCusker
Pant	Rhosllanerchrugog (Pant ward)	David Maddocks
Pen-y-cae	Penycae (Eitha ward)	John Phillips
Pen-y-cae and Ruabon South	Pen-y-Cae (Groes ward); Ruabon (South ward)	Joan Lowe
Plas Madoc	Cefn (Plas Madoc ward)	Paul Blackwell
Ponciau	Rhosllanerchrugog (Ponciau North, Ponciau South and Rhos wards); Esclusham (Aberoer and Pentrebychan wards)	Kevin Hughes Paul Pemberton
Queensway	Caia Park (Queensway ward)	Carrie Harper
Rhosnesni	Acton (Rhosnesni ward)	Mike Davies
Rossett	Rossett	Hugh Jones
Ruabon	Ruabon (North ward)	Dana Davies
Smithfield	Caia Park (Smithfield ward)	Adrienne Jeorrett
Stansty	Rhosddu* (Stansty ward)	I. David Bithell MBE
Whitegate	Caia Park* (Whitegate ward)	Brian Cameron
Wynnstay	Caia Park* (Wynnstay ward)	Malcolm King OBE

== See also ==
- Mayor of Wrexham
- List of places in Wrexham County Borough
- Community (Wales)
- List of communities in Wales § Wrexham
