= 2022 Wrexham County Borough Council election =

Election to Wrexham County Borough Council

- 5 May 2022

All 56 (▲4; previously 52) seats to Wrexham County Borough Council 29 seats needed for a majority
- Turnout: ▼36.47%

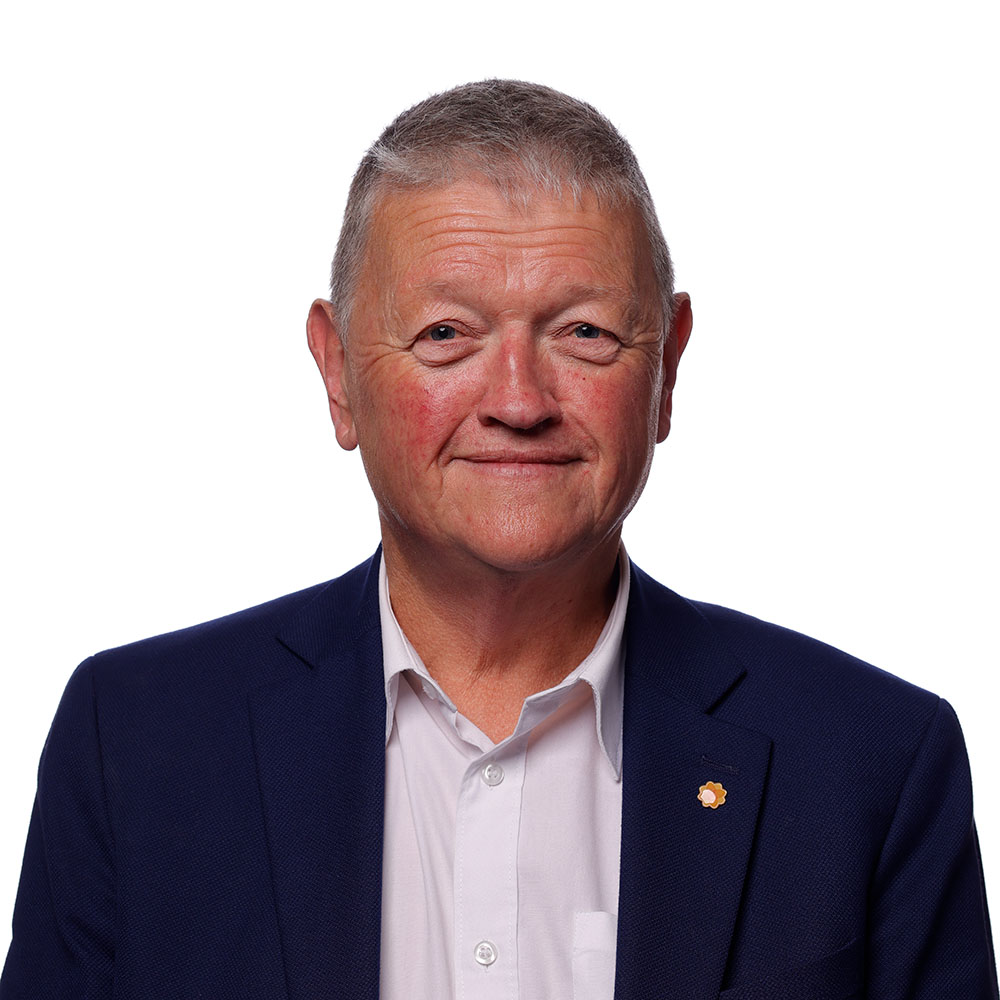
	First party	Second party	Third party
Leader	Mark Pritchard	Dana Davies	Hugh Jones
Party	Independent	Labour	Conservative
Leader's seat	Esclusham	Ruabon	Rossett
Seats before	26 (Note: This number includes those part of the "Wrexham Independents Group" which organised themselves separately in the council from the other independents before the election, as well as one "non-specified".)	12	9
Seats won	23 (Note: 6 candidates stood uncontested, 're-elected' without opposition, and the election not held in their electoral wards.)	14	9 (Note: 2 candidates stood uncontested, 're-elected' without opposition, and the election not held in their electoral wards.)
Seat change	▼3	▲2	0
	Fourth party	Fifth party
Leader	Marc Jones
Party	Plaid Cymru	Liberal Democrats
Leader's seat	Grosvenor
Seats before	3	2
Seats won	9	1
Seat change	▲6	▼1
- Map of the election results by electoral ward, coloured in party colours. Stripes indicate two councillor wards where each councillor is of a different affiliation. Inset: location of Wrexham County Borough in Wales
Council control before election
No overall control
Independent–Welsh Conservatives coalition
Council control after election
No overall control
Independent Group–Welsh Conservatives coalition

Location of Wrexham County Borough in Wales

Council composition after the 2022 election.

The 2022 Wrexham County Borough Council election took place on 5 May 2022 to elect 56 members to Wrexham County Borough Council, the principal council of Wrexham County Borough, Wales. On the same day, elections were held to the other 21 local authorities, and community councils in Wales as part of the 2022 Welsh local elections. The previous Wrexham County Borough all-council election took place in May 2017 and future elections will take place every five years, with the next scheduled for 2027.

On 5 May 2022, the election was held in forty-one of the forty-nine wards for 2022 in Wrexham County Borough. The remaining eight had no opposition nominated by 5 April 2022, and the councillors for these wards were re-elected unopposed, with their wards not holding the election. The councillors unopposed were six independents and two conservative councillors.

Independent politicians (including "non-specified" and the "Wrexham Independents") formed the largest group in the council with twenty-three councillors, down from 2017's twenty-six, and were six short of the twenty-nine needed for a majority. The second largest group were Labour with fourteen councillors elected, up from 2017's twelve councillors. The Conservatives had the same amount councillors as in 2017 with nine. Plaid Cymru increased their number of councillors to match the Conservatives also at nine, up from their three councillors in 2017. The Liberal Democrats had their share of councillors split to one councillor, down from two in 2017.

Following the results, the council was again under no overall control. Talks between independent politicians and Labour occurred over the weekend. On 10 May 2022, the two formerly separately organised groups of independents in the council, the independents and the "Wrexham Independents" group, merged into one "mega" 21-member "Independent Group". The Independent Group was initially in talks with Welsh Labour councillors but talks collapsed over mandatory councillor anti-discrimination training. On 11 May 2022, the Independent Group formed another coalition with the Welsh Conservatives for another five-year term with a total of thirty members, a two-member majority.

== Background ==
Council elections in Wales were originally scheduled for May 2021 but were delayed to avoid a conflict with the 2021 Senedd election. The frequency of the elections was also increased from four years to five years to avoid future clashes, meaning (after 2022) the next council election is expected in 2027. The number of councillors is to be increased from fifty-two to fifty-six at the 2022 election, with several ward changes to ensure better electoral parity. There would be forty-nine wards up for election, up from forty-seven in the 2017 election following a recent local boundary review.

An Independent–Welsh Conservatives coalition group was formed following the 2017 local election and were in control of the council since 2017 up to the election.

=== Local political context ===
In the 2019 United Kingdom general election, Conservative candidates won the constituencies of Wrexham and Clwyd South for the first time in their existence. The constituencies were generally considered to be Labour heartlands part of its "red wall", and were won by Labour in the June 2017 election. Sarah Atherton was elected for the Conservatives to represent the Wrexham constituency with 15,199 votes, and Simon Baynes for Clwyd South with 16,222 votes. Atherton is the first Female MP to be elected to the Wrexham seat since its creation in 1918, and the first female Conservative MP elected to Westminster representing a Welsh constituency.

On 31 January 2020, the UK left the EU, with the county borough in the 2016 referendum, voting 59% in favour of Leave.

In the 2021 Senedd election, Welsh Labour incumbents for the Senedd constituencies of Wrexham and Clwyd South covering the county borough were re-elected, despite media predictions and polling stating that one or both constituencies should follow the 2019 UK general election results and be won by Welsh Conservative candidates with a tight margin. For the 2021 Police and Crime Commissioner election, Andy Dunbobbin of the Labour and Co-operative party received the most votes (98,034) in the county borough.

Between 2017 and 2021, various community councils had by-elections, leading to three independent, four Welsh Labour, one Plaid Cymru, and five non-aligned candidates elected. An additional independent candidate was elected to Rhosllanerchrugog Community Council's Pant ward in September 2017 but was replaced by a Welsh Labour candidate in a by-election five months later. Eight elections in this period were uncontested.

On 20 September 2018, an independent candidate for community councillor for Gwersyllt North was elected with 98 votes. The councillor was later replaced in another by-election on 27 February 2020 leading to the Plaid Cymru candidate being elected with 189 votes.

On 18 March 2021, a by-election for the council's Maesydre ward occurred, leading to the Plaid Cymru candidate, Rebecca Martin, being elected with 150 votes, over the Welsh Labour (133 votes) and Welsh Conservative (123 votes) candidates.

On 28 October 2021, a by-election in the ward of Gresford East and West was held following the resignation of the incumbent Conservative candidate. The Welsh Conservatives were able to hold onto the ward, with Jeremy Kent being elected for the ward with 351 votes.

On 17 December 2021, in the neighbouring English constituency of North Shropshire, the Liberal Democrat candidate overturned a 23,000 (2019) Conservative majority following the former MP Owen Paterson's scandal.

=== Council context ===
In 2021, the council submitted bids for UK City of Culture 2025 on behalf of the county borough, and a separate bid for awarding the then town of Wrexham the status of a city for the 2022 Platinum Jubilee of Queen Elizabeth II civic honours. In October 2021, the council's bid for UK City of Culture 2025 made it onto the competition's shortlist of only 8 shortlisted places in the UK, outbidding 12 other places (20 applied in total) and being the only one of the five bids from Wales making it onto the shortlist. In March 2022, Wrexham County Borough's bid for City of Culture made onto the competition's shortlist of only four places. Wrexham's city status bid was submitted in December 2021 to local controversy. Protests against the city status bid, led by Plaid Cymru, were held outside Wrexham's Guildhall, the council's main building. A public consultation into the city status bid revealed that of those surveyed, 61% did not believe Wrexham should be awarded city status at all. Within the council, political groups threatened to walk out over the debate of city status. The council was criticised for ignoring the survey's results by submitting a bid. Wrexham's city status bid is one of 39 bids across the UK and territories, it is the only bid from Wales, following Merthyr Tydfil's withdrawal of their bid. It is hoped that being the only Welsh bid leads to increased chances of Wrexham winning city status if the Queen awards city status to at least one town in the four countries of the United Kingdom. Wrexham has applied for city status three other times, in 2000, 2002 and 2012, with the 2012 bid lost to St Asaph, Denbighshire. Following the election and unrelated to it, on 20 May 2022, it was announced that Wrexham would be awarded city status through letters patent later in 2022. However, on 31 May 2022, it had lost its bid for UK City of Culture to Bradford, but was formally awarded city status on 1 September 2022.

In January 2022, the council considered raising salaries for councillors to encourage more skilled and more diverse candidates for the 2022 election.

=== Changes since 2017 ===
Results of Maesydre by-election A total of 18 March 2021
Party	Candidate	Votes	%
Plaid Cymru	Rebecca Ann Martin	150	30.7
Welsh Labour	Thomas Stanford	133	27.2
Welsh Conservatives	Catherine Brown	123	25.2
Welsh Liberal Democrats	Peter Roger Davies	47	9.6
Independent	Clive Graham Ray	36	7.4
Total		489	

Results of Gresford East and West by-election A total of 28 October 2021
Party	Candidate	Votes	%
Welsh Conservatives	Jeremy Kent	351	43
Welsh Liberal Democrats	Beryl Blackmore	165	20
Plaid Cymru	Aimi Waters	163	20
Welsh Labour	Aled Canter	132	16
Reform UK	Charles William Henry Dodman	6	1
Green Party	Alan Butterworth	5	1
Total		822	

=== Nominations ===
The deadline for councillor nominations was 4 April 2022 at 16:00. A total of 146 candidates were nominated, a decline of 9 from 155 in 2017. These nominees included: 48 independents (down 13), 30 Welsh Labour (down 9), 28 Welsh Conservatives (up 8), 24 Plaid Cymru (up 9), 8 Welsh Liberal Democrats (down 5), 4 Wales Green Party (up 2), 3 non-aligned and 1 Reform UK candidate.

Owing to a lack of competing candidates for some electoral wards, upon the deadline for councillor nominees, eight councilors were re-elected unopposed. These uncontested seats represent 14.29% of the total seats in the election, cancelling the election for 14,583 electors. Wards with only the incumbent or one contender standing would not be holding the ward election. The number of unopposed wards (eight) represented an increase from three in the 2017 election.

The eight unopposed candidates, and their wards, were:

- Esclusham (Mark Pritchard; Independent; Council Leader)
- Garden Village (Andy Williams; Independent)
- Stansty (David Bithell; Independent)
- Borras Park (Debbie Wallice; Welsh Conservatives)
- Chirk South (Terry Evans; Independent)
- Cartrefle (Ronnie Prince; Independent; Mayor of Wrexham)
- Dyffryn Ceiriog (Trevor Bates; Independent)
- Holt (Michael Morris; Welsh Conservatives)

== Ward changes ==
Map of the wards, effective from the 2022 election

In July 2021, the Welsh Government accepted the various ward change proposals made by the Local Democracy and Boundary Commission for Wales, with only slight modification, for Wrexham County Borough. The number of councillors will increase by four, from 52 to a total of 56, giving an average of 1,801 electors per councillor. These took effect from May 2022 following the election. The changes gave a better parity of representation. The Welsh Government rejected three recommendations on the names of three wards. Twenty-four wards remained unchanged. Seven wards have two councillors, up from four wards having two councillors in 2017.

Of the other wards, and not mentioning minor boundary changes, the major changes are:

- New wards; Acrefair North (from Plas Madoc ward and Cefn community), Bangor Is-y-Coed and Rhos.
- Acton ward expanded to include Maesydre as Acton and Maesydre
- Bronington ward expanded to include Hanmer as Bronington and Hanmer
- Bryn Cefn expanded to include parts of Brynteg ward
- Gwenfro ward expanded to include parts of New Broughton and Brynteg wards
- Parts of Abenbury wards moved to Whitegate ward, parts of Whitegate ward (near Newton Street) moved to Smithfield ward, and parts of Smithfield ward moved to Wynnstay ward
- Split Cefn ward (a two councillor ward) into separate East and West wards (one councillor each), as Cefn East and Cefn West.
- Refer to the dually named Dyffryn Ceiriog/Ceiriog Valley ward by only its Welsh name, Dyffryn Ceiriog
- Parts of Offa ward transferred to Erddig ward
- Parts of Brynyffynnon ward transferred to Offa ward
- Split Gwersyllt East and South (a two councillor ward) into separate East and South wards (one councillor each), as Gwersyllt East and Gwersyllt South
- Abolish Johnstown ward, Plas Madoc ward, and Maesydre ward
- Overton ward expanded to include Maelor South as Overton and Maelor South
- Pant ward merged with Johnstown ward as Pant and Johnstown with two councillors.
- Various minor boundary changes
- Shrink the Ponciau ward, removing one of its two councillors.
- Wards of Acton and Maesydre (merged ward), Brymbo, Pant and Johnstown (merged ward), Rhosnesni, and Rossett, become two-councillor wards.
- Introduction of Welsh language names used alongside English language names for some wards.

No changes performed on the following wards:

- Borras Park
- Cartrefle
- Dyffryn Ceiriog (aside name change)
- Chirk North
- Chirk South
- Coedpoeth
- Esclusham
- Garden Village
- Gresford East and West
- Grosvenor
- Gwersyllt North
- Gwersyllt West
- Hermitage
- Little Acton
- Llangollen Rural
- Llay
- Marchwiel
- Marford and Hoseley
- Minera
- Penycae
- Penycae and Ruabon South
- Queensway
- Ruabon
- Stansty

== Overview of results ==
The election was held on 5 May 2022, no party gained a majority of seats, making the council under no overall control. Four councillors were added for the 2022 election. Below is a table comparing the seat numbers of the 2022 and 2017 election using notional election results, which uses an estimated version of 2017's results using 2022 boundaries.

=== Notional results ===
Below is an election summary table using notional election results. These are based on an estimated 2017 result using 2022's electoral boundaries, which are then compared to 2022's results. Compared to 2017, there is an increase of four councillors on the council, and various ward boundary changes. Data and calculations are provided by BBC News. Turnout was 36.47%, down from the 40% in 2017.

Wrexham County Borough Council election 2022 notional results
Party	Seats	Gains	Losses	Net gain/loss	Seats %	Votes %	Votes	+/−
Independent	23	Steady	▼5	-5	41	38.2	14,349	▼3%
Labour	14	▲3	Steady	+3	25	23.6	8,770	▼1.2%
Conservative	9	Steady	▼3	-3	16.1	15.2	5,650	▼2.1%
Plaid Cymru	9	▲6	Steady	+6	16.1	14.7	5,454	▲7.8%
Liberal Democrats	1	Steady	▼1	-1	1.8	5.1	1,881	▼3.8%
Non-aligned politician	0	Steady	Steady	Steady	0	2.6	950	
Green	0	Steady	Steady	Steady	0	0.6	236	Steady
Reform	0	Steady	Steady	Steady	0	<0.1	12	▲ <0.1%

Election statistics
	2022 Total	2017	Change from 2017
	2022 Total	or Ward	
Registered electors	87,291		
Ballots issued	31,840		
Votes cast (incl. two cllr ward ballots)	37,304		
Candidates elected	146	155	▼9
Ward with highest turnout	50%	Llangollen Rural	
Overall turnout	36.47%	40%	▼3.53%
Ward with most votes	3034	Pant and Johnstown (two cllrs)	
Ward with fewest votes	373	Queensway (one cllr)	
Ward with most spoilt ballots	25	Hermitage	
Candidate with most votes	1,168	Rob Walsh (Llay)	
Winning candidate with fewest votes	184	Paul Williams (Smithfield)	
Candidate with fewest votes	7	Stephen James Rooney (Penycae candidate)	
Winning candidates total	21,800		
Losing candidates total	15,500		

=== Summarised ward results ===
2022 election changes
Electoral ward	2017 result	Notes	2022 result	Change
Acrefair North	did not exist		Labour	new seat
Acton	Independent		abolished	
Acton and Maesydre	did not exist		Plaid Cymru	new seat
Acton and Maesydre	did not exist		Labour	new seat
Bangor Is-y-Coed	did not exist		Conservative	new seat
Borras Park	Conservative		Conservative	hold
Bronington	Conservative		abolished	
Bronington and Hanmer	did not exist		Conservative	new seat
Brymbo	Conservative	Conservative defected to Independent	Independent	hold
Brymbo	did not exist		Labour	new seat
Bryn Cefn	Conservative		Conservative	hold
Brynyffynnon	Independent		Independent	hold
Cartrefle	Independent		Independent	hold
Cefn	Independent		abolished	
Cefn	Labour		abolished	
Cefn East	did not exist		Labour	new seat
Cefn West	did not exist		Labour	new seat
Chirk North	Labour		Labour	hold
Chirk South	Independent		Independent	hold
Coedpoeth	Labour		Labour	hold
Coedpoeth	Independent		Labour	gain
Dyffryn Ceiriog (Note: Named dually with the English name "Ceiriog Valley" in 2017. Only referred to by its Welsh name "Dyffryn Ceiriog" from 2022.)	Independent		Independent	hold
Erddig	Conservative		Conservative	hold
Esclusham	Independent		Independent	hold
Garden Village	Independent		Independent	hold
Gresford East and West	Conservative	Conservative hold (28 October 2021 by-election)	Conservative	hold
Grosvenor	Plaid Cymru		Plaid Cymru	hold
Gwenfro	Independent		Independent	hold
Gwersyllt East	did not exist		Independent	new seat
Gwersyllt East and South	Independent		abolished	
Gwersyllt East and South	Independent		abolished	
Gwersyllt North	Independent		Plaid Cymru	gain
Gwersyllt South	did not exist		Plaid Cymru	new seat
Gwersyllt West	Plaid Cymru		Plaid Cymru	hold
Hermitage	Labour		Labour	hold
Holt	Conservative		Conservative	hold
Johnstown	Independent		abolished	
Little Acton	Independent		Independent	hold
Llangollen Rural	Independent		Independent	hold
Llay	Liberal Democrats	Incumbent defected from Liberal Democrats to Independents	Independent	hold
Llay	Labour		Labour	hold
Maesydre	Labour	Plaid Cymru gain from Labour (18 March 2021 by-election)	abolished	
Marchwiel	Independent		Independent	hold
Marford and Hoseley	Conservative		Liberal Democrats	gain
Minera	Independent		Labour	gain
New Broughton	Independent		Independent	hold
Offa	Liberal Democrats		Plaid Cymru	gain
Overton	Independent		abolished	
Overton and Maelor South	did not exist		Independent	new seat
Pant	Independent		abolished	
Pant and Johnstown	did not exist		Independent	new seat
Pant and Johnstown	did not exist		Independent	new seat
Penycae	Independent		Independent	hold
Penycae and Ruabon South	Independent		Independent	hold
Plas Madoc	Labour		abolished	
Ponciau	Independent		Independent	hold
Ponciau	Labour		abolished	
Queensway	Plaid Cymru		Plaid Cymru	hold
Rhos	did not exist		Independent	new seat
Rhosnesni	Independent		Independent	hold
Rhosnesni	did not exist		Plaid Cymru	new seat
Rossett	Conservative		Conservative	hold
Rossett	did not exist		Conservative	new seat
Ruabon	Labour		Labour	hold
Smithfield	Labour		Plaid Cymru	gain
Stansty	Independent		Independent	hold
Whitegate	Labour		Labour	hold
Wynnstay	Labour		Labour	hold

== Aftermath ==
Following the results, the council was under no overall control, with no single party holding a majority of councillors. Independents were initially in talks with Welsh Labour councillors over the 7–8 May weekend.

On 10 May 2022, the two formerly separately organised groups of independents in the council, the Independents, led by Mark Pritchard, and the "Wrexham Independents" group, led by David A Bithell, merged into one "mega" "the Independent Group". The group contains twenty-one of the twenty-three independent politicians elected, with Mike Davies and Ronnie Prince being the only two independents not join the group. It is led by incumbent council leader and deputy leader, Mark Pritchard and David A Bithell respectively. On the start of more talks between Labour and the Independent Group, Labour Cllr Davies, questioned whether the merger was an attempt to stay in power, and questioned the relationship between Cllr Pritchard and Cllr Bithell over a rumoured falling out prior to the election. However, Cllr Davies added if they are "able to reconcile their differences" and have a "new and ambitious agenda", then Welsh Labour would welcome the merger.

On 11 May 2022, the Independent Group formed another coalition with the Welsh Conservatives for the next five-year term following an agreement between the two. The coalition would have 30 members, a two councillor majority on the 56 seat council. Labour Cllr Davies said that the Independent–Conservatives deal was based on "pure self-interest" "to protect their own positions". Leader of Plaid Cymru in the council, Marc Jones also accused the deal to be more focused in retaining power than representation. Welsh Labour leader in the council, Dana Davies claimed talks between the two failed due to Labour's requirement that any deal involves all councillors undertaking training on addressing anti-Semitism, homophobia, racism and sexism. Cllr Davies described this deal to have been a "UK-first" and "ground-breaking" if it were to have been agreed. Cllr Davies also said that every member would have to sign up a motion condemning racism and misogyny. Talks with Plaid Cymru were ruled out from the beginning by the independents due to Plaid Cymru's disagreement with Mark Pritchard's leadership.

The Independent Group and the Welsh Conservatives following the announcement describe it to be "an exciting time for Wrexham", and Cllr Pritchard and Conservative group leader Hugh Jones said that they are "please to have reached a workable agreement [...] we will continue to build on our success".

Opposition in the council was Welsh Labour, Plaid Cymru, the two non-aligned independents, and the Liberal Democrat. The only Liberal Democrat councillor, Beryl Blackmore, subsequently joined the administration in December 2022 by moving to sit as part of the independent group (whilst remaining a Liberal Democrat).

== Full ward results ==
Incumbent councillors are marked with a *. Councillors who served for different (including abolished) wards are marked with **.

=== Acrefair North (one seat) ===
Acrefair North 2022
Party	Candidate	Votes	%	±%
Labour	Paul Blackwell**	217	54.7	
Independent	Amanda Bradley	180	45.3	
Majority		37	9.3	
Turnout			27	
Rejected ballots		4	1	
Total ballots		401		
Total valid votes		397	99	
Registered electors		1,500		
Labour win (new seat)				

=== Acton and Maesydre (two seats) ===
Acton and Maesydre 2022
Party	Candidate	Votes	%	±%
Plaid Cymru	Becca Martin**	667	48.6	
Labour	Corin Jarvis	460	33.5	
Plaid Cymru	Bobbi Cockcroft	418	30.4	
Independent	Tim Ryan	395	28.8	
Conservative	Anna Justyna Buckley	222	16.2	
Green	Peter David Sanham	59	4.3	
Majority		207		
Majority		42		
Turnout			37	
Rejected ballots		6		
Total ballots		1379		
Total valid votes		2221		
Registered electors		3,737		
Plaid Cymru win (new boundaries)				
Labour win (new seat)				

=== Bangor Is-y-Coed (one seat) ===
Bangor Is-y-Coed 2022
Party	Candidate	Votes	%	±%
Conservative	Robert Ian Williams	365	53.4	
Liberal Democrats	Tim Sly	254	37.1	
Green	Graham Bannister Kelly	65	9.5	
Majority		111	16.2	
Turnout			42	
Rejected ballots		3	0.4	
Total ballots		687		
Total valid votes		684		
Registered electors		1,624		
Conservative win (new seat)				

=== Borras Park (one seat) ===
Borras Park 2022
Party	Candidate	Votes	%	±%
Conservative	Debbie Wallice*	unopposed	n/a	n/a
Registered electors		1,964		
Conservative hold		Swing	unopposed	

=== Bronington and Hanmer (one seat) ===
Bronington and Hanmer 2022
Party	Candidate	Votes	%	±%
Conservative	Jeremy Alexander Newton	363	52.0	
Independent	Ben Martin	335	48.0	
Majority		28	4	
Turnout			47	
Rejected ballots		4	0.57	
Total ballots		702		
Total valid votes		698		
Registered electors		1,480		
Conservative hold		Swing		
Conservative win (new boundaries)				

=== Brymbo (two seats) ===
Brymbo 2022
Party	Candidate	Votes	%	±%
Independent	Paul Rogers* (Note: Stood for the Welsh Conservatives in 2017)	682	63.6	
Labour	Gary Brown	512	47.8	
Independent	Gavin Elgan Hughes	403	37.6	
Majority		170	10.6	
Majority		109	6.8	
Turnout			34	
Rejected ballots		4	0.37	
Total ballots		1076		
Total valid votes		1597		
Registered electors		3,156		
Independent hold		Swing		
Labour win (new seat)				

=== Bryn Cefn (one seat) ===
Bryn Cefn 2022
Party	Candidate	Votes	%	±%
Conservative	Beverley Parry-Jones*	373	50.8	
Labour	Jackie Owen	260	35.4	
Plaid Cymru	James Holland	101	13.8	
Majority		113	15.4	
Turnout			38	
Rejected ballots		4		
Total ballots		738		
Total valid votes		734		
Registered electors		1,943		
Conservative hold		Swing		

=== Brynyffynnon (one seat) ===
Brynyffynnon 2022
Party	Candidate	Votes	%	±%
Independent	Phil Wynn*	280	44.0	
Labour	Barbara Lloyd	214	33.6	
Plaid Cymru	Peter Derrick	143	22.4	
Majority		66	10.4	
Turnout			28	
Rejected ballots		4	0.6	
Total ballots		641		
Total valid votes		637	99.4	
Registered electors		2,265		
Independent hold		Swing		

=== Cartrefle (one seat) ===
Cartrefle 2022
Party	Candidate	Votes	%	±%
Independent	Ronnie Prince*	unopposed	n/a	
Registered electors		1,636		
Independent hold		Swing	unopposed	

=== Cefn East (one seat) ===
Cefn East 2022
Party	Candidate	Votes	%	±%
Labour	Derek William Wright**	235	51.2	
Independent	David Taylor	164	35.7	
Independent	David Metcalfe	38	8.3	
Independent	George Wood	22	4.8	
Majority		71	15.5	
Turnout			28	
Rejected ballots		5	1.1	
Total ballots		464		
Total valid votes		459	98.9	
Registered electors		1,661		
Labour win (new seat)				

=== Cefn West (one seat) ===
Cefn West 2022
Party	Candidate	Votes	%	±%
Labour	Stella Matthews	269	41.6	
Independent	Sonia Tyger Benbow-Jones**	263	40.7	
Independent	Victoria Matthews	114	17.6	
Majority		6	0.9	
Turnout			38	
Rejected ballots		2	0.3	
Total ballots		648		
Total valid votes		646	99.7	
Registered electors		1,715		
Labour win (new seat)				

=== Chirk North (one seat) ===
Chirk North 2022
Party	Candidate	Votes	%	±%
Labour	Frank Hemmings*	434	59.9	
Independent	Gareth Baines	290	40.1	
Majority		144	19.9	
Turnout			39	
Rejected ballots		5	0.7	
Total ballots		729		
Total valid votes		724	99.3	
Registered electors		1,858		
Labour hold		Swing		

=== Chirk South (one seat) ===
Chirk South 2022
Party	Candidate	Votes	%	±%
Independent	Terry Evans*	unopposed	n/a	n/a
Registered electors		1,552		
Independent hold		Swing	unopposed	

=== Coedpoeth (two seats) ===
Coedpoeth 2022
Party	Candidate	Votes	%	±%
Labour	Krista Childs*	730	61.5	
Labour	Anthony Wedlake	507	42.7	
Independent	Ben Brown	362	30.5	
Liberal Democrats	Graham Kelly	205	17.3	
Conservative	Gareth Leslie Owens	174	14.7	
Independent	Michael Dixon*	173	14.6	
Majority		223	10.4	
Majority		145	6.7	
Turnout			34	
Rejected ballots		4	0.3	
Total ballots		1191		
Total valid votes		2151		
Registered electors		3,509		
Labour hold		Swing		
Labour gain from Independent		Swing		

=== Dyffryn Ceiriog (one seat) ===
Dyffryn Ceiriog (Ceiriog Valley) 2022
Party	Candidate	Votes	%	±%
Independent	Trevor Raymond Bates*	unopposed	n/a	n/a
Registered electors		1,679		
Independent hold		Swing	unopposed	

=== Erddig (one seat) ===
Erddig 2022
Party	Candidate	Votes	%	±%
Conservative	Paul Anthony Roberts*	322	38.7	
Labour	John Ramm	174	20.9	
Independent	Alex Jones	164	19.7	
Liberal Democrats	David Richard Jones	90	10.8	
Plaid Cymru	Iolanda Banu Viegas	82	9.9	
Majority		148	17.8	
Turnout			47	
Rejected ballots		0	0	
Total ballots		832		
Total valid votes		832	100	
Registered electors		1,764		
Conservative hold		Swing		

=== Esclusham (one seat) ===
Esclusham 2022
Party	Candidate	Votes	%	±%
Independent	Mark Pritchard*	unopposed	n/a	n/a
Registered electors		2,154		
Independent hold		Swing	unopposed	

=== Garden Village (one seat) ===
Garden Village 2022
Party	Candidate	Votes	%	±%
Independent	Andy Williams*	unopposed	n/a	n/a
Registered electors		1,644		
Independent hold		Swing	unopposed	

=== Gresford East and West (one seat) ===
Gresford East and West 2022
Party	Candidate	Votes	%	±%
Conservative	Jeremy Kent* (Note: Elected in a by-election since 2017)	700	66.6	
Plaid Cymru	Aimi Waters	351	33.4	
Majority		343	32.6	
Turnout			43	
Rejected ballots		11	1	
Total ballots		1062		
Total valid votes		1051	99	
Registered electors		2,445		
Conservative hold		Swing		

=== Grosvenor (one seat) ===
Grosvenor 2022
Party	Candidate	Votes	%	±%
Plaid Cymru	Marc Jones*	382	63.3	
Labour	Ray Floyd	157	26.0	
Conservative	Patricia Sikora-Maciejewska	64	10.6	
Majority		225	37.3	
Turnout			30	
Rejected ballots		3	0.5	
Total ballots		606		
Total valid votes		603	99.5	
Registered electors		1,990		
Plaid Cymru hold		Swing		

=== Gwenfro (one seat) ===
Gwenfro 2022
Party	Candidate	Votes	%	±%
Independent	Nigel Williams*	374	76.6	
Plaid Cymru	Katie Brisco	72	14.8	
Non-aligned politician	Andrew Humphreys	42	8.6	
Majority		302	61.9	
Turnout			27	
Rejected ballots		1	0.2	
Total ballots		489		
Total valid votes		488	99.8	
Registered electors		1,809		
Independent hold		Swing		

=== Gwersyllt East (one seat) ===
Gwersyllt East 2022
Party	Candidate	Votes	%	±%
Independent	Tina Mannering**	437	52.2	
Independent	David John Griffiths**	400	47.8	
Majority		37	4.4	
Turnout			44	
Rejected ballots		11	1.3	
Total ballots		848		
Total valid votes		837	98.7	
Registered electors		1,943		
Independent win (new seat)				

David Griffiths and Tina Mannering were the two incumbent councillors for the former Gwersyllt East and South ward, and elected in 2012 for such ward.

=== Gwersyllt North (one seat) ===
Gwersyllt North 2022
Party	Candidate	Votes	%	±%
Plaid Cymru	Emma Holland	411	80.6	
Conservative	Luke Steven Howells	99	19.4	
Majority		312	61.2	
Turnout			26	
Rejected ballots		10	2	
Total ballots		520		
Total valid votes		510	98	
Registered electors		2,023		
Plaid Cymru gain from Independent		Swing		

=== Gwersyllt South (one seat) ===
Gwersyllt South 2022
Party	Candidate	Votes	%	±%
Plaid Cymru	Peter Howell	228	42.4	
Independent	Bernie Mccann	177	32.9	
Labour	Colin Powell	133	24.7	
Majority		51	9.5	
Turnout			31	
Rejected ballots		7	1.3	
Total ballots		545		
Total valid votes		538	98.7	
Registered electors		1,777		
Plaid Cymru win (new seat)				

=== Gwersyllt West (one seat) ===
Gwersyllt West 2022
Party	Candidate	Votes	%	±%
Plaid Cymru	Annette Davies	250	35.3	
Independent	Barrie Warburton**	203	28.7	
Labour	Aled Canter	189	26.7	
Conservative	Wendy O'Grady	66	9.3	
Majority		47	6.6	
Turnout			30	
Rejected ballots		3	0.4	
Total ballots		711		
Total valid votes		708	99.6	
Registered electors		2,362		
Plaid Cymru hold		Swing		

=== Hermitage (one seat) ===
Hermitage 2022
Party	Candidate	Votes	%	±%
Labour	Graham Rogers*	485	88.2	
Conservative	Lauren Louise McKenry	65	11.8	
Majority		420	76.4	
Turnout			33	
Rejected ballots		25	4.3	
Total ballots		575		
Total valid votes		550	95.7	
Registered electors		1,741		
Labour hold		Swing		

=== Holt (one seat) ===
Holt 2022
Party	Candidate	Votes	%	±%
Conservative	Michael Morris*	unopposed	n/a	n/a
Registered electors		2,219		
Conservative hold		Swing	unopposed	

=== Little Acton (one seat) ===
Little Acton 2022
Party	Candidate	Votes	%	±%
Independent	Bill Baldwin*	234	28.8	
Labour	Christina Bate	227	27.9	
Conservative	Martin Bennett	208	25.6	
Plaid Cymru	Andrew Moss	132	16.2	
Reform	Charles Dodman	12	1.5	
Majority		7	0.9	
Turnout			45	
Rejected ballots		10	1.2	
Total ballots		823		
Total valid votes		813	98.8	
Registered electors		1,829		
Independent hold		Swing		

=== Llangollen Rural (one seat) ===
Llangollen Rural 2022
Party	Candidate	Votes	%	±%
Independent	Rondo Roberts*	650	81.0	
Plaid Cymru	Rachel Allen	152	19.0	
Majority		498	62.1	
Turnout			50	
Rejected ballots		3	0.4	
Total ballots		805		
Total valid votes		802	99.6	
Registered electors		1,625		
Independent hold		Swing		

=== Llay (two seats) ===
Llay 2022
Party	Candidate	Votes	%	±%
Independent	Rob Walsh* (Note: Stood for the Liberal Democrats in 2017)	1,168	83.4	
Labour	Bryan Apsley*	775	55.4	
Conservative	Lyndon Bruce Vickery	231	16.5	
Majority		393	18	
Majority		544	25	
Turnout			37	
Rejected ballots		1		
Total ballots		1401		
Total valid votes		2174		
Registered electors		3,800		
Independent gain from Liberal Democrats		Swing		
Labour hold		Swing		

=== Marchwiel (one seat) ===
Marchwiel 2022
Party	Candidate	Votes	%	±%
Independent	John Pritchard*	390	58.0	
Plaid Cymru	Vicky Woodhouse	153	22.8	
Conservative	William Robert Martin	129	19.2	
Majority		237	35.3	
Turnout			37	
Rejected ballots		3	0.4	
Total ballots		675		
Total valid votes		672	99.6	
Registered electors		1,847		
Independent hold		Swing		

=== Marford and Hoseley (one seat) ===
Marford and Hoseley 2022
Party	Candidate	Votes	%	±%
Liberal Democrats	Beryl Blackmore	481	56.3	
Conservative	James Robert Hobbley	373	43.7	
Majority		108	12.6	
Turnout			47	
Rejected ballots		7	0.8	
Total ballots		861		
Total valid votes		854	99.2	
Registered electors		1,837		
Liberal Democrats gain from Conservative		Swing		

=== Minera (one seat) ===
Minera 2022
Party	Candidate	Votes	%	±%
Labour	Jerry Wellens	304	37.2	
Independent	Ricki McNeil	293	35.9	
Plaid Cymru	Melys Elisabeth	123	15.1	
Independent	Jeanie Barton	97	11.9	
Majority		11	1.3	
Turnout			43	
Rejected ballots		7	0.8	
Total ballots		824		
Total valid votes		817	99.2	
Registered electors		1,921		
Labour gain from Independent		Swing		

=== New Broughton (one seat) ===
New Broughton 2022
Party	Candidate	Votes	%	±%
Independent	Claire Lovett	246	39.5	
Labour	Ben Connor	140	22.5	
Plaid Cymru	Natasha Borton	115	18.5	
Independent	Gerald Davies	83	13.3	
Liberal Democrats	Luke Meyers	39	6.3	
Majority		106	17	
Turnout			32	
Rejected ballots		8	1.3	
Total ballots		631		
Total valid votes		623	98.7	
Registered electors		1,996		
Independent hold		Swing		

=== Offa (one seat) ===
Offa 2022
Party	Candidate	Votes	%	±%
Plaid Cymru	Katie Wilkinson	212	30.4	
Liberal Democrats	Alun Jenkins*	206	29.5	
Labour	Andrew Ranger	174	24.9	
Conservative	Steven Vale	80	11.5	
Green	Alan Butterworth	26	3.7	
Majority		6	0.9	
Turnout			33	
Rejected ballots		6	0.9	
Total ballots		704		
Total valid votes		698	99.1	
Registered electors		2,106		
Plaid Cymru gain from Liberal Democrats		Swing		

=== Overton and Maelor South (one seat) ===
Overton and Maelor South 2022
Party	Candidate	Votes	%	±%
Independent	John Bernard McCusker**	557	58.1	
Independent	Paul Ashton	316	33.0	
Green	Virginia Carter	86	9.0	
Majority		241	25.1	
Turnout			43	
Rejected ballots		1	0.1	
Total ballots		960		
Total valid votes		959	99.9	
Registered electors		2,236		
Independent win (new boundaries)				

=== Pant and Johnstown (two seats) ===
Pant and Johnstown 2022
Party	Candidate	Votes	%	±%
Independent	Steve Joe Jones	902	49.8	
Independent	David A Bithell**	780	43.0	
Non-aligned politician	David Maddocks**	765	42.2	
Labour	Ethan Jones	459	25.3	
Independent	Geoff Foy	128	7.1	
Majority		122	4	
Majority		15	0.5	
Turnout			44	
Rejected ballots		1		
Total ballots		1814		
Total valid votes		3034		
Registered electors		4,136		
Independent win (new seat)				
Independent win (new seat)				

=== Penycae (one seat) ===
Penycae 2022
Party	Candidate	Votes	%	±%
Independent	John Conrad Phillips*	579	92.5	
Labour	Matt Birnie	40	6.4	
Conservative	Stephen James Rooney	7	1.1	
Majority		539	86.1	
Turnout			41	
Rejected ballots		2	0.3	
Total ballots		628		
Total valid votes		626	99.7	
Registered electors		1,548		
Independent hold		Swing		

=== Penycae and Ruabon South (one seat) ===
Penycae and Ruabon South 2022
Party	Candidate	Votes	%	±%
Independent	Alison Tynan	303	37.8	
Plaid Cymru	Chris Jones	250	31.2	
Labour	Jim Roberts	248	31.0	
Majority		53	6.6	
Turnout			39	
Rejected ballots		2	0.2	
Total ballots		803		
Total valid votes		801	99.8	
Registered electors		2,063		
Independent hold		Swing		

=== Ponciau (one seat) ===
Ponciau 2022
Party	Candidate	Votes	%	±%
Independent	Paul Pemberton*	478	65.9	
Labour	Kevin Hughes*	247	34.1	
Majority		231	32	
Turnout			39	
Rejected ballots		0	0	
Total ballots		725		
Total valid votes		725	100	
Registered electors		1,878		
Independent hold		Swing		

Ponciau was reduced from a two-seat ward to a one-seat ward for the 2022 election. Both incumbents stood for re-election.

=== Queensway (one seat) ===
Queensway 2022
Party	Candidate	Votes	%	±%
Plaid Cymru	Carrie Harper*	279	74.8	
Labour	Sion Edwards	82	21.9	
Conservative	Joseph Wojcik-Jones	12	3.2	
Majority		197	53	
Turnout			26	
Rejected ballots		2	0.5	
Total ballots		375		
Total valid votes		373	99.5	
Registered electors		1,417		
Plaid Cymru hold		Swing		

=== Rhos (one seat) ===
Rhos 2022
Party	Candidate	Votes	%	±%
Independent	Fred Roberts	231	37.9	
Labour	Will Peters	189	30.9	
Independent	Paul Williams	150	24.6	
Conservative	Andrew Patrick Roberts	40	6.6	
Majority		42	6.9	
Turnout			35	
Rejected ballots		7	1.1	
Total ballots		617		
Total valid votes		610	98.9	
Registered electors		1,752		
Independent win (new seat)				

=== Rhosnesni (two seats) ===
Rhosnesni 2022
Party	Candidate	Votes	%	±%
Independent	Mike Davies*	883	79.1	
Plaid Cymru	Andy Gallanders	468	41.9	
Conservative	Catherine Brown	307	27.5	
Liberal Democrats	Roger Davies	171	15.3	
Majority		415	22.7	
Majority		161	8.8	
Turnout			38	
Rejected ballots		4	0.4	
Total ballots		1121		
Total valid votes		1829		
Registered electors		2,934		
Independent hold		Swing		
Plaid Cymru win (new seat)				

=== Rossett (two seats) ===
Rossett 2022
Party	Candidate	Votes	%	±%
Conservative	Hugh Jones*	693	63.1	
Conservative	Ross Edward Shepherd	596	54.2	
Liberal Democrats	Glenda Kelly	435	39.6	
Majority		97	5.6	
Majority		161	9.3	
Turnout			42	
Rejected ballots		11	1	
Total ballots		1110		
Total valid votes		1724		
Registered electors		2,650		
Conservative hold		Swing		
Conservative win (new seat)				

Rossett gained an additional councillor seat for 2022.

=== Ruabon (one seat) ===
Ruabon 2022
Party	Candidate	Votes	%	±%
Labour	Dana Davies*	249	32.2	
Independent	Charles Devlin	245	31.7	
Non-aligned politician	Sharon Mazzarella	143	18.5	
Plaid Cymru	Rebecca Wide	85	11.0	
Conservative	Peter James Molloy	52	6.7	
Majority		4	0.5	
Turnout			36	
Rejected ballots		2	0.3	
Total ballots		776		
Total valid votes		774	99.7	
Registered electors		2,170		
Labour hold		Swing		

=== Smithfield (one seat) ===
Smithfield 2022
Party	Candidate	Votes	%	±%
Plaid Cymru	Paul Williams	184	41.3	
Labour	Patricia Maura Williams	153	34.4	
Independent	Richard Bennett	70	15.7	
Conservative	Geoffrey Charles Sutton	38	8.5	
Majority		31	7	
Turnout			25	
Rejected ballots		7	1.5	
Total ballots		452		
Total valid votes		445	98.5	
Registered electors		1,820		
Plaid Cymru gain from Labour		Swing		

=== Stansty (one seat) ===
Stansty 2022
Party	Candidate	Votes	%	±%
Independent	David Bithell*	unopposed	n/a	n/a
Registered electors		1,735		
Independent hold		Swing	unopposed	

=== Whitegate (one seat) ===
Whitegate 2022
Party	Candidate	Votes	%	±%
Labour	Brian Paterson Cameron*	312	61.2	
Plaid Cymru	Kath Grives	144	28.2	
Conservative	Brian Wright	54	10.6	
Majority		168	32.9	
Turnout			28	
Rejected ballots		5	1	
Total ballots		515		
Total valid votes		510	99	
Registered electors		1,848		
Labour hold		Swing		

=== Wynnstay (one seat) ===
Wynnstay 2022
Party	Candidate	Votes	%	±%
Labour	Malcolm Christopher King*	195	51.9	
Independent	Colin Ridgway	110	29.3	
Plaid Cymru	Cameron Hughes	56	14.9	
Conservative	Merril Anna Maria Wolfson	15	4.0	
Majority		85	22.6	
Turnout			24	
Rejected ballots		0	0	
Total ballots		376		
Total valid votes		376	100	
Registered electors		1,576		
Labour hold		Swing		

== Changes 2022–2027 ==
=== Changes of allegiance ===
- Kate Wilkinson and Emma Holland, both elected for Plaid Cymru, left the party eight days apart in July 2024. Both subsequently joined Labour later that month.
- Anthony Wedlake, elected for Labour, left the party in March 2025 and joined the Trade Unionist and Socialist Coalition.
- Jerry Wellens, elected for Labour, left the party in April 2025 to sit as an independent.
- Robert Ian Williams, elected as a Conservative, joined Reform UK in September 2025.
- Beverley Parry-Jones, elected as a Conservative, left the party in October 2025 to sit as an independent.

== See also ==
- Wrexham County Borough Council elections
