= Wrexham County Borough Council elections =

This is a list of elections to Wrexham County Borough Council, a principal council in North Wales, established in 1996:

- 1995 Wrexham County Borough Council election
- 1999 Wrexham County Borough Council election
- 2004 Wrexham County Borough Council election
- 2008 Wrexham County Borough Council election
- 2012 Wrexham County Borough Council election
- 2017 Wrexham County Borough Council election
- 2022 Wrexham County Borough Council election
- 2027 Wrexham County Borough Council election

== See also ==
- Elections in Wales
- 2022 Welsh local elections
- Wrexham County Borough
- List of electoral wards in Wrexham County Borough
