= List of places in Wrexham County Borough =

This is a list of places in the principal area of Wrexham County Borough, Wales.

== A ==
- Aberoer
- Acrefair
- Acton
- Acton Park
- Afoneitha
- Arowry

== B ==
- Bangor-on-Dee
- Bedwell
- Bedw-lwyn
- Bersham
- Bettisfield
- Big Arowry; see Arowry
- Black Park
- Borras
- Borras Park
- Bowling Bank
- Bradley
- Broadoak
- Bronington
- Bronwylfa
- Broughton
- Brymbo
- Bryn Offa
- Bryn Pen-y-lan
- Brynhovah
- Brynteg
- Brynyreos
- Burton
- Bwlchgwyn

== C ==
- Caego
- Caia Park
- Cadney Bank
- Cefnbychan
- Cefn Mawr
- Chirk
- Cock Bank
- Coedpoeth
- Commonwood
- Crabtree Green
- Cross Lanes
- Cumber's Bank

== D ==
- Darland
- Ddôl
- Dôl-y-wern
- Drury Lane

== E ==
- Eglwys Cross, Tybroughton
- Erddig
- Erbistock
- Eyton

== F ==
- Fenns Bank
- Ffos-y-go
- Four Crosses
- Froncysyllte (Fron)
- Fron-deg
- Fron Isaf

== G ==
- Garden Village
- Garth
- Garth Trefor
- Gegin
- Glasgoed
- Glyn Ceiriog
- Glyntraean
- Golly
- Gresford
- Gwersyllt
- Gwynfryn
- Gyfelia

== H ==
- Hafod-y-bwch
- Halghton
- Halton
- Hanmer
- Hightown
- Holly Bush
- Holt
- Honkley
- Horseman's Green

== I ==
- Isycoed

== J ==
- Johnstown

== K ==
- Knolton
- Knolton Bryn

== L ==
- Lavister
- Lightwood Green
- Little Acton
- Little Arowry
- Little Green
- Little Overton
- Llanarmon Dyffryn Ceiriog
- Llansantffraid Glyn Ceiriog; see Glyn Ceiriog
- Llan-y-pwll
- Llwyneinion
- Llwynmawr
- Llwyn-onn
- Llay

== M ==
- Maes-y-dre
- Marchwiel
- Marford
- Merehead
- Minera
- Moss
- Moss Valley
- Mount Sion

== N ==
- New Brighton
- New Broughton
- Newbridge

== O ==
- Overton-on-Dee (Overton)

== P ==
- Parkey
- Pandy (Ceiriog)
- Pandy (Gwersyllt)
- Parkey
- Park Lane
- Parkside
- Pant
- Penley
- Pen-rhos
- Pentre (Chirk)
- Pentre (Ruabon)
- Pentre Broughton
- Pentre Bychan
- Pentre Maelor
- Pen-y-bryn
- Pen-y-cae
- Plas Coch
- Plas Madoc
- Ponciau
- Pontfadog
- Pont-y-blew

== Q ==
- Queen's Park, and Queensway, see Caia Park

== R ==
- Redbrook
- Ridleywood
- Rhewl
- Rhosddu
- Rhosllanerchrugog
- Rhosnesni
- Rhosrobin
- Rhostyllen
- Rhosymadoc
- Rhosymedre
- Rhos-y-waun
- Ridleywood
- Rossett
- Ruabon

== S ==
- Sandy Lane
- Singret
- Sontley
- Southsea
- Stansty
- Strytlydan
- Stryt-yr-hwch
- Summerhill
- Sutton Green
- Sydallt

== T ==
- Tai-nant
- Talwrn
- Tallarn Green
- Tanyfron
- Three Fingers
- Trefechan
- Tregeiriog
- Trevalyn (Trefalun)
- Trevor

== W ==
- Wallington
- Wern
- Whitewell
- Worthenbury
- Wrexham
- Wrexham Industrial Estate

== See also ==
- Lists of places in Wales
- List of electoral wards in Wrexham County Borough
