= 2017 Wrexham County Borough Council election =

Election to Wrexham County Borough Council

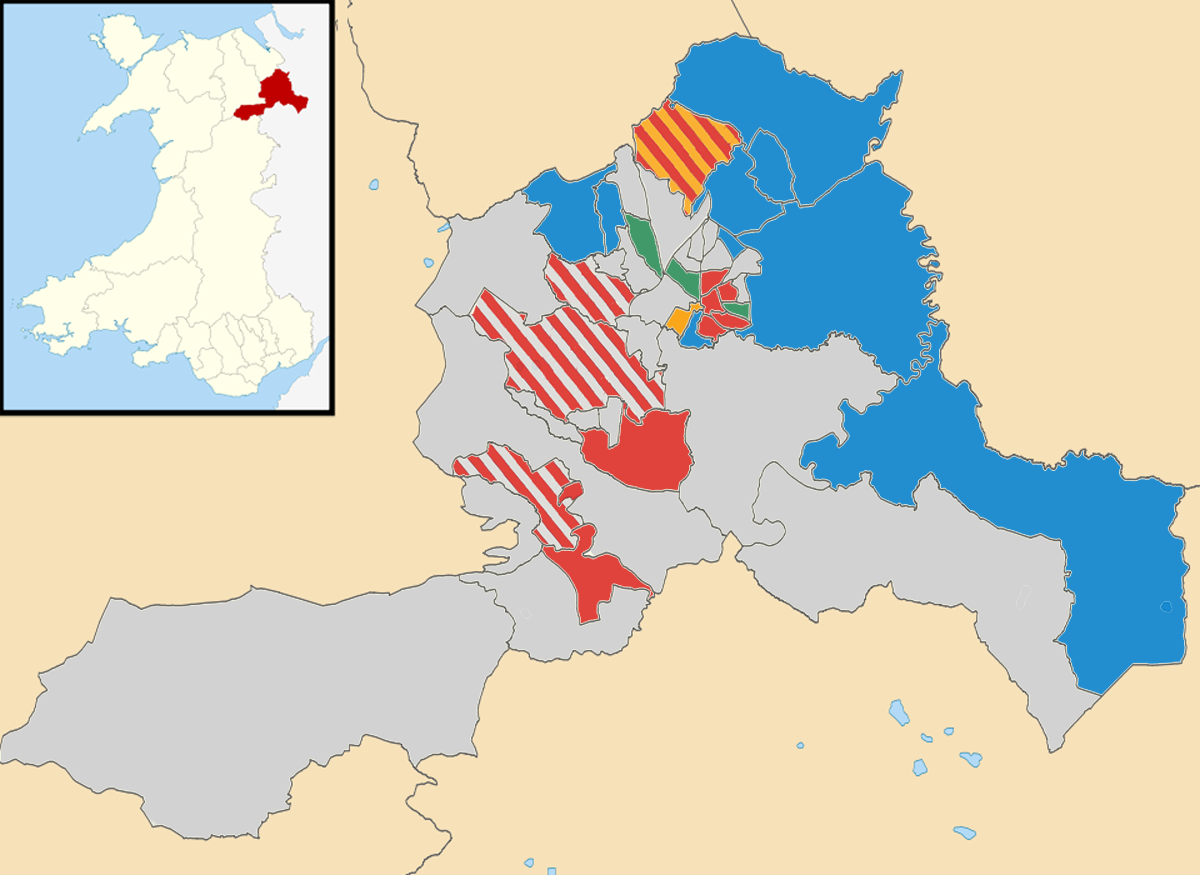
2017 election results map, showing party affiliations of successful councillors (stripes indicate mixed representation)

The 2017 Wrexham County Borough Council election took place on 4 May 2017 to elect members of Wrexham County Borough Council in Wales. This was on the same day as other 2017 United Kingdom local elections. The previous all-council election took place in May 2012.

== Background ==
The Labour Party held power on the council after the 2012 election, but lost it after splitting because of an internal row. Several Labour councillors became independent, allowing the Independent group to take control in alliance with the Conservatives.

In 2017, contests took place in 44 of the 47 wards.

== Results ==
The Independents lost three seats in comparison with their position immediately prior to the election, but remained the largest group. The Conservative group gained four seats. A coalition of the Independent group, the Wrexham Independents group and the Conservatives agreed to run the council for the next 5 years to 2022.

Wrexham Council election 2017
Party	Seats	Gains	Losses	Net gain/loss	Seats %	Votes %	Votes	+/−
Independent	26	10	3	+7	50.0	41.2	16,014	+14.6
Labour	12	3	14	-11	23.0	24.8	9,650	-15.5
Conservative	9	5	1	+4	17.3	17.3	6,730	+3.9
Liberal Democrats	2	1	3	-2	3.8	8.9	3,457	-3.5
Plaid Cymru	3	2	0	+2	5.7	6.9	2,689	0.0
Green	0			0	0.0	0.6	232	+0.4
UKIP	0			0	0.0	0.2	97	0.0
BNP	0			0	0.0	N/A	0	-0.3

== Ward results ==
* = denotes councillor elected to this ward at the 2012 elections

=== Acton (one seat) ===
Acton 2017
Party	Candidate	Votes	%	±%
Independent	Geoff Lowe *	364	45.2	
Labour	Nick Stott	230	28.5	
Plaid Cymru	Shaun Davies	132	16.4	
Liberal Democrats	Gemma Williams	80	9.9	
Majority		134		
Turnout			35.1	
Registered electors		2,307		
Independent gain from Labour		Swing		

Councillor Lowe was elected for the Labour Party in May 2012.

=== Borras Park (one seat) ===
Borras Park 2017
Party	Candidate	Votes	%	±%
Conservative	Debbie Wallice	507	46.3	
Liberal Democrats	Jim Kelly *	276	25.2	
Labour	Nathan Brookfield	195	17.8	
Plaid Cymru	Darren Picken	117	10.7	
Majority		231		
Turnout			55.7	
Registered electors		1,964		
Conservative gain from Liberal Democrats		Swing		

=== Bronington (one seat) ===
Bronington 2017
Party	Candidate	Votes	%	±%
Conservative	Rodney Skelland *	710	66.9	
Independent	Stephen Harvey	190	17.9	
Labour	Kath Goodchild	135	12.7	
Liberal Democrats	Mike Adams	27	2.5	
Majority		520		
Turnout			41.6	
Registered electors		2,554		
Conservative hold		Swing		

=== Brymbo (one seat) ===
Brymbo 2017
Party	Candidate	Votes	%	±%
Conservative	Paul Rogers *	547	50.1	
Labour	Zoe Clarke	447	41.0	
Independent	Adam Davies	97	8.9	
Majority		100		
Turnout			35.5	
Registered electors		3,067		
Conservative hold		Swing		

=== Bryn Cefn (one seat) ===
Bryn Cefn 2017
Party	Candidate	Votes	%	±%
Conservative	Beverley Parry-Jones	215	40.6	
Labour	William Wainwright	129	24.4	
Independent	Rob Jones	83	15.7	
Independent	Barbara Roxburgh *	71	13.4	
Independent	Andrew Humphreys	31	5.9	
Majority		100		
Turnout			35.0	
Registered electors		1,521		
Conservative gain from Labour		Swing		

Barbara Roxburgh was elected for the Labour Party in May 2012.

=== Brynyffynnon (one seat) ===
Brynyffynnon 2017
Party	Candidate	Votes	%	±%
Independent	Phil Wynn *	387	45.4	
Labour	Martin Morris	269	31.6	
Plaid Cymru	Sarah Roberts	196	23.0	
Majority		126		
Turnout			33.0	
Registered electors		2,585		
Independent hold		Swing		

=== Cartrefle (one seat) ===
Cartrefle 2017
Party	Candidate	Votes	%	±%
Independent	Ronnie Prince *	451	73.6	
Plaid Cymru	Bryan Pritchard	99	16.2	
Labour	Brian Halley	63	10.3	
Majority		352		
Turnout			37.6	
Registered electors		1,635		
Independent hold		Swing		

=== Cefn (two seats) ===
Cefn 2017
Party	Candidate	Votes	%	±%
Independent	Sonia Benbow-Jones	579	50.1	
Labour	Derek Wright *	577	49.9	
Labour	Liz Parry	572		
Majority		5		
Turnout			30.1	
Registered electors		3,771		
Independent hold		Swing		
Labour hold		Swing		

=== Ceiriog Valley (one seat) ===
Ceiriog Valley 2017
Party	Candidate	Votes	%	±%
Independent	Trevor Bates	615	60.0	
Plaid Cymru	Anne Morris	198	19.3	
Conservative	John Jenkins	110	10.7	
Independent	Barbara Roberts	102	10.0	
Majority		417		
Turnout			60.5	
Registered electors		1,701		
Independent hold		Swing		

=== Chirk North (One seat) ===
Chirk North 2017
Party	Candidate	Votes	%	±%
Labour	Frank Hemmings	336	50.8	
Independent	Jackie Allen	326	49.2	
Majority		10		
Turnout			36.7	
Registered electors		1,811		
Labour gain from Independent		Swing		

=== Chirk South (One seat) ===
Chirk South 2017
Party	Candidate	Votes	%	±%
Independent	Terry Evans *	518	74.3	
Labour	John Rostron	179	25.7	
Majority		339		
Turnout			61.0	
Registered electors		1,151		
Independent hold		Swing		

=== Coedpoeth (two seats) ===
Coedpoeth 2017
Party	Candidate	Votes	%	±%
Labour	Krista Childs *	603	43.0	
Independent	Michael Dixon	426	30.4	
Labour	Adrian Williams	380		
Liberal Democrats	Graham Kelly	373	26.6	
Majority		46		
Turnout			31.7	
Registered electors		3,532		
Labour hold		Swing		
Independent gain from Labour		Swing		

=== Erddig (one seat) ===
Erddig 2017
Party	Candidate	Votes	%	±%
Conservative	Paul Roberts	228	32.7	
Independent	Alex Jones	138	19.8	
Labour	Matthew Healy	134	19.2	
Independent	Bob Dutton *	109	15.6	
Liberal Democrats	David Jones	89	12.8	
Majority		90		
Turnout			46.2	
Registered electors		1,516		
Conservative gain from Independent		Swing		

=== Esclusham (one seat) ===
Esclusham 2017
Party	Candidate	Votes	%	±%
Independent	Mark Pritchard *	796	79.5	
Plaid Cymru	Katie Courtney	104	10.4	
Labour	Richard Caldecott	101	10.1	
Majority		692		
Turnout			47.5	
Registered electors		2,108		
Independent hold		Swing		

=== Garden Village (one seat) ===
Garden Village 2017
Party	Candidate	Votes	%	±%
Independent	Andy Williams *	943	94.9	
Labour	Wendy O'Grady	51	5.1	
Majority		842		
Turnout			60.2	
Registered electors		1,651		
Independent gain from Labour		Swing		

Councillor Williams was elected for the Labour Party in May 2012.

=== Gresford East and West (one seat) ===
Gresford East and West 2017
Party	Candidate	Votes	%	±%
Conservative	Andrew Atkinson	917	73.0	
Labour	Irene Lewis	204	16.2	
Liberal Democrats	Beryl Blackmore	125	9.9	
UKIP	Jeanette Bassford-Barton	11	0.9	
Majority		713		
Turnout			55.2	
Registered electors		2,288		
Conservative gain from Labour		Swing		

=== Grosvenor (one seat) ===
Grosvenor 2017
Party	Candidate	Votes	%	±%
Plaid Cymru	Marc Jones	260	42.3	
Independent	Stephen Wilson *	185	30.1	
Labour	Ray Floyd	170	27.6	
Majority		75		
Turnout			31.2	
Registered electors		1,975		
Plaid Cymru gain from Labour		Swing		

Wilson was elected for the Labour Party at the previous election in 2012.

=== Gwenfro (one seat) ===
Gwenfro 2017
Party	Candidate	Votes	%	±%
Independent	Nigel Williams	170	42.8	
Independent	Philip Williams	89	22.4	
Labour	Daniel Commins	86	21.7	
Independent	Damian Conde	52	13.1	
Majority		81		
Turnout			32.0	
Registered electors		1,244		
Independent gain from Labour		Swing		

=== Gwersyllt East and South (two seats) ===
Gwersyllt East and South 2017
Party	Candidate	Votes	%	±%
Independent	David Griffiths *	826	64.5	
Independent	Tina Mannering	531		
Independent	Bernie McCann *	508		
Labour	Michael Mackenzie	454	35.5	
Majority		23		
Turnout			37.4	
Registered electors		3,672		
Independent gain from Labour		Swing		
Independent gain from Labour		Swing		

Griffiths and McCann was elected for the Labour Party at the previous election, in 2012.

=== Gwersyllt North (one seat) ===
Gwersyllt North 2017
Party	Candidate	Votes	%	±%
Independent	Barrie Warburton	282	39.8	
Labour	Ben Whitehouse	195	27.5	
Conservative	Julian Wright	142	20.1	
Independent	Fred Roberts	89	12.6	
Majority		87		
Turnout			34.8	
Registered electors		2,048		
Independent gain from Labour		Swing		

=== Gwersyllt West (one seat) ===
Gwersyllt West 2017
Party	Candidate	Votes	%	±%
Plaid Cymru	Gwenfair Jones	428	54.7	
Labour	David Edwards	225	28.7	
Conservative	Melissa Smillie	130	16.6	
Majority		203		
Turnout			35.6	
Registered electors		2,205		
Plaid Cymru hold		Swing		

=== Hermitage (one seat) ===
Hermitage 2017
Party	Candidate	Votes	%	±%
Labour	Graham Rogers *	447	68.3	
Plaid Cymru	Jamie Hack	207	31.7	
Majority		240		
Turnout			32.1	
Registered electors		2,048		
Labour hold		Swing		

=== Holt (one seat) ===
Holt 2017
Party	Candidate	Votes	%	±%
Conservative	Michael Morris *	601	63.1	
Labour	Jim Duffy	351	36.9	
Majority		250		
Turnout			37.9	
Registered electors		2,533		
Conservative hold		Swing		

=== Johnstown (one seat) ===
Johnstown 2017
Party	Candidate	Votes	%	±%
Independent	David Bithell *	827	76.1	
Labour	Ethan Jones	260	23.9	
Turnout			44.1	
Registered electors		2,466		
Independent hold		Swing		

=== Little Acton (one seat) ===
Little Acton 2017
Party	Candidate	Votes	%	±%
Independent	William Baldwin *	unopposed		
Independent hold		Swing		

=== Llangollen Rural (one seat) ===
Llangollen Rural 2017
Party	Candidate	Votes	%	±%
Independent	Rondo Roberts	326	45.4	
Independent	Timothy Hodkinson	229	31.9	
Conservative	Gareth Baines	148	20.6	
UKIP	Jeanie Barton	15	2.1	
Majority		97		
Turnout			45.8	
Registered electors		1,579		
Independent hold		Swing		

=== Llay (two seats) ===
Llay 2017
Party	Candidate	Votes	%	±%
Liberal Democrats	Rob Walsh	1,111	51.8	
Labour	Bryan Apsley	553	25.8	
Liberal Democrats	Ian Edwards	465		
Independent	Terry Boland *	228	13.4	
Conservative	Anthony Fontes	122	5.7	
Independent	Gary Hall	104		
Conservative	Hannah Jones	94		
UKIP	Nathan Hughes	71	3.3	
Independent	Victoria Jones	24		
Majority		88		
Turnout			45.3	
Registered electors		3,564		
Liberal Democrats gain from Labour		Swing		
Labour hold		Swing		

Terry Boland was elected for the Labour Party at the previous ward election, in May 2012.

=== Maesydre (one seat) ===
Maesydre 2017
Party	Candidate	Votes	%	±%
Labour	Paul Jones	249	44.1	+20.2
Conservative	Victoria Clements	137	24.3	+16.2
Liberal Democrats	Aimi Waters	119	21.1	−22.7
Independent	Phil Lloyd	59	10.5	−13.7
Majority		112		
Turnout			37.6	
Registered electors		1,500		
Labour gain from Liberal Democrats		Swing		

=== Marchwiel (one seat) ===
Marchwiel 2017
Party	Candidate	Votes	%	±%
Independent	John Pritchard *	unopposed		
Independent hold		Swing		

=== Marford and Hoseley (one seat) ===
Marford and Hoseley 2017
Party	Candidate	Votes	%	±%
Conservative	Russell Gilmartin	548	59.7	+31.0
Liberal Democrats	Julie Blackmore	193	21.0	−36.3
Labour	John Henry	128	13.9	−0.1
Independent	James Hobbley	38	4.1	+4.1
Independent	Charles Dodman	11	1.2	+1.2
Majority		355		
Turnout			50.6	
Registered electors		1,817		
Conservative gain from Liberal Democrats		Swing		

=== Minera (one seat) ===
Minera 2017
Party	Candidate	Votes	%	±%
Independent	David Kelly *	unopposed		
Independent hold		Swing		

=== New Broughton (one seat) ===
New Broughton 2017
Party	Candidate	Votes	%	±%
Independent	Alan Edwards	544	72.4	
Green	Duncan Rees	207	27.6	
Majority		337		
Turnout			26.5	
Registered electors		2,850		
Independent hold		Swing		

=== Offa (one seat) ===
Offa 2017
Party	Candidate	Votes	%	±%
Liberal Democrats	Alun Jenkins	267	45.0	
Plaid Cymru	Phil Phillips	164	27.7	
Conservative	Merril Wolfson	54	9.1	
Independent	Steven Vale	43	7.3	
Independent	Joanna Kinch	40	6.7	
Green	Alan Butterworth	25	4.2	
Majority		103		
Turnout			35.1	
Registered electors		1,695		
Liberal Democrats hold		Swing		

=== Overton (one seat) ===
Overton 2017
Party	Candidate	Votes	%	±%
Independent	John McCusker	613	52.8	
Conservative	Lloyd Kenyon *	373	32.1	
Independent	Richard Hobson	113	9.7	
Independent	Richard Hobson	62	5.3	
Majority		240		
Turnout			44.1	
Registered electors		2,636		
Independent gain from Conservative		Swing		

=== Pant (one seat) ===
Pant 2017
Party	Candidate	Votes	%	±%
Independent	David Maddocks	228	33.8	
Independent	Martin Jones	221	32.7	
Labour	Stella Matthews	194	28.7	
Independent	Paula Williams	32	4.7	
Majority		7		
Turnout			43.9	
Registered electors		1,543		
Independent hold		Swing		

=== Penycae (one seat) ===
Penycae 2017
Party	Candidate	Votes	%	±%
Independent	John Phillips *	616	88.0	
Plaid Cymru	Aled Powell	84	12.0	
Majority		532		
Turnout			45.5	
Registered electors		1,565		
Independent hold		Swing		

=== Penycae and Ruabon South (one seat) ===
Penycae and Ruabon South 2017
Party	Candidate	Votes	%	±%
Independent	Joan Lowe *	451	57.4	
Labour	Callum Edwards	335	42.6	
Majority		116		
Turnout			41.1	
Registered electors		1,932		
Independent hold		Swing		

=== Plas Madoc (one seat) ===
Plas Madoc 2017
Party	Candidate	Votes	%	±%
Labour	Paul Blackwell *	184	56.4	
Independent	Amanda Bradley	115	35.3	
Independent	Alan Ennis	27	8.3	
Majority		69		
Turnout			26.6	
Registered electors		1,237		
Labour hold		Swing		

=== Ponciau (two seats) ===
Ponciau 2017
Party	Candidate	Votes	%	±%
Independent	Paul Pemberton *	970	43.8	
Labour	Kevin Hughes *	649	29.3	
Liberal Democrats	Aled Roberts	597	26.9	
Majority		52		
Turnout			41.9	
Registered electors		3,506		
Independent hold		Swing		
Labour hold		Swing		

=== Queensway (one seat) ===
Queensway 2017
Party	Candidate	Votes	%	±%
Plaid Cymru	Carrie Harper	225	53.7	
Labour	Colin Powell *	179	42.7	
Independent	Jorge Szabo	15	3.6	
Majority		46		
Turnout			27.3	
Registered electors		1,546		
Plaid Cymru gain from Labour		Swing		

=== Rhosnesni (one seat) ===
Rhosnesni 2017
Party	Candidate	Votes	%	±%
Independent	Mike Davies	369	31.4	
Labour	Anne Evans *	290	24.6	
Conservative	Sarah Atherton	285	21.2	
Independent	Peter Jones	233	19.8	
Majority		79		
Turnout			40.8	
Registered electors		2,870		
Independent gain from Labour		Swing		

=== Rossett (one seat) ===
Rossett 2017
Party	Candidate	Votes	%	±%
Conservative	Hugh Jones	946	82.5	+5.1
Liberal Democrats	Glenda Kelly	200	17.5	−5.1
Majority		746		
Turnout			44.0	
Registered electors		2,615		
Conservative hold		Swing		

=== Ruabon (one seat) ===
Ruabon 2017
Party	Candidate	Votes	%	±%
Labour	Dana Davies	242	27.8	
Independent	Charles Devlin	225	25.8	
Plaid Cymru	Pol Wong	212	24.3	
Independent	Sharon Mazzarella	193	22.1	
Majority		17		
Turnout			40.8	
Registered electors		2,154		
Labour hold		Swing		

=== Smithfield (one seat) ===
Smithfield 2017
Party	Candidate	Votes	%	±%
Labour	Adrienne Jeorrett	135	28.2	
Plaid Cymru	Paul Williams	125	26.1	
Independent	Jayne Johnson	120	25.1	
Independent	Richard Bennett	74	15.4	
Independent	David Foulds	25	5.2	
Majority		10		
Turnout			27.4	
Registered electors		1,756		
Labour gain from Independent		Swing		

=== Stansty (one seat) ===
Stansty 2017
Party	Candidate	Votes	%	±%
Independent	David Bithell	877	92.6	
Labour	Steve Gittins	60	6.3	
Conservative	Luke Caldecott	10	1.1	
Majority		817		
Turnout			55.2	
Registered electors		1,719		
Independent gain from Labour		Swing		

=== Whitegate (one seat) ===
Whitegate 2017
Party	Candidate	Votes	%	±%
Labour	Brian Cameron	377	73.2	
Plaid Cymru	Iolanda Viegas	138	26.8	
Majority		239		
Turnout			28.6	
Registered electors		1,831		
Labour hold		Swing		

=== Wynnstay (one seat) ===
Wynnstay 2017
Party	Candidate	Votes	%	±%
Labour	Malcolm King	234	67.8	
Independent	James Stevens	111	32.2	
Majority		123		
Turnout			25.7	
Registered electors		1,349		
Labour hold		Swing		

== Changes 2017–2022 ==
On 28 November 2018 Councillor Paul Rogers left the Conservative Group to become non-aligned. He then went on to join the Independent group on 15 May 2019. On 7 November 2019, Councillor Ronnie Prince also joined the main Independent group having been non-aligned since the last election. Independent councillor for Gwersyllt North, Barrie Warburton, resigned his seat on 16 January 2020, and was subsequently replaced by Plaid Cymru's Phil Rees who won the by-election on Thursday 27 February. On 29 September 2020 Paul Jones, Labour Councillor for Maesydre, resigned his seat for personal reasons, he was replaced by Plaid Cymru's Becca Martin in a by-election on 18 March 2021.
