= Wrexham County Borough Council =

Local government authority in north-east Wales

Wrexham County Borough Council Cyngor Bwrdeistref Sirol Wrecsam (Welsh)

Type
- Type: Principal council of Wrexham County Borough

History
- Founded: 1 April 1996
- Preceded by: Clwyd County Council; Wrexham Maelor

Leadership
- Mayor: Jeremy Kent, Conservative since 19 May 2026
- Leader: Mark Pritchard, Independent since 24 September 2014
- Chief Executive: Alwyn Jones since 1 January 2025

Structure
- Seats: 56 councillors
- Graph of the party split among 56 seats.
- Political groups: Administration (30) Conservative (7) Liberal Democrats (1) Independent (22) Other parties (26) Labour (14) Plaid Cymru (7) Reform (1) TUSC (1) Independent (3)
- Length of term: 5 years

Elections
- Voting system: First-past-the-post
- Last election: 5 May 2022
- Next election: 6 May 2027

Meeting place
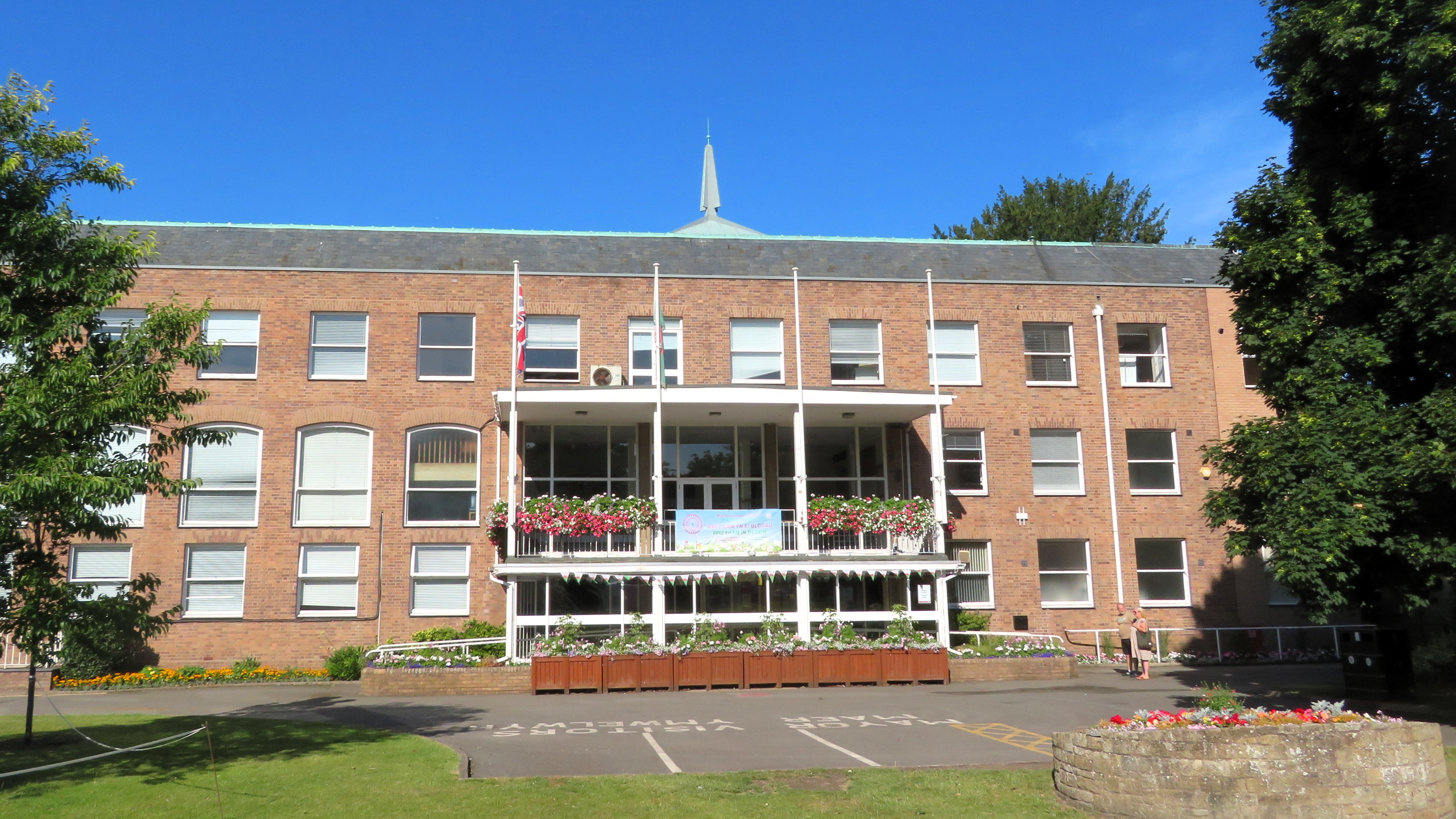
- Guildhall, Wrexham, LL11 1AY

Website
- www.wrexham.gov.uk

Wrexham County Borough Council (Welsh: Cyngor Bwrdeistref Sirol Wrecsam) is the local authority for the city and county borough of Wrexham, one of the principal areas of Wales. Located in North Wales, it covers Wrexham and the surrounding area.

== History ==
Wrexham County Borough Council was created in 1996 under the Local Government (Wales) Act 1994. The new county borough of Wrexham covered all of the district of Wrexham Maelor and a small part of the Glyndŵr district, both of which were part of the county of Clwyd. On 1 April 1996 the new Wrexham County Borough Council took over the county-level functions previously performed by Clwyd County Council and the district-level functions from the two district councils, which were abolished.

On 1 September 2022 the county borough was awarded city status, but the council continues to style itself "Wrexham County Borough Council".

In November 2023, a councillor's annual basic salary was £17,600, with the council proposing an increase of 6% to £18,666.

== Political control ==
The council has been under no overall control since 1999. Since the 2022 election the council has been led by a coalition of the "Independent Group", comprising 21 of the independent councillors, and the Conservatives. The council's one Liberal Democrat councillor joined the administration in December 2022.

The first election to the new council was held in 1995, initially operating as a shadow authority before coming into its powers on 1 April 1996. Political control of the council since 1996 has been as follows:

Party in control	Years
Labour	1996–1999
No overall control	1999–present

=== Leadership ===
The role of Mayor of Wrexham is largely ceremonial. Political leadership is instead provided by the leader of the council. The leaders since 1996 have been:

Councillor	Party	From	To
Warren Coleman	Labour	1 Apr 1996	May 1997
Malcolm King	Labour	21 May 1997	May 1998
Neil Rogers	Labour	6 May 1998	May 2000
Shân Wilkinson	Labour	17 May 2000	Jun 2004
Neil Rogers	Labour	23 Jun 2004	9 Mar 2005
Aled Roberts	Liberal Democrats	9 Mar 2005	May 2011
Ron Davies	Liberal Democrats	18 May 2011	May 2012
Neil Rogers	Labour	23 May 2012	2 Sep 2014
Neil Rogers	Independent	2 Sep 2014	24 Sep 2014
Mark Pritchard	Independent	24 Sep 2014	

=== Composition ===
Following the 2022 election and subsequent changes up to October 2026, the composition of the council was:

Party	Seats
Labour	14
Conservative	7
Plaid Cymru	7
Reform	1
TUSC	1
Liberal Democrats	1
Independent	25
Total	56

The Liberal Democrat and 22 of the independents sit together as the "Independent Group". This group and the Conservatives together form the council's administration. The TUSC councillor and another independent sit together as the "Progressive Independent" group. The other two independents and the Reform councillor are not aligned to any group. The next election is due in 2027.

== Elections ==
Since 2012, elections have taken place every five years. The last election was 5 May 2022.

Year	Seats	Independent	Labour	Plaid Cymru	Conservative	Liberal Democrats	Notes
1995	51	11 (Note: Includes three candidates elected as Independent Labour.)	**33**	0	3	4	Labour majority control
1999	52	15 (Note: Includes five candidates elected as Independent Labour.)	**26**	0	4	7	New ward boundaries.
2004	52	**20** (Note: Includes one candidate elected to represent Forward Wales.)	19	0	3	10	
2008	52	**20**	11	4	5	12	
2012	52	19	**23**	1	5	4	
2017	52	**26**	12	3	9	2	
2022	56	**23**	14	9	9	1	No overall control; Independent / Conservative coalition. New ward boundaries.

Party with the most elected councillors in bold. Coalition agreements in notes column.

== Premises ==
The council is based at the Guildhall off Rhosddu Road in the centre of Wrexham, overlooking the open space of Llwyn Isaf. The Guildhall was built between 1959 and 1961 for the original Wrexham Borough Council. It subsequently served as the headquarters of Wrexham Maelor Borough Council between 1974 and 1996, when the current Wrexham County Borough Council was created.

== Electoral divisions ==
Electoral divisions in Wrexham County Borough from May 2022

The county borough is divided into forty-nine electoral wards returning fifty-six councillors. There are 35 communities in the county borough, some of which have their own elected council.

Electoral wards for Wrexham County Borough Council
Electoral ward (2022–)	Welsh name (if applicable)	No. of councillors	Communities and community council wards (Note: All wards listed in this column are referring to the community electoral wards for their respective community councils. These wards are within the brackets following the name of the community. Many community wards share names with current and former county borough council electoral wards.)	Councillor elected in May 2022 election
Acrefair North	Gogledd Acre-fair	1	Cefn (Plas Madoc community ward and Acrefair and Penybryn community ward)	Paul Blackwell (Labour)
Acton and Maesydre	Gwaunyterfyn a Maes-y-dre	2	Acton (Acton Central, Acton Park and Maesydre community wards)	Becca Martin (Plaid Cymru) Corin Jarvis (Labour)
Bangor Is-y-Coed	Bangor-is-y-coed	1	Bangor Is-y-Coed Willington Worthenbury (Willington and Worthenbury wards)	Robert Ian Williams (Conservative)
Borras Park	Parc Borras	1	Acton (Borras Park ward)	Debbie Wallice (Conservative)
Bronington and Hanmer	Bronington a Hanmer	1	Bronington (Bronington, Iscoyd and Tybroughton community wards) Hanmer (Halghton and Hanmer community wards)	Jeremy Alexander Newton (Conservative)
Brymbo		2	Brymbo (Brymbo ward and Vron ward)	Paul Rogers (Independent) Gary Brown (Labour)
Bryn Cefn		1	Broughton (Bryn Cefn ward and parts of Brynteg ward)	Beverley Parry-Jones (Conservative)
Brynyffynnon		1	Offa (Part of Brynffynon and Offa community wards)	Phill Wynn (Independent)
Cartrefle		1	Caia Park (Cartrefle ward)	Ronnie Prince (Independent)
Cefn East	Dwyrain Cefn	1	Cefn (Parts of Cefn community ward, and Rhosymedre and Cefn Bychan community ward)	Derek William Wright (Labour)
Cefn West	Gorllewin Cefn	1	Cefn (Part of Acrefair and Penybryn ward, and parts of Rhosymedre and Cefn community wards)	Stella Matthews (Labour)
Chirk North	Gogledd y Waun	1	Chirk (North ward)	Frank Hemmings (Labour)
Chirk South	De'r Waun	1	Chirk (South ward)	Terry Evans (Independent)
Coedpoeth	Coed-poeth	2	Coedpoeth	Krista Childs (Labour) Anthony Wedlake (Labour)
Dyffryn Ceiriog		1	Ceiriog Ucha; Glyntraian; Llansantffraid (or Llansanffraid) Glyn Ceiriog	Trevor Raymond Bates (Independent)
Erddig		1	Offa (Erddig ward and part of Offa ward)	Paul Anthony Roberts (Conservative)
Esclusham		1	Esclusham (Bersham and Rhostyllen wards)	Mark Pritchard (Independent)
Garden Village (Note: "Pentre Yr Ardd", with "Yr" capitalised in source, was a name suggested by Wrexham County Borough Council for the electoral ward. However, this recommendation was not applied, English name "Garden Village" is used in Welsh, following the Welsh Language Commissioner's standardisation policy, as the commissioner stated they have no evidence of a used Welsh name for the settlement.)		1	Rhosddu (Garden Village ward)	Andy Williams (Independent)
Gresford East and West	Dwyrain a Gorllewin Gresffordd	1	Gresford (East and West wards)	Jeremy Kent (Conservative)
Grosvenor		1	Rhosddu (Grosvenor ward)	Marc Jones (Plaid Cymru)
Gwenfro		1	Broughton (Gwenfro ward and parts of New Broughton and Brynteg community wards)	Nigel Williams (Independent)
Gwersyllt East	Dwyrain Gwersyllt	1	Gwersyllt (East ward and parts of South ward)	Tina Mannering (Independent)
Gwersyllt North	Gogledd Gwersyllt	1	Gwersyllt (North ward)	Emma Holland (Plaid Cymru)
Gwersyllt South	De Gwersyllt	1	Gwersyllt (Part of South ward)	Peter Howell (Plaid Cymru)
Gwersyllt West	Gorllewin Gwersyllt	1	Gwersyllt (West ward)	Annette Davies (Plaid Cymru)
Hermitage		1	Offa (Hermitage ward)	Graham Rogers (Labour)
Holt		1	Holt (entire community) Abenbury (part) Isycoed (part)	Michael Morris (Conservative)
Little Acton	Acton Fechan	1	Acton (Little Acton ward)	Bill Baldwin (Independent)
Llangollen Rural	Llangollen Wledig	1	Llangollen Rural	Rondo Roberts (Independent)
Llay	Llai	2	Llay	Rob Walsh (Independent) Bryan Apsley (Labour)
Marchwiel (Note: The Welsh name Marchwiail was proposed by the LDBCW to be the name for the ward in both Welsh and English, but rejected by the Welsh Government in July 2021. The ward would be known as Marchwiel in both Welsh and English.)		1	Erbistock Marchwiel Sesswick	John Pritchard (Independent)
Marford and Hoseley	Marford a Hoseley	1	Gresford (Marford and Hoseley ward)	Beryl Blackmore (Liberal Democrats)
Minera	Mwynglawdd (Note: Initially proposed as Y Mwynglawdd by the LDBCW, rejected by the Welsh Government in July 2021 for Mwynglawdd.)	1	Minera; Brymbo (Bwlchgwyn ward)	Jerry Wellens (Labour)
New Broughton		1	Broughton (Parts of Brynteg and New Broughton community wards)	Claire Lovett (Independent)
Offa		1	Offa (Part of Offa community ward and Brynyffynnon community ward)	Katie Wilkinson (Plaid Cymru)
Overton and Maelor South	Owrtyn a De Maelor	1	Overton Maelor South (Penley and Bettisfield wards)	John Bernard McCusker (Independent)
Pant and Johnstown	Pant a Johnstown	2	Rhosllanerchrugog(Johnstown community ward and Pant community ward)	Steve Joe Jones (Independent) David A Bithell (Independent)
Penycae	Pen-y-cae	1	Penycae (Eitha ward)	John Conrad Phillips (Independent)
Penycae and Ruabon South	Pen-y-cae a De Rhiwabon	1	Pen-y-Cae (Groes ward); Ruabon (South ward)	Alison Tynan (Independent)
Ponciau		1	Esclusham ( Pentrebychan ward) Rhosllanerchrugog (parts of Ponciau North, and Ponciau South wards)	Paul Pemberton (Independent)
Queensway		1	Caia Park (Queensway ward)	Carrie Harper (Plaid Cymru)
Rhos		1	Esclusham (Aberoer ward) Rhosllanerchrugog (Rhos ward; parts of Ponciau North and Ponciau South wards)	Fred Roberts (Independent)
Rhosnesni		2	Acton (Rhosnesni community ward)	Mike Davies (Independent) Andy Gallanders (Plaid Cymru)
Rossett	Yr Orsedd	2	Rossett (Allington and Burton wards)	Hugh Jones (Conservative) Ross Edward Shepherd (Conservative)
Ruabon	Rhiwabon	1	Ruabon (North ward)	Dana Davies (Labour)
Smithfield		1	Caia Park (Part of Smithfield ward and part of Whitegate ward)	Paul Williams (Plaid Cymru)
Stansty		1	Rhosddu (Stansty ward)	David Bithell (Independent)
Whitegate		1	Caia Park (Part of Whitegate ward and Abenbury ward)	Brian Paterson Cameron (Labour)
Wynnstay		1	Caia Park (Wynnstay community ward and parts of Smithfield community ward)	Malcolm Christopher King (Labour)

== See also ==
- Mayor of Wrexham
- List of places in Wrexham County Borough
- Wrexham Maelor Council (pre-1996)
