= 2012 Wrexham County Borough Council election =

Welsh council election

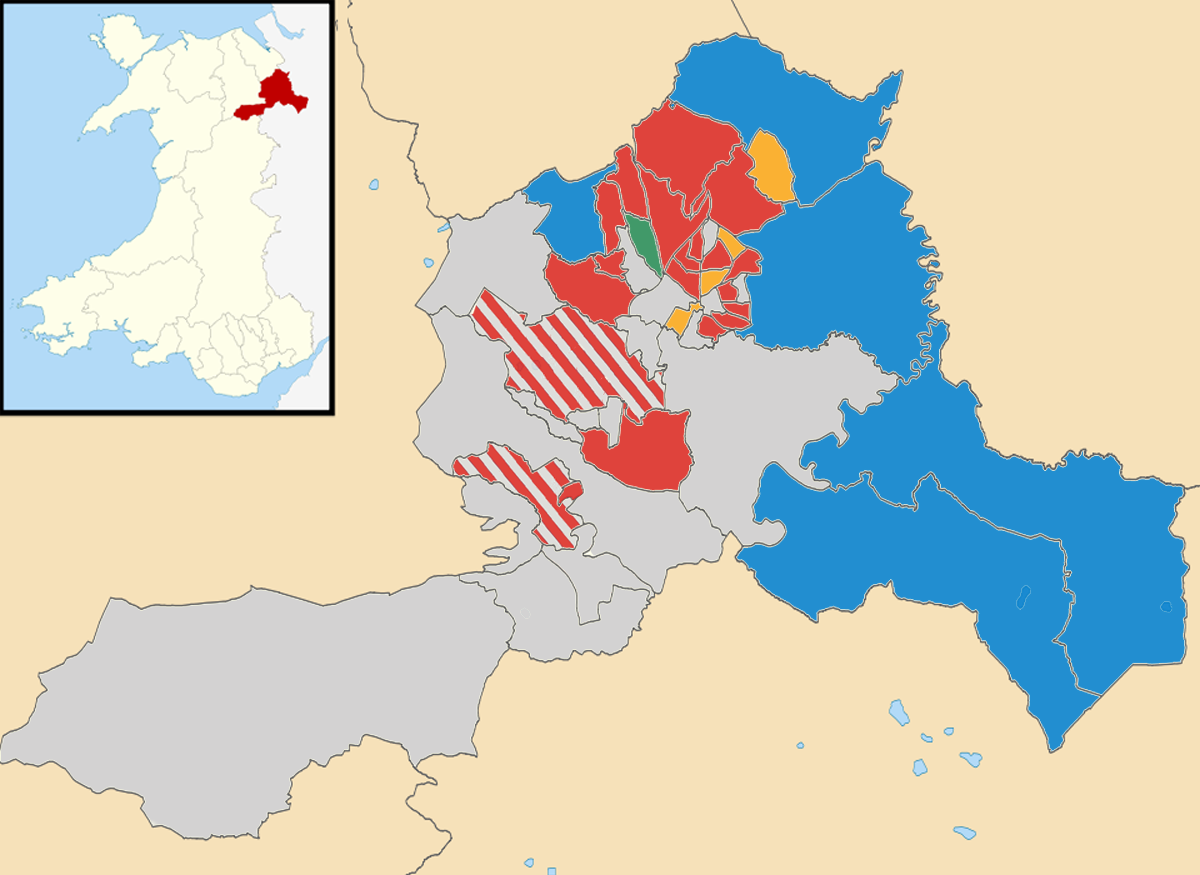
2012 election results map, showing party affiliations of successful councillors (stripes indicate mixed representation)

The 2012 Wrexham County Borough Council election took place on 3 May 2012 to elect members of Wrexham County Borough Council in Wales. This was on the same day as other 2012 United Kingdom local elections. The previous all-council elections took place in 2008 and the next elections took place in May 2017.

== Background ==
Prior to the election no party or group had overall control. The council had been run by an all-party coalition.

== Results ==
No group gained a majority after the election, though Labour gained 10 seats while the Liberal Democrats lost seven seats, including that of their group leader, Ron Davies, who was also leader of the council. Labour planned to discuss forming a coalition with the Independents.

Wrexham Council election 2012
Party	Seats	Gains	Losses	Net gain/loss	Seats %	Votes %	Votes	+/−
Labour	23			+12	44.2	40.3	13,642	+12.0
Independent	19			-1	36.5	26.6	9,045	-5.3
Conservative	5			0	9.6	13.4	4,557	+0.8
Liberal Democrats	4			-8	7.7	12.4	4,204	-8.6
Plaid Cymru	1			-3	1.9	6.9	2,355	+3.3
BNP	0			0	0.0	0.3	110	-1.6
UKIP	0			0	0.0	0.2	65	New
