= Garden Village, Wrexham =

Suburb and ward of Wrexham, Wales

Coordinates: 53.061°N 2.995°W

Garden Village
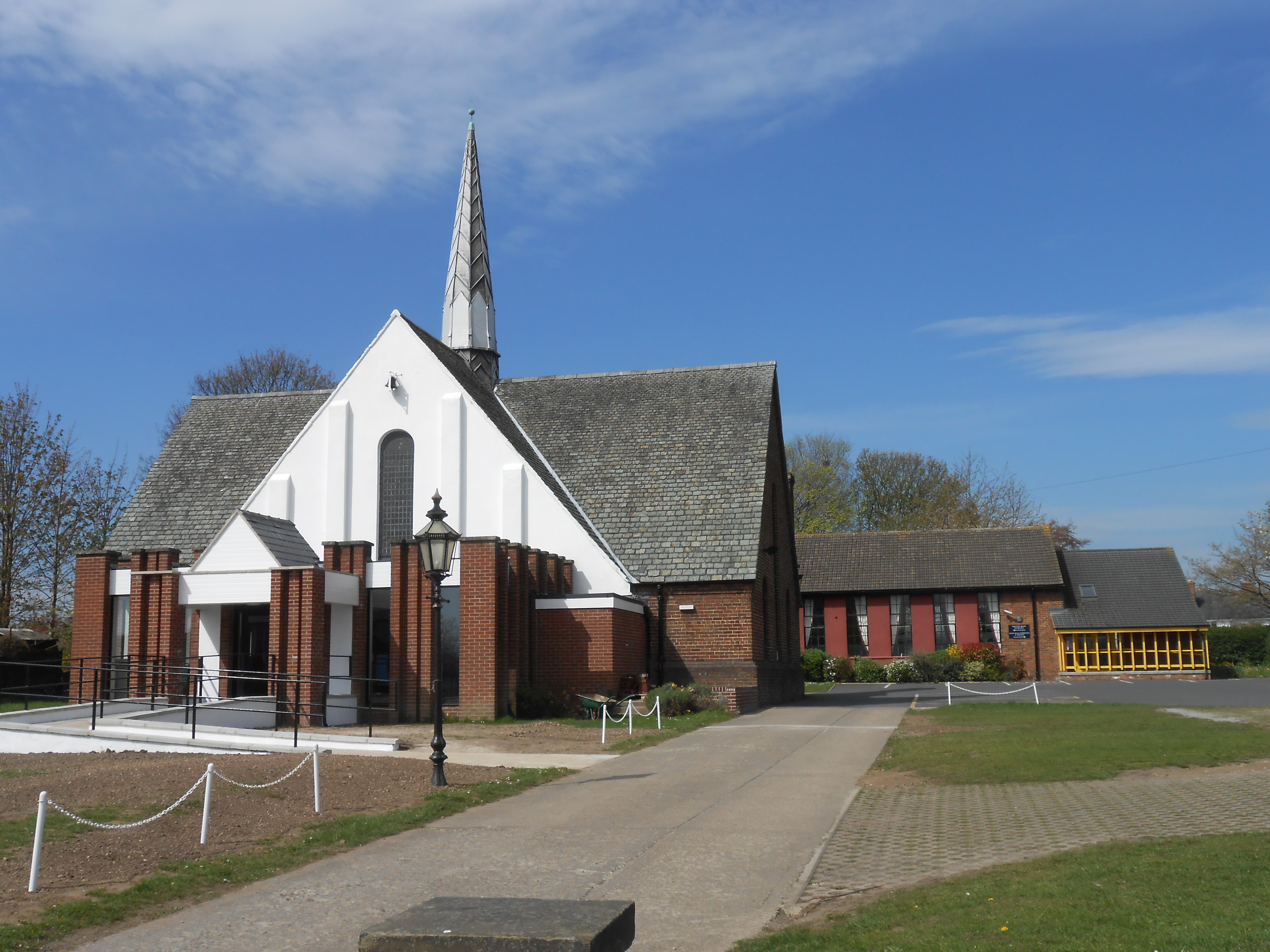
- St Margaret's church, Garden Village

- Location within Wrexham
- Population: 2,035 (2011)
- OS grid reference: SJ332520
- Community: Rhosddu
- Principal area: Wrexham
- Country: Wales
- Sovereign state: United Kingdom
- Post town: WREXHAM
- Postcode district: LL11
- Dialling code: 01978
- Police: North Wales
- Fire: North Wales
- Ambulance: Welsh
- UK Parliament: Wrexham
- Senedd Cymru – Welsh Parliament: Wrexham

Location of the Garden Village electoral ward in Wrexham County Borough, Wales

Garden Village is a suburb of the city of Wrexham and an electoral division (ward) in the community of Rhosddu in Wrexham County Borough, Wales. The population of the ward at the 2011 census was 2,035 It lies to the west of Chester Road and borders the wards of Stansty to the south and east, Gwersyllt East and South to the north west, Little Acton and Acton to the west, and a small section of Gresford to the north.

== History ==
The land in which 'Garden Village' was built on was originally named 'Mass & Pentre' which was situated South-West of Stansty Hall (which was demolished to give way for new housing around Snowdon Drive).

At the start of the 20th century, housing in many areas of Wrexham was of poor quality and, with the increase in industry locally, in short supply.

The development of Garden Village began with the purchase of some 200 acres (81 hectares) of land from Sir Foster Cunliffe near to the estate of Acton by the Welsh Town Planning and Housing Trust Limited.

The intention was to provide affordable housing to workers coming to Wrexham to work in the expanding industries of coal and iron. Gresford Colliery had recently been opened where it was expected that approximately 3,000 men would be employed in the next two years.

A Co-partnership Housing Society was set up in 1913 called Wrexham Tenants Limited, with Lord Kenyon, Mr. David Davies, M.P., and others as Directors to build the houses, while the Trust would build the roads and supervise the development of the estate.

The original plan, by the architect GL Sutcliffe was to provide a village institute, two places of worship, a school and plenty of open spaces and recreation grounds. The design was inspired by the Garden City Movement and was planned as a Garden Suburb. In the first year, 44 properties were completed; numbers 63-69 Acton Gate, numbers 149–167, Chester Road (originally called Bryn Acton) and Cunliffe Walk. These first house were designed by Sutcliffe and the remaining 205 by Thomas Alwyn Lloyd, architect to the trust.

One of the pioneering features of the development was that the tenants were also investors in the Company thus ensuring control of future development.

Unfortunately, with the advent of World War I, the development lost impetus and no further development was undertaken by Wrexham Tenants Limited. The planned shops, churches, institute and school were never built, although St Margaret's church was built in 1928, partly to the original design of Thomas Alwyn Lloyd.

In 1955, Wrexham Tenants Limited was wound up and the properties sold to the tenants at greatly reduced prices of between £250 and £450.

The ward was proposed to be called "Pentre Yr Ardd" in Welsh by Wrexham County Borough Council for the electoral ward in the final recommendations report. The suggestion was not applied, with "Garden Village" used in Welsh, following the Welsh Language Commissioner's standardisation policy, as the commissioner stated they have no evidence of a used Welsh name for the settlement.

== Schools ==
- Wat's Dyke Primary School

== Churches ==
- St Margaret's Church
- Bethel Chapel
