= Borras Park =

Suburb and electoral ward in Wrexham, Wales

Coordinates: 53.062°N 2.973°W

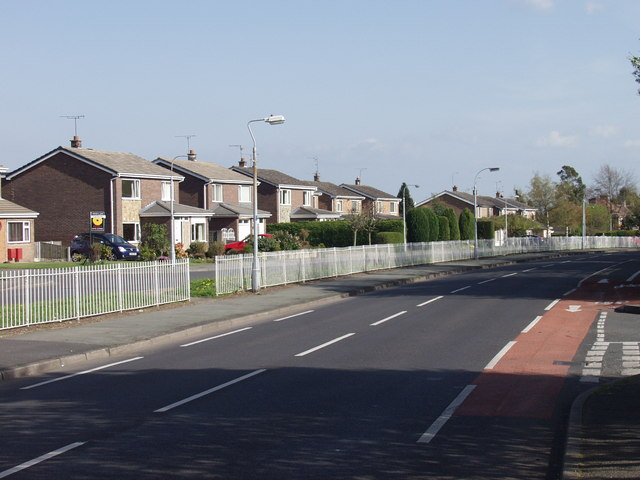
Jeffreys Road, Borras Park

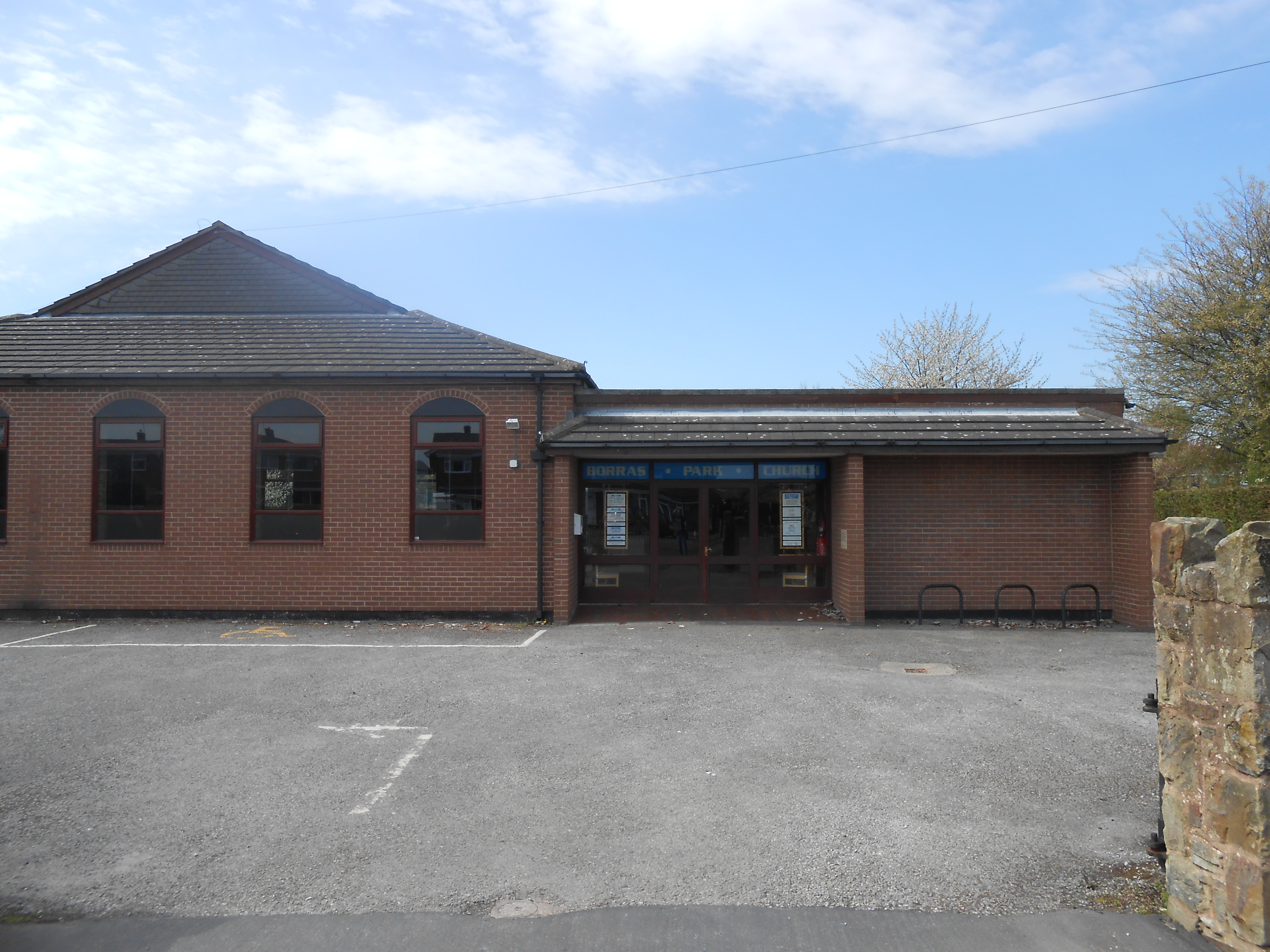
Borras Park Church, Jeffreys Road, Wrexham, Wales

Location of the Borras Park electoral ward in Wrexham County Borough, Wales

Borras Park (Welsh: Parc Borras) is a suburb and electoral ward in the community of Acton, Wrexham, Wrexham County Borough, Wales. The name is derived from the nearby hamlet of Borras.

At the time of the 2001 Census, the population was 2,517 in 1,065 household, reducing to a population of 2,359 at the 2011 Census.

== Religion ==
At the time of the 2011 Census, it was reported as being the ward with the highest proportion in Wales of people describing themselves as Christian (76.1%). The ward itself contains one church, namely Borras Park Evangelical Church, with two others, namely St. John's Church of Wales and Rhosnesni Methodist church, within a few hundred yards of the ward boundary.

== Schools ==
- Barker's Lane Primary School
- Borras Park Primary School (Note: The schools are not actually in Borras Park, but serve the area.)
- Ysgol Llan-y-pwll

== Sport ==
There are two football teams based in Borras Park, Borras Park Albion F.C., founded in 1980, who play in the Wrexham and District Youth League and the Welsh National League (Wrexham Area), and Borras Park Rangers, founded in 2002, who play in the Wrexham and District Youth League.
