= Acton, Wrexham =

Community in Wrexham County Borough, Wales

Acton
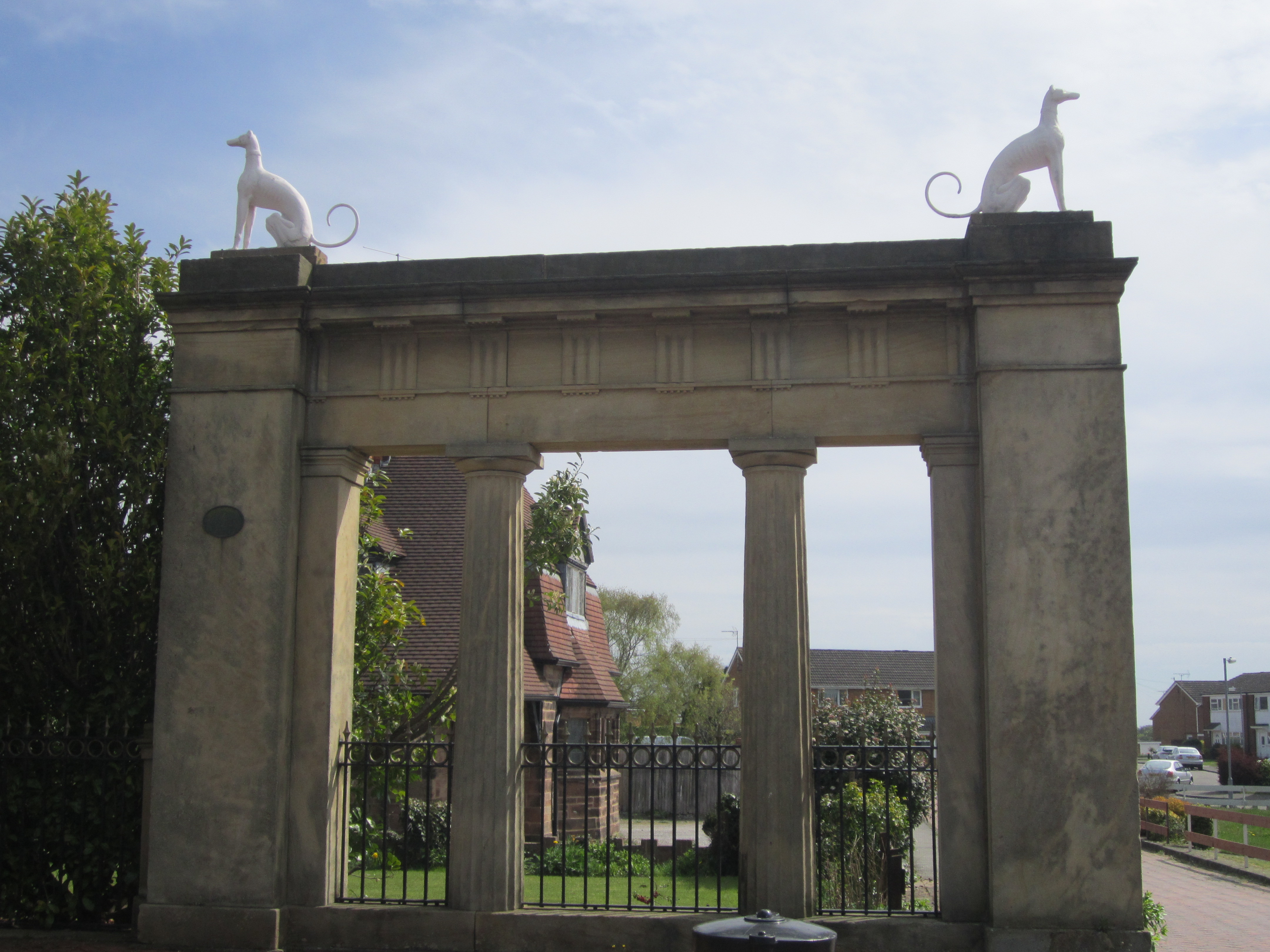
- A portion of 'Acton Park' estate gates, built 1820

- Location within Wrexham
- Population: 13,479 (2011 Census)
- OS grid reference: SJ342519
- Principal area: Wrexham
- Preserved county: Clwyd
- Country: Wales
- Sovereign state: United Kingdom
- Post town: WREXHAM
- Postcode district: LL12
- Postcode district: LL13
- Dialling code: 01978
- Police: North Wales
- Fire: North Wales
- Ambulance: Welsh
- UK Parliament: Wrexham
- Senedd Cymru – Welsh Parliament: Wrexham
- List of places UK Wales Wrexham 53.0607°N 2.9805°W Map of the community

Acton (sometimes Welsh: Gwaunyterfyn) is a suburb and community in Wrexham, Wrexham County Borough, Wales. It spans the north-eastern part of Wrexham. The area is largely residential and at its centre, lies Acton Park, the location of the former Acton Hall.

== History and geography ==
The name 'Acton' is derived from Old English, meaning "oak town", and is one of several placenames in the area with an Old English root. As with the neighbouring township of Stansty, the English name remained in use (often spelled in a cymricized form Actyn) under Welsh administration.

"Acton" is still used in Welsh, although the Welsh Language Commissioner has noted a name Gwaunyterfyn, meaning 'boundary meadow or moor'. It originally derives from an irregularly-shaped parcel of land historically referred to by the names "Acton Moor" and "Gwaun y terfyn" (then translated as 'layland of the boundary / the boundary moor') and which formed the boundary between the townships of Acton and Wrexham Regis. The three fields comprising Gwaun y terfyn, or Acton Moor, had by the late 18th lost their older name and had partly been enclosed by Acton Park.

Madog ap Gruffydd Maelor granted land in this area to the monks of Valle Crucis Abbey in 1202 and the charters of Valle Crucis for 1200 and 1222 mention abbey lands at 'Actun'. A 1289 survey of Wrexham townships includes 'Actone vachan' (Acton Fechan – 103 statute acres) and 'Acton vaur' (Acton Fawr – 953 statute acres). By the late 16th century, much of the township had become part of the 'Acton Park' estate of the Jeffreys family. The family based itself at Acton Hall, which was recorded as having 11 hearths in 1670, making it one of the largest houses in the Wrexham area.

Acton was originally one of the townships of the parish of Wrexham (in 1886, the township was transferred to the new ecclesiastical parish of Rhosddu). Under the civil administration, the civil parish of Acton, based on the old township's boundaries, was part of the Wrexham Rural District, but was abolished in 1935 and parts were transferred to the civil parishes of Bieston and Wrexham Regis. All the latter structures were abolished under the terms of the Local Government Act 1972.

In 1985, a Boundary Commission review led to the creation of four new community areas within Wrexham itself, Acton, Rhosddu, Offa, and Caia Park, each of which would have their own community council.

The community of Acton covers approximately 3.34 square kilometres (1.29 square miles) and comprises the electoral divisions (wards) of Acton (Acton Central & Acton Park), Borras Park, Little Acton, Maesydre and Rhosnesni. The southernmost tip of the community area is on the corner of Chester Street and Charles Street in the city centre, and is bounded by Chester Road to the west, Holt Road to the south-east and the Llanypwll link road (A5156) to the north-east. At the 2001 census, it was the most populous community in the county borough with 12,960 people in 5,412 households.

The area neighbours the communities of Rhosddu to the west, Caia Park to the south, Holt to the east and Gresford to the north.

== Acton Park ==
At the geographical centre of Acton lies Acton Park, the location of the former Acton Hall. The central feature of the park is the lake. It was originally constructed using puddled clay in the 18th century but during the 1970s, the pond was drained and butyl lined. Fishing is popular on the lake with platforms provided for anglers. (The lake is closed for fishing during the Wildfowl nesting period). A wetland area exists and supports a diverse range of wildlife.

A designated area managed to benefit wildlife as one of the Wrexham Bio-diversity Action Plan 'Urban Green Space' areas. Native wild meadow flowers have been planted within the existing grassed areas to assist in providing habitats for insects and other fauna, increasing the bio-diversity of the parkland.

In 2008, Wrexham County Borough Council secured Heritage Lottery Funding to allow them to prepare design proposals for the refurbishment of the park, the ideas that have been drawn up so far are in the early stages but they include a Discovery Centre, Lakeside Pavilion and extending the bowling greens.

A nearly 500-year-old sweet chestnut tree in the park was voted UK's Tree of the Year in 2023.

=== Estate history ===
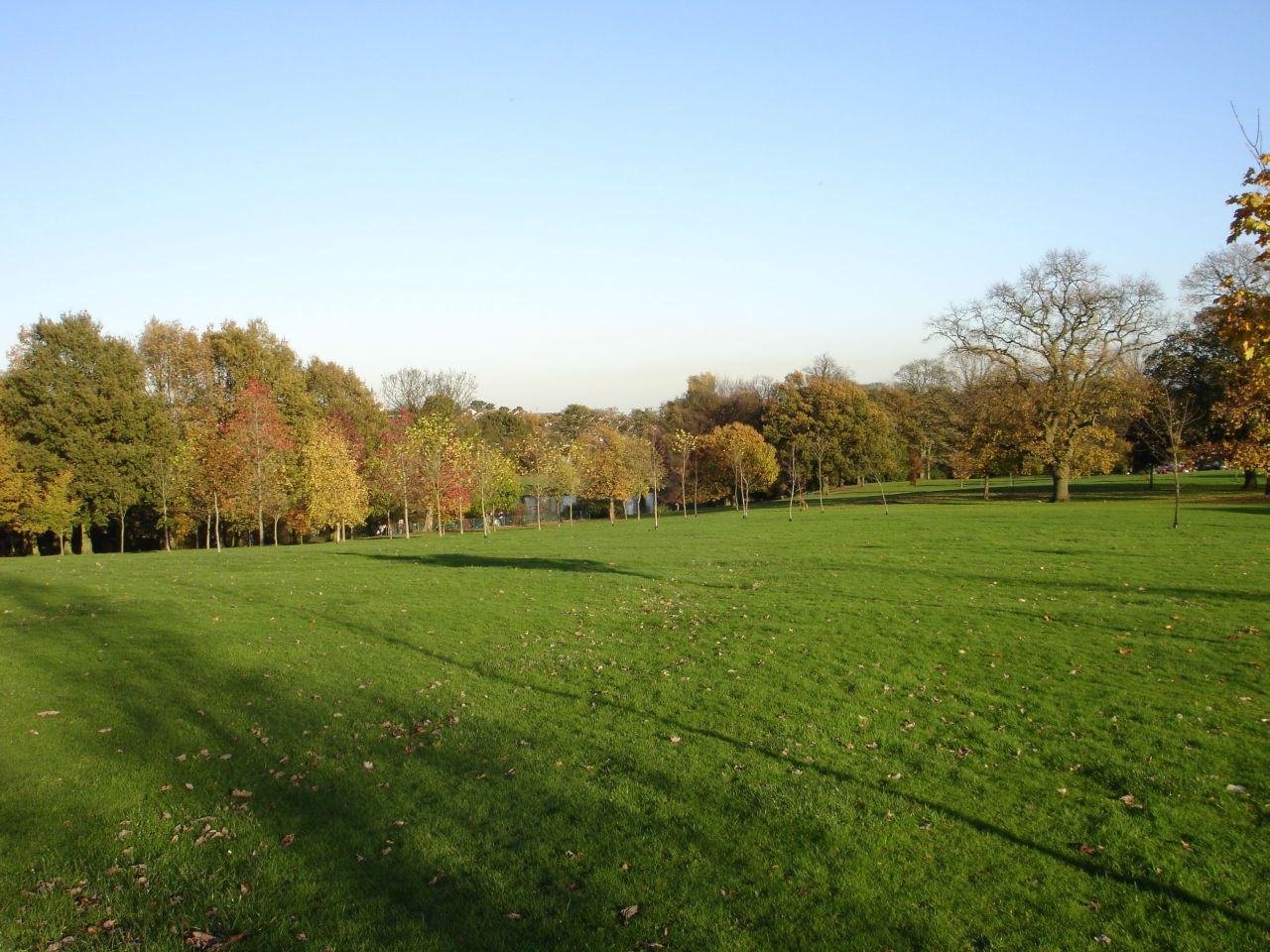
The historic Acton Park, November 2005.

The Acton estate has passed through several owners throughout the years. The prominent Jeffreys family (motto Pob dawn o Dduw, "Every Gift from God"), had their seat at Acton Hall in the 17th century, the family's prosperity having been founded by Anglesey circuit judge John Jeffreys (d. 1622). Jeffreys had built up the estate by expanding and consolidating the possessions of the descendants of the Trevor family in the Wrexham common fields.

The most famous member of the family was George Jeffreys, 1st Baron Jeffreys of Wem, (15 May 1645 – 18 April 1689), better known as Judge Jeffreys or "The Hanging Judge", who was born in Acton. He became notorious after the severe punishments he handed down at the trials of the supporters of the Duke of Monmouth during the reign of King James II.

In 1680 he became Chief Justice of Chester, and later Lord Chief Justice of England, despite Charles II reportedly damning Jeffreys' character:

"He has no learning, no sense, no manners and has more impudence than ten street walkers." In 1688 when James II fled the country, Jeffreys also tried to flee, but was arrested in Wapping and placed in the Tower of London "for his own safety", because the mob was outrageous against him. He died there the following year.

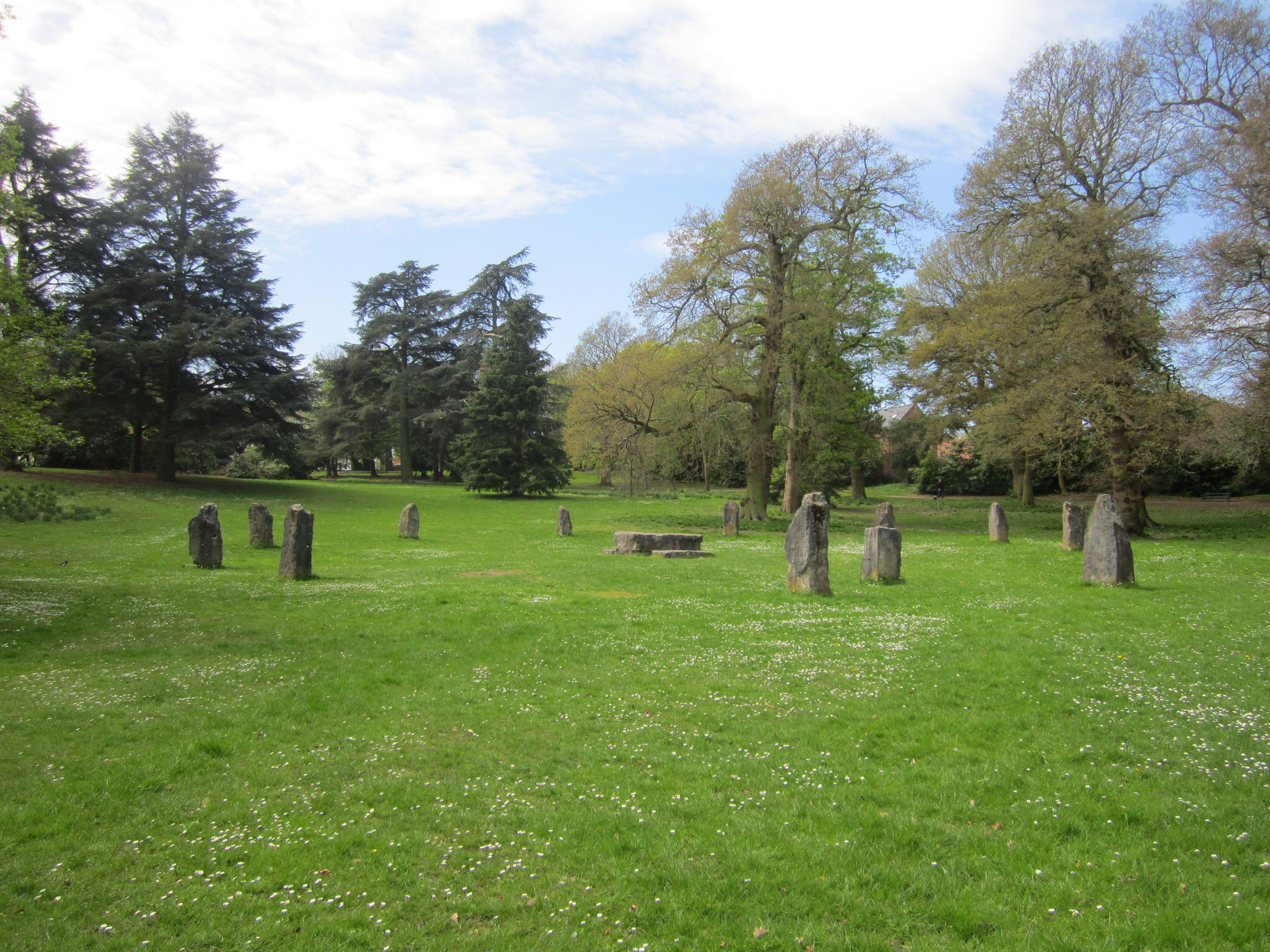
Acton Park Gorsedd Stones

Sir Griffith Jeffreys (Judge Jeffreys' nephew) rebuilt the family home between 1687 - 1695. His wife Dame Dorothy set up a charity in her will which helped found many of the first schools in Wrexham.

The estate was eventually sold by the Jeffreys family in 1747. After the Jeffreys the house belonged to Philip Egerton and then Ellis Yonge before being purchased by Sir Foster Cunliffe, 3rd Baronet, for £27,000.

The parkland was originally laid out in 1785 by Sir Foster Cunliffe, who also added a new wing to the hall, designed by James Wyatt. Many of the mature specimen trees which survive today were planted at this time and the general park layout and positioning of the lake were part of the original design.

Later generations did little to improve the property. Sir Robert Henry Cunliffe, 4th Baronet (1785–1859), stuccoed the walls of the house, while Sir Robert Alfred Cunliffe (1839–1905), faced it with stone in such a way that the house seemed to be of three different styles - none matching the other. After the death of Sir Foster Cunliffe, 6th Baronet (1875–1916) in World War I, the estate was bought in 1917 by Sir Bernard Oppenheimer. The Denbighshire Hussars were billeted in the house and grounds at that time. Oppenheimer opened a diamond cutting training school and workshop in the grounds of Acton Park. The scheme was designed to ensure jobs for ex-servicemen. It was the 'Homes Fit For Heroes' ethos in action, but Sir Bernard's death in 1921 led to the workshop closing.

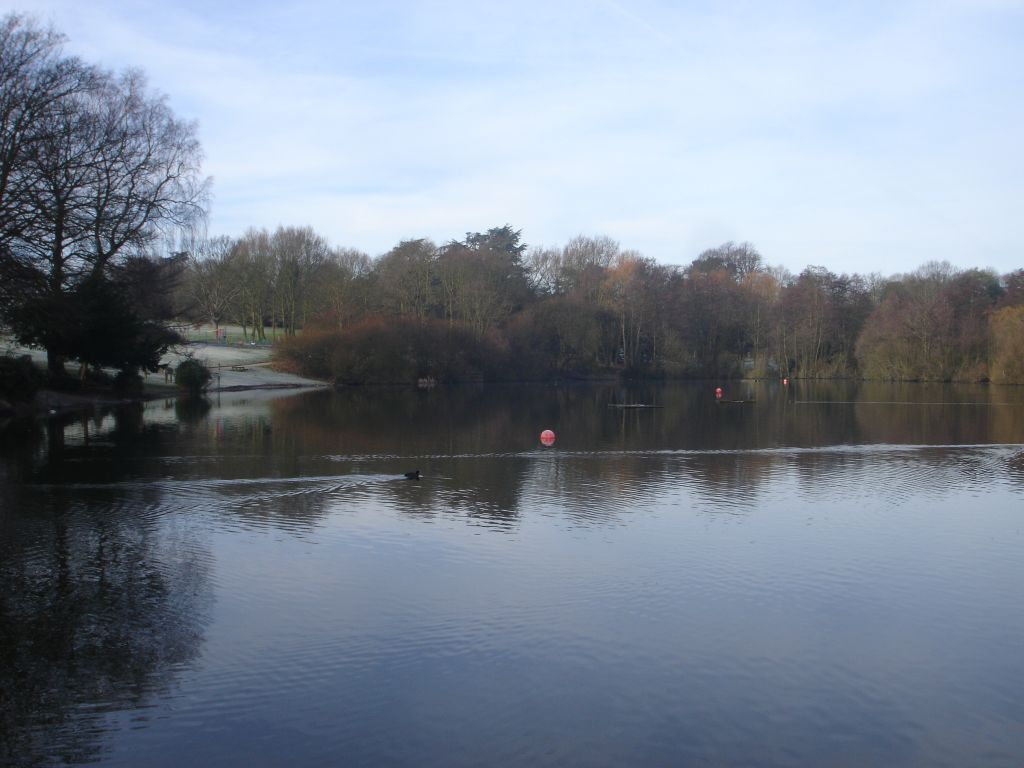
Acton Park Lake

Nine Acre Field and sixty acres by Rhosnesni Lane were bought by the Borough Council. Patrick Abercrombie was commissioned to design a quality housing scheme for the sixty acres. Building started in 1920, with a commemorative foundation stone being laid at Cilcen Grove by Mayor Thomas Sauvage J.P on 30 July 1920. Abercrombie's design survives to this day. The rest of the estate was turned into smallholdings for ex-soldiers. There were seven market garden and four dairy holdings.

Alderman William Aston purchased the house and grounds on the death of Sir Bernard. His initial plan to turn the hall into a technical school never took off. Instead the hall became a showroom and store for Aston's furniture company. The grounds were opened to the public.

In 1939 the War Office requisitioned Acton Park and Nissen huts were erected in the grounds for the soldiers while the officers were billeted in the house. The Lancashire Fusiliers, the Royal Welch Fusiliers, the South Wales Borderers and the Gurkhas were just a few of the regiments who stayed at Acton during the Second World War.

In 1943 the American 33rd Signals Construction Battalion and 400th Armoured Field Artillery Battalion were billeted at Acton Park. Wrexham was host to men from Kentucky, Ohio, West Virginia and Indiana. Eagles Meadow became their vehicle store, the Butter Market their canteen, Acton School Hall the venue for their dances and chewing gum was sold at the US Army store in Garden Village. The US Army was still segregated and the black soldiers were billeted at 'The Studio' by the junction of Chester Road and Grove Road.

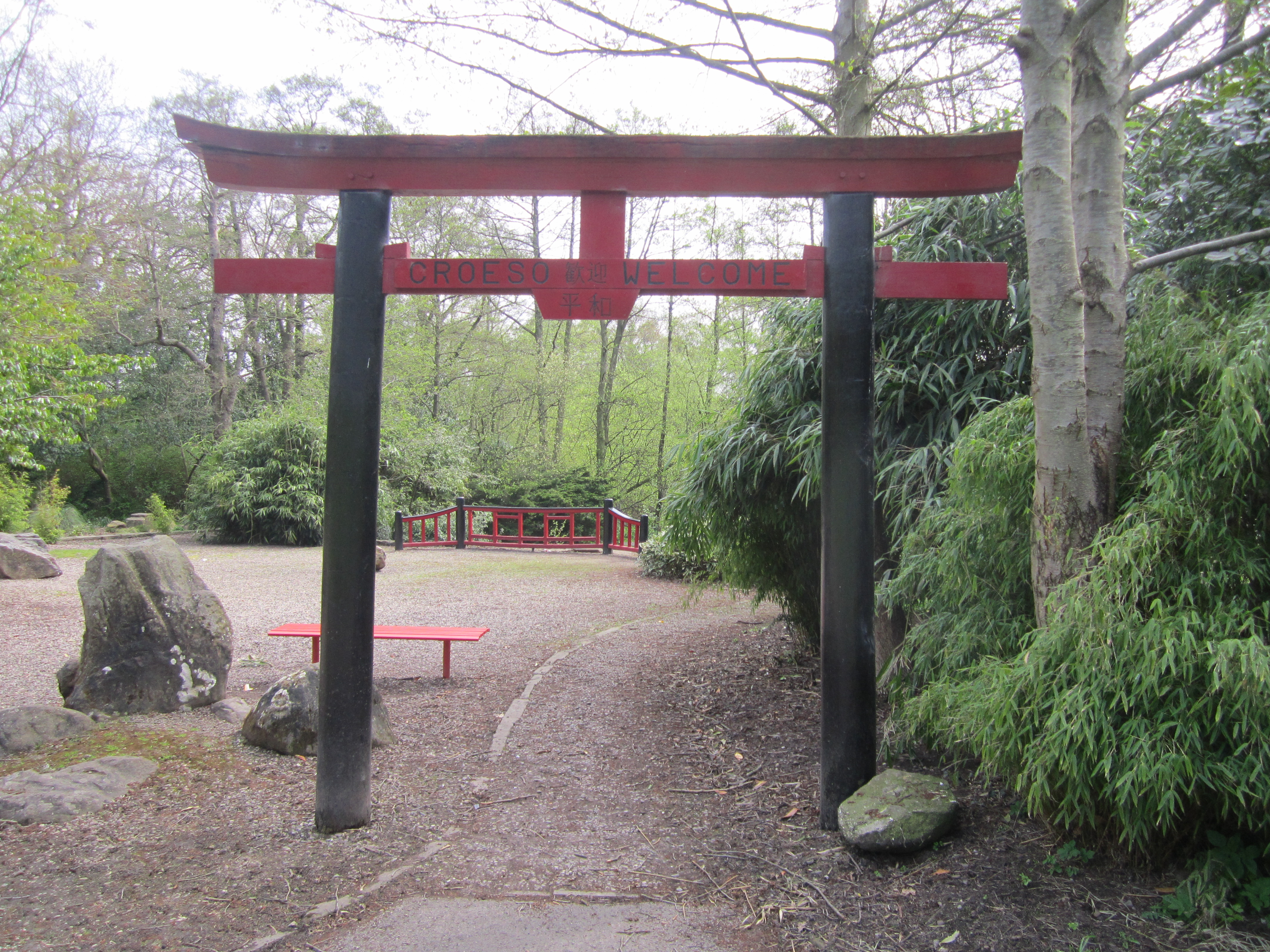
Acton Park Japanese Garden

The house just survived occupation by the US Army, but in a very poor state. The north wing was demolished just after the war. People plundered the park for firewood in the tough years of rationing in 1945-47.

In 1947 the Council was presented with the hall and parklands by, the then owner, Alderman William Aston. By then the grounds had become very overgrown and a programme of restoration was implemented. However, by 1954 the house was still in a dilapidated condition. Alderman Hampson campaigned for the house to be saved as the city's museum. He failed and the demolition team set to work in August 1954.

Nothing remains of the house today, only the gateway with its Four Dogs, the lodges and parts of the original stone boundary wall are left.

The grounds of Acton Hall were opened to the public as a pleasure garden shortly after the land was bought in the 1920s. The park now features a bowling green, tennis courts, children's play areas, a Japanese garden and a lake with abundant wildlife. There is also a Gorsedd, a circle of standing stones, to mark the site of the dedication ceremony for the 1977 National Eisteddfod, which was held on nearby Borras Airfield.

=== Welsh Cup Final ===
In 1878 the Racecourse was unavailable as a venue for the first Welsh Cup Final, so Sir Robert Cunliffe provided land measuring 110 metres (120 yards) x 69 metres (75 yards) within Acton Park as a playing field for the final.

=== Housing ===
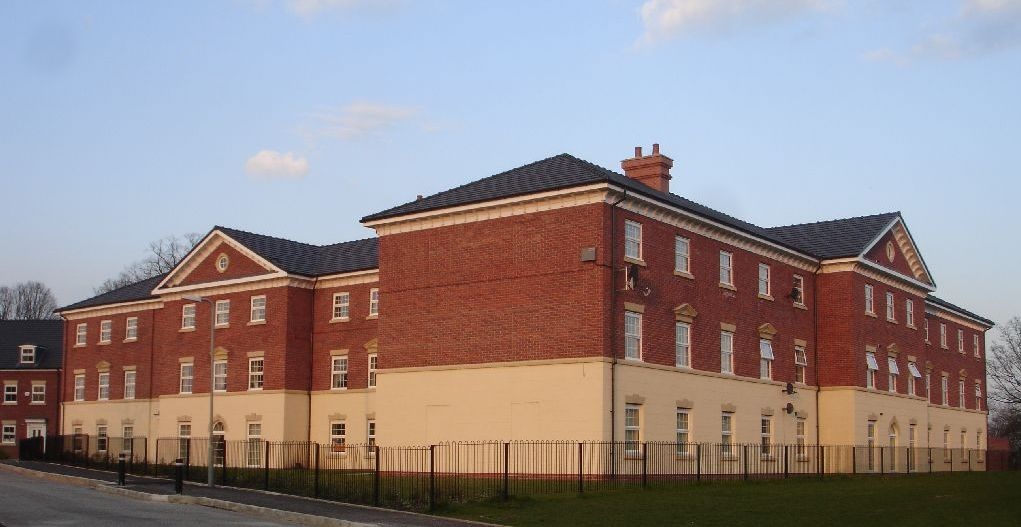
Acton Hall, rebuilt in modern materials in 2005

From 30 July 1920 until 1970, about half of the park was developed as an area for housing. The remaining 17 hectares (42 acres) of the original estate forms the majority of the present day park. The site of the original hall had been in use for several years as a waste disposal site for local residents, but in 2005 a residential development was built in the style of the original hall consisting mainly of flats with a small number of houses within the original boundaries of Acton Hall.

== Governance ==
The community is divided into five electoral wards – Acton, Borras, Little Acton, Maesydre and Rhosnesni – which each elect a councillor to Wrexham County Borough Council.

There is also an elected community council with 16 community councillors representing six community wards (the Acton county ward being subdivided into Acton Central and Acton Park).

== Public houses ==
- The Acton Park
- The Four Dogs
- The Cunliffe Arms
- The Gate Hangs High

== Schools ==
- Acton Park Primary School
- Alexandra Primary School
- Borras Park CP School
- Rhosnesni High School
- Barkers Lane Community Primary School

== Churches ==
- St Margaret's Church (not actually in Acton, but serves part of the Acton community)
- St John's Church
- Borras Park Evangelical Church
- The Church of Jesus Christ of Latter-day Saints (LDS Church)
