= Rhosrobin =

Village in Wrexham, Wales

Coordinates: 53.068°N 3.007°W

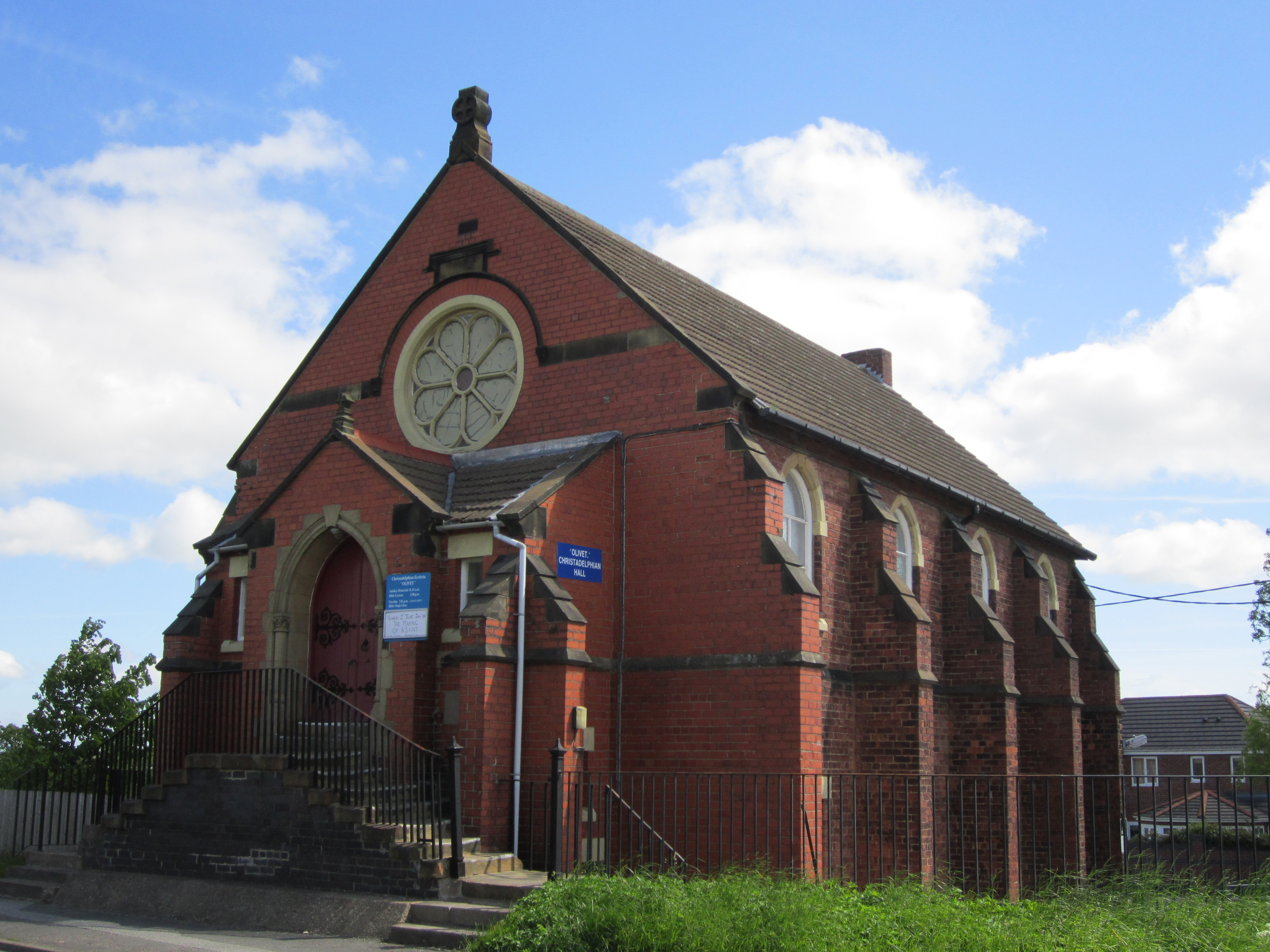
- Olivet Christadelphian Hall, Rhosrobin

- Location within Wrexham
- OS grid reference: SJ326528
- Community: Gwersyllt
- Principal area: Wrexham
- Country: Wales
- Sovereign state: United Kingdom
- Post town: WREXHAM
- Postcode district: LL11
- Dialling code: 01978
- Police: North Wales
- Fire: North Wales
- Ambulance: Welsh
- UK Parliament: Wrexham
- Senedd Cymru – Welsh Parliament: Wrexham

Rhosrobin is a village situated in Wrexham County Borough, Wales, about 2 miles (3.2 km) north west of Wrexham city centre, close to the A483 road.

The population of the village has expanded considerably in recent years and many of the older landmarks have been swept away to make room for new housing and commercial development, attracted by direct access along the B5425 to Wrexham city centre, and easy connection to the A483 (Trunk) at Pandy, for Chester and the North West of England beyond.

Taking the B5425 (Llay) from Wrexham, the village boundary is now marked with a brown sign alongside the new Top Farm Road housing development.

Following the Main Road over the Chester – Shrewsbury railway, the main commercial centre of the village can be seen. Although clearly located in Rhosrobin, the Rhosddu Industrial Estate takes its name from the old colliery that once occupied this whole area. The colliery was opened in the 1860s by The Wrexham Coal Company and at its peak employed almost 1000 men. The colliery closed in 1924. The only surviving building can be seen at the rear of the estate – the old wheelhouse is currently occupied by a pallets business.

The Churchlea development to the side of the Olivet Christadelphian Chapel was built on the site of the disused North Wales Mineral Railway Company railway track. The route of the old track can be seen opposite Churchlea making its way to the long since gone Wheatsheaf junction in Gwersyllt.

The short unadopted road running to the rear of the Chapel originally ran the full length of the land down to the main railway line, giving access to a cottage built beside the track and also to two long terraces of houses built on higher ground. Although the terraced properties were demolished in the 1970s, the land remained undeveloped until very recently. The cottage was demolished to make way for the Churchlea development.

The village was served briefly by its own railway station, Rhosrobin Halt, which was actually situated in Pandy, opposite what is now known as the Pandy Business Park. The Halt was opened in 1932 by the Great Western Railway Co. and closed in October 1947. Very little remains of the structure, which was used mainly by colliers who worked at the large Gresford Colliery nearby.

Continuing along the B5425, the former St Peter's Church building remains but is now a veterinary practice and the old Rhosrobin School, which had more recently seen service as a commercial laundry, has now been demolished to make way for a new housing development called St. Peter's Close. The old school bell moved with the laundry company to its new premises on Llay Industrial Estate.

A murder was committed in Rhosrobin on Monday, 10 November 1902 when William Hughes shot his wife Jane Hannah Hughes. William Hughes was a native of Denbigh and served for many years in the Cheshire Regiment in India under the British Raj. On his return to Britain he worked as a collier in the Wrexham area. He married Jane Hannah Williams, his first cousin, in 1892. They separated in 1901 and Hughes was subsequently sentenced to three months in Shrewsbury prison for "family desertion". He was released on 6 November 1902 and on the 10th of the month he called upon his wife who by then was housekeeper to a Mr Tom Maddocks, a collier who was widowed with three children. When she came to the door Hughes discharged both barrels of a shotgun into her body from close range.

Hughes was tried at Denbigh Assizes in January 1903 and despite pleas of insanity the jury took just ten minutes to find him guilty of murder. At 8 a.m. on Tuesday 17 February 1903 William Hughes, 42, was executed on the gallows at Ruthin Gaol. Hughes is believed to be the only man to have been hanged at the Gaol.
