= GHA Coaches =

Bus and coach operator in North East Wales and North West England

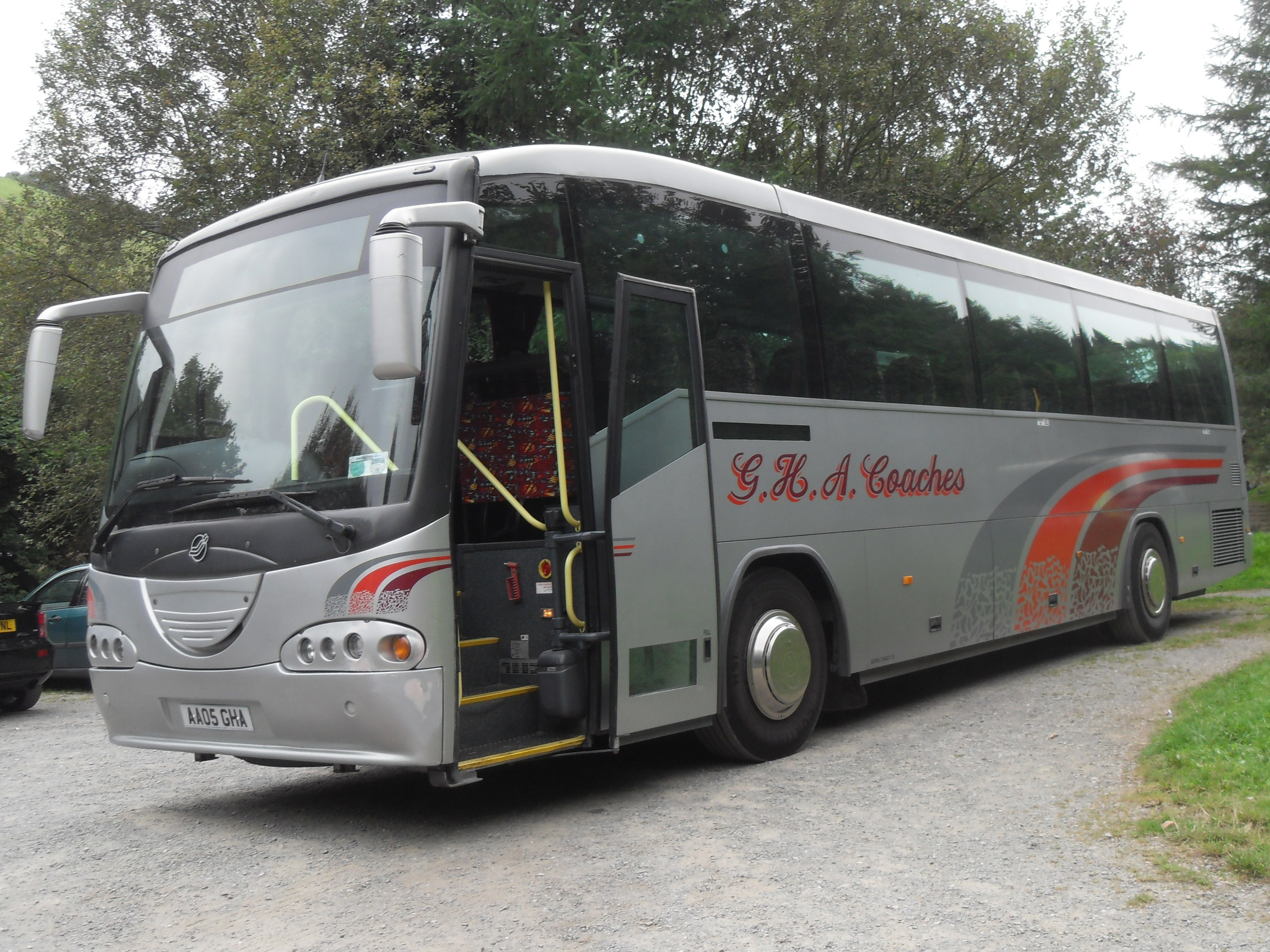
- Irizar Century bodied Scania K94IB in September 2009
- Founded: 1990; 35 years ago
- Ceased operation: 13 July 2016; 9 years ago
- Headquarters: Ruabon, Wrexham County Borough, Wales
- Service area: Wrexham County Borough; Flintshire; Denbighshire; Cheshire; Shropshire; Staffordshire; Gwynedd; Merseyside
- Service type: Bus & coach services
- Hubs: Corwen; Middlewich; Ruthin; Tarvin; Wrexham
- Fleet: 325 (June 2015)
- Website: www.ghacoaches.co.uk

Logo used from 2008 to 2015

GHA Coaches was a bus and coach operator serving North East Wales, Cheshire, and Shropshire. It also operated bus services extending into Telford & Wrekin, Staffordshire, Gwynedd, and Merseyside. The operator ceased trading after entering administration on 13 July 2016.

== History ==
=== Foundation ===
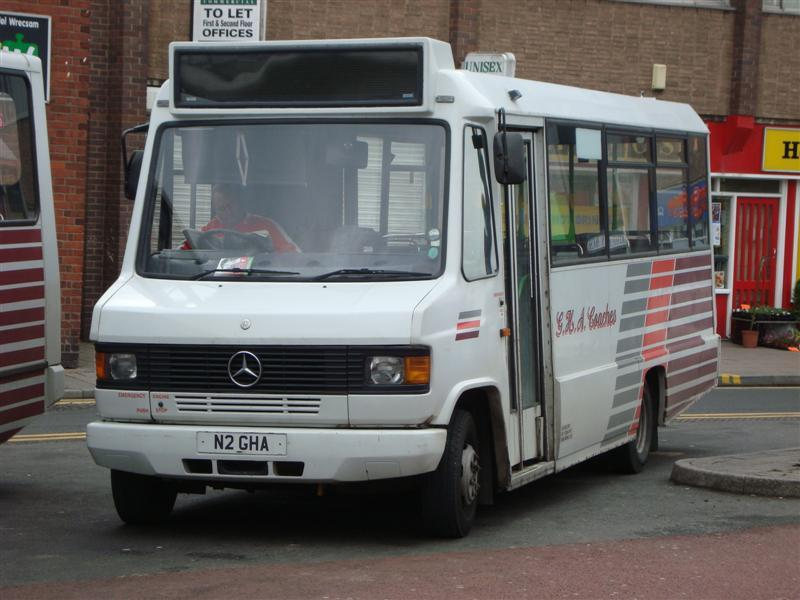
Marshall bodied Mercedes-Benz 709D in Wrexham in March 2009

GHA Coaches was founded by Eifion Lloyd Davies in 1990 and was originally based in Corwen before moving to Ruabon in the mid-1990s. It later expanded with the purchase of a number of other local companies, including:

- Hanmers Coaches, Southsea
- Chaloner's Buses, Moss
- Bryn Melyn, Llangollen
- Vale (of Llangollen) Travel, Cefn Mawr
- JO Travel, Ponciau
- Pat's Coaches, New Broughton (bus operations only)
- RS Travel, Middlewich
- Dobsons, Lostock Gralam
- Shropshire Bus & Coach, Shrewsbury

=== Bus wars ===
After GHA Coaches had taken over a small number of bus routes in the Northwich area, they launched an hourly 45 Northwich to Warrington service, which ran five minutes ahead of an existing hourly service operated by Network Warrington, followed by a 16 service between Warrington and Dallam that also ran just ahead of an existing Network Warrington service. Two new Optare MetroCity buses were acquired to operate the Warrington services.

The bus war led to constant timetable changes by both operators and eventually led to Network Warrington deciding to route all their Northwich to Warrington services via Barnton. At times, GHA Coaches drivers were known to block bus stands to prevent Network Warrington drivers picking up passengers, which on occasions led to angry exchanges between drivers. On one occasion in September 2014, a GHA Coaches driver committed a physical assault on a Network Warrington driver, for which he received a suspended jail term.

=== Administration ===
After GHA Coaches failed to pay almost £1 million in taxes, HM Revenue and Customs took out a court order against the operator, putting them in administration. The administrators found GHA Coaches had debts of £5.3 million, meaning there was no viable way to keep the business going. Operations were suspended on the evening of 13 July 2016, with the assets of the company put up for sale in order to recover as much of the debts as possible.

At the same time, a public inquiry was carried out into the safety of GHA Coaches vehicles, after 49 buses in the fleet of 161 were found to be unroadworthy.

Following the collapse of GHA Coaches, Gareth Lloyd Davies and Arwyn Lloyd Davies set up a new operation using an 'RJs of Wem' operating licence they had acquired following GHA Coaches' acquisition of Shropshire Bus and Coach, commencing operations on some former GHA Coaches routes in the Wrexham area. However, at the public inquiry the Traffic Commissioner banned the two Lloyd-Davies brothers from any involvement in any bus companies. This led to Sally Ann Lloyd Davies, Gareth's wife, taking over the new operation. However, at a separate public inquiry, the Traffic Commissioner revoked the licence belonging to RJs of Wem with effect from 19 December 2016.

== Operations ==
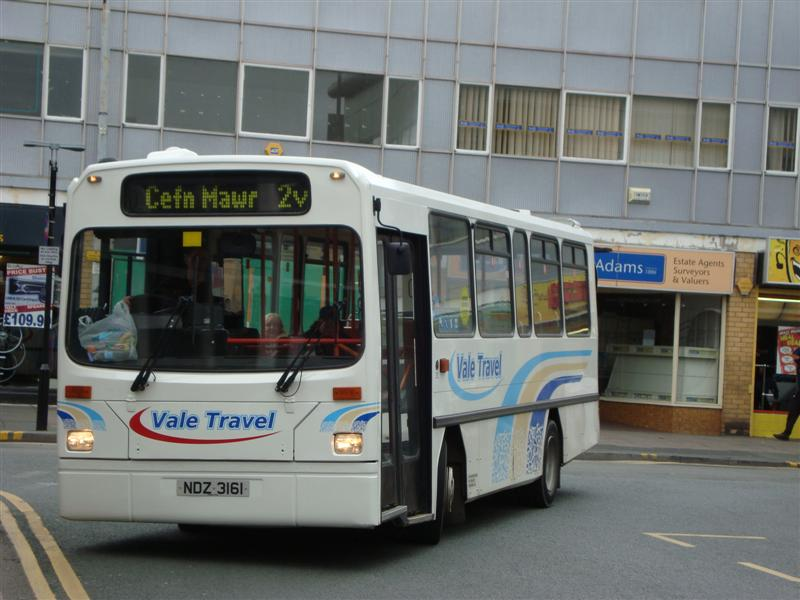
Vale Travel Wright Handybus bodied Dennis Dart in Wrexham in March 2009

Despite being founded in north east Wales, only about half of the bus services run by GHA Coaches at the time of closure were in this area. Services extended as far north as Manchester and Rhyl, to Hanley and Telford in the east, to Shrewsbury in the south and to Barmouth in the west.

=== GHA Gold ===
In October 2014, GHA Coaches launched a 'GHA Gold' brand on the 88 service from Knutsford to Altrincham via Wilmslow. They acquired four new Alexander Dennis Enviro200 buses which have free WiFi, leather seats, wood effect flooring, a passenger information system and one table on each bus. These vehicles carried branding for the route. They were funded by Waters Corporation as part of a public transport commitment in order for them to get planning permission for building a new large employment site just outside Morley Green.

GHA Coaches went on to launch a second Gold route between Congleton and Crewe the following year.

=== Coaches ===
Many coaches were inherited with the purchase of Hanmers Coaches, though as with the bus operations, the coach fleet expanded rapidly. Most coaches carried a livery of silver with red and burgundy stripes and the GHA Coaches name; some were in a similar livery with a white base and the Vale Travel name; some carried a plain yellow livery for school work.

The most common use for the coach fleet was school transport, and GHA had a number of high-capacity coaches dedicated to this work. Coaches were also used for private hire and occasional day trip and holiday work.

== Fleet and depots ==
As of June 2015, the GHA Coaches fleet consisted of 325 buses and coaches.

GHA Coaches' headquarters were at Ruabon in Wrexham County Borough. Other depots were at Tarvin, Ruthin, Shrewsbury and Winsford. Vehicles also operated an outstation at Betws Gwerfil Goch, which was the original base of the company.
