= John Marek (disambiguation) =

John Marek (born 1940) is a British politician.

John Marek may also refer to:

- John Marek (murderer) (1961–2009), American murderer
- John Marek Independent Party, political party
