= Stansty =

Area of Wrexham, Wales

Coordinates: 53.059°N 3.004°W

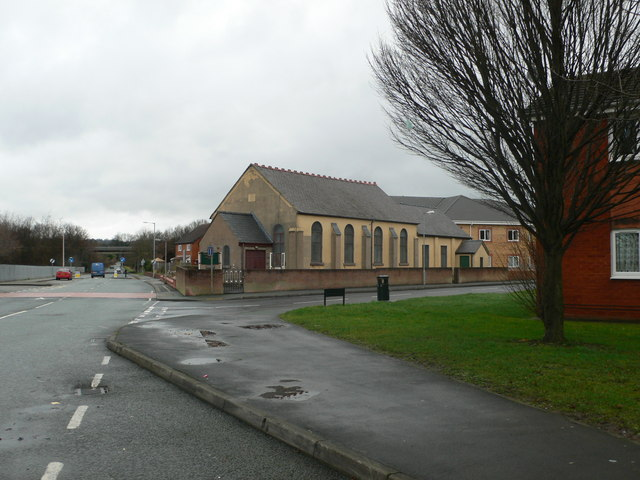
- Rhosddu Methodist Church, Stansty

- Location within Wrexham
- Population: 2,114 (2011)
- OS grid reference: SJ327518
- Community: Rhosddu
- Principal area: Wrexham
- Country: Wales
- Sovereign state: United Kingdom
- Post town: WREXHAM
- Postcode district: LL11
- Dialling code: 01978
- Police: North Wales
- Fire: North Wales
- Ambulance: Welsh
- UK Parliament: Wrexham
- Senedd Cymru – Welsh Parliament: Wrexham

Location of the Stansty electoral ward in Wrexham County Borough, Wales

Stansty (Welsh pronunciation) is an area and electoral ward in Wrexham County Borough, Wales, lying to the immediate north-west of the city of Wrexham. It is a former civil parish and township. Stansty is also an electoral ward to Wrexham County Borough Council. The ward population as taken at the 2011 Census was 2,114.

== Geography, name ==
Stansty consists of Higher Stansty and Lower Stansty; Higher Stansty lies near to Summerhill and Moss Valley within the community of Gwersyllt and is north of the A483 road. Lower Stansty, or Plas Coch as it is now more commonly referred to, is partly within the neighbouring community of Rhosddu, south of the A483. The division between Higher and Lower Stansty is an ancient one, as Stansty Issa (i.e. Lower Stansty), also called Stansty Abbatis, was originally a part of the manor of Wrexham Abbott belonging to Valle Crucis Abbey.

Along with those of some other places in this area of north-east Wales, the name of Stansty may have an Old English rather than Welsh root, perhaps from stan ("stone") with another element, possibly -stig or -stigu ("path, or "sty").

== History ==
Stansty was one of the original townships of the Lordship of Bromfield and Yale, and was also a township of the ecclesiastical parish of Wrexham. It comprised two townships, Stansty Ucha (Upper Stansty) and Stansty Issa (Lower Stansty) which were merged into one at the time of the Commonwealth. Stansty Issa was given to the Abbot of Valle Crucis Abbey by Gruffydd ap Madoc, Prince of Powys, in 1254.

Part of the township was transferred to the new parish of Gwersyllt in 1851, and other parts were transferred to the parishes of Southsea and Bersham in 1921 and 1934 respectively.

The civil parish of Stansty was split in 1935 between Gwersyllt and Wrexham Regis.

=== Stansty Park ===
Much of the area was farmland until the 20th century and belonged to an estate called Stansty Park, originally a manor in Stansty Uchaf (Higher Stansty) purchased by David ap Meilir in 1317. One of his descendants, John ap David ap Edward (1573-1635) took the surname of Edwards; the family seat, Plas Issa, was built in 1577. His children included John Edwards (b.1612), court physician to Charles I, and Jonathan Edwards (b.1615), Archdeacon of Derry, while his daughter Margaret married John Jones Maesygarnedd the regicide. John Edwards (1619–73) expanded the Stansty estate, later known as Stansty Park, until it took up most of Stansty township: however his great-great-grandson, Peter Edwards, died without issue in 1783, and the estate, passing to distant relatives, was eventually sold to the ironmaster Richard Thompson.

Thompson built a new house, Stansty Hall, on the site in the 1830s. The late-Georgian hall at Stansty was later threatened by subsidence from coal mining and was largely demolished in the 1920s - a small section being incorporated into a more modern building - while some of the former estate's farmland has since been developed for modern housing. However, the park's highly elaborate wrought-iron gates, attributed to the Davies brothers of Wrexham, had been rescued and moved to Erddig Hall in 1908.

Though much the estate of Stansty Park has now gone, its name is still used for a modern housing estate near Summerhill and for the ground of Cymru Alliance league football team Lex XI F.C. The name is also applied to the original 1577 house, Plas Issa, which still stands.

=== Plas Coch ===
Another of the area's main houses was Plas Coch in Lower Stansty, which was built in the late 16th century in mature hand-made red brick, giving the house its name (Plas Coch translates roughly as "Red Hall"). It was a two-storey building: the plan of the dwelling was a typical through passage house with access at either end of the passage. The house was built for Sir William Meredith, one of the sons of Richard Meredith of Allington or Trevalyn (near Rossett) and treasurer and paymaster of the army in the reigns of Elizabeth I and James I. Edward Meredith, a brother to William, was recorded in 1610 as trading as draper in Cheapside, London and he had held the lease on Plas Coch from his nephew for a time. Edward Meredith held the office of the High Sheriff of Denbighshire in 1629.

In 1709 the Plas Coch estate was sold by Sir William Meredith of Kent to Sir John Wynn, 1st Baronet of Gwydir Castle, Llanrwst.

Plas Coch played an important part in the social life of the city, hosting the Denbighshire & Flintshire Agricultural Society Show and the Annual Wrexham Lager Festival. The house and outbuildings were demolished in the late 1980s to make way for a large supermarket and retail development. The only part of the original property remaining today is a short length of stone wall at the roadside in front of a branch of The Range. During the construction of the retail development in 1991, a hoard of Roman coins was discovered by workmen: however all of the coins subsequently disappeared. In 1995 further construction work on the site revealed traces of Roman field boundaries, hearths and a corn drying kiln.

== Coal mining era ==
The area, like much of Wrexham, has a tradition of coal mining. Rhosddu Colliery, or the Wrexham & Acton Colliery as it was also known, was once reached along Colliery Road (the building of the A483 road has since divided the old colliery site). Colliery Road is still in existence today, but is now surrounded by a residential area.

== Public houses in Stansty ==
- The Railway Inn on Railway Road
- The Plas Coch on Plas Coch Road

== Schools in Stansty ==
- Ysgol Plas Coch
