= Brynteg =

Brynteg (Welsh pronunciation) may refer to:

- Brynteg, Anglesey, north-west Wales
- Brynteg, Wrexham, north-east Wales
- Ysgol Brynteg, a high school in Bridgend, south-east Wales
