= Gatewen Halt railway station =

Disused railway station in Wales

Gatewen Halt

General information
- Location: New Broughton, Wrexham County Borough; Wales
- Coordinates: 53.0549°N 3.0242°W
- Grid reference: SJ314513
- Platforms: 1

Other information
- Status: Disused

History
- Original company: Great Western Railway
- Pre-grouping: Great Western Railway
- Post-grouping: Great Western Railway

Key dates
- 1 May 1905: Opened
- 1 January 1931: Closed
Location

Gatewen Halt railway station was a station in New Broughton, Wrexham, Wales. The station was opened on 1 May 1905 and closed on 1 January 1931.

Preceding station	Disused railways	Following station
Pentre Broughton Halt; Line and station closed	Great Western Railway; Moss Valley Branch	Wrexham General; Line and station open
