= Gwersyllt Hill Halt railway station =

Former railway station in Wrexham, Wales

Gwersyllt Hill Halt

General information
- Location: Pentre Broughton, Wrexham County Borough; Wales
- Coordinates: 53.0696°N 3.0325°W
- Grid reference: SJ309530
- Platforms: 1

Other information
- Status: Disused

History
- Original company: Great Western Railway
- Pre-grouping: Great Western Railway
- Post-grouping: Great Western Railway

Key dates
- 1 May 1906: Opened
- 1 January 1931: Closed
Location

Gwersyllt Hill Halt railway station was a station in Pentre Broughton, Wrexham, Wales. The station was opened on 1 May 1906 and closed on 1 January 1931.

Preceding station	Disused railways	Following station
Moss Halt; Line and station closed	Great Western Railway; Moss Valley Branch	Pentre Broughton Halt; Line and station closed
