= Hung parliament =

Parliament without an absolute majority

A hung parliament is a term used mainly in the United Kingdom, Canada, New Zealand, and Australia to describe a situation in which no single political party or pre-existing coalition has an absolute majority of legislators (commonly known as members or representatives) in a parliament or other legislature. The term is most often applied to legislatures operating under the Westminster system and typically employing majoritarian electoral systems.

This situation is also known as a balanced parliament, or—for local government in the United Kingdom—a parliament under no overall control (NOC). A hung parliament may result in a coalition government, a minority government, or a snap election if a government cannot be formed.

In multi-party systems, particularly where proportional representation is employed, it is rare for a single party to hold a majority of the seats, and likewise rare for one party to form government on its own (i.e. coalition government is the norm). Consequently, the term is generally either unused in these systems, as a legislature without a single-party majority is the norm and thus every parliament is "hung", or reinterpreted to refer to the case of no coalition bloc holding a majority of the seats (however, this reinterpretation itself requires the existence of stable coalition blocs in the first place).

In the Westminster system, in the absence of a clear majority, no party or coalition has an automatic constitutional entitlement to form government. This can result in the formation of a coalition government of parties which can together command a majority, or the formation of a minority government, where the ruling party receives confidence and supply from smaller parties or independent legislators. If none of these solutions prove workable, the head of state may dissolve parliament (typically on the advice of the head of government), triggering a snap election.

In Canada, the term is generally not used, as it is typical for the party that wins a plurality (but not a majority) of seats to form a minority government on its own. These situations are typically called a "minority government" or "minority parliament" by the Canadian media. The ruling party then seeks to work with other parties on a case-by-case basis.

== Overview ==
A normal objective of parliamentary systems – especially those requiring responsible government such as the Westminster system – is the formation of a stable government (i.e. ideally one that lasts a full parliamentary term, until the next election would normally be due). This requires a government to be able to muster sufficient votes in parliament to pass motions of confidence and supply, especially motions of no-confidence and budget bills. If such motions fail, they normally result in the dissolution of parliament and a fresh election. In some parliamentary systems, however, a new government may be formed without recourse to an election – if, for example, a minor party holds the balance of power, it may publicly express for the opposition, thereby creating a new majority.

The term "hung parliament" is most often used of parliaments dominated by two major parties or coalitions. General elections in such systems usually result in one party having an absolute majority and thus quickly forming a new government. In most parliamentary systems, a hung parliament is considered exceptional and is often seen as undesirable. In other contexts, a hung parliament may be seen as ideal – for example, if opinions among the voting public are polarised regarding one or more issues, a hung parliament may lead to the emergence of a compromise or consensus.

If a legislature is bicameral, the term "hung parliament" is usually used only with respect to the lower house.

In a multi-party system with legislators elected by proportional representation or a similar systems, it is usually exceptionally rare and difficult for any party to have an absolute majority. Thus, under such situations, every parliament is "hung" and coalition governments are normal. However, the term may be used to describe an election in which no established coalition wins an outright majority (such as the German federal election of 2005 or the 2018 Italian general election).

== History ==
The term apparently emerged in the United Kingdom, around the time of the 1974 election, by analogy with a hung jury, that is, one unable to reach a verdict. However, whereas a hung jury results in a mistrial, requiring a new trial, there is no general rule under which the absence of a clear majority requires a fresh election. In recent years, most "hung parliaments" have served their full term.

=== Australia ===
The House of Representatives elected in 2010, with a 72–72 tie between the Labor Party and the Opposition Coalition.

Australian parliaments are modelled on the Westminster system, with a hung parliament typically defined as a lack of a lower house parliamentary majority from either the Australian Labor Party or Liberal/National Coalition.

Hung parliaments are rare at the federal level in Australia, as a de facto two-party system, in which the Australian Labor Party competes against a permanent Liberal-National Coalition of the conservative parties, has existed with only brief interruptions since the early 20th century. Prior to 1909, no party had had a majority in the House of Representatives. As a result, there were frequent changes of government, several of which took place during parliamentary terms.

Since 1909, when the two-party system was cemented, hung parliaments have occurred as a result of the 1919, 1922, 1934, 1940, and 2010 elections, although that terminology was not in use until the late 20th century. Each of those elections resulted in the formation of minority governments, although the 1922 and 1934 elections resulted in the formation of coalition governments within a few months of the election (in 1922, before the new parliament had opened). After the 1940 election, there was an inter-election change of government as a result of independents switching support, resulting in the defeat of the Fadden government and the formation of the Curtin government.

Declining support for the major parties in recent times is leading to more non-majoritarian outcomes at elections. At the 2010 federal election, which resulted in an exact 72–72 seat tie between Labor and the Liberal-National Coalition, incumbent Prime Minister Julia Gillard secured the support of four out of six Independent and Green Party crossbenchers and continued to govern until 2013. In the 2016 federal election the Liberal-National Coalition won 76 seats, the bare minimum required to form a majority government. The Liberal-National Coalition government lost its majority government status after a by-election in 2018, but regained its majority in 2019.

Hung parliaments are rather more common at a state level. The Tasmanian House of Assembly and the unicameral Australian Capital Territory Legislative Assembly are both elected by Hare-Clark proportional representation, thus, elections commonly return hung parliaments. In other states and territories, candidates contest single-member seats. With far fewer seats than federal parliament, hung parliaments are more likely to be elected. Recent examples include New South Wales in 1991 and 2023, Queensland in 1998 and 2015, Victoria in 1999, South Australia in 1997 and 2002, Western Australia in 2008, the Australian Capital Territory in 2008 and 2012 and Tasmania in 2010.

In the lead up to 2025 election, polling results by the Australia Institute showed that more than twice as many Australians support a power-sharing arrangement in the next term of parliament as oppose one (41.7% vs 19.7%). An analysis of 25 power-sharing parliaments in Australia shows crossbenchers negotiate a wide range of concessions for confidence and supply. Negotiations include parliamentary and policy reforms, extra staff and resources, and presiding officer positions for crossbenchers. At the 2025 Australian federal election, the incumbent Labor government was returned in 94 of 150 seat landslide victory.

=== Canada ===
In Canada, the term is generally not used, as it is typical for the party that wins a plurality (but not a majority) of seats to form a minority government on its own. These situations are typically called a "minority government" or "minority parliament" by the media. The ruling party then seeks to work with other parties on a case-by-case basis. The average lifespan of a minority government in Canada is two years.

The 45th Canadian Parliament elected in the 2025 Canadian federal election resulted in Canada's most recent (and formerly) minority parliament.

Minority parliaments at either the federal and provincial level are an infrequent but not unusual occurrence in Canada. Six of the previous eight recent federal elections have resulted in hung parliaments (the 38th, the 39th, the 40th, the 43rd, the 44th, and the 45th). Following all six elections the largest party ruled as a "minority government". Although Canadian minority governments have tended to be short-lived, the two successive minorities under Prime Minister Stephen Harper managed to hold on to power from February 2006 until a no confidence vote in March 2011. The subsequent election saw a majority parliament elected with Harper's Conservative Party obtaining a 24-seat majority.

While most Canadian minority governments end in dissolution via non-confidence or a snap election call, there have been a few attempts to transition to a new government without returning to the ballot box. Most notably, the 2008 Canadian Federal Election resulted in the 2008–09 Canadian parliamentary dispute. While the Conservative Party had a plurality of seats, the Liberal Party and New Democratic Party (NDP), supported by The Bloc Québécois, agreed to defeat the Conservatives in favour of a Liberal/NDP coalition government. On 4 December 2008, Governor General Michaëlle Jean granted Prime Minister Stephen Harper's request for a prorogation of Parliament on the condition that parliament reconvene early in the new year. The first session of the 40th parliament thus ended, delaying and ultimately avoiding a vote of non-confidence.

At the territorial level, a unique situation happened in the 2021 Yukon general election, in which the electoral district of Vuntut Gwitchin resulted in a tie. A judicial recount was held and the tie remained. A draw was held between the two candidates which ultimately named NDP challenger Annie Blake the winner against incumbent Liberal cabinet minister and MLA Pauline Frost. This victory ultimately resulted in a hung parliament in the Yukon legislature with the NDP holding the balance of power.

Parliament	Elections	Period		Single party with majority
Parliament	Elections	Start	End	Single party with majority
1st Canadian Parliament	1867 Canadian federal election	24 September 1867	8 July 1872	Conservative
2nd Canadian Parliament	1872 Canadian federal election	5 March 1873	2 January 1874	Conservative (Note: It was first controlled by a Conservative majority. After a scandal in the Conservative Party, the Liberals took power.)
3rd Canadian Parliament	1874 Canadian federal election	21 February 1874	16 August 1878	Liberal
4th Canadian Parliament	1878 Canadian federal election	13 February 1879	18 May 1882	Conservative
5th Canadian Parliament	1882 Canadian federal election	8 February 1883	15 January 1887	Conservative
6th Canadian Parliament	1887 Canadian federal election	7 April 1887	3 February 1891	Conservative
7th Canadian Parliament	1891 Canadian federal election	25 April 1891	24 April 1896	Conservative
8th Canadian Parliament	1896 Canadian federal election	19 August 1896	18 July 1900	Liberal
9th Canadian Parliament	1900 Canadian federal election	6 February 1901	29 September 1904	Liberal
10th Canadian Parliament	1904 Canadian federal election	11 January 1905	17 September 1908	Liberal
11th Canadian Parliament	1908 Canadian federal election	20 January 1909	29 July 1911	Liberal
12th Canadian Parliament	1911 Canadian federal election	15 November 1911	20 September 1917	Conservative
13th Canadian Parliament	1917 Canadian federal election	18 March 1918	4 October 1921	Government (Unionist)
13th Canadian Parliament	1917 Canadian federal election	18 March 1918	4 October 1921	Conservative
14th Canadian Parliament	1921 Canadian federal election	8 March 1922	27 June 1925	None (Note: While the Liberals won a one seat majority in the 1921 Canadian federal election resignations changed the parliament from a small majority to a Hung Parliament.)
15th Canadian Parliament	1925 Canadian federal election	7 January 1926	2 July 1926	None
16th Canadian Parliament	1926 Canadian federal election	9 December 1926	30 May 1930	None
17th Canadian Parliament	1930 Canadian federal election	8 September 1930	5 July 1935	Conservative
18th Canadian Parliament	1935 Canadian federal election	6 February 1935	25 January 1940	Liberal
19th Canadian Parliament	1940 Canadian federal election	16 May 1940	16 April 1945	Liberal
20th Canadian Parliament	1945 Canadian federal election	6 September 1945	30 April 1949	None (Note: Liberals gained majority due to resignations and by-elections.)
20th Canadian Parliament	1945 Canadian federal election	6 September 1945	30 April 1949	Liberal
21st Canadian Parliament	1949 Canadian federal election	15 September 1949	14 May 1953	Liberal
22nd Canadian Parliament	1953 Canadian federal election	12 November 1953	12 April 1957	Liberal
23rd Canadian Parliament	1957 Canadian federal election	14 October 1957	1 February 1958	None
24th Canadian Parliament	1958 Canadian federal election	12 April 1958	19 April 1962	Progressive Conservative
25th Canadian Parliament	1962 Canadian federal election	27 September 1962	6 February 1963	None
26th Canadian Parliament	1963 Canadian federal election	16 May 1963	8 September 1965	None
27th Canadian Parliament	1965 Canadian federal election	18 January 1965	23 April 1968	None
28th Canadian Parliament	1968 Canadian federal election	12 September 1968	1 September 1972	Liberal
29th Canadian Parliament	1972 Canadian federal election	4 January 1973	9 May 1974	None
30th Canadian Parliament	1974 Canadian federal election	30 September 1974	26 March 1979	Liberal
31st Canadian Parliament	1979 Canadian federal election	9 October 1979	14 December 1979	None
32nd Canadian Parliament	1980 Canadian federal election	14 April 1980	9 July 1984	Liberal
33rd Canadian Parliament	1984 Canadian federal election	5 November 1984	1 October 1988	Progressive Conservative
34th Canadian Parliament	1988 Canadian federal election	12 December 1984	8 September 1993	Progressive Conservative
35th Canadian Parliament	1993 Canadian federal election	17 January 1994	27 April 1997	Liberal
36th Canadian Parliament	1997 Canadian federal election	22 September 1997	22 October 2000	Liberal
37th Canadian Parliament	2000 Canadian federal election	29 January 2001	23 August 2004	Liberal
38th Canadian Parliament	2004 Canadian federal election	4 October 2004	29 November 2005	None
39th Canadian Parliament	2006 Canadian federal election	3 April 2006	7 September 2008	None
40th Canadian Parliament	2008 Canadian federal election	18 November 2008	26 March 2011	None
41st Canadian Parliament	2011 Canadian federal election	2 June 2011	2 August 2015	Conservative
42nd Canadian Parliament	2015 Canadian federal election	3 December 2015	11 September 2019	Liberal
43rd Canadian Parliament	2019 Canadian federal election	5 December 2019	15 August 2021	None
44th Canadian Parliament	2021 Canadian federal election	22 November 2021	23 March 2025	None
45th Canadian Parliament	2025 Canadian federal election	26 May 2025	TBD	None (Note: Liberals gained majority due to floor crossings.)
45th Canadian Parliament	2025 Canadian federal election	26 May 2025	TBD	Liberal

=== Fiji ===
The 8th Republican Parliament of Fiji, elected in 2022, is the incumbent parliament and the country's most recent hung parliament.

The 2022 Fijian general election resulted in a hung parliament, with no party gaining a majority of seats. Although the FijiFirst party, led by then-Prime Minister Frank Bainimarama, won the most seats, the three other parties that won seats (the People's Alliance, the National Federation Party and the Social Democratic Liberal Party) formed a coalition and Sitiveni Rabuka, leader of the People's Alliance, became the subsequent Prime Minister, ending 16 years of Bainimarama's rule.

=== France ===
Since the establishment of the two-round system for parliamentary elections in 1958, hung parliaments are unusual under the Fifth Republic. Still, 2 general elections out of 16 resulted in such a parliamentary configuration since 1958:

- June 1988 parliamentary elections: after being reelected as President of France in May 1988, François Mitterrand dissolved the National Assembly and called for a snap legislative election on 5 and 12 June 1988 to regain the majority he lost to a centre-right to right-wing coalition in 1986. The snap election resulted in France's first hung parliament since the fall of the Fourth Republic in 1958, with Mitterrand's PS as the largest party (275 seats) but 14 short of an overall majority. The Communists and the independent Centrists ended up as potential kingmakers in the newly elected Assembly.

9th National Assembly of France, elected in 1988, was France's first hung parliament since 1958.

- June 2022 parliamentary elections: less than two months after being reelected as president, Emmanuel Macron and his government, now led by Prime Minister Élisabeth Borne, fought the 2022 legislative election taking place on the 12 and 19 June. In the second round, Macron's centrist coalition unexpectedly lost its majority in the National Assembly and was reduced to being the largest bloc (with 251 seats) in a hung parliament. Going into the election with a 115-seat majority, Macron's government now fell 38 short of an absolute majority in the lower house of Parliament, the widest margin for any French cabinet since 1958. While both the left-wing NUPES and the far-right RN achieved significant gains, the centre-right to right-wing Republicans were left holding the balance of power in this hung parliament, despite suffering seizable losses.

16th National Assembly of France, elected in 2022, is France's second hung parliament since 1958.

- June–July 2024 parliamentary elections: on the evening of the 2024 European parliament election, with the preliminary results showing that the National Rally had significantly outperformed his coalition, Emmanuel Macron dissolved parliament and called an election on 30 June and 7 July 2024. The snap election resulted in the left-wing NUPES alliance, Macron's centrist coalition, and the National Rally each receiving similar numbers of seats, with NUPES in the lead and the centre-right-to-right-wing Republicans no longer holding enough seats to hold the balance of power. This situation led to a prolonged political crisis that is still ongoing, with several prime ministers being appointed and forced to resign in rapid succession: the Republican Michel Barnier (who led the government from 5 September until 4 December 2024); the Democrat François Bayrou (who led the government from 13 December 2024 until 9 September 2025); and Renaissance politician Sébastien Lecornu (who led the government from 9 September until his resignation on October 6, a period of just 26 days; Lecornu remains prime minister in a caretaker capacity).

The 17th National Assembly of France, the incumbent national assembly, is a hung parliament.

=== India ===
18th Lok Sabha, elected in 2024, was India's last hung parliament.

India is a federative multi-party parliamentary democracy with lower and upper houses at both national and sub-national levels.

However, despite having a multi-party system in place, it has witnessed a clear majority parliament for 45 years against its transition to democratic republic being 70 years old.

It has 8 recognized national parties with influence over major parts of India and regional parties with bases in certain states.

From 1989 to 2014, India had a continuous period of parliaments producing coalition governments, with clearer majorities for the Indian National Congress and Janata Party before this period and for the Bharatiya Janata Party after it. India returned to the norm of a hung parliament in the 2024 General Elections with both BJP and INC failing to produce majority in it. The confidence of Lok Sabha, lower house of Indian Parliament elected in general elections determines the prime minister and ruling party of India.

Lok Sabha	Elections	Period		Single party with majority
Lok Sabha	Elections	Start	End	Single party with majority
1st Lok Sabha	1951–52 Indian general election	17 April 1952	4 April 1957	Indian National Congress
2nd Lok Sabha	1957 Indian general election	5 April 1957	31 March 1962	Indian National Congress
3rd Lok Sabha	1962 Indian general election	2 April 1962	3 March 1967	Indian National Congress
4th Lok Sabha	1967 Indian general election	4 March 1967	27 December 1970	Indian National Congress (R)
5th Lok Sabha	1971 Indian general election	15 March 1971	18 January 1977	Indian National Congress (R)
6th Lok Sabha	1977 Indian general election	23 March 1977	22 August 1979	None
7th Lok Sabha	1980 Indian general election	18 January 1980	31 December 1984	Indian National Congress (I)
8th Lok Sabha	1984 Indian general election	31 December 1984	27 November 1989	Indian National Congress (I)
9th Lok Sabha	1989 Indian general election	2 December 1989	13 March 1991	None
10th Lok Sabha	1991 Indian general election	20 June 1991	10 May 1996	None
11th Lok Sabha	1996 Indian general election	15 May 1996	4 December 1997	None
12th Lok Sabha	1998 Indian general election	10 March 1998	26 April 1999	None
13th Lok Sabha	1999 Indian general election	10 October 1999	6 February 2004	None
14th Lok Sabha	2004 Indian general election	17 May 2004	18 May 2009	None
15th Lok Sabha	2009 Indian general election	22 May 2009	18 May 2014	None
16th Lok Sabha	2014 Indian general election	26 May 2014	24 May 2019	Bharatiya Janata Party
17th Lok Sabha	2019 Indian general election	17 June 2019	5 June 2024	Bharatiya Janata Party
18th Lok Sabha	2024 Indian general election	9 June 2024		None

Hung assemblies within states and alliances between national and regional parties at sub-national level are common.

=== Ireland ===
Because Ireland uses PR-STV, it is rare for any one party to have a majority on its own. The last such occasion was in 1977. However, one or other coalitions are known to be possible before and during the election. Therefore, a "hung Dáil" (Dáil Éireann being the lower and most dominant chamber of the Oireachtas/Parliament) in Ireland refers more to the inability of a coalition of parties who traditionally enter government together or would be expected to govern together, from doing so.

The President has no direct role in the formation of governments in the case of a hung parliament. However, he retains the power to convene a meeting of either or both the Dáil and Senate which could become important if there was a government trying to use parliamentary recess to prevent confidence votes and hold onto power. The President may also refuse to dissolve Dáil Eireann and call an election if the Taoiseach loses a vote of confidence, instead giving the other parties a chance to see if they can put together a government without proceeding to another election.

In 2016, Fine Gael and Labour, who had been in government the previous five years, were unable, due to Labour's collapse, to enter government again. Fianna Fáil had enough seats to put together a rainbow government with the other centre-left, hard left parties and independents but negotiations broke down. Fianna Fáil had also promised not to enter coalition with Sinn Féin.

The press began to speculate about a Germany style "Grand Coalition" similar to the Christian Democrats and Social Democrats there. Many members of FF considered FG too right wing to enter coalition with and threatened to leave the party this came to pass. As talks continued on without a new government (the old government, constitutionally, which had just been voted out, remaining in power including ministers who had lost their seats) FF agreed to allow a government to form by abstention. The parliamentary arithmetic fell in such a way that if FF TD's abstained on confidence and supply matters, a FG minority government could, with the support of a group of independents, form a new government. This was agreed in exchange for a number of policy concessions. Once the deal with FF was signed, Taoiseach Enda Kenny conducted talks with the independents and entered government for a second term.

=== Israel ===
All parliamentary elections in Israel have resulted in hung parliaments. The Knesset consists of 120 members and the highest number of seats a single faction has ever received was the 56 members Alignment (Ma'arach) got in the October 1969 elections. When the same faction was formed in January 1969 it consisted of 63 members, the only instance to date of a faction with an absolute majority in the Knesset. The lowest number of seats the largest faction has ever received in a Knesset election was 26 members received by One Israel in the 1999 Israeli general election.

=== Malaysia ===
The 2022 general election of Malaysia resulted in a hung parliament with no party or party coalition winning a simple majority for the first time in Malaysian history. Following five days of deliberation and negotiations within coalitions and parties, the Yang di-Pertuan Agong of Malaysia swore in Pakatan Harapan (PH) chairman Anwar Ibrahim, whose coalition won the most seats, as the tenth Prime Minister of Malaysia on 24 November 2022. To achieve a parliamentary majority, Pakatan Harapan formed a grand coalition government with Barisan Nasional (BN), Gabungan Parti Sarawak (GPS), Gabungan Rakyat Sabah (GRS) and various independent parties.

=== New Zealand ===
Hung parliaments were relatively uncommon in New Zealand prior to the introduction of proportional representation in 1993. On only four occasions since the beginnings of party politics in 1890 had a hung parliament occurred under the first-past-the-post system: in 1911, 1922, 1928 and 1931. The rarity between 1936 and 1996 was due to the regression into a two-party system, alternating between the long dominating Labour Party and National Party. From the first MMP election in 1996 until the 2020 election no single party gained an outright majority in parliament. The 2020 election was the first to return a majority (for the Labour Party) since 1993. Under the MMP system, the term "hung parliament" has been reappropriated to refer to the case of no bloc of parties being able to secure a majority of seats.

=== United Kingdom ===
The House of Commons following the 2017 general election. No party had a majority.

In the United Kingdom, before World War I, a largely stable two-party system existed for generations; traditionally, only the Tories and Whigs, or from the mid-19th century the Conservative and Liberal parties, managed to deliver Members of Parliament in significant numbers. Hung parliaments were thus rare, especially during the 19th century. The possibility of change arose when, in the aftermath of the Act of Union, 1800, a number of Irish MPs took seats in the House, though initially these followed the traditional alignments. However, two Reform Acts (in 1867 and in 1884) significantly extended the franchise and redrew the constituencies, and coincided with a change in Irish politics. Following the 1885 general election, neither party had an overall majority. The Irish Parliamentary Party held the balance of power and made Irish Home Rule a condition of their support. However, the Liberal Party split on the issue of Irish Home Rule, leading to another general election in 1886, in which the Conservatives won the most seats and governed with the support of the fragment of Liberalism opposed to Home Rule, the Liberal Unionist Party.

Both the election of January 1910, and that of December 1910 produced a hung parliament with an almost identical number of seats won by the governing Liberal Party and the Conservative Party. This was due both to the constitutional crisis and to the rise of the Labour Party. The elections of 1929 resulted in the last hung parliament for many years; in the meantime, Labour had replaced the Liberals as one of the two dominating parties.

Since the elections of 1929, three general elections have resulted in hung parliaments in the UK. The first was the election in February 1974, and the ensuing parliament lasted only until October. The second was the May 2010 election, the result of which was a hung parliament with the Conservative party as the largest single party. The results for the three main parties were: Conservatives 306, Labour 258, Liberal Democrats 57. The third one resulted from the snap election held in June 2017 that had been called for by Theresa May in order to strengthen her majority heading into Brexit negotiations later in 2017. However, this election backfired on May and her Conservative Party, resulting in a hung parliament after the snap election.

The formation of the coalition resulting from the 2010 election led to the Fixed-term Parliaments Act 2011, which instituted fixed five-year Parliaments and transferred the power to call early elections from the Monarch on the advice of Prime Minister to Parliament itself. This was the idea of the Deputy Prime Minister Nick Clegg, then the leader of the Liberal Democrats, who said that this would stop the Prime Minister and leader of the Conservative Party, David Cameron, from calling a snap election to end the hung parliament, as many other Conservatives had requested. This act was revoked in 2022 through the Dissolution and Calling of Parliament Act 2022 to return the powers of dissolution to the Monarch.

Hung parliaments can also arise when slim government majorities are eroded by by-election defeats and defection of Members of Parliament to opposition parties, as well as resignations of MPs from the House of Commons. This happened in December 1996 to the Conservative government of John Major (1990–97) and in mid-1978 to the Labour government of James Callaghan (1976–79); this latter period covers the era known as the Winter of Discontent. The minority government of Jim Callaghan came when Labour ended their 15-month Lib–Lab pact with the Liberals, having lost their majority in early 1977.

According to researchers Andrew Blick and Stuart Wilks-Heeg, the phrase "hung parliament" did not enter into common usage in the UK until the mid-1970s. It was first used in the press by journalist Simon Hoggart in The Guardian in 1974.

Academic treatments of hung parliaments include David Butler's Governing Without a Majority: Dilemmas for Hung Parliaments in Britain (Sheridan House, 1986) and Vernon Bogdanor's 'Multi-Party Politics and the Constitution' (Cambridge University Press, 1983).

== Consequences ==
In countries where parliaments under majority control are the norm, a hung parliament is often viewed as an unusual and undesirable election result, leading to relatively weak and unstable government. A period of uncertainty after the election is common, as major party leaders negotiate with independents and minor parties to establish a working majority.

An aspiring head of government may seek to build a coalition government; in Westminster systems, this typically involves agreement on a joint legislative programme and a number of ministerial posts going to the minor coalition partners, in return for a stable majority. Alternatively, a minority government may be formed, establishing confidence and supply agreements in return for policy concessions agreed in advance, or relying on case by case support.

=== Australia ===
In the Western Australian state election of 2008 the Australian Labor Party won more seats than the Liberal Party at 28 to 24. The National Party along with three independents had the seats needed to give either party a majority. To help the Liberal Party form government, the Nationals supported the party on the condition that the Royalties for Regions policy was implemented.

In the 1999 Victorian state election, the Labor Party won 42 seats, while the incumbent Liberal National Coalition retained 43, with three seats falling to independents. The Labor Party formed a minority government with the three independents.

The 2010 Tasmanian state election resulted in a hung parliament. After a period of negotiation, the incumbent Labor government led by David Bartlett was recommissioned, but containing the Leader of the Tasmanian Greens, Nick McKim, as a minister, and the Greens' Cassy O'Connor as Cabinet Secretary.

In the 2010 federal election, neither Labor nor the Liberal coalition secured the majority of seats required to form a Government in their own right. In order to counter the potential instability of minority government involved groups may negotiate written agreements defining their terms of support. Such measures were undertaken by the Gillard Government in 2010.

=== France ===
In the 1988 French legislative elections, a hung parliament occurred with the Socialists as the largest party. Following talks with parliamentary leaders, Prime Minister Michel Rocard formed a new minority government, incorporating centrist ministers in a sort of unofficial coalition with the pivotal independent centrist group in the Assembly, ensuring a somewhat stable government until 1991. His direct successors, Prime Ministers Édith Cresson and Pierre Bérégovoy, both formed minority governments, relying alternately on the Communists' or the Centrists' support in Parliament (depending on the issue).

In the 2022 French legislative elections, a hung parliament occurred again with President Macron's Ensemble coalition as the largest bloc in the National Assembly. Both the President and the Prime Minister held talks with opposition leaders in order to try forming a coalition government with the centre-right (LR) and the centre-left (PS and the Greens), or at least reaching some sort of confidence-and-supply deal with them. Talks rapidly failed since no opposition party showed interest in propelling Macron's administration. In July 2022, Prime Minister Borne reshuffled her Cabinet and officially formed a minority government. As of October 2026, France has seen 4 more premierships since Macron's second term commenced.

=== India ===
In India, if an election results in a 'hung assembly' in one of the state Legislative Assemblies and no party is capable of gaining confidence, then fresh elections are announced to be held as soon as possible. Until this occurs President's Rule is applied. In India there have been many situations of hung assemblies in the state legislatures. However, invariably, the President of India in the case of Lok Sabha elections and the Governor of the state concerned, in the case of state elections, would attempt to give opportunities to the parties, starting with the one that got the maximum number of seats in the elections, to explore possibilities of forming a coalition government, before bringing in President's Rule.

=== New Zealand ===
The first such occasion was in 1911 when the Liberal Party won fewer seats than the opposition Reform Party despite tallying the most votes. A vote of no confidence was placed by Reform and the Liberals survived by just one vote. This prompted Prime Minister Sir Joseph Ward to resign, his replacement Thomas Mackenzie was later defeated in July 1912 in a vote with several MPs and Labour crossing the floor to vote with the opposition, the last time in New Zealand history a government has changed on a confidence vote. This broke 23 years of Liberal governance and William Massey formed a new Reform Party government. Massey governed through to his death in 1925, though in 1922 the Reform Party suffered major losses and Massey was forced negotiate with several Independent MPs to retain power.

In 1928, Reform were ousted from governance and Joseph Ward once again won back power. However, the Reform and United (Liberal) parties were tied on seats with Labour holding the balance of power. Labour chose to back Ward rather than let Reform leader Gordon Coates remain in office. In the next election in 1931, there was again a three-way deadlock. On this occasion the Reform and United parties became a coalition government out of mutual fear of Labour's ever-increasing appeal as the Great Depression worsened.

1993 was the last time a hung parliament occurred in New Zealand. Governor-General Dame Catherine Tizard asked Sir David Beattie to form a committee, along with three retired appeal court judges, to decide whom to appoint as Prime Minister. However, National won an extra seat after special votes were counted, giving National 50 seats and Labour 45 seats (4 were won by third-party candidates). Labour's Sir Peter Tapsell agreed to become Speaker of the New Zealand House of Representatives. As a result, National did not lose a vote in the house and maintained a dubious majority for three years.

=== United Kingdom ===
In the February 1974 general election, no party gained an overall parliamentary majority. Labour won the most seats (301, which was 17 seats short of an overall majority) with the Conservatives on 297 seats, although the Conservatives had a larger share of the popular vote. As the incumbent Prime Minister, Edward Heath remained in office attempting to build a coalition with the Liberals. When these negotiations were unsuccessful Heath resigned and Labour led by Harold Wilson took over in a minority government.

In the 2010 UK general election, another hung parliament occurred with the Conservatives as the largest party, and discussions followed to help create a stable government. This resulted in agreement on a coalition government, which was also a majority government, between the Conservative Party, which won the most votes and seats in the election, and the Liberal Democrats.

In the 2017 UK general election, a hung parliament occurred for the second time in seven years with the Conservatives again being the largest party. The Conservatives led by Theresa May formed a minority government, supported by a confidence-and-supply agreement with the Northern Ireland's Democratic Unionist Party.

== Working majority ==
There have been occasions when, although a parliament or assembly is technically hung, the party in power has a working majority. For example, in the United Kingdom, the tradition is that the Speaker and Deputy Speakers do not vote and Sinn Féin MPs never take their seats per their policy of abstentionism, so these members can be discounted from the opposition numbers.

=== United Kingdom ===
In 2005, this was the case in the 60-seat National Assembly for Wales, where Labour lost their majority when Peter Law was expelled for standing against the official candidate in the 2005 Westminster election in the Blaenau Gwent constituency. When the Assembly was first elected on 1 May 2003, Labour won 30 seats, Plaid Cymru won 12, the Conservatives won 11, Liberal Democrats won 6, and the John Marek Independent Party won a seat.

When Dafydd Elis-Thomas (Plaid Cymru) was reelected as the presiding officer, this reduced the number of opposition AMs who could vote to 29, as the presiding officer votes only in the event of a tie and, even then, not on party political lines but according to Speaker Denison's rule. Thus, Labour had a working majority of one seat until Law ran in Blaenau Gwent.

== See also ==
- Coalition government
- Cohabitation (government)
- Divided government
- Minority government
