= Pentre Broughton Halt railway station =

Former railway station in Wrexham, Wales

Pentre Broughton Halt

General information
- Location: Brynteg, Wrexham County Borough; Wales
- Coordinates: 53.0627°N 3.0295°W
- Grid reference: SJ311522
- Platforms: 1

Other information
- Status: Disused

History
- Original company: Great Western Railway
- Pre-grouping: Great Western Railway
- Post-grouping: Great Western Railway

Key dates
- 1 May 1905: Opened
- 1 January 1931: Closed
Location

Pentre Broughton Halt railway station was a station in Brynteg, Wrexham, Wales. The station was opened on 1 May 1905 and closed on 1 January 1931.

Preceding station	Disused railways	Following station
Gwersyllt Hill Halt; Line and station closed	Great Western Railway; Moss Valley Branch	Gatewen Halt; Line and station closed
