= Caego =

Village in Wales

Coordinates: 53.053°N 3.026°W

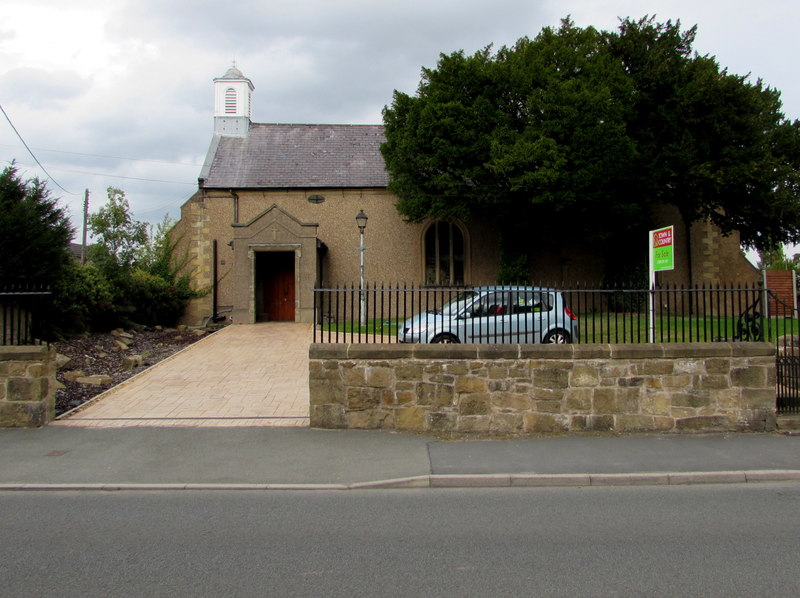
- Former Berse Drelincourt Church, Caego

- Location within Wrexham
- OS grid reference: SJ311511
- Community: Broughton
- Principal area: Wrexham
- Preserved county: Clwyd
- Country: Wales
- Sovereign state: United Kingdom
- Post town: WREXHAM
- Postcode district: LL11
- Dialling code: 01978
- Police: North Wales
- Fire: North Wales
- Ambulance: Welsh
- UK Parliament: Clwyd South
- Senedd Cymru – Welsh Parliament: Clwyd South

Caego is a village in Wrexham County Borough, Wales, immediately to the west of the city of Wrexham in the community of Broughton. It is contiguous with the neighbouring larger village of New Broughton; the main road passing through the centre of the village is the B5101. Its name can perhaps be translated as "the field (cae) of the smith".

The village lies in the parish of Berse, whose name has the same origin as the nearby village of Bersham. The name, still sometimes applied to the area of Caego, was originally that of a common and later came to apply to the whole township of Berse or Bersham; it may be based on an Old English personal name or on the Middle English word "berse", meaning a hedge of osiers. Nearby farms are still known as Higher Berse and Little Berse. Berse parish, however, was created only in June 1934, when it was formed from parts of the parishes of Rhosddu and Wrexham, while most of the houses making up Caego village were built in the 1930s or later. Many of the pre-World War II houses were built by the brothers, Evan and Robert Thomas Williams.

The village's main landmark is the small eighteenth-century Berse (or Berse Drelincourt) Parish Church, which is now Grade II listed. Originally known as the "Capel Madam", it was built in 1742 by Mrs Mary Drelincourt, widow of Peter or Pierre Drelincourt (1644–1722), the Dean of Armagh, and was originally attached to a small girls' charity school. The church, which does not have a specific dedication, was consecrated in 1759, enlarged in 1828 (to accommodate pews for landowners Thomas Hayes of Gatewen Hall, and Thomas Fitzhugh of Plas Power), and restored in 1862. As of 2010 the church has been taken out of use and put up for sale by the Church in Wales.

The Great Western Railway's branch to the Moss Valley ran through the village until the 1930s. It was reinstated for a period in the 1960s and 1970s to serve a coal disposal point at Gatewen.
