= Pandy, Gwersyllt =

Village in Wrexham County Borough, Wales

Coordinates: 53°04′20″N 2°59′36″W

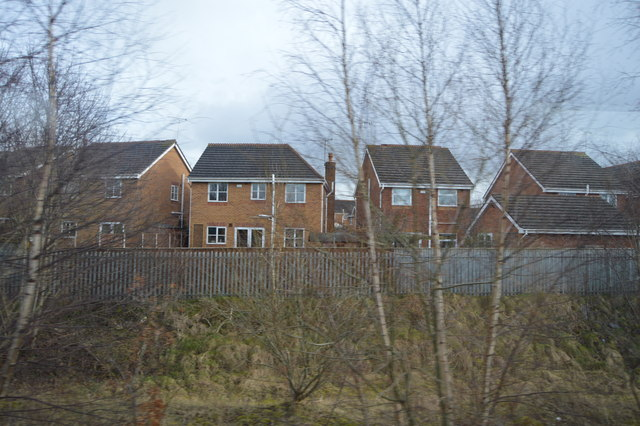
Rears of houses in Pandy from the Shrewsbury–Chester railway line

Pandy (Welsh: Y Pandy; standardised: Pandy; meaning the fulling mill) is a village near Gwersyllt and Rhosrobin, in Wrexham, Wrexham County Borough, Wales. The main entrance to Gresford Colliery stood in the village. Gresford Colliery Social Club is in the village and alongside it a memorial to the Gresford Disaster, which killed 266 men on September 22, 1934.

Plas Acton Road originally linked the village to the main Chester Road, but was severed by the construction of the A483 by-pass. A footbridge crosses the new road maintaining the link for pedestrians. There are the remains of a mill on the River Alyn just below the village at the rear of the Pandy Business Park, in an area known as "The Wilderness".

The Gresford Heath estate, built around the year 2000 on the site of the coalsheds for the former Colliery, doubled the population of the village. The naming reflects an attempt to raise house values in a former industrial village and to 'deWelshify' the village name. A new development of 9 luxury houses has been built on the site of the former Goodwins Milk/Express Dairies depot. There have been further plans for housing to go on the nearby fields to Pandy but local people have objected to more houses.

The coal tip on the edge of the village is the proposed site of a development of a dry ski slope, located on the main Wrexham - Chester road. There are two small industrial estates in the village again on the old Colliery site.
