= Summerhill, Wrexham =

Village in Wales

Coordinates: 53.069°N 3.026°W

Summerhill: Welsh: Brynhyfryd
- Location within Wrexham
- OS grid reference: SJ313529
- Community: Gwersyllt
- Principal area: Wrexham
- Preserved county: Clwyd
- Country: Wales
- Sovereign state: United Kingdom
- Post town: WREXHAM
- Postcode district: LL11
- Dialling code: 01978
- Police: North Wales
- Fire: North Wales
- Ambulance: Welsh
- UK Parliament: Wrexham
- Senedd Cymru – Welsh Parliament: Wrexham

Summerhill (Welsh: Brynhyfryd, pronounced [brɪnˈhəvrɪd]) is a semi-urban village in the suburbs of Wrexham, Wales and forms part of the community of Gwersyllt.

== Industry and History ==
In the 19th and early 20th century, Summerhill was predominantly focused around local farming or coalmining industries, however there was also nearby Brymbo Steelworks and Bersham Ironworks for those who could travel. The nearest colliery was Westminster Colliery, located within the Moss Valley. Most of the area's coalmining industry was closed by the mid 20th century. Remnants of the area's former industrial history include disused features such as railway trackbeds, bridges and tunnels, particularly surrounding the Moss Valley areas.

Throughout the 1970s and 1980s, a number of housing developments increased the local population and the overall size and shape of the village. Developments in the village include White Lion Estate, built in the 1990s, and more recent developments including Summerhill Park and Westminster Rise, built in the 21st century.

== Local services ==
There are few local services in the village, as most needs are provided by nearby Gwersyllt village. Summerhill's post office was closed in 2008 by Royal Mail's restructuring of the rural Post Office network. Summerhill is linked to Wrexham by the historic Summerhill Road, which at the southern boundary of the village, splits into "Top Road" and "Bottom Road". Summerhill is administered as part of Gwersyllt Community Council within the County Borough of Wrexham.

== See also ==
- Gwersyllt
