= Wheatsheaf Junction =

Former railway junction

Wheatsheaf Junction was the location where a branch of the North Wales Mineral Railway to Brymbo connected with Shrewsbury and Chester line between Wrexham and Gresford.

The junction, which was 1.3 mi (2.1 km) from Wrexham General station, was built in 1844 during the period known as Railway Mania. It was designed to facilitate the connection between the mineral areas of Brymbo with Chester, Wrexham and Ruabon. The junction takes its name from the Wheatsheaf public house in Gwersyllt (at 53°04′19″N 3°01′09″W) under which the line ran. The branch, which was very straight in places, went directly up Gwersyllt Hill through the 220 ft (67 m) Summerhill Tunnel to Westminster Colliery. It then continued to the other side of Moss Valley through the 400 ft (120 m) Brymbo Tunnel to Brymbo Steelworks. Due to the steepness of the line, wagons on these sections were worked on incline planes using a two-rope pulley system known locally as 'brakes'.

In 1862, the Wheatsheaf branch was superseded by a new branch line from the locomotive yard and works at Croes Newydd just south of Wrexham General. The railway, which was called the Wrexham and Minera Branch, connected both Brymbo and the mines and quarries at Minera. It was also a great improvement over the Wheatsheaf line because it could be worked throughout by steam engines. By 1882, the Moss Branch had opened connecting Westminster Colliery at Gwersyllt to Croes Newydd.

Progressively parts of the original Wheatsheaf branch fell into disuse throughout the latter part of the 19th century. By 1918 only a yard for 269 wagons on the branch between Wheatsheaf Junction and Westminster Colliery (at 53°4′31″N 3°1′55″W) remained in operation. The junction was closed and the remaining line lifted after the colliery closed in 1925.
