= Jane Davidson =

Welsh politician (born 1957)

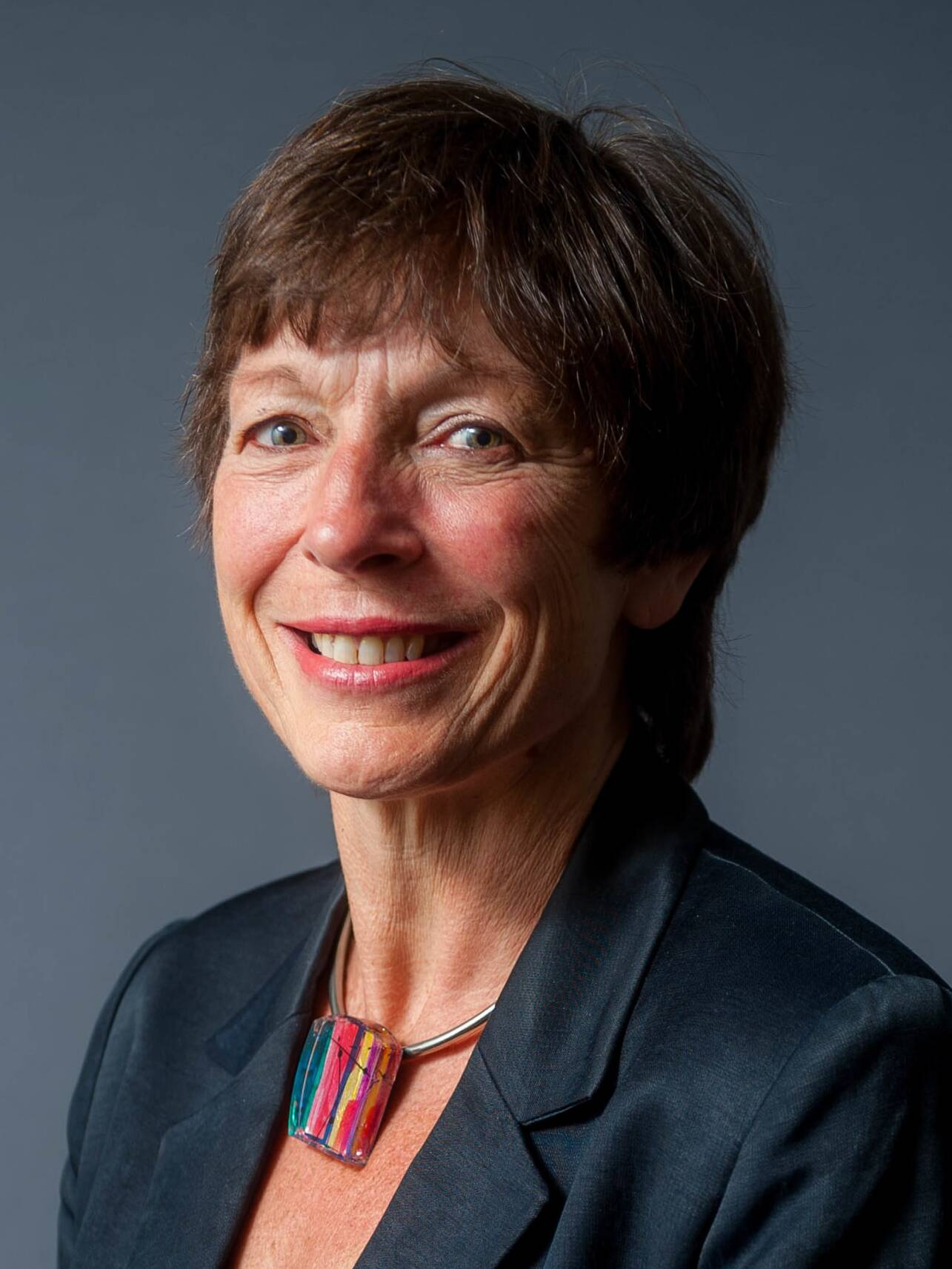
- Official portrait, 2020

Member of the Welsh Assembly for Pontypridd
- In office 6 May 1999 – 6 May 2011
- Preceded by: Office Created
- Succeeded by: Mick Antoniw

Deputy Presiding Officer of the National Assembly for Wales
- In office 12 May 1999 – 10 October 2000
- Preceded by: Office Created
- Succeeded by: John Marek

Personal details
- Born: 19 March 1957 (age 69) Birmingham, England
- Party: Labour
- Education: University of Birmingham, University of Wales

Jane Davidson (born 19 March 1957) is a Welsh former Labour politician, the former Assembly Member for Pontypridd, and served as minister for environment, sustainability and housing in the Welsh Government. She also previously served as the Welsh vice-president of the Ramblers' Association, stepping down when appointed minister for environment, sustainability and housing in 2007. She announced in 2008 that she would not be seeking re-election to the assembly in 2011.

== Professional career ==
Prior to her election to the Welsh Assembly Davidson was a member of Cardiff City Council. In the Assembly she was minister for environment and sustainability in Wales from 2007 to 2011 where she was responsible for the Welsh Government agreeing to make sustainable development its central organising principle. Prior to that she was minister for education and lifelong learning where she introduced a new foundation phase for 3- to 7-year-olds, the Welsh Baccalaureate and Education for Sustainable Development and Global Citizenship (ESDGC) into the Welsh curriculum.

In 2011, following her ministerial career and subsequent move to West Wales as planned, Davidson took up employment as director of the Wales Institute for Sustainability at the local Trinity St David University shortly afterwards, which intends to introduce sustainability content into every student's experience from 2013.

In 2017, Jane was guest faculty in the Executive Education for Sustainability Leadership programme at Harvard University's T.H. Chan School of Public Health.

== Contributions to public policy ==
Davidson was the third most influential environmentalist in the UK for the Independent on Sunday in 2009 and has been Resource magazine's number one and two in 2009 and 2010 for her work on waste. She holds honorary fellowships from CIW (Chartered Institute of Waste) and CIWEM (Chartered Institute of Water and Environmental Management) and is a member of WWF's UK Council of Global Ambassadors. Davidson was a judge on the 2011 Green Awards and is a member of the Telegraph's summit team writing about the green economy in the run up to Rio+20.

Senedd
Preceded by (new post)	Assembly Member for Pontypridd; 1999–2011	Succeeded by Mick Antoniw
Preceded by (new post)	Deputy Presiding Officer of the National Assembly for Wales; 1999–2000	Succeeded by John Marek
Political offices
Preceded by (new post)	Minister for Education, Lifelong Learning and Skills; 2000–2007	Succeeded by Carwyn Jones
Preceded by (new post)	Minister for Sustainability and Rural Development; 2007 (31 May to 19 July)	Succeeded by (post reorganised)
Preceded by (post reorganised)	Minister for Environment, Sustainability and Housing; 2007–2011	Succeeded by John Griffiths
