= Mary Drelincourt =

Welsh benefactor

- Born: Mary Morris c. 1678 near Wrexham, Wales
- Died: 1755 (aged 76–77)

Mary Drelincourt (c. 1678 – 1755) was a Welsh benefactor, and wife of Peter Drelincourt, Dean of Armagh.

== Life ==
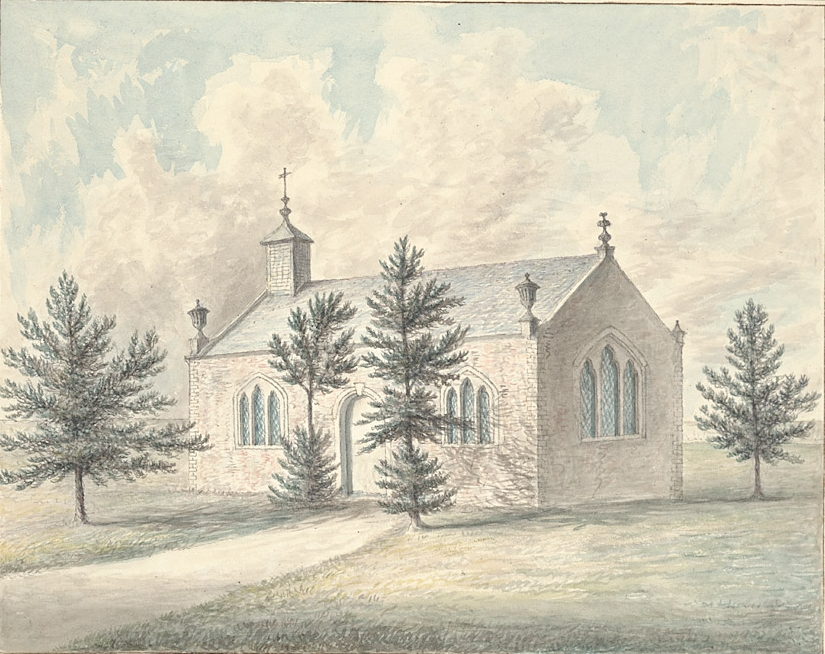
Berse Chapel, 1794

Mary Drelincourt was born Mary Morris around 1678 near Wrexham, north Wales. Her parents were Peter and Margaret Morris. In 1690, her father was briefly the Dean of Derry. She had three brothers and one sister. One brother, Edward (Maurice), became the Bishop of Ossory from 1754 to 1756).

Drelincourt commissioned John Michael Rysbrack to create a monument to her husband in St Patrick's Cathedral, Armagh. In 1732 she founded the Drelincourt charity schools in Armagh, as well as the Berse-Drelincourt school on her estate at Berse, Wales. She also built a church in Caego, Berse in 1742. She established an endowment to support the poor of the conforming French church in Dublin. Her choice of charitable projects was influenced by her husband, who in his will had left £5,000 for their daughter on her marriage, if Drelincourt approved of the match. If she did not approve, the money was to be used for charitable works. Drelincourt died in 1755.

Her daughter, Ann (born 1709), went on to become a viscountess, Lady Primrose. She continued her parents' charitable work, bequeathing money to Armagh in 1775 which was used to install the first piped water supply to the city.
