= Ysgol Bryn Alyn =

Secondary school in Gwersyllt, Wrexham CB, Wales

Location
- Church Street; Gwersyllt, Wrexham CB, LL11 3HB; Wales; 53.0749°N 3.0239°W

Information
- Type: Secondary School
- Motto: Dream Reach Achieve
- Established: 1978
- Local authority: Wrexham
- Head teacher: Adele Slinn
- Age: Year 7 (11/12) to Year 11 (15/16)
- Houses: Ty Glyndwr, Ty Campbell, Ty Llywellyn, Ty Morgan, Ty Cadwaldr, Ty Gwenllian
- Website: Old: New:

Ysgol Bryn Alyn is a secondary school in the county borough of Wrexham, Wales. Its catchment area includes its local primary schools within Gwersyllt and other nearby villages.

== Subjects ==
Subjects That KS3 And KS4 can include

- Art
- Business Studies
- Dance
- Drama
- English
- Food Technology
- Geography
- History
- Mathematics
- Media Studies
- Music
- P.E
- P.S.E
- R.E
- Science
- Spanish
- Technology (Design)
- Technology (ICT)
- Welsh

== Curriculum ==
At Key Stage 3 (KS3), students at Ysgol Bryn Alyn are taught all the mandatory subjects required by the Welsh National Curriculum. At the end of Key Stage 2 pupils are given Teacher Assessment (TA) levels from 3 to 7 in their core and foundation subjects. A special presentation afternoon during the year celebrates the achievement of Year 9 pupils throughout KS3.

At Key Stage 4 (GCSE level), students select two subjects to which they wish to study, alongside mandatory English, English Literature Mathematics, Double Science, Welsh Short Course and PE Full Course. Recently, college course opportunities at Coleg Cambria have been offered, however pupils wishing to opt for one of these lose an option subject. These are chosen in Year 9. Non-exam subjects are Physical Education and PSE. Students select up to two (plus two reserves) of the following WJEC GCSE subjects:

- Art
- Business Studies
- Child Development
- Design Technology
- Drama
- ICT
- Design Technology
- Spanish
- Media Studies
- Music
- Physical Education
- RS Full Course
- Welsh Full

There are also other subjects which can be mixed with GCSE subjects, but a GCSE is not obtained at the end of these courses:

- Working with the community

== Structure of the school day and pupil management ==
The school day in its current form was launched in June 2019. It consists of five 60-minute lessons, and then the final lesson ends at the day at 3.00pm plus a 20 minute form time which starts at 08:40am and is used for Assembelies and Revision sessions

The School Day Starts At 8:40am when Students enter Form Time (Where they are marked in for the day), Then 2 Lessons Start From 9:00am Onwards until 11:00am when break starts. At 11:20am, 2 More lessons start until 1:20pm when Lunchtime starts, Students Have 40 minutes to eat lunch.Lesson 5 Starts at 2:00pm until 3:00pm when school ends

Many extra-curricular clubs are held in the school, including Music and Library activities, There also a Wide range of clubs in Lunchtimes for Year 7s including Tech Club (Tuesdays Y7s), Drama Club (Monday Lunchtimes All year Groups) and Music Club-(Every Thursday All year groups) even with after school clubs like Film Club, Netball, Rounders and Football.

== Facilities ==
The school has many facilities, including five ICT suites, a full (off-site at Gwyn Evans) indoor swimming pool, a MUGA (Multi-Use Games Area), a sports hall, a Science Block and a library with a wide selection of fiction and non-fiction books.

== Refurbishment and front block demolition ==
In 2018 construction of a new Humanities block and improved facilities was completed, Including a Food Technology classroom and a Design Technology classroom.

== Achievements ==
Awards given to the school include the following:

Best Canteen in Wales 2011

Secondary School Of The Year 2025 [Leader education awards]

Green Flag status (2025) [Eco Schools]

== See also ==
- Wrexham
- Wrexham County Borough
- Investor in People
