= Broughton, Wrexham =

Community in Wrexham County Borough, Wales

Broughton
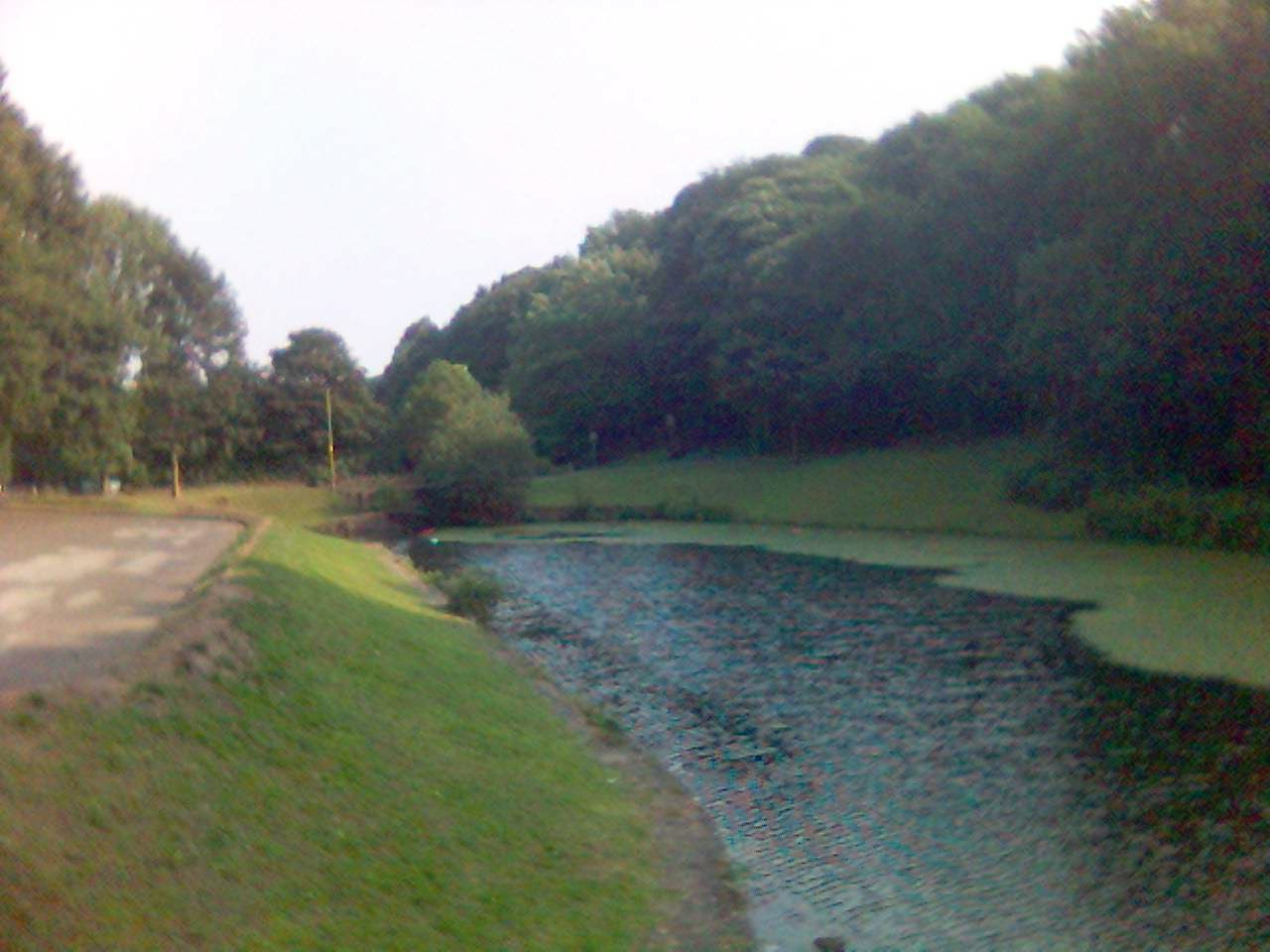
- Moss Valley

- Location within Wrexham
- Population: 7,454 (2011)
- OS grid reference: SJ307526
- Community: Broughton
- Principal area: Wrexham
- Country: Wales
- Sovereign state: United Kingdom
- Post town: WREXHAM
- Postcode district: LL11
- Dialling code: 01978
- Police: North Wales
- Fire: North Wales
- Ambulance: Welsh
- UK Parliament: Clwyd South
- Senedd Cymru – Welsh Parliament: Clwyd South
- List of places UK Wales Wrexham 53.066°N 3.033°W Map of the community

Broughton is a community in Wrexham County Borough, Wales. It has an area of 469 hectares and had a population of 6,498 in the 2001 census, increasing to 7,454 at the 2011 Census. The area is dominated by the Moss Valley, which was known for its coal mining. Today it is operated as a country park, and there is a golf course of the same name in the vicinity.

== History ==
Broughton was recorded in the reign of Henry VII as one of the townships of the manor of Eglwysegle (a name preserved in the area known as Eglwyseg near Llangollen), part of the lordship of Bromfield. The Wrexham historian Alfred Neobard Palmer noted:

Three villages [called Broughton] are situated in that part of Wales which was settled by Englishmen. They appear in Domesday as "Brochetune" or "Broctune," which can hardly mean anything else than "Brook-town". The brook which may have given the Bromfield Broughton its name is now almost always dry, but "Rhyd Broughton" (or Broughton ford) preserves the memory of it.

Under the ecclesiastical administration the township of Broughton was part of the parish of Wrexham, and later of Brymbo. Population changes led to it being made a parish in its own right in 1909.

The corresponding civil parish of Broughton, which was ultimately based on the boundaries of the ancient township, became the community of Broughton under the terms of the Local Government Act 1972. It today contains the villages of Moss, Pentre Broughton, Brynteg, New Broughton, Southsea and Caego. The majority of the villages date from the 19th century, when the area became heavily industrialised through coal mining and its proximity to the Brymbo Steelworks. A number of coal mines were located in the area known as Moss Valley, along with a number in Pentre Broughton near Brymbo such as the Brynmally and Pwll Cadi collieries. Most of the area's coal mines had closed by the 1930s and the Moss Valley has now been reclaimed as a park. Continuing development has urbanised much of the rest of the community's area, with some agricultural land remaining in the south and east. The Moss Valley Golf Club was built in the 1980s by five designers, and was initially run by the local council.
