= Moss Valley Branch =

Former railway line in Wrexham, Wales

Coordinates: 53.0502°N 3.0236°W

Moss Valley branch was a two mile long single track line built by the Great Western Railway in what is now the county borough of Wrexham, Wales. It ran from a junction with the Wrexham and Minera Railway at Moss Valley Junction to Moss Halt (or Moss Platform) via three intermediate stations: Gatewen Halt, Pentre Broughton Halt, and Gwersyllt Hill Halt.

== History ==
Collieries in the Moss valley were originally served by the Great Western Railway's Wheatsheaf Branch, which ran from the Wheatsheaf junction on the Shrewsbury to Chester line. This included a rope-worked incline up Gwersyllt Hill, and the 220 ft Summerhill Tunnel to reach the Moss valley at Westminster Colliery. The line continued across the valley, through the 400 ft Brymbo Tunnel and by a second rope-worked incline, to reach Brymbo Steelworks. In 1862 the western section of the line was replaced by an alternative route between the Chester line and Brymbo, from Croes Newydd Junction over much easier terrain.

The Moss Valley Branch was created by the Great Western Railway – under powers obtained in the Great Western Railway Act 1873 (36 & 37 Vict. c. cxc) – to obviate the cumbersome eastern section of its earlier line from Wheatsheaf Junction; the new route linked with the old near Westminster Colliery, and opened – for goods only – in mid 1882. At its northern end, at Moss Siding signal box, it linked into the Ffrwdd branch and also served collieries (including Westminster) which had previously been served via Wheatsheaf, and additionally Gatewen Colliery nearer its southern end. The new line thus made the western end of the Wheatsheaf Branch redundant.

Passenger services operated from 1 May 1905 but were withdrawn again from 1 January 1931. Of the collieries it served, Ffrwd closed in 1904, Westminster in February 1925, Gatewen in July 1932(although it went on to serve other purposes) and Brynmally in October 1935, whereupon the line beyond Gatewen was closed. The section south of Gatewen had a somewhat chequered career, finally succumbing to a derailment on 18 August 1983, from which it never reopened. Much of the line now forms part of the Moss Valley Park.
