= Gwersyllt =

Village in Wales

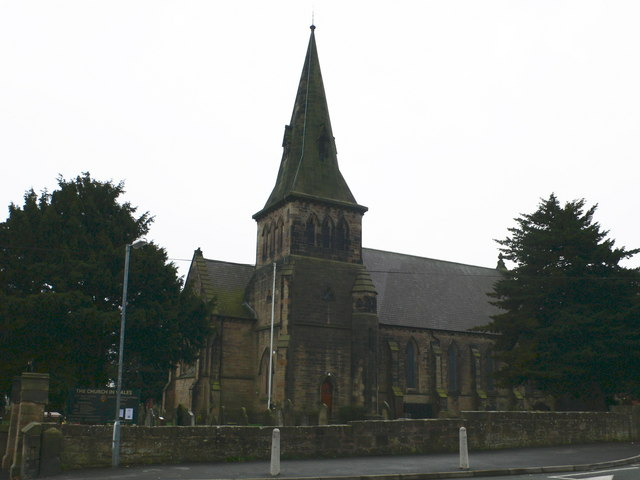
- Gwersyllt's parish church, Holy Trinity

- Location within Wrexham
- Population: 10,677 (2011)
- OS grid reference: SJ316537
- Community: Gwersyllt
- Principal area: Wrexham
- Preserved county: Clwyd
- Country: Wales
- Sovereign state: United Kingdom
- Post town: WREXHAM
- Postcode district: LL11
- Dialling code: 01978
- Police: North Wales
- Fire: North Wales
- Ambulance: Welsh
- UK Parliament: Wrexham
- Senedd Cymru – Welsh Parliament: Wrexham
- List of places UK Wales Wrexham 53.076°N 3.021°W Map of the community

Gwersyllt (Welsh pronunciation: [ɡwɛrsɪɬt]) is an urban village and community in Wrexham County Borough, Wales.

The densely populated village is one of Wrexham's largest and is situated in the north western suburbs of the city, bordering the nearby villages of Llay, Cefn-y-Bedd, Brynteg, and Pentre Broughton. The community, also including the villages of Summerhill, Sydallt, Rhosrobin and Bradley, had a total population of 10,056 at the 2001 census, rising to 10,677 at the 2011 Census.

The name is usually stated to be derived from the Welsh word, gwersyll, meaning "campsite", with the final t common in the area's dialect. This is, however, a comparatively modern form, and during the mediaeval period the name was written as "Wershull" or "Wersull", with "Gwershull" and "Wersham" occurring in the 16th century. It is therefore possible that the present name, like others in the area, is a Welsh adaptation of an earlier English name ending in "-hull" (i.e. "hill"). A derivation from the genitive singular of Old English wearga, with the meaning "[the] felon's hill", "gallowstree hill", has been suggested by placename scholar Melville Richards, although an original form of Wersiges-hyll from an Old English personal name has also been suggested.

== History ==
Gwersyllt was originally a township of the parish of Gresford, and by 1833 had 834 inhabitants. The gradual increase of the area's population in the industrial era led to Gwersyllt being formed as a new parish in 1851, combining the old township of Gwersyllt and parts of the neighbouring township of Stansty. The parish church, from plans by Thomas Penson, was consecrated at the same time.

The village grew rapidly with the local coal mining industry and the area was home to several collieries, of which many features still remain. In 1896, the Gwersyllt coal mine owned by Edward Griffiths had 185 employees with 167 below ground. It was in operation by 1881.

The area was situated between the collieries of the Moss Valley and Bradley and benefitted from good rail links on the former Wrexham, Mold and Connah's Quay Railway to Wrexham, Birkenhead, Ellesmere, Brymbo and New Brighton. A canal also was planned to run through the community with the intention of forming part of the Ellesmere Canal. Evidence of the canal cuttings can still be seen alongside the Sydallt junction between the Summerhill Bottom Road and A541 Mold Road, and a local street, named Heol-y-Camlas, meaning Canal Road in Welsh, lies on the former canal alignment.

In the mid-20th century, large council estates were built amongst the existing village, extending the size of the community and its services substantially.

== Governance ==
Prior to 1974, the civil parish of Gwersyllt fell into the County of Denbighshire and the Wrexham Rural District (however some areas in Gwersyllt were moved to Wrexham Borough in the 20th Century). In 1974, the civil parish became a community of the Borough of Wrexham Maelor, in the County of Clwyd. Since further reorganisation in 1996, the community has been part of the County Borough of Wrexham and the wider preserved county of Clwyd.

Gwersyllt Community Council covers a wider area, including Summerhill, Bradley, Rhosrobin, Moss, Parkwall and Sydallt. For local government purposes, the Community is split into three subdivisions; Gwersyllt North, Gwersyllt West and Gwersyllt East & South.

== Facilities ==
=== Leisure and lifestyle ===
A number of leisure and lifestyle facilities are available for local residents. Gwyn Evans Sports Centre, named after a local councillor and school teacher, is a council-operated leisure centre, consisting of a 25-metre swimming pool and multi-use sports hall, within the grounds of local secondary school, Ysgol Bryn Alyn. The school additionally offers an outdoor astroturf multi-use games area, situated adjacent to the leisure centre. The newly built Gwersyllt Community Resource Centre provides a large bookable function hall and meeting rooms, along with Gwersyllt Library, which is open six days a week.

=== Religion ===
Gwersyllt is predominantly served by two churches, namely Gwersyllt Congregational Church of the evangelical faith, and Holy Trinity Church, which is part of the Church in Wales Anglican denomination. Both date from the Victorian era, with the Congregational Church being the older of the two.

=== Education ===
Gwersyllt has four schools within the community borders: Gwersyllt Community Primary School, Ysgol Heulfan, Ysgol Bro Alun, and Ysgol Bryn Alyn.

Gwersyllt CP and Ysgol Heulfan are both English-medium primary schools. Gwersyllt CP was created in 2007 by the amalgamation of Ysgol y Gaer Infant School with Gwersyllt County Primary Junior School, and Ysgol Heulfan was created in 2005 by the merger of Ysgol Bryn Golau Infants, Ysgol Y Drindod Juniors and Ysgol Powys.

Ysgol Bro Alun is a Welsh-medium primary school which opened in 2013. As of 2022, 34.3% of statutory school age pupils spoke Welsh at home.

Ysgol Bryn Alyn is an 11-16 English-medium secondary school. Post-16 education is provided by Coleg Cambria, formerly Yale College, Wrexham. Welsh-medium pupils from Gwersyllt attend Wrexham's 11-18 secondary school, Ysgol Morgan Llwyd.

A centre for alternative curriculum programmes continues in the former building of Ysgol Powys.

=== Health ===
Pen-y-Maes Health Centre is the local clinic, being staffed by doctors, nurses and regular health visitors, and also incorporates a pharmacy.

Women in the Gwersyllt West ward had the lowest life expectancy at birth, 72.6 years, of any ward in England and Wales in 2016.

=== Industry ===
Gwersyllt's former heavy industries of coalmining and manufacturing have declined over the 20th Century. Much of the former land of these industries has been reclaimed, mostly as housing. However a number of industrial warehouses continue, namely of building supplies, car sales and double-glazing window manufacturing. The Studios is the headquarters of the former Marcher Radio Group, which produces and broadcasts radio programmes to the local Capital FM stations, formally Marcher Sound, Buzz 97.1, Coast 96.3, Champion FM 103, along with Smooth Wales (formerly Classic Gold).

=== Transport ===
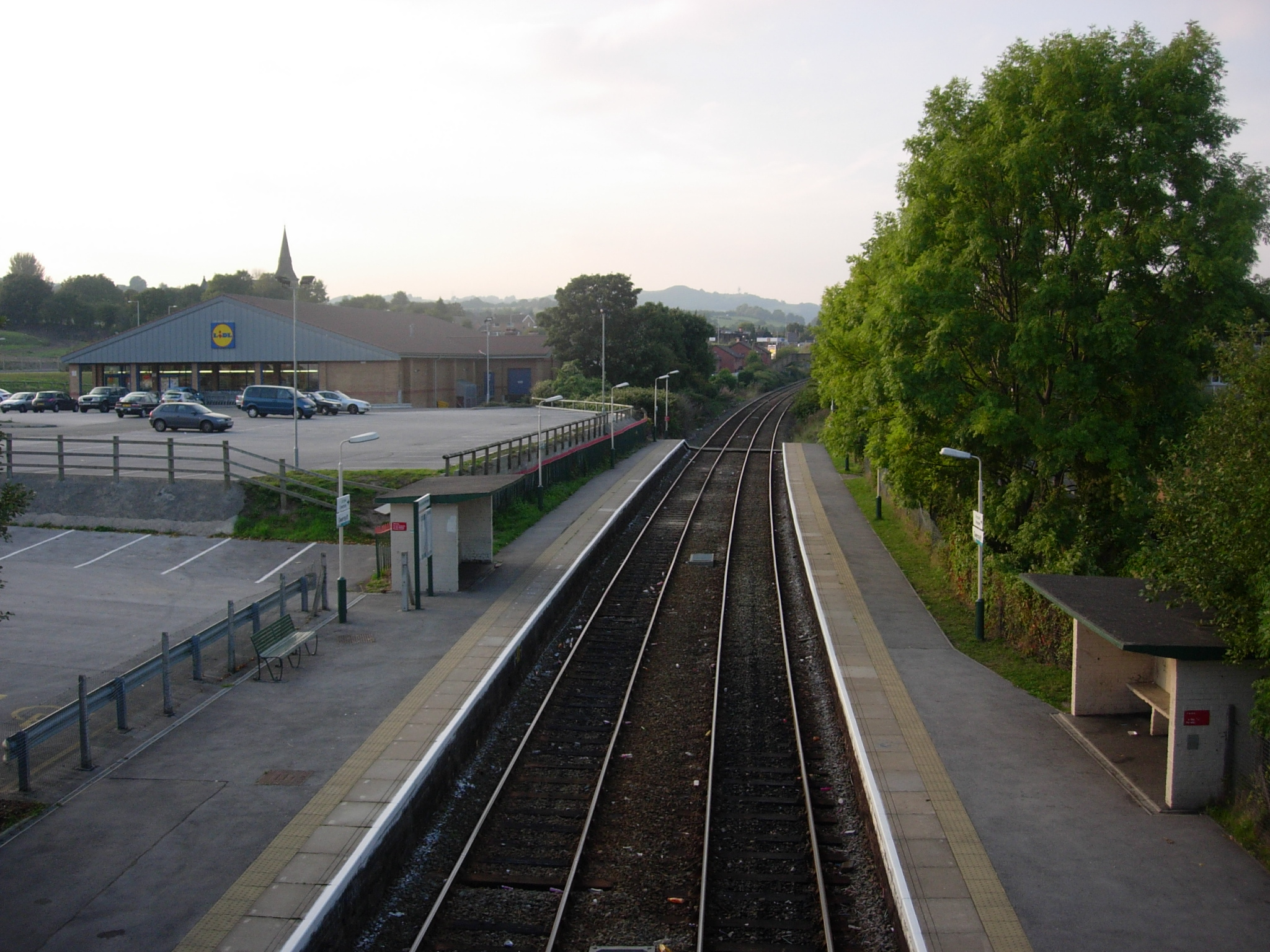
Gwersyllt railway station

The A541 road, locally known as the Mold Road is the main thoroughfare into Wrexham southbound, and northwards through south Flintshire onto Mold. The community is also nearby to the A483 road via the Gresford and Wrexham junctions.

Gwersyllt railway station provides hourly services by rail on the Borderlands Line, southbound to Wrexham Central, and northbound onto Bidston, changing for Merseyrail services to Liverpool Central. All services are operated by Transport for Wales, predominantly using Class 150 and Class 153 diesel multiple units.

Public bus transport is provided by Arriva Buses Wales on services from Wrexham to Summerhill, Mold, Flint and Deeside on Monday to Saturdays. A reduced service operates on Sundays and bank holidays, subsidised by Wrexham Council and provided by Arriva.
