= Sydallt =

Village in Wrexham County Borough, Wales

Coordinates: 53.090°N 3.029°W

Sydallt is a village in Gwersyllt community, Wrexham County Borough, north Wales. It had a population of 422 as of the 2011 UK census.

== Economy ==
In 1877, the Llay Hall Colliery was opened in the village. Later, the Llay Hall brick works was established next to it to use the clay from the lower coal seams. The colliery was privately owned by the Llay Hall Coal, Iron and Fireclay Company until it was nationalised in 1947. It closed shortly afterwards due to a serious underground explosion. The colliery buildings that are still on the site include the winding and fan house, workshops, a weighbridge house and a chimney.

== Local government ==
It is governed by the Gwersyllt Community Council.
