= Peter Drelincourt =

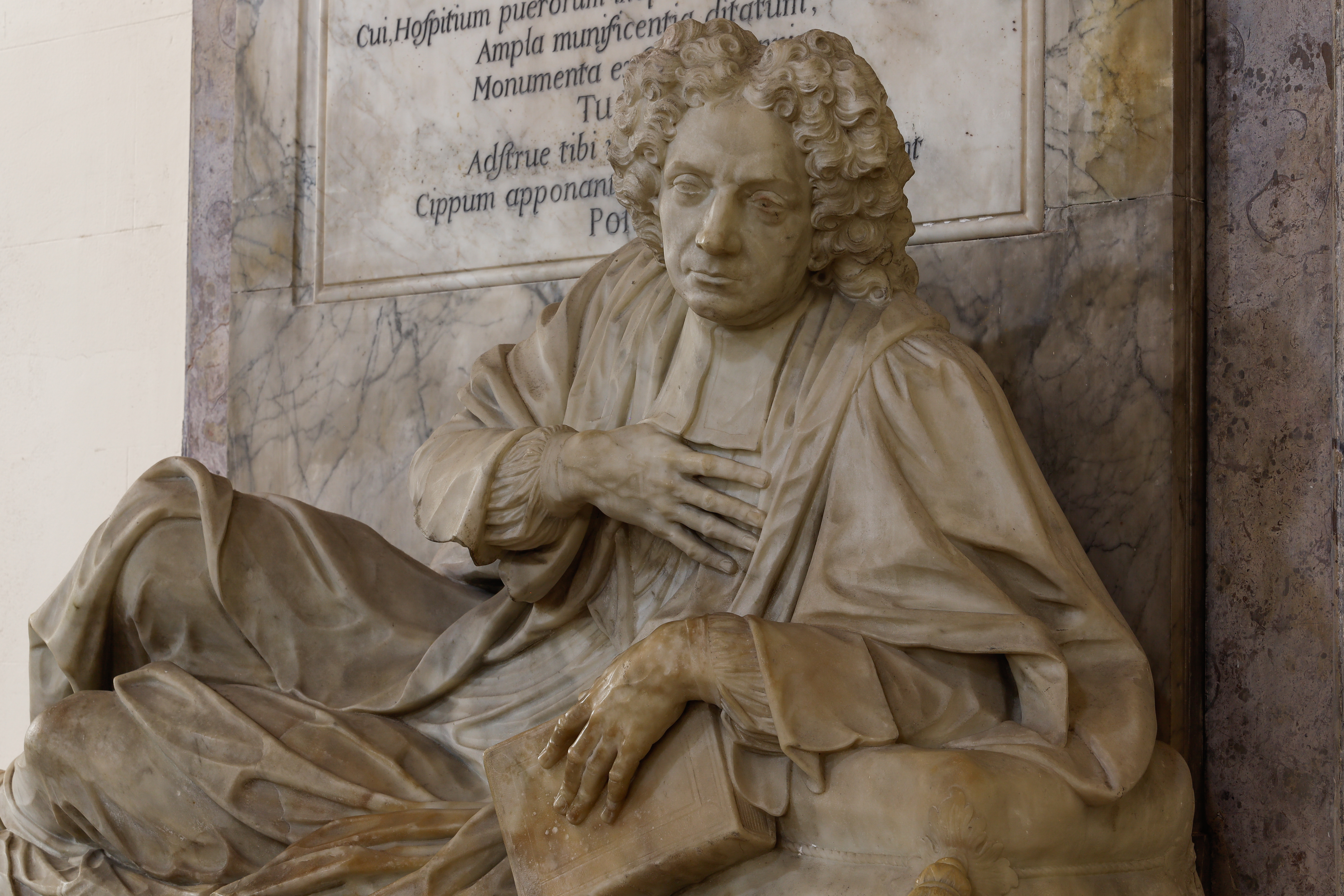
Recumbent figure of Peter Drelincourt in the north aisle of St. Patrick's Cathedral in Armagh, sculpted by John Michael Rysbrack.

Peter Drelincourt (22 July 1644 in Paris – 7 March 1722 in Armagh), was Dean of Armagh. He was the sixth son of Charles Drelincourt, minister of the reformed church in Paris, and graduated M.A. at Trinity College, Dublin, 1681, and LL.D. 1691.

Having been appointed chaplain to the Duke of Ormonde, Lord-Lieutenant of Ireland, he became in 1681 precentor of Christ Church Cathedral, Dublin; in 1683 Archdeacon of Leighlin; and 28 February 1690–1 Dean of Armagh, retaining his archdeaconry, and holding at the same time the rectory of Armagh. He was buried in the Armagh Cathedral, where a fine monument by Rysbrack was erected by his widow to his memory. On a mural tablet, in Latin, is a minute account of his origin and promotions, and on the front of the sarcophagus an inscription in English verse. It alludes to the erection in Armagh of the "Drelincourt Charity School" by the dean's widow, Mary. To their daughter, Viscountess Primrose, the citizens of Armagh are chiefly indebted for a plentiful supply of water.

Drelincourt's only publication is A Speech made to … the Duke of Ormonde, Lord-Lieutenant of Ireland, and to the … Privy Council. To return the humble thanks of the French Protestants lately arriv'd in this kingdom; and graciously reliev'd by them, 4to, Dublin, 1682.
