= New Broughton, Wrexham =

Village in Wrexham County Borough, Wales

Coordinates: 53.054°N 3.028°W

New Broughton
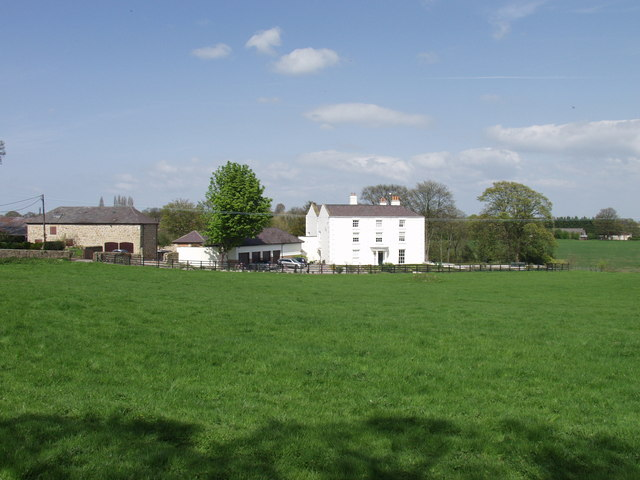
- Gatewen Hall, New Broughton

- Location within Wrexham
- Population: 3,448 (2011)
- OS grid reference: SJ311512
- Community: Broughton
- Principal area: Wrexham
- Country: Wales
- Sovereign state: United Kingdom
- Post town: WREXHAM
- Postcode district: LL11
- Dialling code: 01978
- Police: North Wales
- Fire: North Wales
- Ambulance: Welsh
- UK Parliament: Clwyd South
- Senedd Cymru – Welsh Parliament: Clwyd South

New Broughton (standard Welsh: New Broughton; sometimes Brychdyn Newydd; Welsh pronunciation) is a former industrial village located in Wrexham, North Wales. It is part of the wider Broughton local government community, and is situated between Southsea (to the North) and Caego (to the South). Still widely regarded as a working-class area, in recent years, new housing estates have been built and attracted more middle-class families, who tend to live just outside the village, on the hill.

== Description ==
New Broughton lies on the north‐facing slopes of the Gwenfro valley, two kilometres south-west of Wrexham city centre and contiguous with the settlements of Southsea and Caego. Administratively it forms the eastern half of the Broughton community and is represented on Wrexham County Borough Council within the Bryn Cefn electoral division. The population was 3,173, according to the 2001 census, increasing to 3,448 at the 2011 Census. Small-area population estimates for 2022 give 3,402 residents across the adjoining Lower Super Output Areas New Broughton 1 and 2, with 76 per cent of homes owner-occupied and 19 per cent of adults holding Level 4 qualifications or higher.

The village took shape after 1875–77 when the Old Broughton Coal Company sank Plas Power Colliery on Gatewen Road. Regarded as an advanced pit, it pioneered underground electricity generation and at peak in 1910 employed 1,099 men; output ceased in 1938 when workable reserves were exhausted. A second shaft complex, Gatewen Colliery, was sunk nearby in 1874, opening in 1877 under the Broughton & Plas Power Coal Company. Its workings extended beneath Erddig Park, closing in 1932; the headgear was later reused at Bersham Colliery. Rows of red-brick terraces were laid out off Victoria Road and Railway Terrace to house miners, giving the settlement its dense linear plan.

Since the pits shut, former colliery land has been reclaimed for housing: planning consent in 2008 allowed 140 dwellings on the Gatewen site, while smaller estates now step up Bryn Eglwys hill. Community facilities centre on Ysgol Penrhyn New Broughton Primary School, inspected by Estyn in 2017 and judged 'adequate' for current performance but 'good' for wellbeing; the 2024 roll stood at 276 pupils.
