= John Marek =

British politician

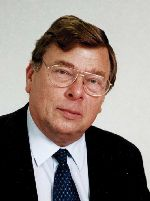
- Official portrait, 2003

Leader of Forward Wales
- In office 8 November 2003 – February 2010
- Preceded by: Position established
- Succeeded by: Position abolished

Leader of the John Marek Independent Party
- In office 31 March 2003 – 8 November 2003
- Preceded by: Position established
- Succeeded by: Position abolished

Deputy Presiding Officer of the Welsh Assembly
- In office 2 May 2000 – 7 May 2007
- Presiding Officer: The Lord Elis-Thomas
- Preceded by: Jane Davidson
- Succeeded by: Rosemary Butler

Member of the Welsh Assembly for Wrexham
- In office 6 May 1999 – 3 May 2007
- Preceded by: Office established
- Succeeded by: Lesley Griffiths

Member of Parliament for Wrexham
- In office 9 June 1983 – 14 May 2001
- Preceded by: Tom Ellis
- Succeeded by: Ian Lucas

Personal details
- Born: 24 December 1940 (age 85) London, England
- Party: Conservative (2010–2016)
- Other political affiliations: Forward Wales (2003–10); John Marek Independent (2003); Labour (1983–2003)
- Education: King's College London

John Marek (born 24 December 1940) is a British politician who served as the Member of Parliament (MP) for Wrexham from 1983 to 2001, and the Member of the Welsh Assembly (AM) for Wrexham from 1999 to 2007. A member of the Labour Party until 2003, he successfully stood for re-election to the Welsh Assembly as a John Marek Independent Party candidate. Marek founded and led Forward Wales from 2003 until 2010, when the party was disbanded and he joined the Conservatives.

== Background ==
Born in London and of Czech descent, Marek would be the only Czech-speaking MP during his tenure. He was educated at Chatham House Grammar School and at King's College London where he earned a BSc in Mathematics in 1962, and a PhD in Mathematics in 1965. He became a lecturer in applied mathematics at Aberystwyth University.

== Political career ==
Marek was elected a member of Ceredigion District Council in 1979 and served until 1983; he was chair of its finance sub-committee in the year 1982–83.

Having previously unsuccessfully contested Ludlow in October 1974, Marek was elected as Labour Party Member of Parliament for the Wrexham Westminster constituency in 1983 and served as a party spokesman on Treasury matters, although he was not offered a government post in 1997.

As a supporter of devolution, he chose to move to the National Assembly for Wales in 1999, and stood down from the UK Parliament in 2001. In the Assembly he became increasingly known as a maverick. In 2000, he was elected as Deputy Presiding Officer against the candidate preferred by the Labour leadership. This move, and his frequent criticisms of the Labour-led Wrexham County Borough led to his deselection as the Labour Party's candidate for the National Assembly elections of 1 May 2003.

Marek then stood as a candidate for the John Marek Independent Party and defeated the official Labour Party candidate, Lesley Griffiths, a former secretary of his, by 973 votes. Later that year he formed a new political party called Forward Wales (Welsh: Cymru Ymlaen). He ran for re-election in the 2007 Welsh Assembly election, but was defeated by Labour's Lesley Griffiths by 1,250 votes, thanks to a swing to the Conservatives, Liberal Democrats, and UKIP.

On 29 March 2010, Marek joined the Conservative Party, and was a member until 2016. He was confirmed as the party's candidate for the 2011 Welsh Assembly election where he again came second to Griffiths, by 3,335 votes in the Wrexham constituency.

Marek is one of three Welsh MPs or AMs to win a constituency as both a party candidate and an independent, following S. O. Davies who was MP for Merthyr Tydfil from 1934 until his death in 1972, who was deselected by the local Labour Party on grounds of age prior to the 1970 general election but ran against the official candidate as an independent and won; and Peter Law who was barred from contesting his seat for Labour due to an all-woman shortlist being imposed

== Bridge ==
Marek won the Welsh Cup in Bridge in 1972-3 and played for Wales in the Camrose Trophy in 1976 & 1977.

== Wrexham AFC ==
In 2006, Marek was appointed as Vice President of Wrexham A.F.C. by then owners Nev Dickens and Geoff Moss. He remained in the position until the club passed into the ownership of the Wrexham Supporters Trust.

Parliament of the United Kingdom
| Preceded by Tom Ellis | Member of Parliament for Wrexham; 1983–2001 | Succeeded by Ian Lucas |
Senedd
| Preceded by New post | Assembly Member for Wrexham; 1999–2007 | Succeeded by Lesley Griffiths |
| Preceded by Jane Davidson | Deputy Presiding Officer of the National Assembly for Wales; 2000–2007 | Succeeded by Rosemary Butler |
