= Pentre Broughton =

Village in Wrexham County Borough, Wales

Coordinates: 53.069°N 3.037°W

- Location within Wrexham
- OS grid reference: SJ306530
- Community: Broughton
- Principal area: Wrexham
- Preserved county: Clwyd
- Country: Wales
- Sovereign state: United Kingdom
- Post town: Wrexham
- Postcode district: LL11
- Dialling code: 01978
- Police: North Wales
- Fire: North Wales
- Ambulance: Welsh
- UK Parliament: Clwyd South
- Senedd Cymru – Welsh Parliament: Clwyd South

Pentre Broughton is a formerly industrial village in the community of Broughton in Wrexham County Borough, Wales. It is contiguous with the neighbouring villages of Moss and Brynteg.

The village's name is derived from the Welsh word pentre ("village") along with Broughton, the name of the township of the parish of Wrexham (later Brymbo) in which it was located. The English place-name "Broughton" appears in the Domesday Book survey of the area and probably means "brook town".

Much of the village dates from the later 19th century, after industrial expansion in the area, but it appears on the 1873 Ordnance Survey of Denbighshire as "Pentre" and "Pentre isaf" ("lower village"). These place names, rather than "Pentre Broughton", appear on maps until the second half of the 20th century, and the village is still often referred to simply as "Pentre" by local residents.

Pentre Broughton's church, St. Paul's, was built in 1888–89, though it was not consecrated until 1909, shortly before Broughton was made a separate parish in its own right. The church was designed by the architect Howel Davies of Wrexham.

Many of the villages' residents worked in coal mining, or in the Brymbo Steelworks which until its closure in 1990 dominated the view to the north of the village. The Cross Foxes on Pentre High Street was formerly the meeting place for the area's mineworkers' unions; at one 19th century meeting, over 6000 people gathered there for a demonstration.
