= Southsea, Wrexham =

Village in Wrexham County Borough, Wales

Coordinates: 53.059°N 3.043°W

Southsea: Welsh: Glanrafon
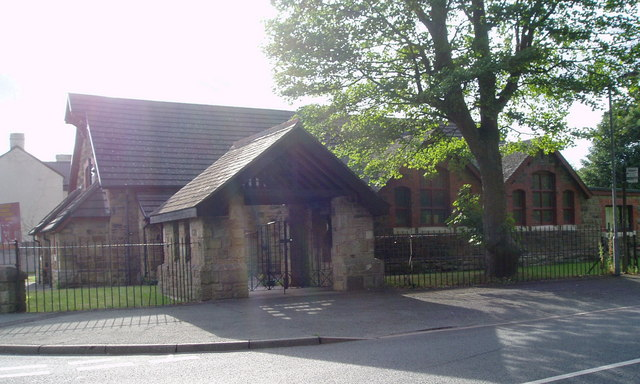
- Southsea church, formerly the church hall

- Location within Wrexham
- OS grid reference: SJ301518
- Community: Broughton
- Principal area: Wrexham
- Preserved county: Clwyd
- Country: Wales
- Sovereign state: United Kingdom
- Post town: WREXHAM
- Postcode district: LL11
- Dialling code: 01978
- Police: North Wales
- Fire: North Wales
- Ambulance: Welsh
- UK Parliament: Clwyd South
- Senedd Cymru – Welsh Parliament: Clwyd South

Southsea (Welsh: Glanrafon) is a formerly industrial village on the River Gwenfro in Broughton community, Wrexham County Borough, Wales.

The village came into being at the site of the Broughton Hall Brickworks and Plas Power Colliery. Its Welsh language placename (meaning "the bank of the river", glan yr afon) derives from that of a farm. Its exotic-sounding English name, however, comes from the South Sea Inn which used to stand over the road from the brickworks, and in a room of which the brickworks pay was distributed.

The Wrexham historian Alfred Neobard Palmer noted that the name Southsea first appeared on the rate books as early as 1786, though also commenting that this was "an absurd name which should never have been adopted, especially as there was an appropriate name ready to hand".

Southsea's church, All Saints, was formerly its church hall. The previous church, built in 1921 after the original building became unsafe due to mining subsidence, itself became unsafe and was demolished in 1984.
