= John Marek Independent Party =

- Abbreviation: JMIP
- Leader: John Marek
- Founded: March 31, 2003; 22 years ago
- Dissolved: November 8, 2003; 21 years ago
- Ideology: Democratic socialism Pro-Welsh devolution
- Political position: Left-wing

The John Marek Independent Party (JMIP) was a political party in North Wales which eventually evolved into Forward Wales.

== Formation ==
The JMIP was formed in March 2003 by John Marek, after he was deselected by his local constituency Labour Party (CLP) as the official candidate for the Wrexham constituency in the 2003 National Assembly for Wales election. Marek alleged this was over his criticisms of its "perceived rightward march", and that he was the victim of a "smear campaign". Others have alleged this to not be the case, with Jeffrey Cuthbert, then AM for Caerphilly saying that "John Marek did not leave the Labour Party on any point of principle - he wanted to be the party candidate right up to the last minute. It was only when it was clear that the party members in Wrexham wanted someone else that John decided to stand as an independent. John's conversion to far-left politics appears to be very recent."

The JMIP stood for the May 2003 elections to the National Assembly for Wales on a left-wing platform that included public ownership of the railways and greater powers for the Assembly. The media portrayed the JMIP as a real threat to Labour in North-East Wales.

== Electoral Results ==
The party stood in the constituencies of Wrexham and Clwyd South. The party also had a list in the North Wales region. Their candidates were:

- John Marek (Wrexham, former Labour MP/AM)
- Colin Jones (Second on the North Wales List, Anti-War Activist)
- Marc Jones (Clwyd South, BBC Wales Director and Producer)

On 1 May 2003, Marek won Wrexham with 6,539 votes or 37.7% of the vote. Elsewhere they got 2,210 or 11.8% in Clwyd South and 11,008 or 6.3% on the North Wales list. It was the only minor party to retain its deposit in the regional lists and its constituency result compared favourably with other left-wing candidates.

== Re-launch ==
During its existence the JMIP forged strong links with the Scottish Socialist Party, and Tommy Sheridan spoke at its Summer Gathering in August 2003. On 8 November 2003, the JMIP held a conference and re-launched itself as Forward Wales.

== See also ==
- Welsh Socialist Alliance
