= Wrexham (Senedd constituency) =

Senedd constituency (1999–2026)

Coordinates: 53°04′34″N 2°56′59″W

Wrexham Wrecsam
- Former Senedd county constituency for the Senedd

- Wrexham shown within the North Wales electoral region and the region shown within Wales

Former Senedd county constituency
- Created: 1999
- Abolished: 2026
- Party: Labour
- MS: Lesley Griffiths
- Preserved county: Clwyd

Wrexham (Welsh: Wrecsam) was a constituency of the Senedd. It elected one Member of the Senedd by the first past the post method of election. Also, however, it was one of nine constituencies in the North Wales electoral region, which elected four additional members, in addition to nine constituency members, to produce a degree of proportional representation for the region as a whole.

== Boundaries ==
Map of 1999–2026 boundaries

The constituency was created for the first election to the Assembly, in 1999, with the name and boundaries of the Wrexham Westminster constituency. It was entirely within the preserved county of Clwyd.

As created in 1999, the North Wales region included the constituencies of Alyn and Deeside, Caernarfon, Clwyd West, Clwyd South, Conwy, Delyn, Vale of Clwyd, Wrexham and Ynys Môn. For the 2007 Assembly election the region included Aberconwy, Alyn and Deeside, Arfon, Clwyd South, Clwyd West, Delyn, Vale of Clwyd, Wrexham and Ynys Môn.

The constituency of Wrexham was divided into the electoral divisions: Acton, Borras Park, Brynyffynnon, Cartrefle, Erddig, Garden Village, Gresford East and West, Grosvenor, Gwersyllt East and South, Gwersyllt North, Gwersyllt West, Hermitage, Holt, Little Acton, Llay, Maesydre, Marford and Hoseley, Offa, Queensway, Rhosnesni, Rossett, Smithfield, Stansty, Whitegate, Wynnstay.

== Voting ==
In general elections for the Senedd, each voter had two votes. The first vote was used to vote for a candidate to become the Member of the Senedd for the voter's constituency, elected by the first past the post system. The second vote was used to vote for a regional closed party list of candidates. Additional member seats were allocated from the lists by the d'Hondt method, with constituency results being taken into account in the allocation.

== Members of the Senedd ==
Election	Member	Party	Portrait
1999	John Marek	Labour	
2003	John Marek	John Marek Independent Party	
2003	John Marek	Forward Wales	
2007	Lesley Griffiths	Labour	

== Elections ==
=== Elections in the 2020s ===
2021 Senedd election: Wrexham
Party	Candidate	Constituency			Regional		
Party	Candidate	Votes	%	±%	Votes	%	±%
Labour	Lesley Griffiths	8,452	37.4	+0.3	7,450	33.0	+0.4
Conservative	Jeremy Kent	7,102	31.4	+0.8	7,099	31.5	+8.1
Plaid Cymru	Carrie Harper	4,832	21.4	+8.5	4,793	21.2	+8.1
Abolish	Paul Ashton	790	3.5	New	1,000	4.4	–1.0
Liberal Democrats	Timothy Sly	755	3.3	–2.3	778	3.4	–5.1
UKIP	Sebastian Ross	378	1.7	–10.1	350	1.6	–10.5
Reform	Charles Dodman	187	0.8	New	186	0.8	New
Gwlad	Aaron Norton	110	0.5	New	89	0.4	New
Green					545	2.4	–0.6
Freedom Alliance (UK)					116	0.5	New
Propel					59	0.3	New
Communist					55	0.2	–0.1
Independent	Michelle Brown				29	0.1	New
TUSC					15	0.1	New
Majority		1,352	6.0	–0.5			
Turnout		22,606					
Labour hold		Swing					

=== Elections in the 2010s ===
Welsh Assembly Election 2016: Wrexham
Party	Candidate	Constituency			Regional		
Party	Candidate	Votes	%	±%	Votes	%	±%
Labour	Lesley Griffiths	7,552	37.1	−7.7	6,607	32.6	-4.6
Conservative	Andrew Atkinson	6,227	30.6	+3.7	4,747	23.4	-0.4
Plaid Cymru	Carrie Harper	2,631	12.9	−1.0	2,666	13.1	-0.1
UKIP	Jeanette Stefani	2,393	11.8	New	2,458	12.1	+7.6
Liberal Democrats	Beryl Blackmore	1,140	5.6	−8.8	1,729	8.5	-2.9
Green	Alan Butterwoth	411	2.0	New	599	3.0	+1.0
Abolish					1,098	5.4	New
Association of Welsh Independents					134	0.7	New
Monster Raving Loony					123	0.6	New
Communist					68	0.3	±0.0
Mark Young - Independent					57	0.3	New
Majority		1,325	6.5	−11.4			
Turnout		20,354	39.5	+3.3			
Labour hold		Swing	−5.7				

Welsh Assembly Election 2011: Wrexham
Party	Candidate	Constituency			Regional		
Party	Candidate	Votes	%	±%	Votes	%	±%
Labour	Lesley Griffiths	8,368	44.8	+16.0	6,954	37.2	+6.9
Conservative	John Marek	5,031	26.9	+9.7	4,448	23.8	+4.5
Liberal Democrats	Bill Brereton	2,692	14.4	−2.3	2,127	11.4	-6.7
Plaid Cymru	Marc Jones	2,596	13.9	+4.3	2,463	13.2	+1.3
UKIP					834	4.5	-1.2
BNP					598	3.2	-6.2
Socialist Labour					559	3.0	+1.8
Green					379	2.0	-0.6
Welsh Christian					183	1.0	+0.1
Weyman - Independent					84	0.4	New
Communist					58	0.3	±0.0
Majority		3,337	17.9	+11.5			
Turnout		18,687	36.2	−2.6			
Labour hold		Swing	+3.2				

Regional ballots rejected: 240

=== Elections in the 2000s ===
Welsh Assembly Election 2007: Wrexham
Party	Candidate	Constituency			Regional		
Party	Candidate	Votes	%	±%	Votes	%	±%
Labour	Lesley Griffiths	5,633	28.8	−3.3	5,878	30.3	-0.7
Independent	John Marek	4,383	22.4	−15.3			
Conservative	Felicity Elphick	3,372	17.2	+4.4	3,736	19.3	+6.1
Liberal Democrats	Bruce Roberts	3,268	16.7	+6.9	3,508	18.1	+7.3
Plaid Cymru	Sion Aled Owen	1,878	9.6	+1.9	2,307	11.9	+1.2
UKIP	Peter Lewis	1,033	5.3	New	1,105	5.7	+3.4
BNP					1,821	9.4	New
Green					509	2.6	+1.3
Socialist Labour					235	1.2	New
Welsh Christian					180	0.9	New
Communist					53	0.3	New
CPA					41	0.2	New
Majority		1,250	6.4	N/A			
Turnout		19,576	38.8	+4.4			
Labour gain from Independent		Swing					

Welsh Assembly Election 2003: Wrexham
Party	Candidate	Constituency			List		
Party	Candidate	Votes	%	±%	Votes	%	±%
John Marek Independent Party	John Marek	6,539	37.7	N/A	5,163	30.0	New
Labour	Lesley Griffiths	5,566	32.1	−21.0	5,331	31.0	-14.0
Conservative	Janet Finch-Saunders	2,228	12.8	−3.0	2,269	13.2	-3.7
Liberal Democrats	Thomas Philip Rippeth	1,701	9.8	−6.1	1,865	10.8	-4.7
Plaid Cymru	Peter Ryder	1,329	7.7	−7.6	1,833	10.7	-8.9
UKIP					401	2.3	New
Green					223	1.3	Unknown
Cymru Annibynnol					57	0.3	New
Communist					35	0.2	Unknown
Prolife Alliance					16	0.1	New
Majority		973	5.6	N/A			
Turnout		17,363	34.4	+0.2			
Independent gain from Labour		Swing					

2003 Electorate: 50,508
Regional ballots rejected: 294

=== Elections in the 1990s ===
Welsh Assembly Election 1999: Wrexham
Party	Candidate	Constituency			Regional		
Party	Candidate	Votes	%	±%	Votes	%	±%
Labour	John Marek	9,239	53.1	N/A	7,725	45.0	N/A
Liberal Democrats	Carole O’Toole	2,767	15.9	N/A	2,670	15.5	N/A
Conservative	Felicity Elphick	2,747	15.8	N/A	2,896	16.9	N/A
Plaid Cymru	Janet Ryder	2,659	15.3	N/A	3,373	19.6	N/A
Green					Unknown	Unknown	N/A
Rhuddlan Debt Protest Campaign					Unknown	Unknown	N/A
United Socialist					Unknown	Unknown	N/A
Communist					Unknown	Unknown	N/A
Natural Law					Unknown	Unknown	N/A
Above list parties					521	3.0	N/A
Majority		6,472	37.2	N/A			
Turnout		17,412	34.2	N/A			
Labour win (new seat)							

== See also ==
- North Wales (Senedd electoral region)
- Senedd constituencies and electoral regions
- Wrexham (UK Parliament constituency)
