= Brynteg, Wrexham =

Village in Wales

Coordinates: 53.066°N 3.037°W

Brynteg: Welsh: Bryn-teg
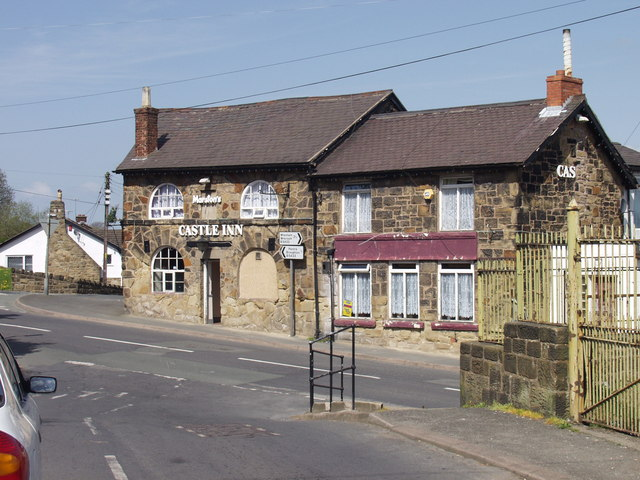
- The Castle Inn public house, Brynteg

- Location within Wrexham
- OS grid reference: SJ305526
- Community: Broughton
- Principal area: Wrexham
- Preserved county: Clwyd
- Country: Wales
- Sovereign state: United Kingdom
- Post town: WREXHAM
- Postcode district: LL11
- Dialling code: 01978
- Police: North Wales
- Fire: North Wales
- Ambulance: Welsh
- UK Parliament: Wrexham
- Senedd Cymru – Welsh Parliament: Wrexham

Brynteg (Welsh: Bryn-teg; Welsh pronunciation) is a village in the community of Broughton, in Wrexham County Borough, Wales.
