= Moss Valley, Wrexham =

Area and country park in Wrexham County Borough, Wales

Coordinates: 53.063°N 3.028°W

Moss Valley: Welsh: Dyffryn Moss
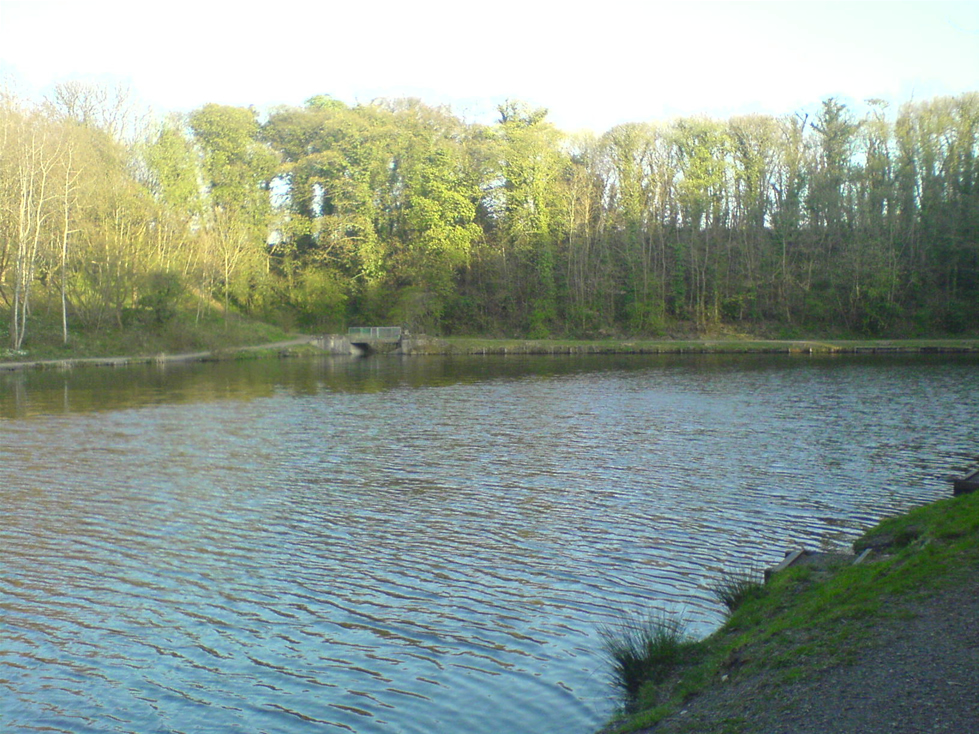
- Fishing Lake

- Location within Wrexham
- OS grid reference: SJ310523
- Community: Broughton
- Principal area: Wrexham
- Country: Wales
- Sovereign state: United Kingdom
- Post town: WREXHAM
- Postcode district: LL11
- Dialling code: 01978
- Police: North Wales
- Fire: North Wales
- Ambulance: Welsh
- UK Parliament: Clwyd South
- Senedd Cymru – Welsh Parliament: Clwyd South

The Moss Valley (Welsh: Dyffryn Moss, pronounced [ˌdəfrɨ̞n ˈmɔs]; Welsh pronunciation) is an area and country park in Wrexham County Borough, Wales. The area, informally known as "The Moss" and The Aggey by local people, has an extensive coal mining history.

== History ==
=== Thomas Telford ===
In 1796, a feeder reservoir lake was constructed in the valley for an extension of the Ellesmere Canal under Thomas Telford. The canal would have eventually served as an extension from Trevor Basin. This plan was abandoned in 1798. Remnants of the canal are still visible in nearby Gwersyllt, and a street in the village is named Heol Camlas (Welsh for Canal Way). Telford's lake is not the lake that is currently present in the valley.

=== Collieries ===
Throughout the 19th Century and early 20th Century, the Moss Valley was the home to the Westminster Colliery in its northern end, and Gatewen Colliery at the southern end. The coal was distributed both locally and nationally through major railway links, much of which was built specifically for the distribution of goods. The colliery's railways were linked to neighbouring Great Western Railway lines. This originally was the Wheatsheaf Branch which ran from the Wheatsheaf Junction of the Chester line, then up a worked incline up Gwersyllt Hill, and then through the 220 ft Summerhill Tunnel to Westminster Colliery. The line then continued through the other side of the valley through the 400 ft Brymbo Tunnel, up a second worked incline to Brymbo Steelworks. The western portal of the Summerhill Tunnel is still visible as of 2008, although its eastern portal and both portals of the Brymbo tunnel have been buried. In 1862 the GWR Ffrwd Branch from the Croesnewydd Junction was opened to transport railway traffic over a much more 'normal' terrain between the Chester line and Brymbo, replacing the Brymbo half of the Wheatsheaf Branch. A Moss Branch was later created from the Ffrwd Branch, making the Wheatsheaf Branch, its brake inclines and two tunnels defunct by 1908. The Great Central Railway Brymbo Branch also ran through the valley, and the Moss Valley station is still visible.

Much of the local working force relied on these collieries for both income and fuel. Westminster Colliery closed in February 1925, but the remnants of the industry were not removed until the early 1970s. It closed mainly due to water leakage, but this was the beginning of a declining industry.

=== Recent history ===
In the early 1970s, the area was reclaimed as a country park by creating two lakes, children's playground, public amenities, a golf club and facilities for fishing.

The area suffered decline by vandalism through the 1990s, however the area was heavily regenerated in the early 2000s, including the cleaning of both lakes, resurfacing of paths, erection of new signs and benches and the creation of a private fishing club. The northern lake was re-themed from a boating lake to a nature reserve, introducing several plant, bird and fish species to the area. In 2006, the original playground was demolished and replaced with a more modern facility, however the former public toilets have remained out of use.

The country park now attracts many visitors including those interested in its industrial history and its wildlife, in addition to members of the Moss Valley Angling Club and the Moss Valley Golf Club.

The country park marks the border between the communities of Gwersyllt and Broughton, whose community councils jointly administer the area.

== Photographs ==
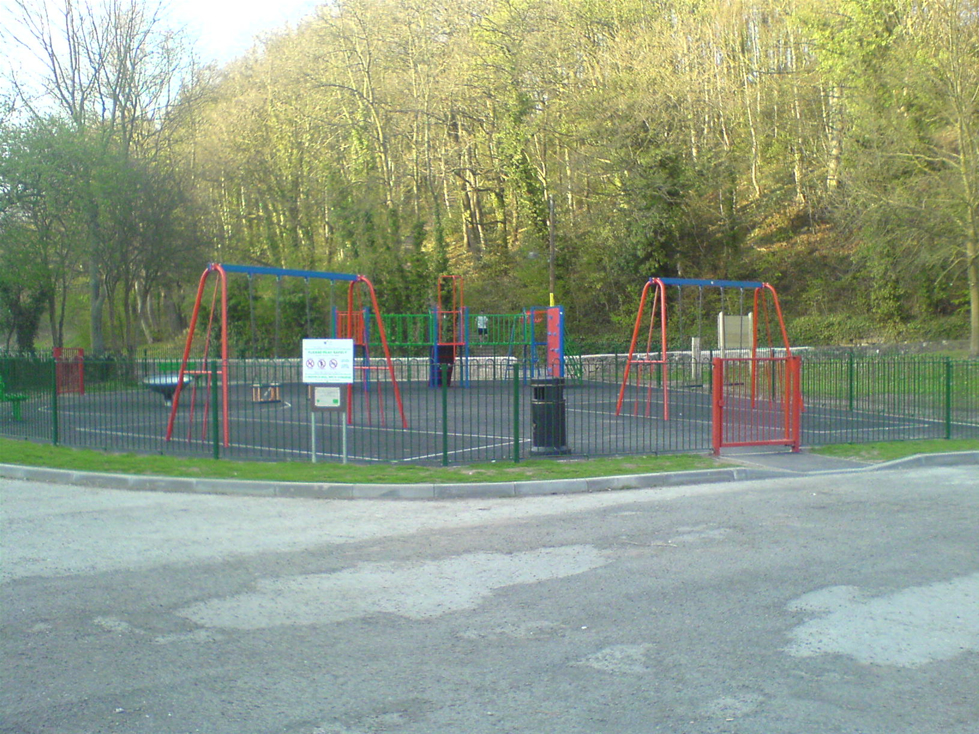
Playground area

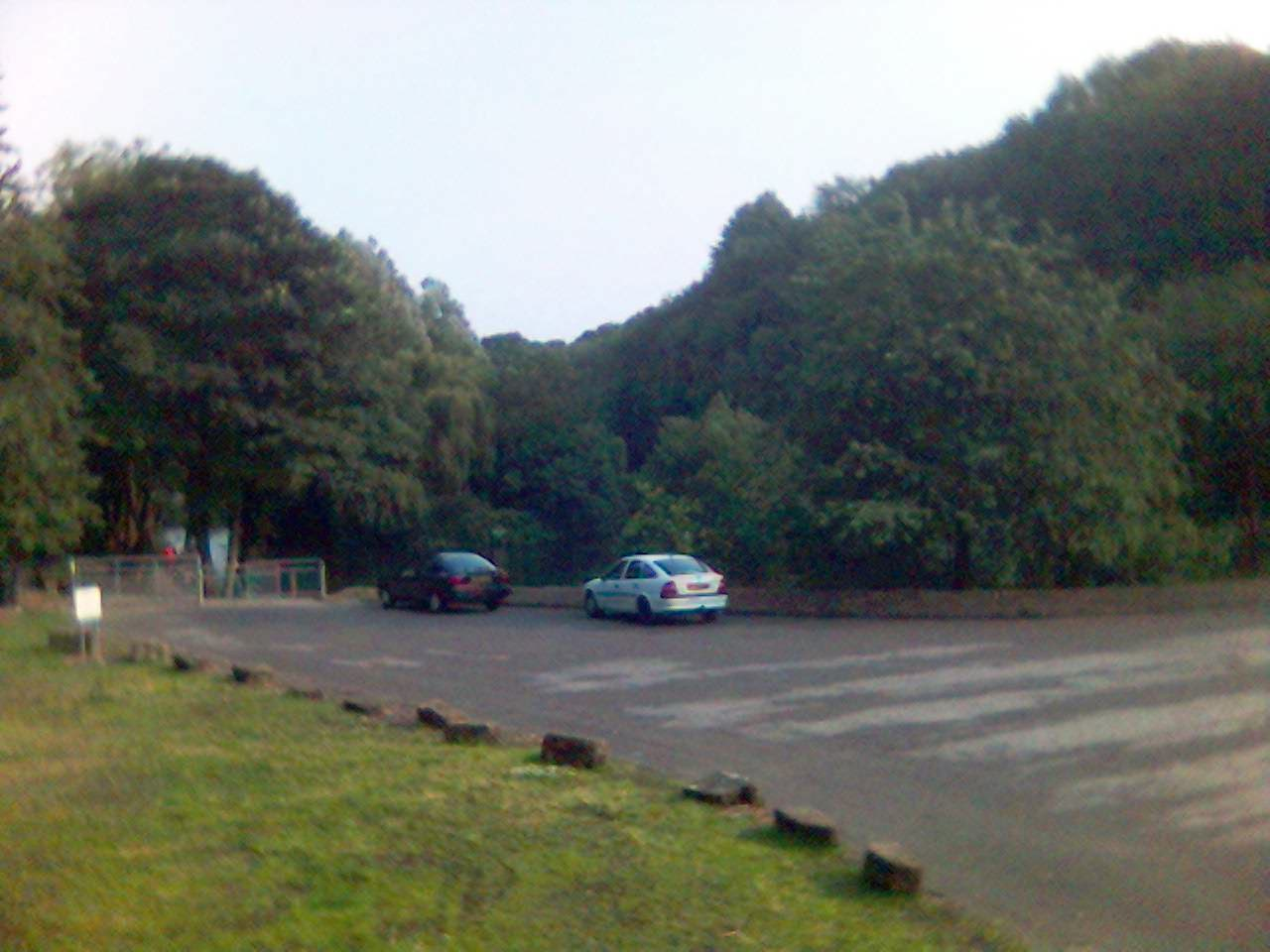
Fishing Lake

Entrance sign to the Moss Valley
