= Russett =

Russett may refer to:

- Bruce Russett (born 1935), Dean Acheson Professor of Political Science and Professor in International and Area Studies, MacMillan Center, Yale University
- Russett, Maryland, unincorporated planned community near Laurel, Maryland in far-western Anne Arundel County
- Russett, Oklahoma, unincorporated community in Johnston County

== See also ==
- Rosset (disambiguation)
- Rossett
- Rousset (disambiguation)
- Russet (disambiguation)
