= Grade II listed buildings in Rossett =

Map of the community in Wrexham County Borough.

In the United Kingdom, the term listed building refers to a building or other structure officially designated as being of special architectural, historical, or cultural significance; Grade II structures are those considered to be "buildings of special interest which justify every effort being made to preserve them". Listing was begun by a provision in the Town and Country Planning Act 1947. Once listed, strict limitations are imposed on the modifications allowed to a building's structure or fittings. In Wales, the authority for listing under the Planning (Listed Buildings and Conservation Areas) Act 1990 rests with Cadw.

This is a list of the 25 Grade II listed buildings in the community of Rossett, in Wrexham County Borough.

Name	Location Grid Ref. (Note: Sometimes known as OSGB36, the grid reference is based on the British national grid reference system used by the Ordnance Survey.) Geo-coordinates	Date Listed	Type/Function	Notes	Reference Number	Image
1 Yew Tree Cottages	Rossett; SJ3528556947; 53.105772°N 2.9681084°W	04 January 1991			1732	–
2 Yew Tree Cottages	Rossett; SJ3528856936; 53.105674°N 2.9680614°W	04 January 1991			17452	–
Ball's Hall	Rossett; SJ3604458053; 53.115805°N 2.9569936°W	07 June 1963	Industrial		1574	–
Burton Hall	Rossett; SJ3500158242; 53.117377°N 2.9726125°W	07 June 1963	Domestic		1573	–
Canister Cottage	Rossett; SJ3702057537; 53.111283°N 2.9423123°W	18 October 1996	Domestic		17455	–
Christ Church	Rossett; SJ3650257183; 53.10804°N 2.9499794°W	18 October 1996	Domestic		17453	–
Cook's Bridge	Rossett; SJ3821856317; 53.100458°N 2.9241828°W	18 October 1996	Religious, Ritual and Funerary		17456	–
Cooksbridge Farmhouse	Rossett; SJ3820456467; 53.101805°N 2.9244208°W	07 June 1963	Religious, Ritual and Funerary		1557	–
Darland Hall	Rossett; SJ3767757831; 53.114003°N 2.932556°W	07 June 1963	Domestic		1554	–
Former Stable-block to NE of Trevalyn Hospital	Rossett; SJ3684456510; 53.102032°N 2.9447388°W	18 October 1996	Agriculture and Subsistence		17467	–
Hem House	Rossett; SJ3879755670; 53.09471°N 2.915413°W	18 October 1996	Commercial		17457	–
Ivy Cottage (formerly known as Ravensbourne Cottages)	Rossett; SJ3561757900; 53.114378°N 2.9633415°W	18 October 1996	Transport		17458	–
Llyndir Hall Hotel	Rossett; SJ3689158056; 53.115933°N 2.9443414°W	18 October 1996	Domestic		17464	–
Lodge Farmhouse	Rossett; SJ3828254219; 53.081609°N 2.9228235°W	07 June 1963	Domestic		1559	–
Lower Honkley Farmhouse	Rossett; SJ3413559297; 53.126753°N 2.9857665°W	18 October 1996	Domestic		17462	–
Meifod	Rossett; SJ3575557082; 53.107043°N 2.9611161°W	18 October 1996			17459	–
Mount Alyn Lodge (including gate piers at drive entrance)	Rossett; SJ3485956854; 53.104885°N 2.9744517°W	18 October 1996	Domestic		17461	–
Outbuilding range immediately E of Yew Tree Farm	Rossett; SJ3529156922; 53.105549°N 2.9680137°W	04 January 1991	Domestic		1733	–
Pergola and gazebo at Darland Hall	Rossett; SJ3772557795; 53.113685°N 2.931832°W	18 October 1996	Domestic		17463	–
Rossett Hall Hotel	Rossett; SJ3683657419; 53.110201°N 2.9450374°W	07 June 1963	Domestic		1556	–
Rossett War Memorial	Rossett; SJ3652557166; 53.10789°N 2.9496325°W	18 October 1996	Industrial		17454	–
The Courtyard (formerly known as Trevalyn Hall Service Wing)	Rossett; SJ3653756788; 53.104494°N 2.9493785°W	18 October 1996	Transport		17465	–
The Stone House	Rossett; SJ3531257008; 53.106324°N 2.9677175°W	18 October 1996	Gardens, Parks and Urban Spaces		17460	–
Trevalyn Farmhouse	Rossett; SJ3821157313; 53.109409°N 2.9244793°W	09 June 1952	Gardens, Parks and Urban Spaces		1529	–
Trevalyn Hospital (formerly known as Trevalyn House)	Rossett; SJ3682456472; 53.101688°N 2.94503°W	18 October 1996	Gardens, Parks and Urban Spaces		17466	–

== See also ==
- Grade II listed buildings in Wrexham County Borough
