= Grousset =

Grousset is a French surname. Notable people with the surname include:

- Maxime Grousset (born 1999), French swimmer
- Paschal Grousset (1844–1909), French politician, journalist, and writer
- René Grousset (1885–1952), French historian

== See also ==
- Rousset (surname)
