= List of public art in Wrexham County Borough =

Map of Wales with Wrexham County Borough highlighted

This is a list of public art in Wrexham County Borough in north-east Wales. The county borough was formed on 1 April 1996. Most of the area was previously part of the district of Wrexham Maelor – with other communities added from Glyndŵr, parts of the eastern half of the historic county of Denbighshire and two parts of historic Flintshire. This list applies only to works of public art on permanent display in an outdoor public space and does not, for example, include artworks in museums.

== Bangor-on-Dee ==
Image	Title / subject	Location and coordinates	Date	Artist / designer	Type	Material	Dimensions	Designation	Wikidata	Notes
More images	War memorial	Near St Dunawd's Church, Bangor-on-Dee	1925	Herbert Tyson Smith	Pillar with sculpture	Red sandstone		Grade II		

== Bronington ==
Image	Title / subject	Location and coordinates	Date	Artist / designer	Type	Material	Dimensions	Designation	Wikidata	Notes
	War memorial	Holy Trinity Church, Bronington	c. 1920		Octagonal Celtic cross	Stone	4.0m high	Grade II	Q29507079	

== Bwlchgwyn ==
Image	Title / subject	Location and coordinates	Date	Artist / designer	Type	Material	Dimensions	Designation	Wikidata	Notes
	War memorial	Junction of Glascoed Rd. and Ruthin Rd., Bwlchgwyn			Cross on pedestal	Granite	4.0m high			

== Chirk ==
Image	Title / subject	Location and coordinates	Date	Artist / designer	Type	Material	Dimensions	Designation	Wikidata	Notes
	John Darlington memorial	St Mary's Parish Church, Chirk			Enclosed cross on pillar & stepped base	Stone		Grade I		
More images	War memorial	Junction of Station Avenue and Church St., Chirk	1920	Eric Gill	Obelisk with relief	Stone	4.5m tall	Grade II*	Q17744506	

== Coedpoeth ==
Image	Title / subject	Location and coordinates	Date	Artist / designer	Type	Material	Dimensions	Designation	Wikidata	Notes
	War memorial	Park Rd., Coedpoeth	c. 1920		Statue on pedestal	Granite			Q29494132	

== Froncysyllte ==
Image	Title / subject	Location and coordinates	Date	Artist / designer	Type	Material	Dimensions	Designation	Wikidata	Notes
	Boer war memorial	Beside St David's Church, Froncysyllte	1909	Joseph Hall (designer) & J. C. Edwards (builder)	Fountain	Stone & terracotta	2.5m high	Grade II	Q29497329	
	War memorial	Churchyard of St David's, Froncysyllte	c. 1920		Cross on stepped plinth	Stone				

== Gwersyllt ==
Image	Title / subject	Location and coordinates	Date	Artist / designer	Type	Material	Dimensions	Designation	Wikidata	Notes
More images	War memorial	Corner of Wheatsheaf Lane & Old Mold Road, Gwersyllt	1923	Joseph Hermon Cawthra	Obelisk-mounted statue	Bronze and stone		Grade II	Q29494213	

== Hanmer ==
Image	Title / subject	Location and coordinates	Date	Artist / designer	Type	Material	Dimensions	Designation	Wikidata	Notes
	Medieval cross	St Chads Church, Hanmer			Cross on plinth	Stone		Grade II*	Q13127394	Repositioned 1739
	War memorial	St Chads Church, Hanmer	1919	Giles Gilbert Scott	Calvary on column	Stone		Grade II*	Q17744535	

== Holt ==
Image	Title / subject	Location and coordinates	Date	Artist / designer	Type	Material	Dimensions	Designation	Wikidata	Notes
	War memorial	The Old Market Place, Holt	1920	Mansley of Chester, (Mason)	Obelisk on pedestal	Sandstone		Grade II	Q29494583	

== Overton-on-Dee ==
Image	Title / subject	Location and coordinates	Date	Artist / designer	Type	Material	Dimensions	Designation	Wikidata	Notes
	War memorial	High St., Overton-on-Dee	1921-22		Cenotaph	Red sandstone with bronze plaques		Grade II	Q29492260	

== Rossett ==
Image	Title / subject	Location and coordinates	Date	Artist / designer	Type	Material	Dimensions	Designation	Wikidata	Notes
	Baptismal font	Christ Church, Chester Road, Rossett			Octagonal font	Stone		Grade II		
	Cross on pedestal	Christ Church, Chester Road, Rossett			Cross on pedestal	Stone		Grade II		
	Gravestone	Christ Church, Chester Road, Rossett			Celtic wheel cross	Stone		Grade II		
	War memorial	Christ Church, Chester Road, Rossett			Cross on column	Stone with bronze plaques		Grade II		

== Ruabon ==
Image	Title / subject	Location and coordinates	Date	Artist / designer	Type	Material	Dimensions	Designation	Wikidata	Notes
	War memorial	St. Mary's Church, Ruabon			Obelisk	Stone				Obelisk relocated from Westcliff-on-Sea

== Tallarn Green ==
Image	Title / subject	Location and coordinates	Date	Artist / designer	Type	Material	Dimensions	Designation	Wikidata	Notes
	War memorial	Near St Peter's Chapel, Tallarn Green			Celtic cross	Stone	5.0m high			

== Wrexham ==
Image	Title / subject	Location and coordinates	Date	Artist / designer	Type	Material	Dimensions	Designation	Wikidata	Notes
More images	Queen Victoria	Bellevue Park, Wrexham	1904	Henry Price (c. 1872–1922)	Sculpture on pedestal	Bronze and stone		Grade II	Q29482042	
More images	Royal Welch Fusiliers memorial	Junction of Bodhfryd Rd. & Chester Rd., Wrexham	1924	Goscombe John	Sculpture group on pedestal	Bronze and stone		Grade II	Q29481992	
More images	The Arc	Wrexham	1995	David Annand	Sculpture group	Bronze and steel				
More images	Four Dogs gate	Chester Road, Acton			Gates with sculptures					
More images	Gorsedd stones	Acton Park								
	Memorial	Rhosddu Road Graveyard, Rhosddu			Obelisk	Stone				
