= Archibald John Davies =

British stained glass artist (1877–1953)

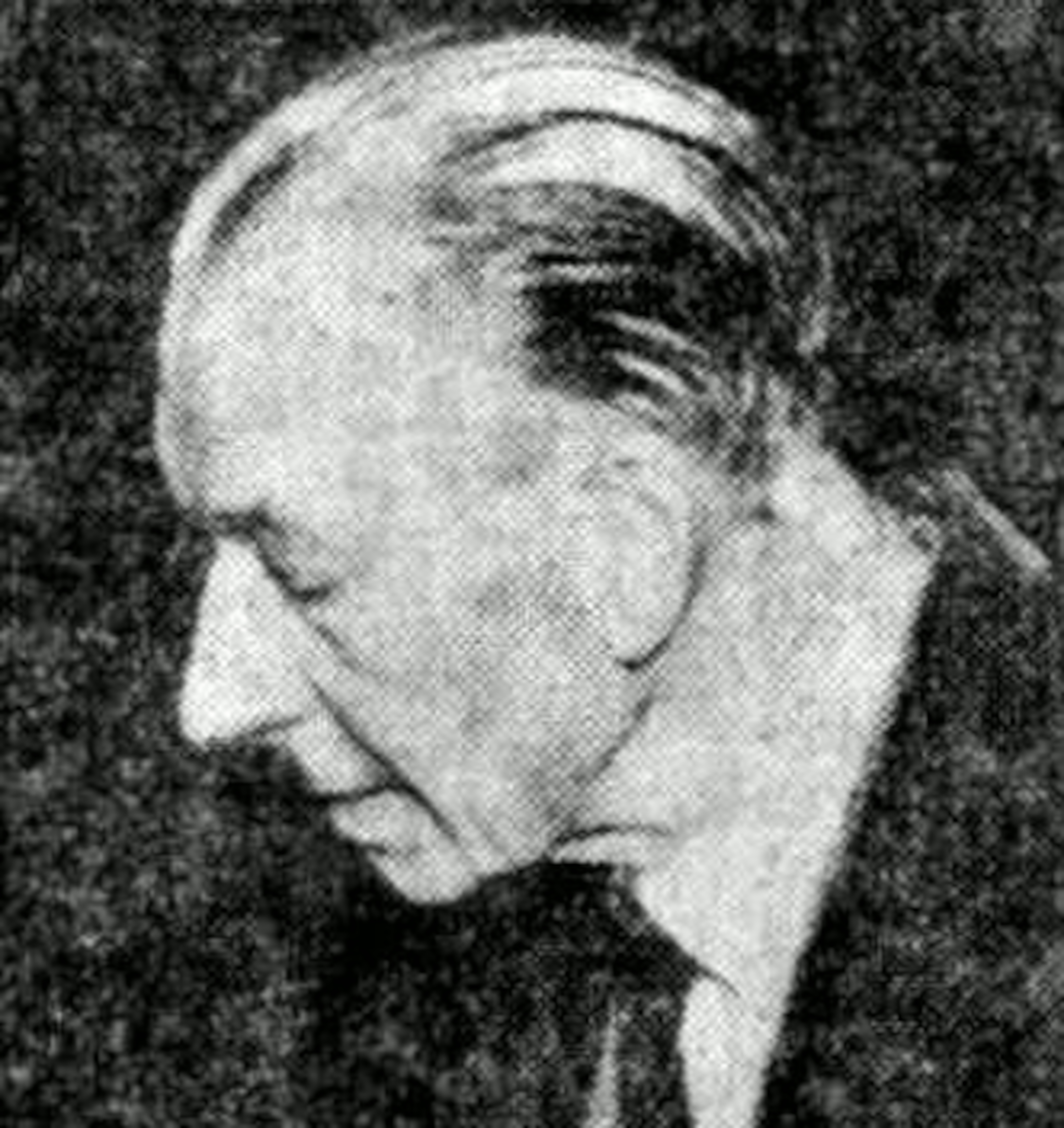
- Born: 27 June 1877; Islington, London, United Kingdom
- Died: 18 June 1953 (aged 75); Bromsgrove, Worcestershire, United Kingdom
- Education: Birmingham School of Art
- Known for: Stained glass
- Movement: Arts & Crafts
- Elected: British Society of Master Glass Painters

Archibald John Davies (27 June 1877 – 18 June 1953), sometimes known professionally as A. J. Davies, was an English stained glass artist associated with the Arts and Crafts movement. He is noted for establishing the long-running glass studio at the Bromsgrove Guild of Applied Arts in Worcestershire, which produced more than 300 windows under his leadership, primarily ecclesiastical commissions for church buildings in the UK and overseas.

== Early life and education ==
Davies was born in Islington, London, on 27 June 1877, the third of eight children of John Davies, a drysalter clerk from Uttoxeter in Staffordshire, and Jane Davies from Colton, also in Staffordshire. In 1884, the family moved to Moseley in Birmingham. Census records indicate that by 1891 the household included six children and two live-in female servants.

Davies passed the admission examination for the King Edward VI Camp Hill School for Boys in July 1887, beginning his education there at the age of ten. At school he excelled in sports and drawing, with art instruction provided by visiting masters.

=== Birmingham Municipal Central School of Art and Crafts ===
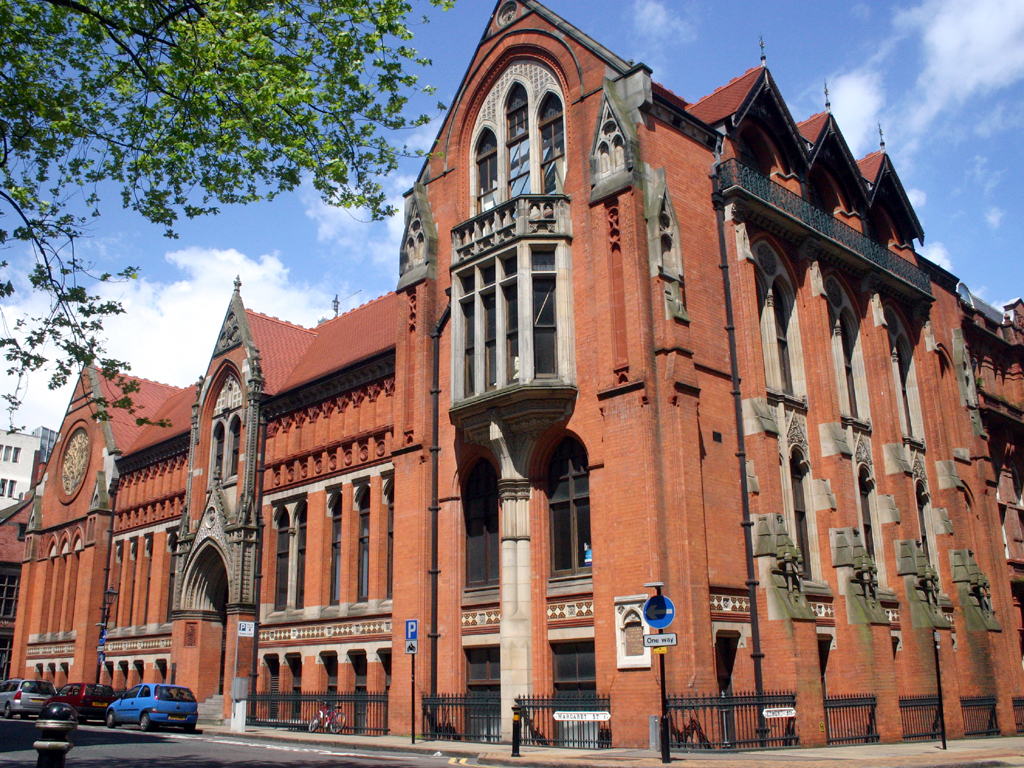
Birmingham School of Art building

In 1893, aged sixteen, Davies enrolled at the Birmingham Municipal Central School of Art and Crafts where he studied under Henry Payne; Payne had a lasting influence on Davies' work. The school was a hub of the Arts and Crafts movement and, through Payne, it maintained strong connections with other leading figures such as William Morris and Edward Burne-Jones. As a result, students were regularly exposed to local examples of Pre-Raphaelite paintings and stained glass, including the growing collection at Birmingham Museum and Art Gallery, and the Burne-Jones designed Morris & Co. windows then in the process of being installed at St Philip's Church (which in 1905 was elevated to cathedral status with the creation of the Diocese of Birmingham). The school also allowed its students to develop their practical skills and ran craft workshops called "Art Laboratories" where they could execute their own designs, including in glass.

Davies was highly successful at the school, receiving prizes in student exhibitions, including a special prize in 1898 for three pencil and ink studies and an oil painting. He progressed to stained glass design under Payne and qualified as an art teacher, subsequently holding positions at Grace Road and Conway Road Branch Schools.

== Career ==
=== Early studio work ===
Alongside his teaching, in 1904, Davies established his own glass studio, probably based at his family home in Moseley. Early production was likely fired by established Birmingham glassmakers such as Crew and Commander, since kilns were expensive to own and operate.

=== Bromsgrove Guild of Applied Arts ===
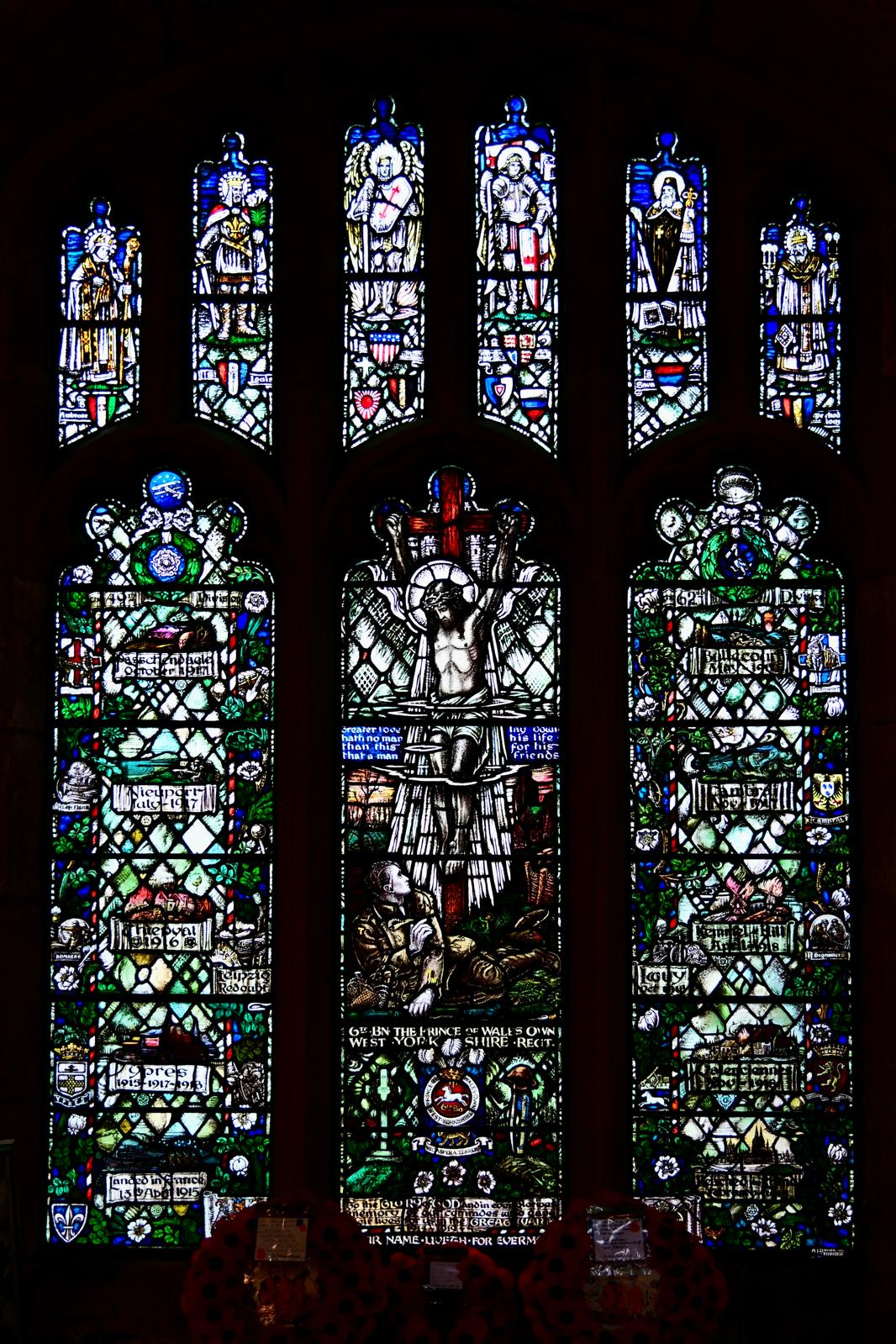
Bradford Cathedral, West Yorkshire: War memorial window to members of the 6th Battalion The Prince of Wales' Own West Yorkshire Regiment killed in action during the First World War, 1921.

In 1906, Davies received an invitation from Walter Gilbert, who had founded the Bromsgrove Guild of Applied Arts in 1898, to set up a stained-glass studio within the Guild's premises. On accepting the offer Davies moved to Bromsgrove and, in 1907, resigned his teaching positions due to the growing demands of his stained glass business. In Bromsgrove, Davies married Winifred Alice Bate on 28 July 1909; the couple had one daughter, Barbara, born 27 July 1911.

At Bromsgrove, Davies ran a studio designing and producing stained glass commissioned primarily for ecclesiastical settings and occasionally for secular ones. Under Davies' 47-year tenure, the studio produced over 240 windows for locations in Great Britain and more than 100 more for international locations, particularly for churches in Canada and South Africa. Most windows were privately commissioned memorials for churches, usually involving the reglazing of an existing window in a pre-existing building. Only two new churches were fully furnished with his windows: Holy Trinity and St. Mary Church in Dodford, Worcestershire, which opened in 1908, and the Ebenezer Methodist Chapel in Sidemoor, Worcestershire, which opened in 1933. About one-third of Davies' windows are signed, usually in the bottom right-hand corner. He was a Fellow of the British Society of Master Glass Painters.

At Bromsgrove, Davies also led production of the decorative domes for first-class areas of the passenger liner Orvieto, built for the Orient Steam Navigation Company between 1908 and 1911. Davies also provided designs for other items that the Guild specialised in manufacturing, including painted wooden panels, and smaller items such as churchwardens' staves.

== Later life and death ==
In 1926, Davies purchased land in Bromsgrove and built a house for his family. He lived there until his death on 18 June 1953, shortly before his seventy-sixth birthday. Before he died, he was completing a window for All Saints Cathedral in Halifax, Nova Scotia. After continual operation for forty-seven years, the stained glass studio at the Bromsgrove Guild closed upon Davies' death.

The archive of Davies' studio is held in collection of the Worcestershire County Museum as part of the larger archive of the Bromsgrove Guild itself. The museum has also independently acquired several of Davies' works in glass. The museum collections of Warwick and Hartlebury, and of Birmingham Museum and Art Gallery, possibly include the nine glass panels depicting Shakespearean scenes designed by Davies in 1923. These were rescued in 1967 at the behest of Davies' daughter Barbara Morrison when the West End Cinema, Birmingham, was demolished.

On 7 April 1968, a stained glass window commemorating Davies' work, and the work of all members of the Bromsgrove Guild of Applied Arts, was unveiled in Bromsgrove Congregational Church, in Bromsgrove. It was unveiled by Warwickshire's cricket captain, Alan Smith. It was donated by Davies' daughter Barbara Morrison and her husband. In 1966 the Hartlebury museum exhibited three small stained glass items by Davies, as "the forerunner of a bigger exhibition" of his work.

== Themes and style ==
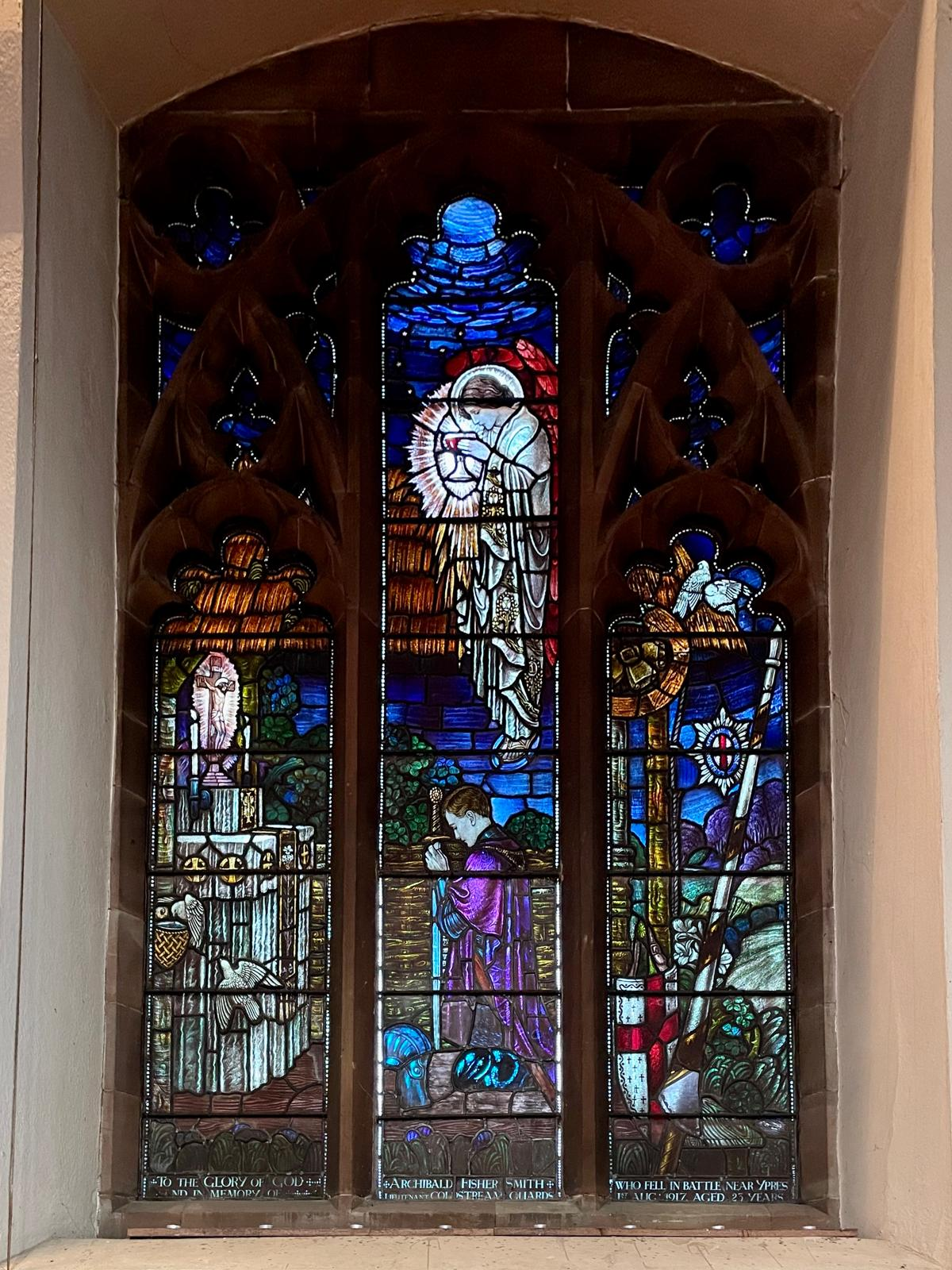
St Peter's Collegiate Church, Wolverhampton, West Midlands: Sir Galahad before the image of Christ, c.1920.

Davies’s work is characterized by Arts and Crafts influences, his early work specifically influenced by Henry Payne - who taught Davies at the Birmingham Municipal School of Art - as well as important figures in the movement such as Edward Burne-Jones. Davies' richly detailed figurative designs are noted for their robust painting and carefully chosen glass colours. In dialogue with older contemporaries such as Christopher Whall, Davies' work demonstrates the continuation of Arts and Crafts principles into the interwar period, combining traditional craftsmanship with innovative design and familiar religious iconography. Many of Davies' commissions were intended as collective or individual war memorials, commissioned in the aftermath of the First World War. For these he developed a repeated but individually distinctive motif based on the legend of Sir Galahad before the image of Christ.

== Notable works ==
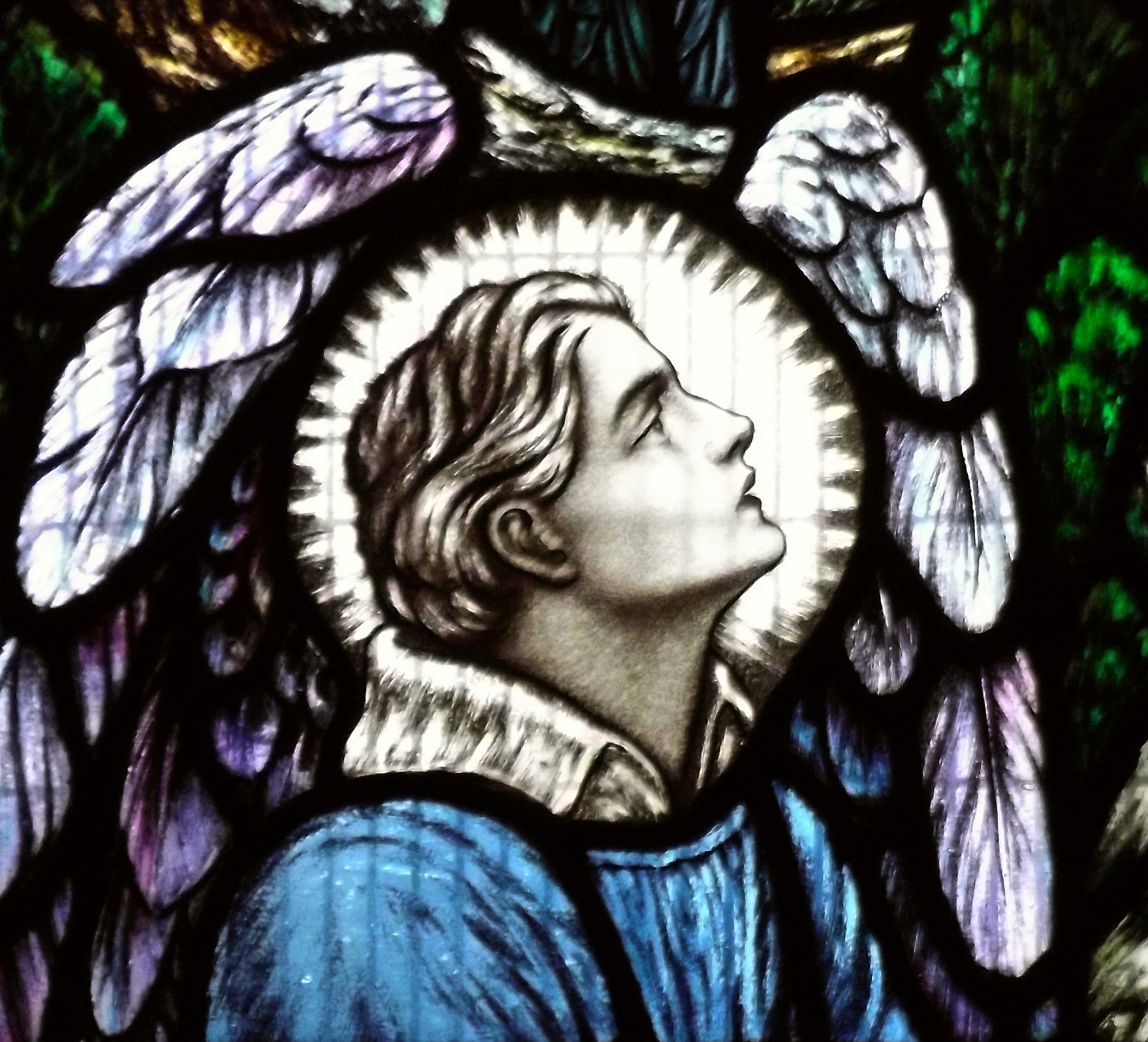
Angel, by Davies (at St Matthew, Bankfoot, Bradford)

Stained glass windows from the Bromsgrove Studio, the majority of which were designed and executed by Davies himself, can be found in many British churches and cathedrals, particularly across the English midlands, as well as at international locations. The following is a non-exhaustive list of works that remain in situ.

- Holy Trinity Church, Southport, Merseyside – Four two-light memorial windows in Lady Chapel, Crucifixion, God so Loved the World, Sir Galahad (1912-1917).
- St Peter's Collegiate Church, Wolverhampton, West Midlands – Sarah Eliza Brevett memorial window, Christian charity (c.1913); Archibald Fisher Smith memorial window, Sir Galahad before the image of Christ (c.1920).
- St Ethelbert's Church, Slough, Berkshire – Two windows in the north aisle (1917).
- Church of St Mary, Rhuddlan, Denbighshire - Geoffrey Seymour Rowley memorial window, Sir Galahad before the image of Christ (1919).
- Church of St John Baptist, Stock & Bradley Green, Worcestershire – First World War memorial rose window, regimental cap badges (1920).
- Church of St Mael and St Sulien, Corwen, Denbighshire – Jane Mary Lloyd John memorial window, Christ and Mary Magdalene (c.1920).
- All Saints Church, Thurlestone, Devon – Five windows in chancel, nave and Lady Chapel; Epiphany, Vision of Heaven, Flight into Egypt, Sir Galahad before the image of Christ, St Christopher bearing the Christ Child (c.1920-1935).
- Bradford Cathedral, West Yorkshire – First World War memorial window to the 6th Battalion, The Prince of Wales' Own West Yorkshire Regiment, Crucifixion scene with soldier (1921).
- Church of St Paul, Burton upon Trent, Staffordshire – Memorial window to Philip Lloyd Stockley, Sir Galahad before the image of Christ (1921); memorial window to Agnes Miers, Good Shepherd (1936).
- Church of St Thomas, Toronto, Ontario] - Thomas Brehaut Saunders memorial window, St Joan of Arc with Angel (1922).
- St Cuthbert's Church, Sheffield, South Yorkshire – war memorial window (1922).
- Hereford Cathedral, Herefordshire – Two windows in Stanbury Chapel, showing scenes from the life of Bishop John Stanbury (1923).
- Church of St John the Baptist, Lissington, Lincolnshire – William Seagrave memorial window, the Last Supper (c.1923).
- Church of St John the Baptist, Aston Ingham, Herefordshire – The Whatley window (1923).
- Church of St Margaret, Mountain Ash, Rhondda Cynon Taff - Gwilym Jones memorial window, Christ and Mary Magdalene (c.1924); M. Morgan memorial window, Sir Galahad before the image of Christ (c.1930).
- Church of St Peter and St Paul, Deddington, Oxfordshire – Emily May Jones Memorial Window, Assumption of the Virgin (1924); Muriel Vane Jones Memorial Window, Christ among the Children (1937).
- Christ Church, Rossett, Wrexham - Parish First World War memorial, three soldiers of the Welch Regiment (1925).
- Church of St Andrew, Aylestone, Leicestershire – Ellis-Beasley memorial window, Presentation of Christ at the Temple (c.1925).
- Church of St John the Baptist, Bromsgrove − Window commemorating Dr Browne, and depicting Christ as the great physician (1925).
- Church of All Saints, Mappleton, East Riding of Yorkshire – Memorial east window depicting the Crucifixion scene, dedicated to Augusta Wheen who died in 1916. (1926).
- Church of St Mary de Wyche, Wychbold, Worcestershire – Richard Holmden Amphlett memorial window, Virgin and Child with St Richard de Wyche (1927).
- Church of St Margaret, St Margarets, Herefordshire - East chancel window, St Margaret and the path to the Heavenly City (c.1930).
- Church of St Mary of the Assumption, Market Lavington, Wiltshire – East window, Assumption of the Virgin (1931).
- Worcester Cathedral, Worcestershire – Five of fifteen windows in the west cloister showing history of Worcester (1933-1950).
- All Saints Church, Claverley, Shropshire – Laura Orme memorial window, Virgin and Child with Angels (1934); South aisle window, Christ Child (1936).
- Church of St John the Baptist, Glastonbury, Somerset – Joseph and Elizabeth Bishop memorial window, saints and legends of Glastonbury (1936).
- St Andrew's Church, Cransley, Northamptonshire – Memorial window showing Winston Churchill (and cigar) with Theodore Roosevelt aboard a battleship. Presented by US troops who were stationed locally (1944).
- Church of the Ascension, Hall Green, Birmingham - Three-light window depicting Christ and the dove of peace; one of at least four windows by Davies. (1946).
- St Michael and All Angels, Claverdon, Warwickshire – Window dedicated to Lottie Matilda Alexander, and depicting Faith and Charity. (1948).
- Church of St Peter ad Vincula, Combe Martin, North Devon - Three-panel window illustrating the calling of St Andrew and St Peter (1950).
- Church of St Matthew, Bankfoot, Bradford, West Yorkshire - Walter Mather memorial window, Suffer the Little Children to come unto Me (c.1950); Owrid Tordoff memorial window, the Risen Christ (c.1950). (Note: The St Matthew Bankfoot window - Risen Christ - is signed by Davies on bottom RH corner)

== Gallery ==
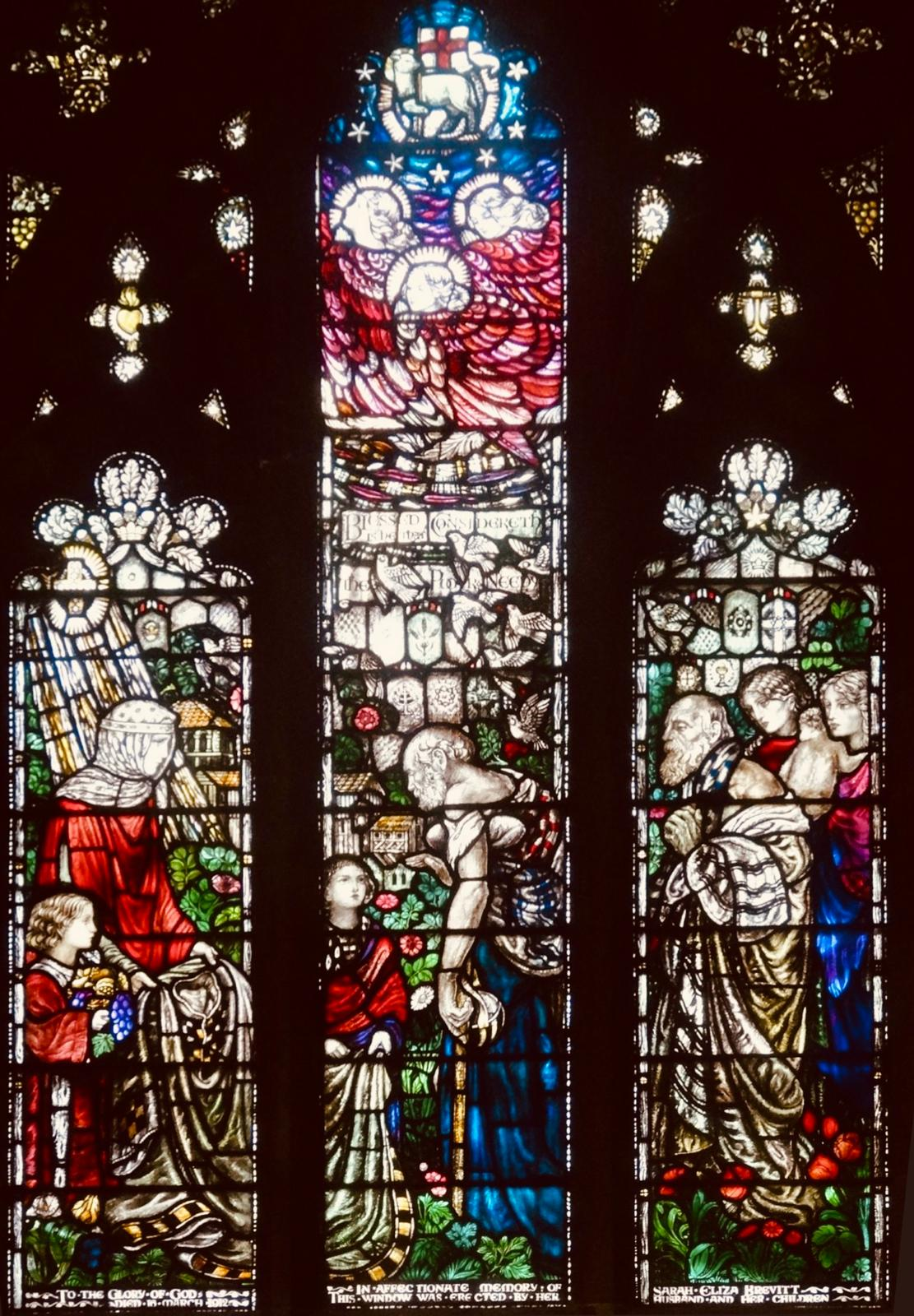
St Peter's Collegiate Church, Wolverhampton, West Midlands - The Act of Christian Charity, c.1913.

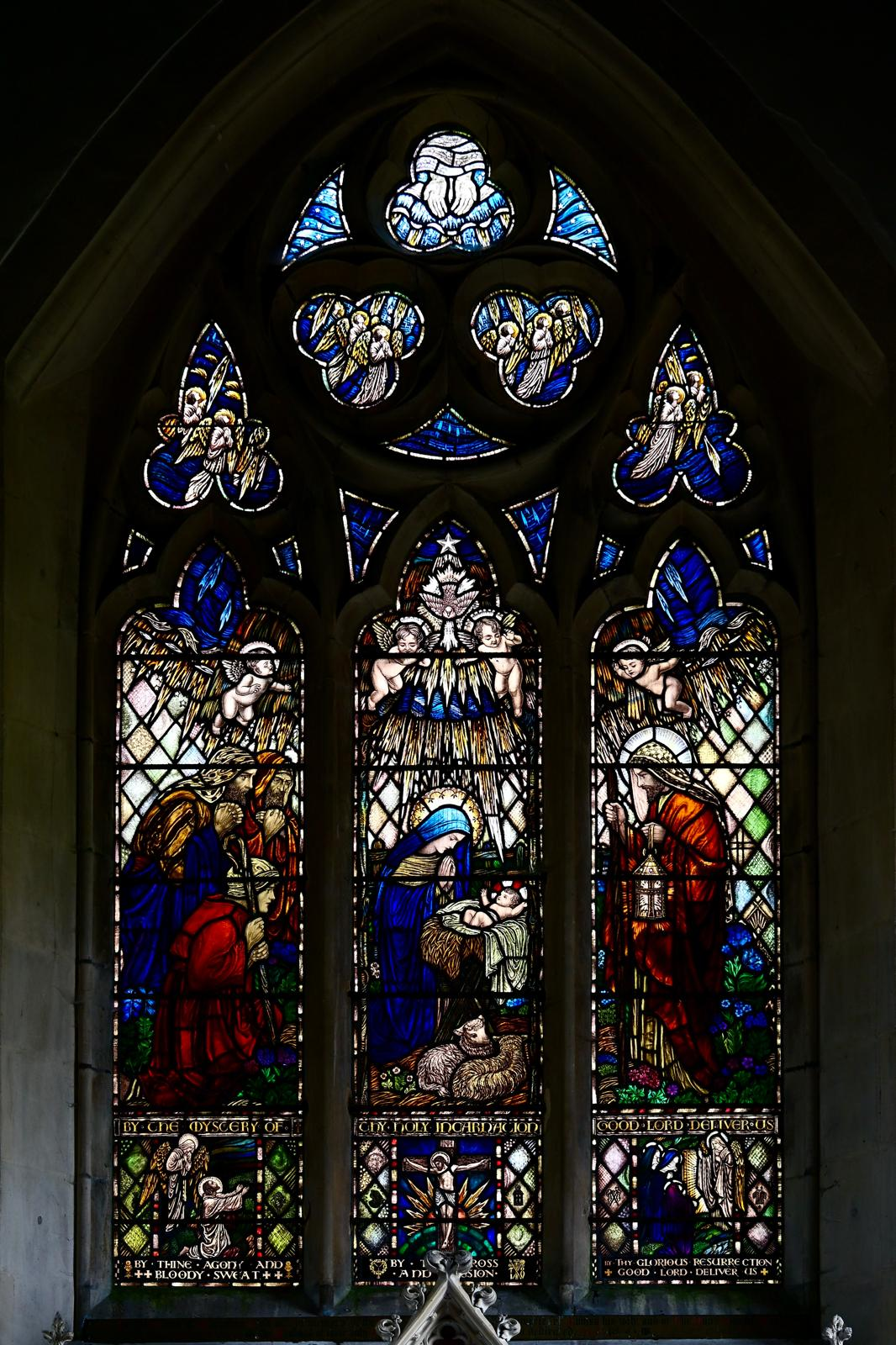
Church of St Mary of the Assumption, Market Lavington, Wiltshire - The Assumption of the Virgin, c.1920.

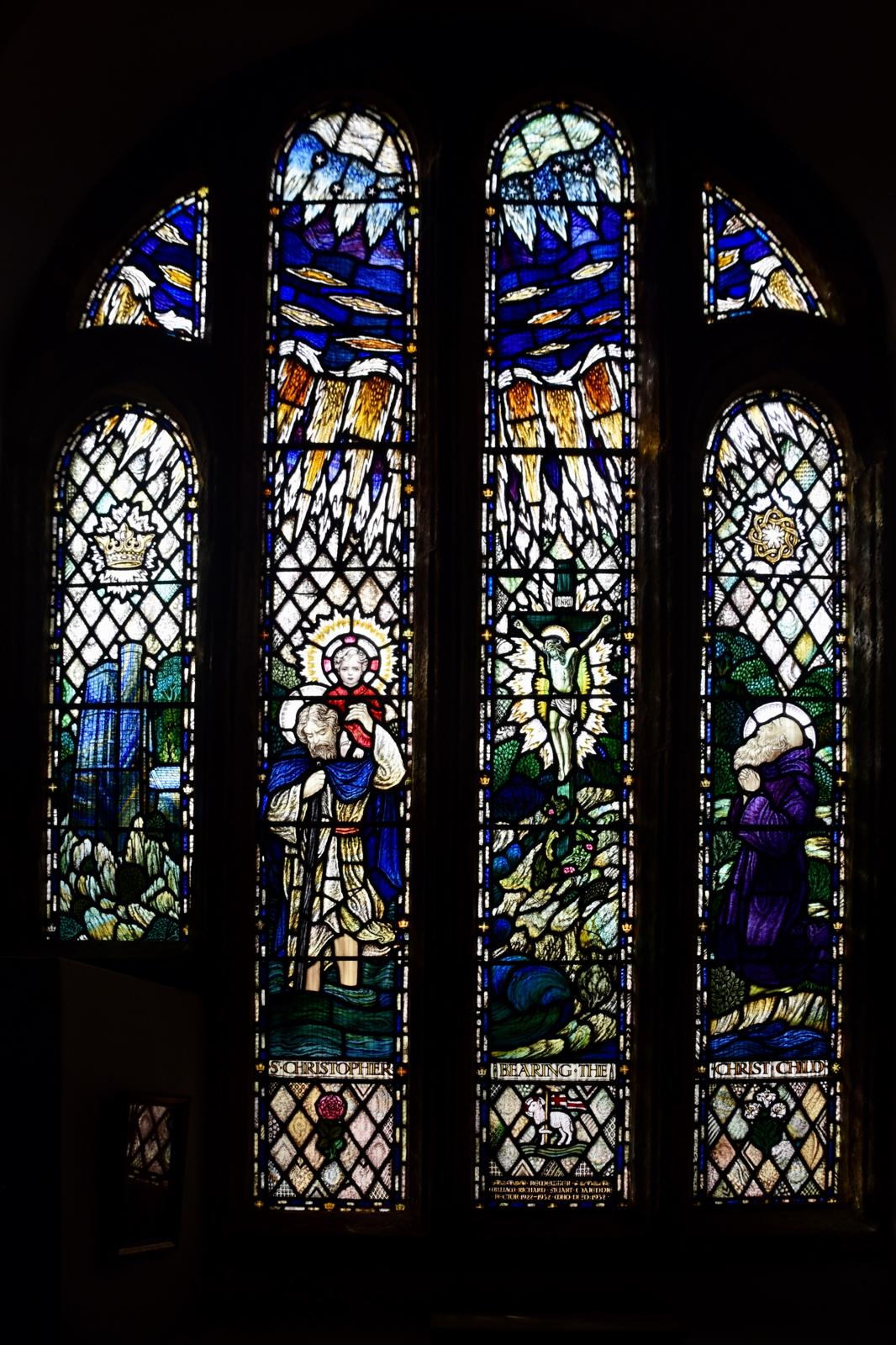
Church of All Saints, Thurlestone, Devon - St Christopher bearing the Christ Child, c.1920.

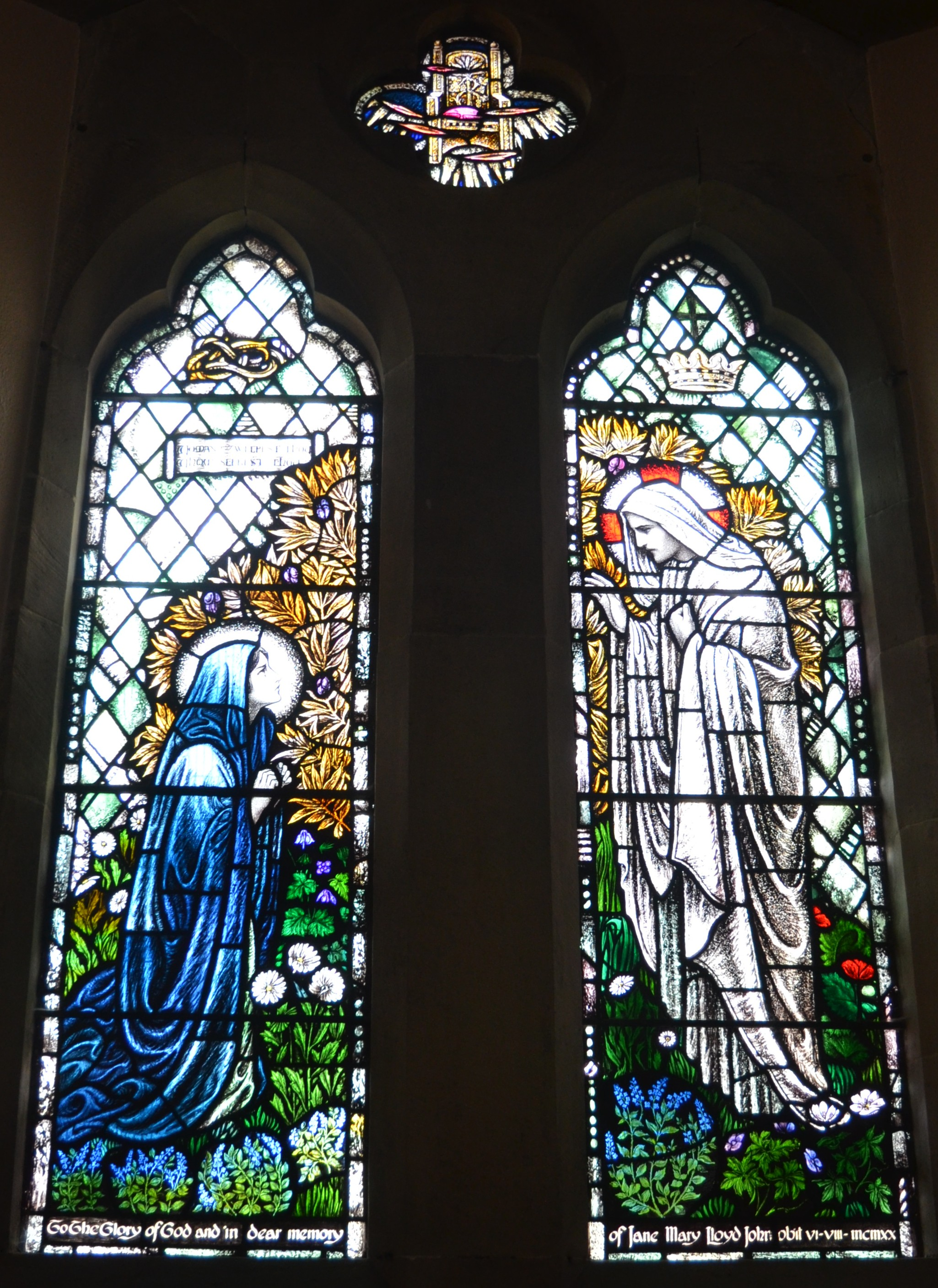
Church of St Mael and St Sulien, Corwen, Denbighshire – Christ and Mary Magdalene, c.1920.

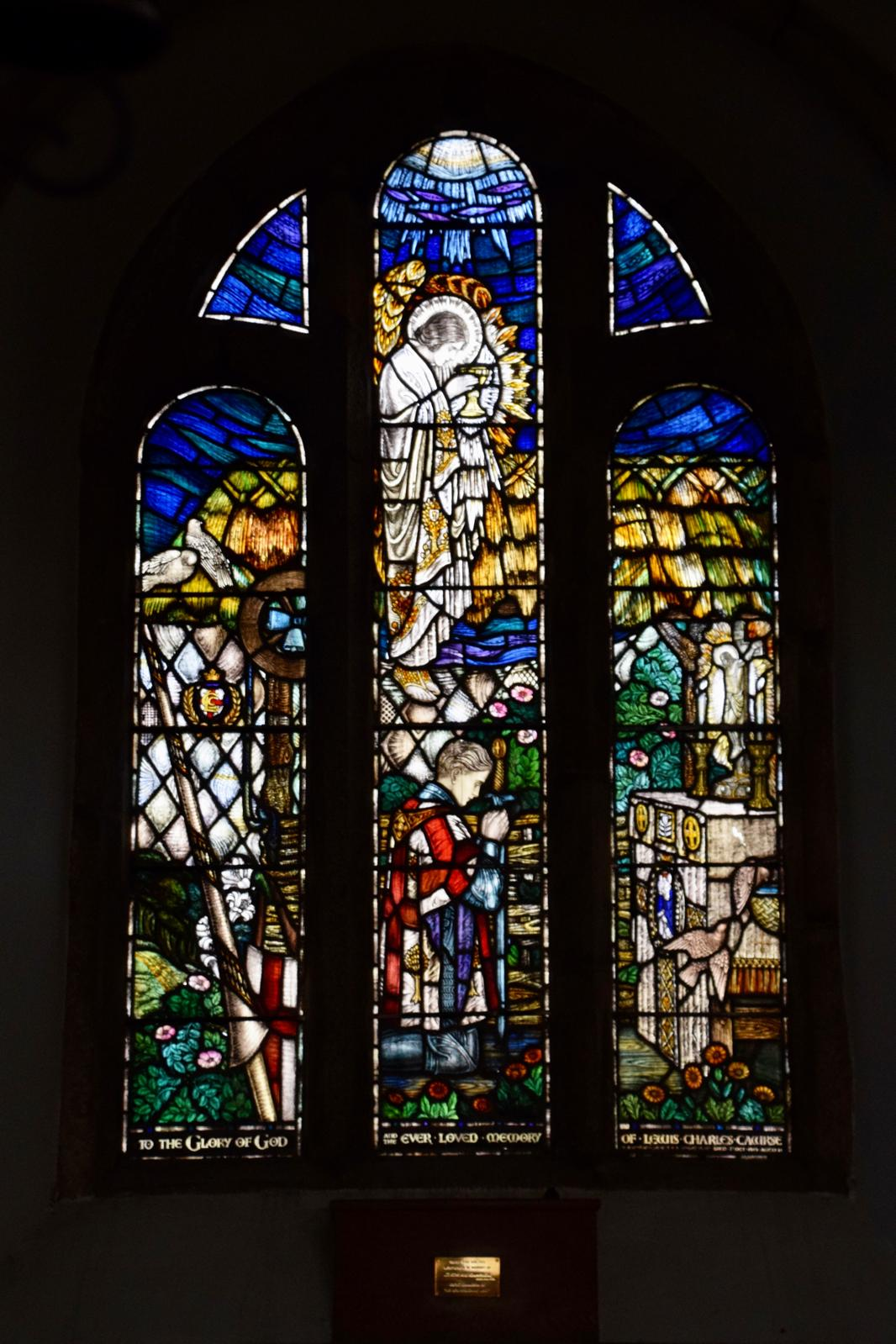
Church of All Saints, Thurlestone, Devon - Sir Galahad before the image of Christ, c.1921.

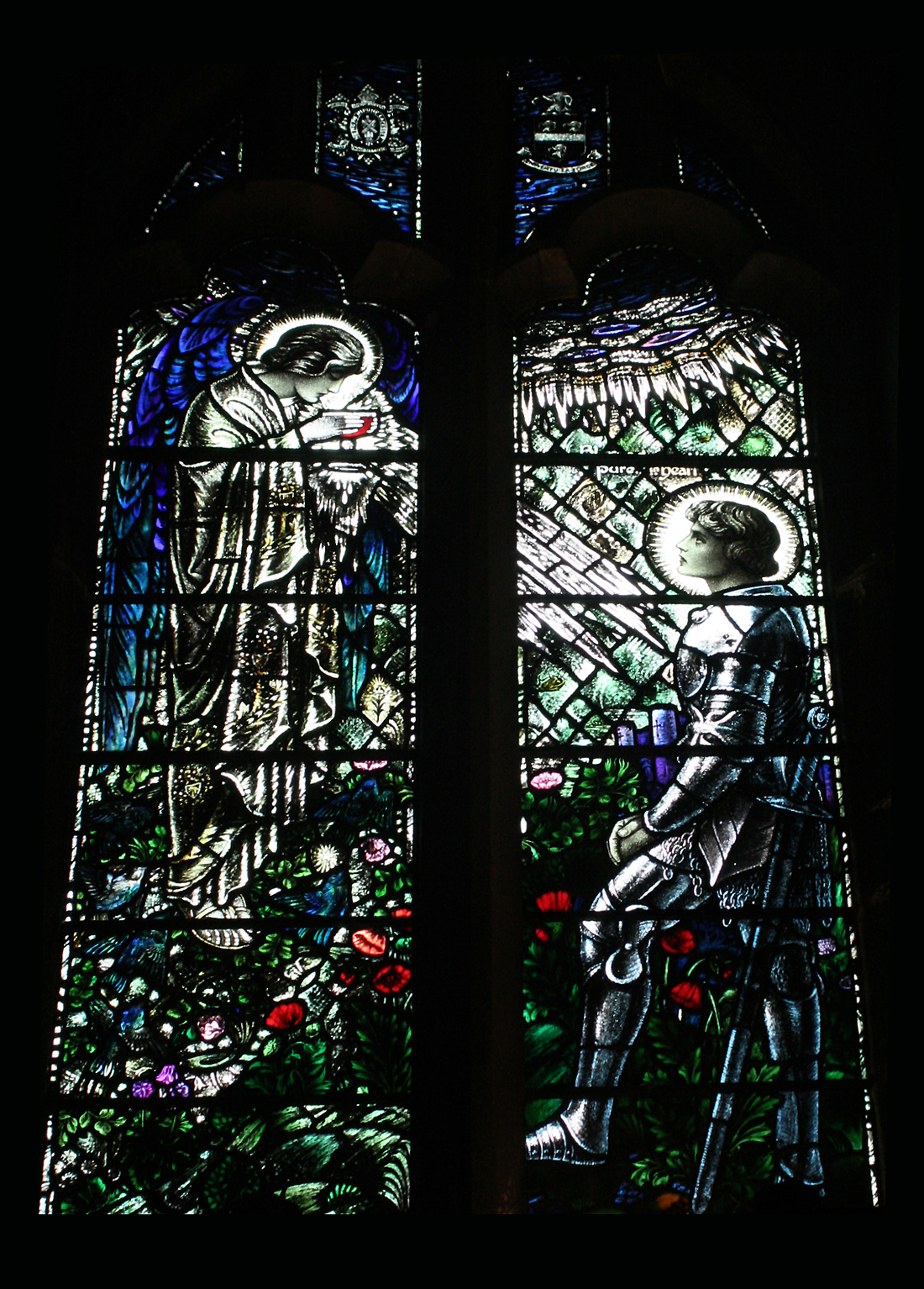
Church of St Thomas, Toronto, Ontario - Saint Joan of Arc with Angel, 1922.

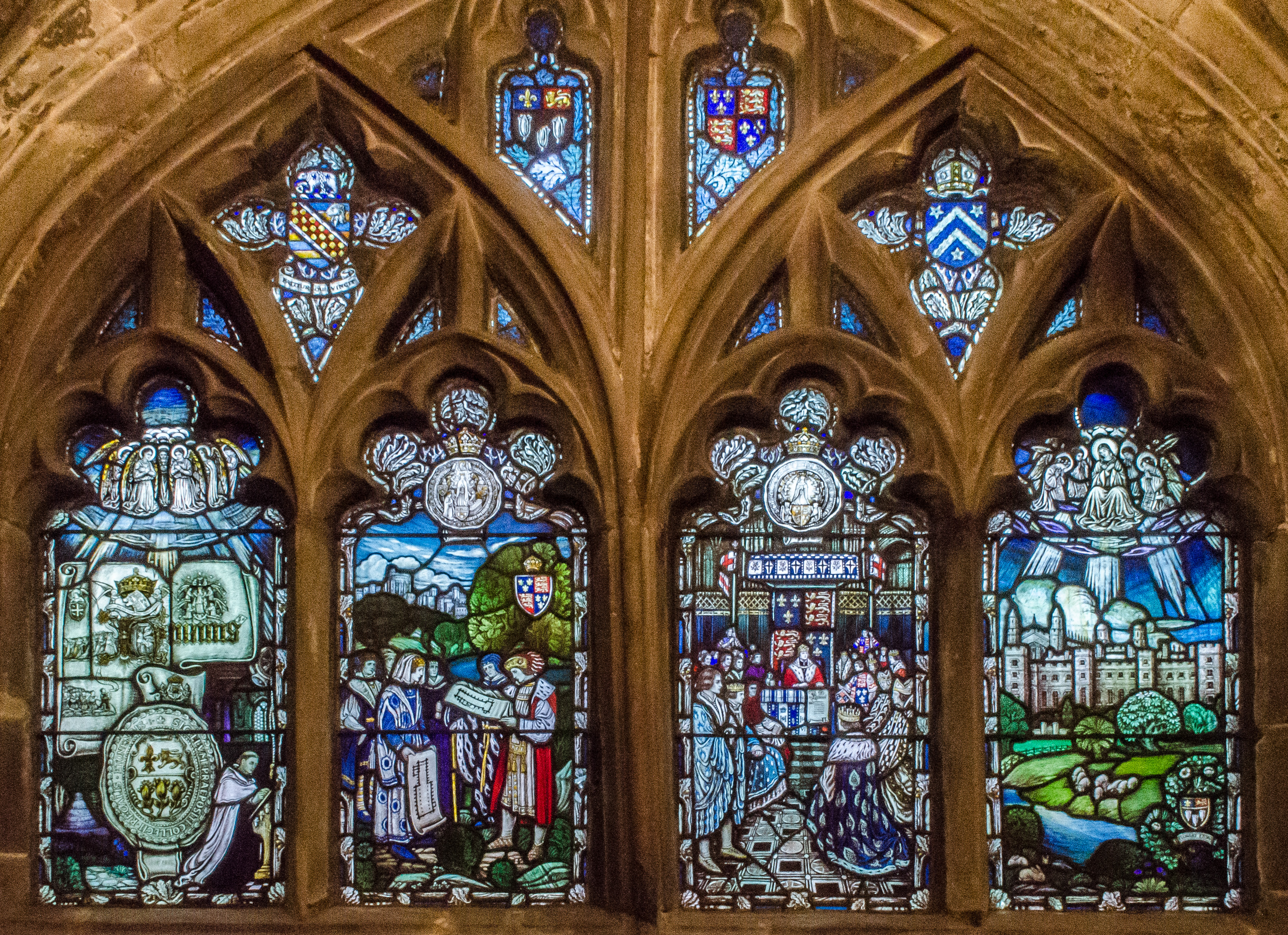
Hereford Cathedral, Herefordshire - Stanbury Chapel, 1923.

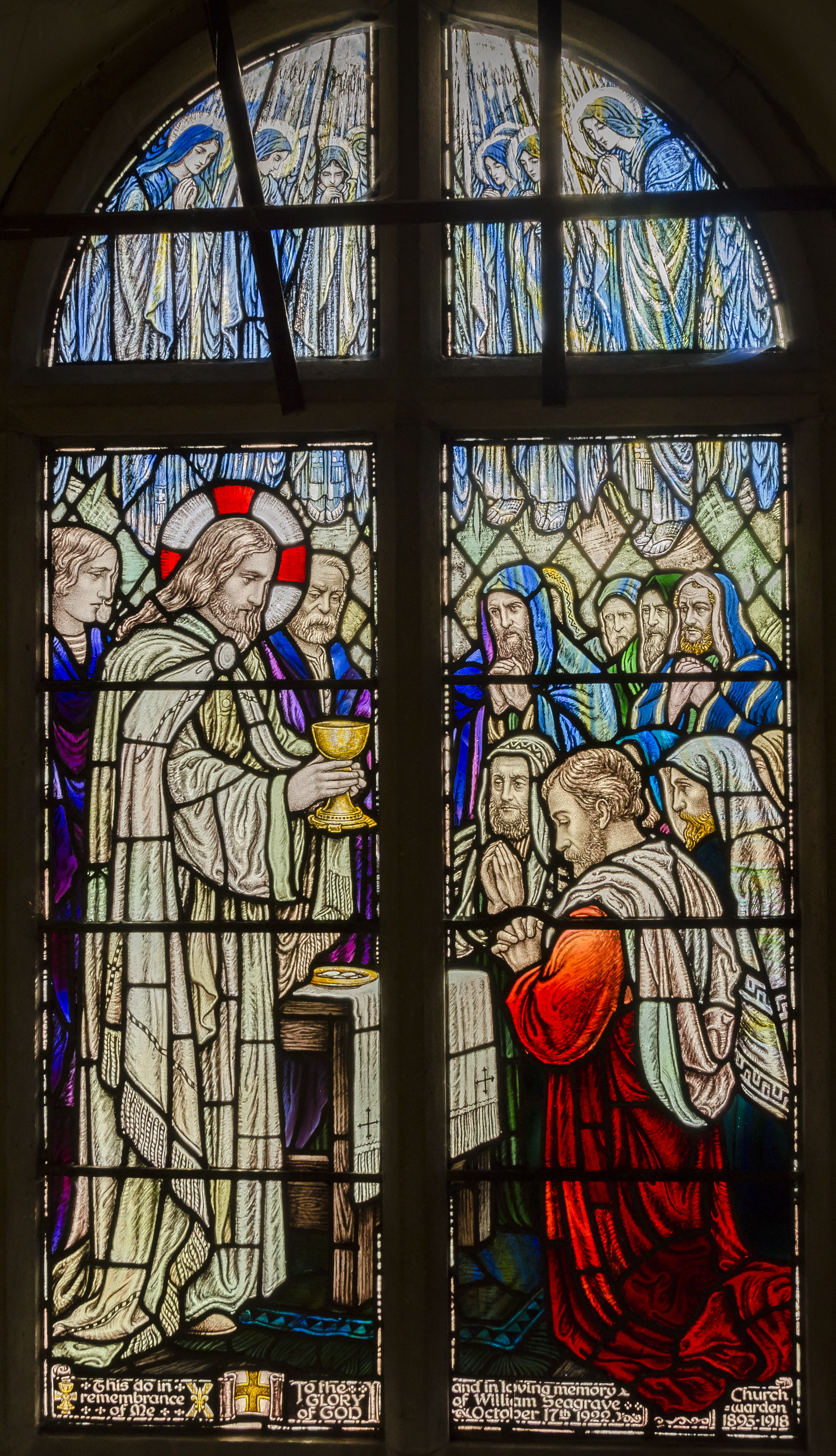
Church of St John the Baptist, Lissington, Lincolnshire – The Last Supper, c.1923.

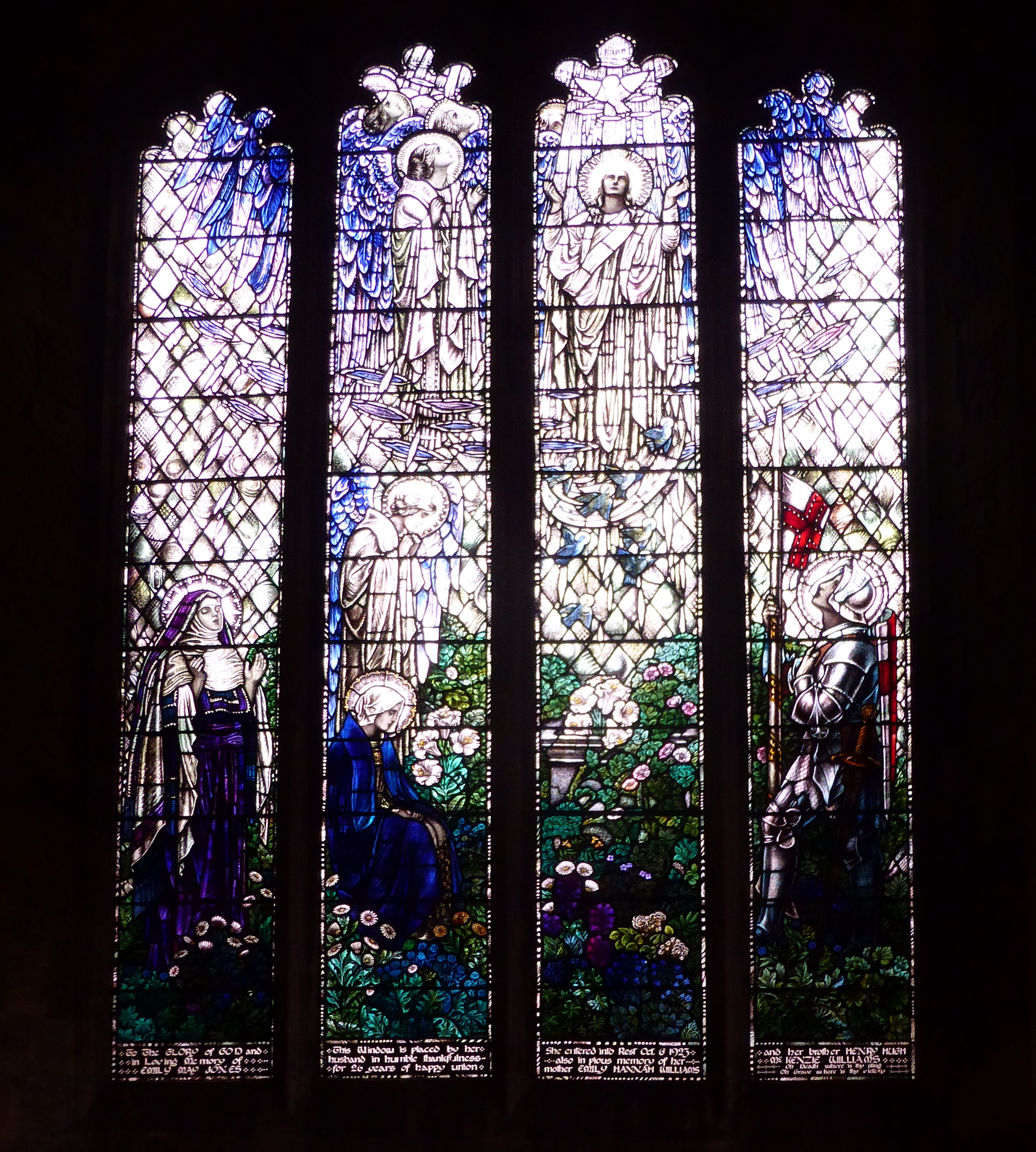
Church of St Peter and St Paul, Deddington, Oxfordshire - Assumption of the Virgin, 1924.

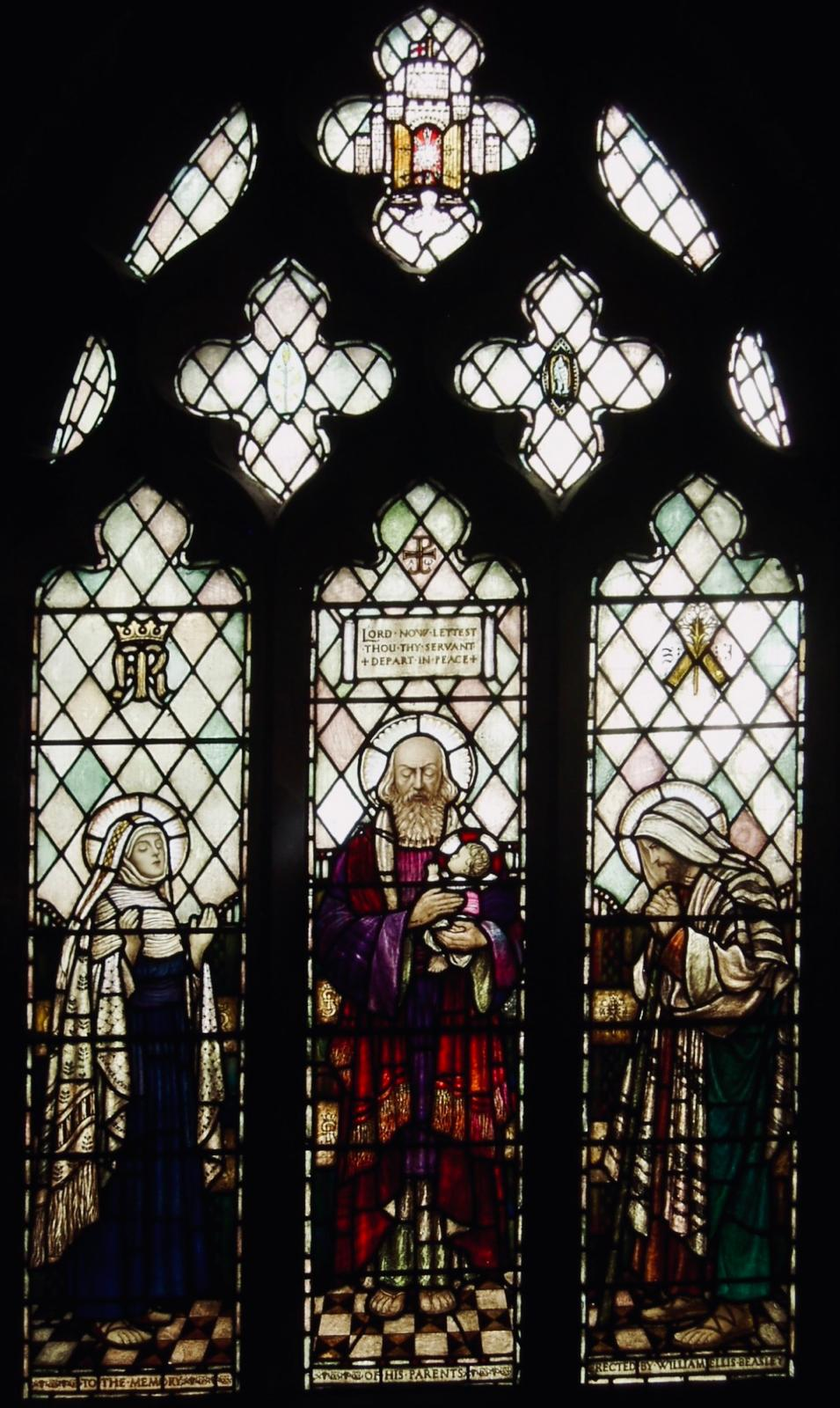
Church of St Andrew, Aylestone, Leicestershire - The Presentation of Jesus, c.1925.

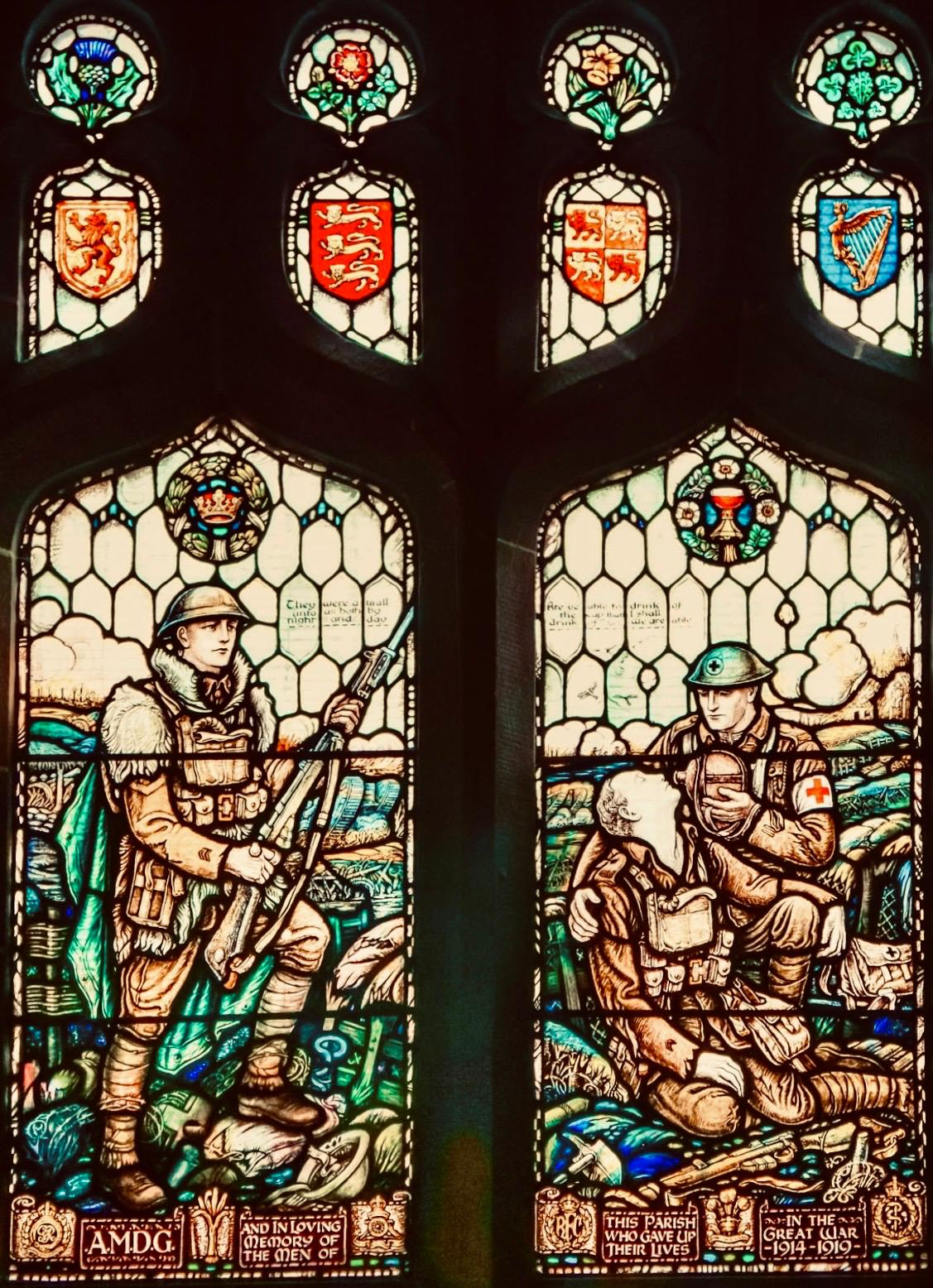
Christ Church, Rossett, Wrexham - War memorial window to parishioners killed in action during the First World War, 1925.

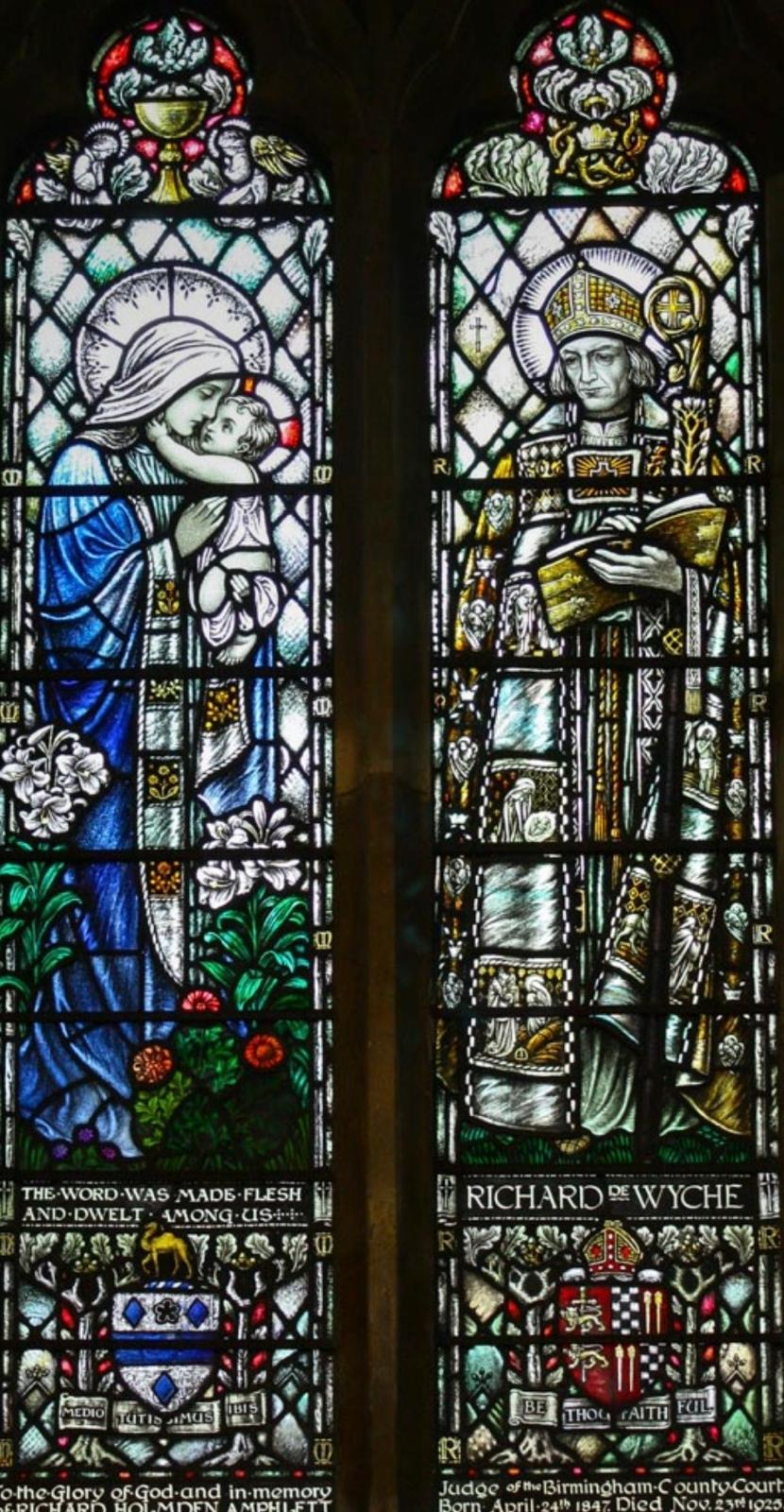
Church of St Mary de Wyche, Wychbold, Worcestershire - The Virgin and Child with Saint Richard de Wyche, 1927.

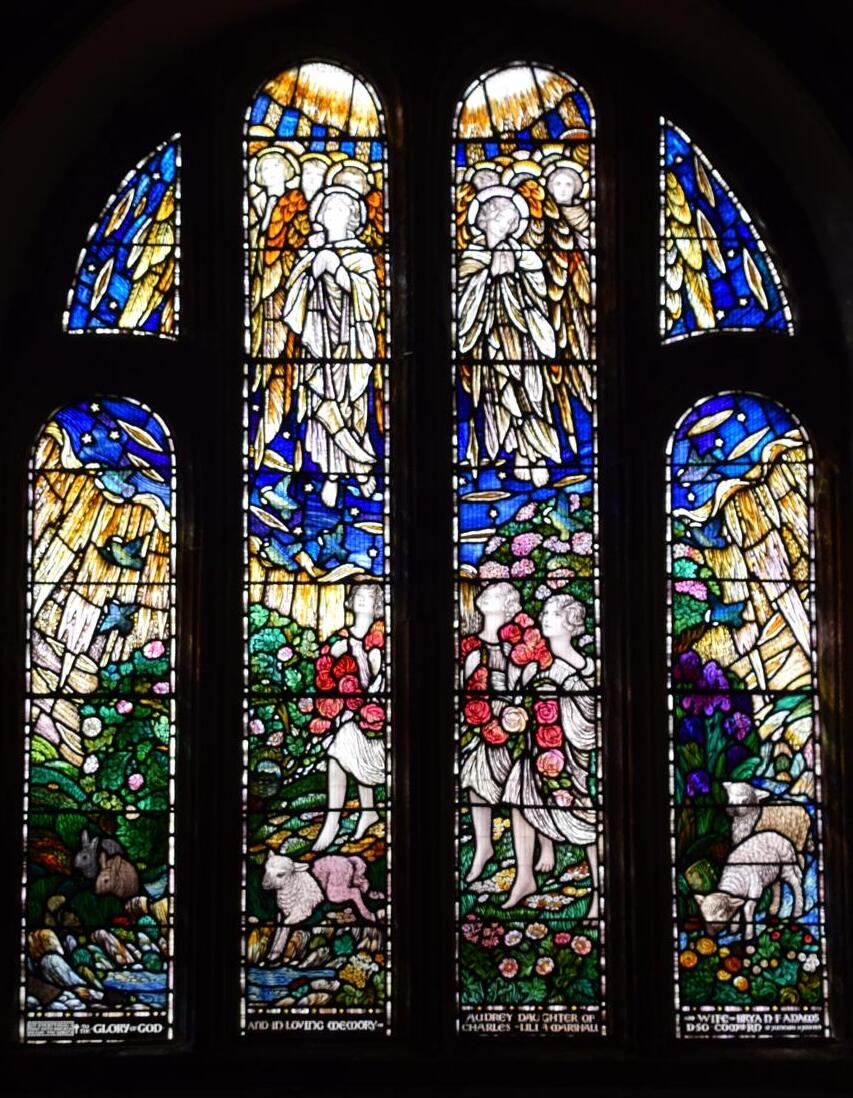
Church of All Saints, Thurlestone, Devon - Vision of Heaven, c.1930.

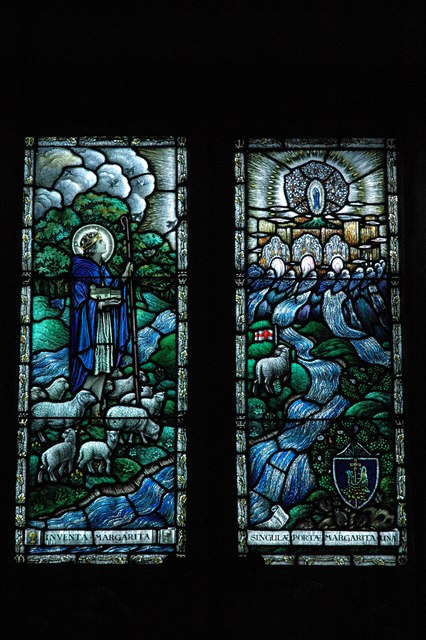
Church of St Margaret, St Margarets, Herefordshire - St Margaret and the path to the Heavenly City, c.1930.

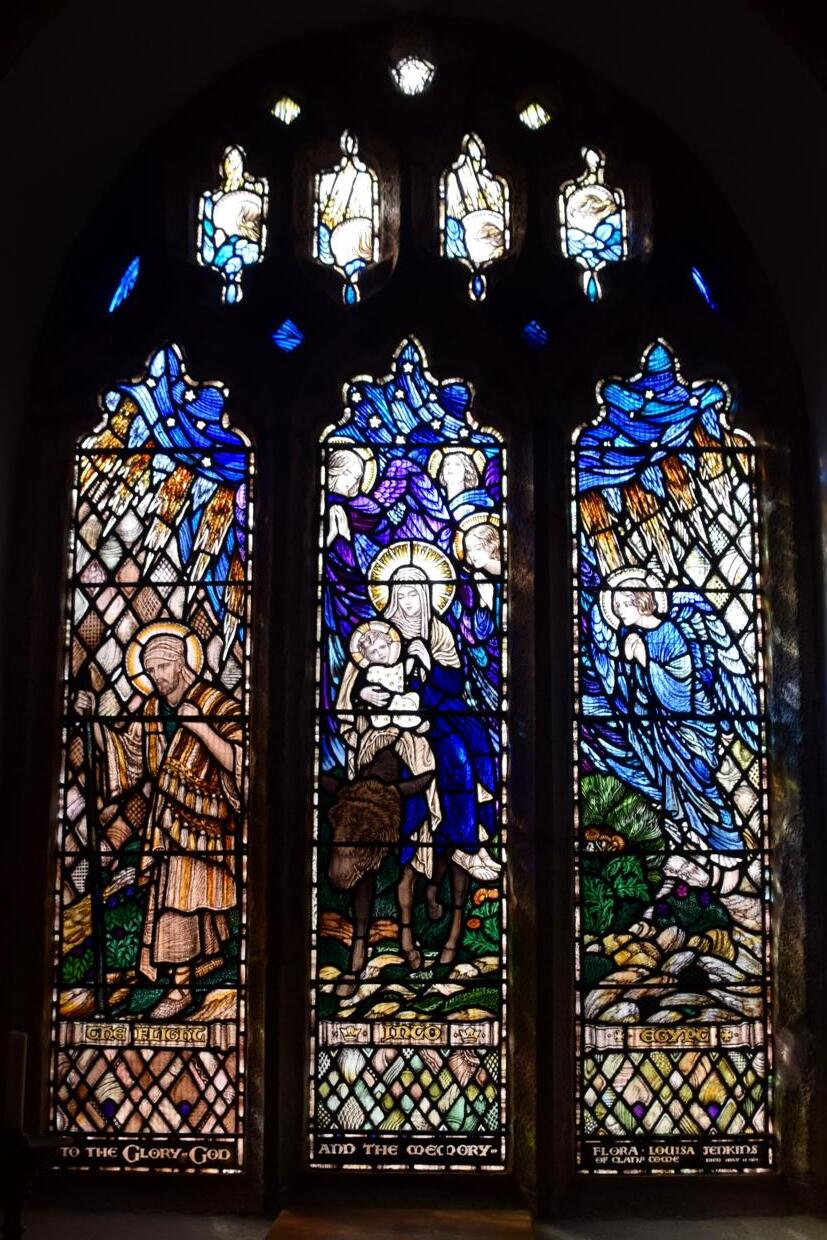
Church of All Saints, Thurlestone, Devon - Flight into Egypt, c.1933.

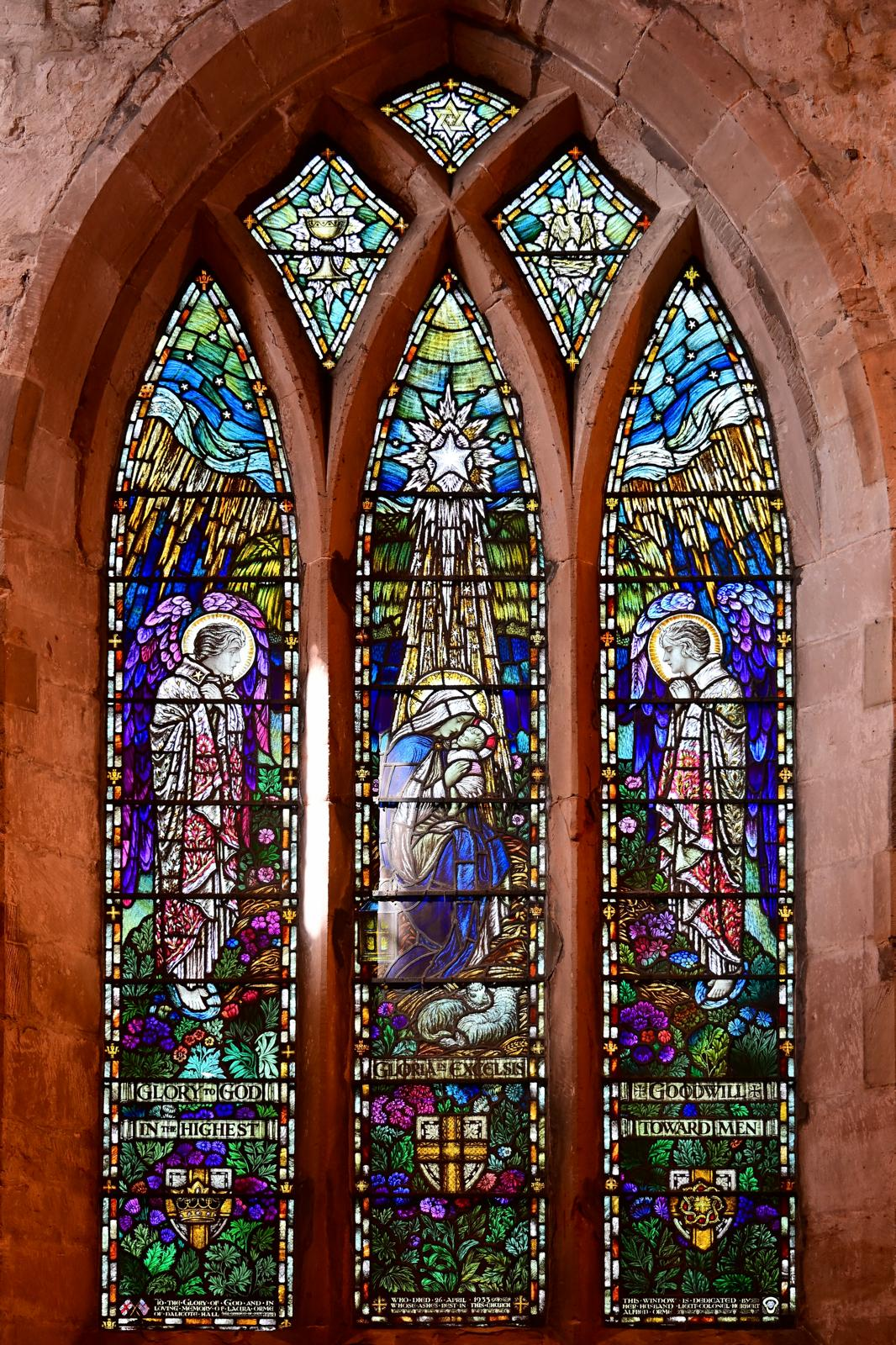
All Saints Church, Claverley - Virgin and Child with Angels, 1934.

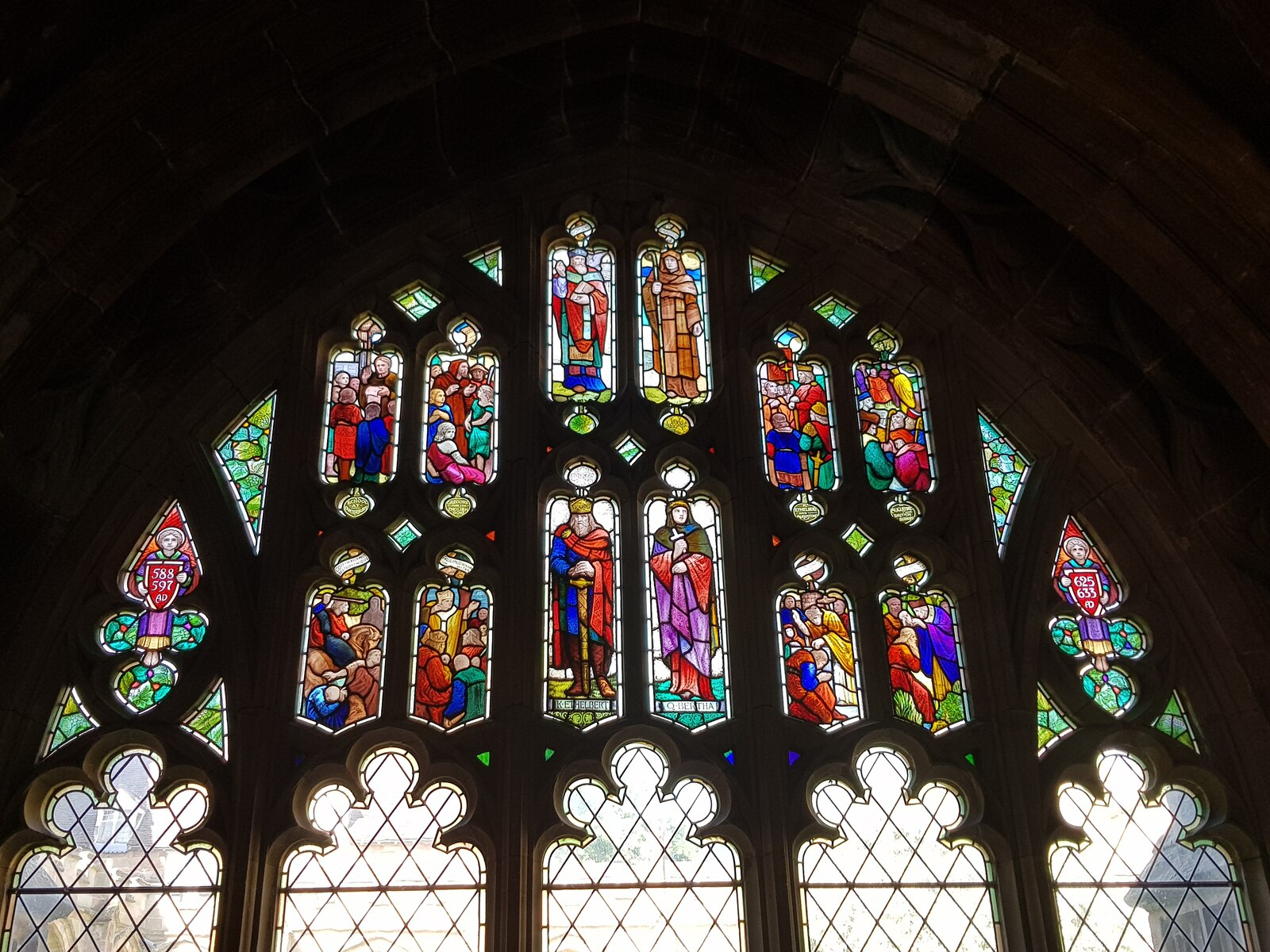
Worcester Cathedral, Worcester Cathedral - West cloister window, c.1935.

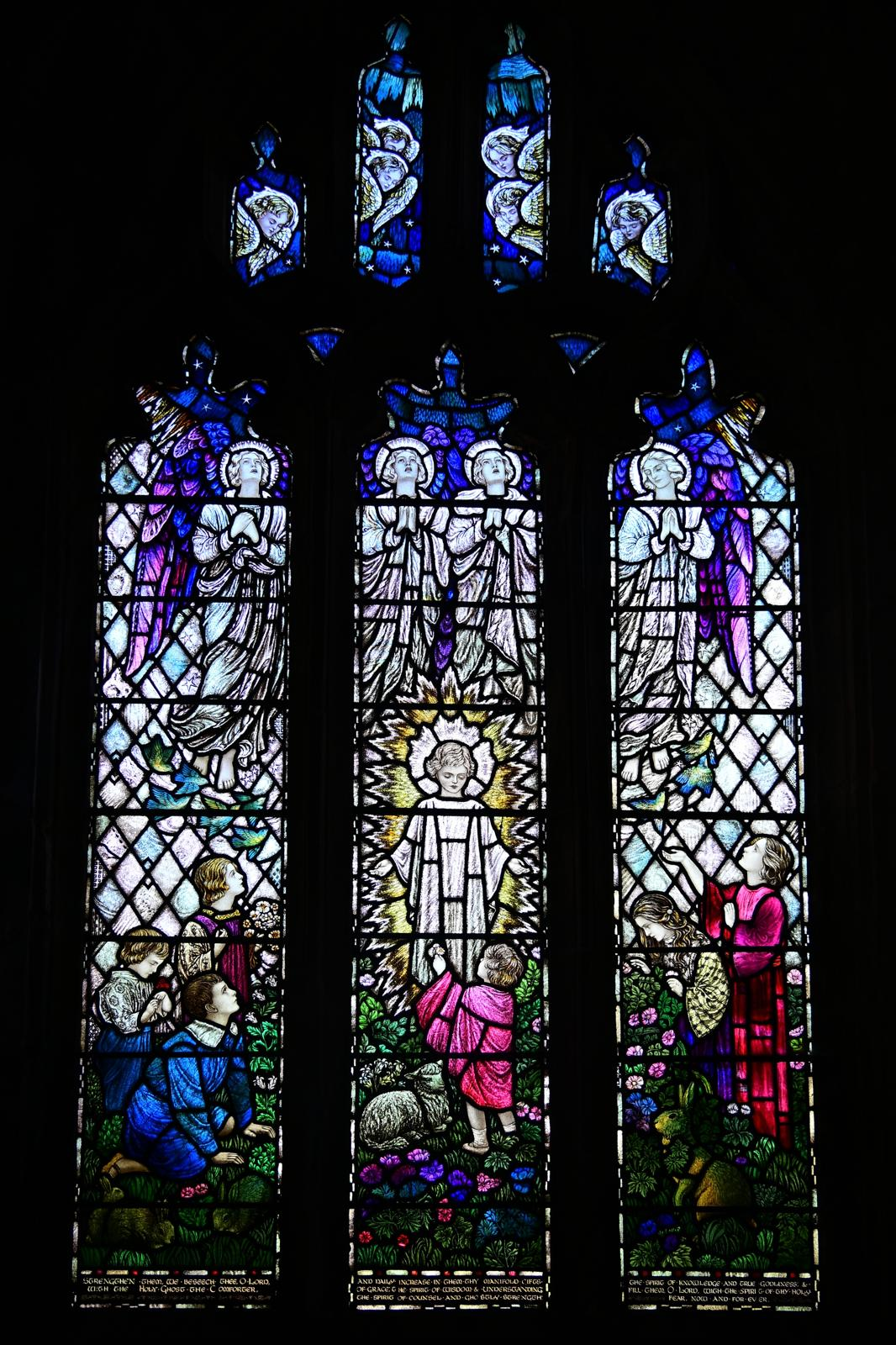
All Saints Church, Claverley - Christ Child, 1936.

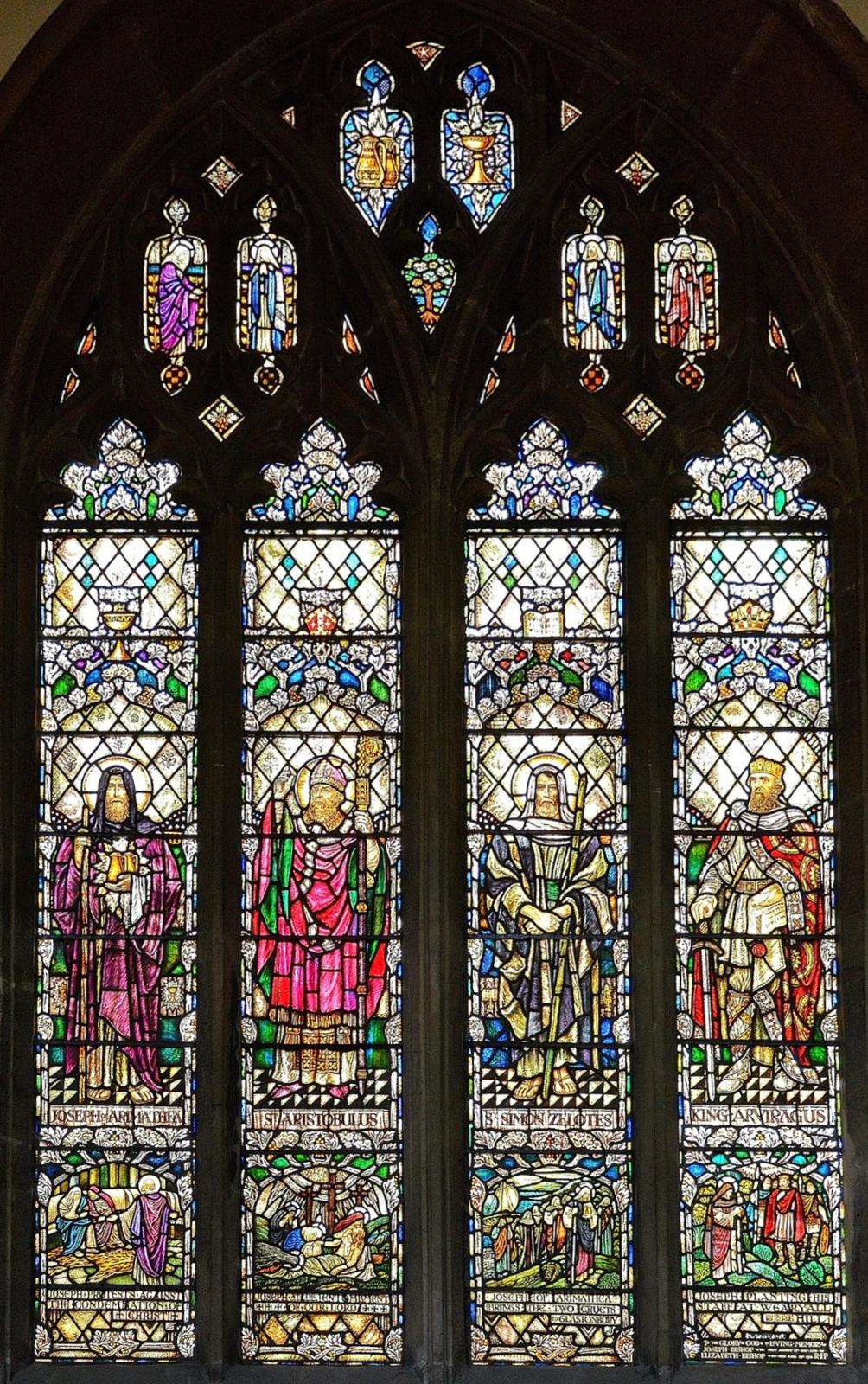
Church of St John the Baptist, Glastonbury, Somerset - Saints and legends associated with Glastonbury, 1936.

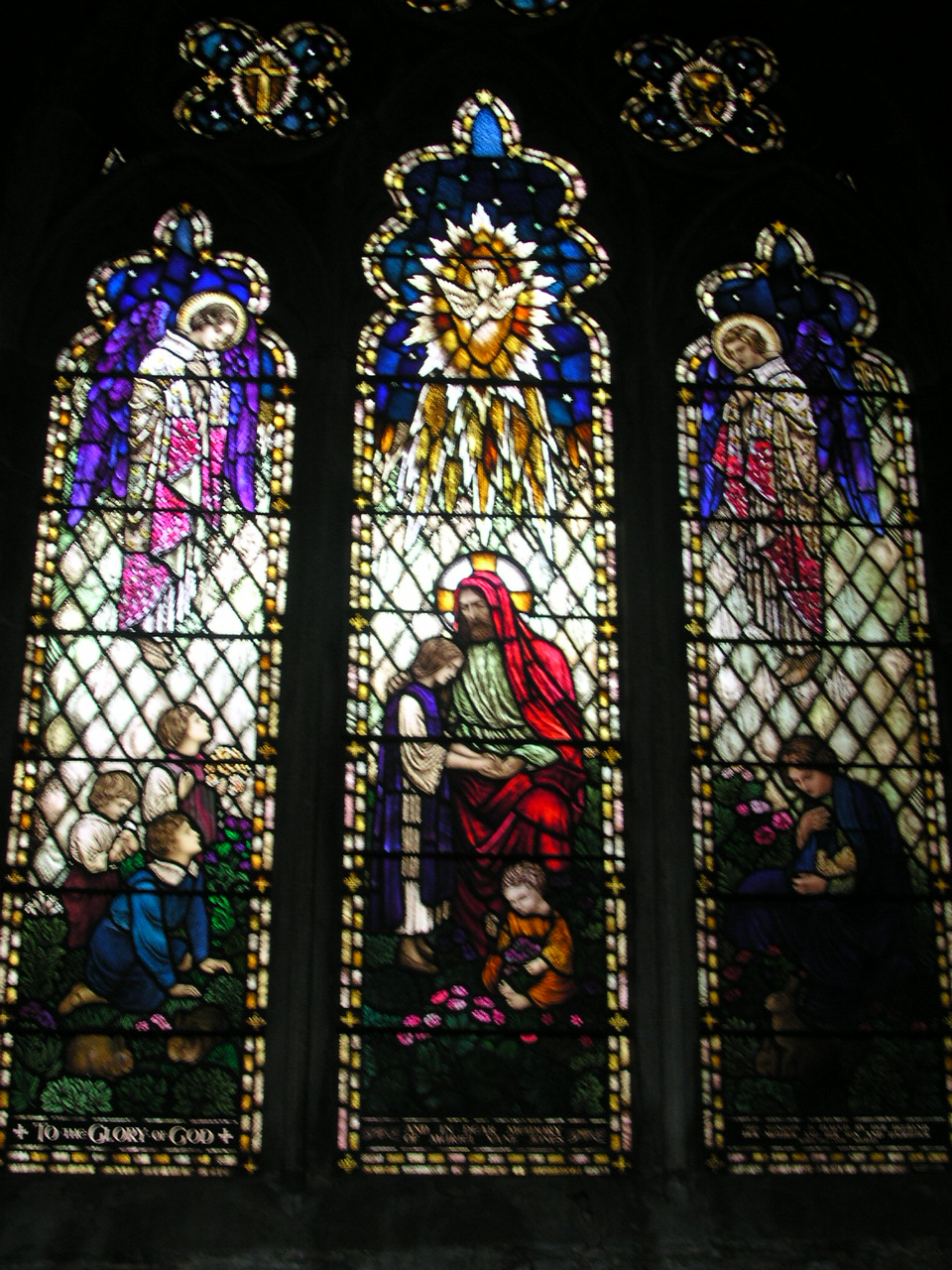
Church of St Peter and St Paul, Deddington, Oxfordshire - Christ among the Children, 1937.

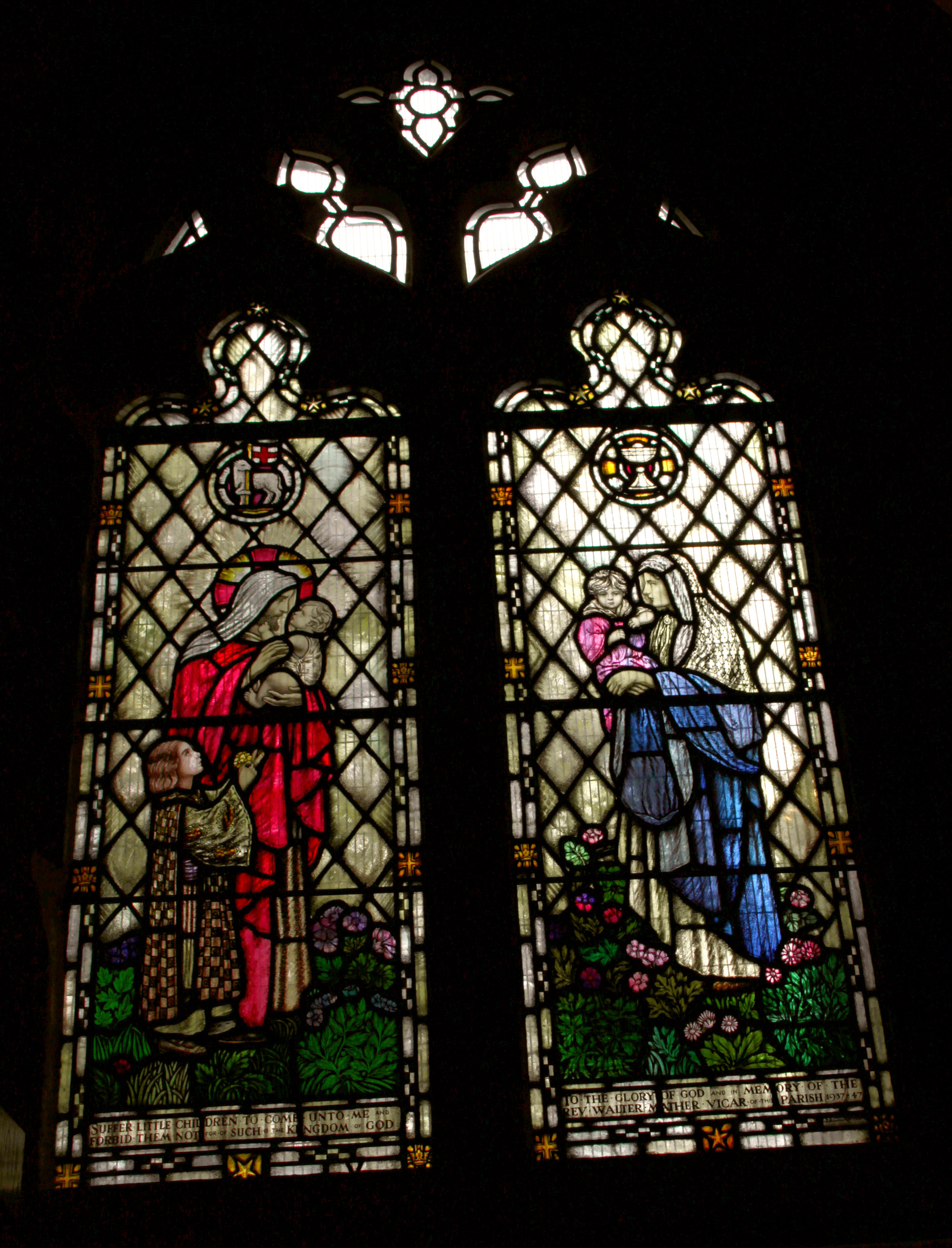
Church of St Matthew, Bankfoot, Bradford, West Yorkshire - Suffer the Little Children to come unto Me, c.1950

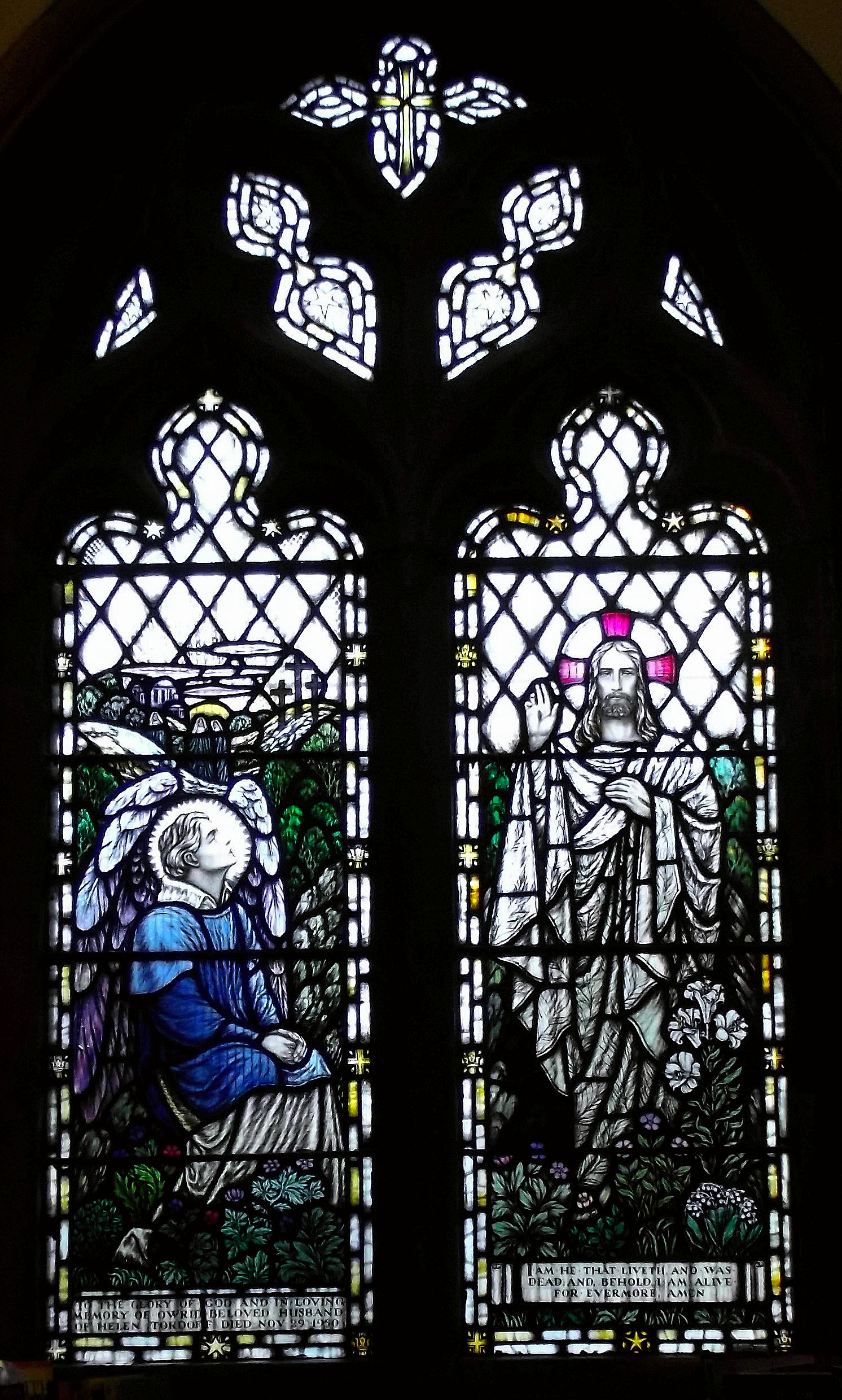
Church of St Matthew, Bankfoot, Bradford, West Yorkshire - The Risen Christ, c.1950.
