= Rosset =

Rosset may refer to:

== People ==
- Barney Rosset (1922–2012), American entrepreneur and publisher
- Clément Rosset (1939–2018), French philosopher and writer
- Macarena Rosset (born 1991), Argentine basketball player
- Marc Rosset (born 1970), Swiss tennis player
- Matthieu Rosset (born 1990), French diver
- Olivier Rosset (born 1971), French music entrepreneur
- Ricardo Rosset (born 1968), Brazilian racing driver

== Other uses ==
- Rosset sheep, a breed of domestic sheep

== See also ==
- Rossett village in North Wales
