= Rousset =

Rousset may refer to:

- Rousset, Bouches-du-Rhône, in the Bouches-du-Rhône département
- Rousset-les-Vignes, in the Drôme département
- Rousset-Serre-Ponçon, in the Hautes-Alpes département
- Rousset (grape), another name for the French wine grape Calitor
- Rousset (surname)
