= Rossett Hall =

Grade II listed building in Wales

Coordinates: 53.1102°N 2.9449°W

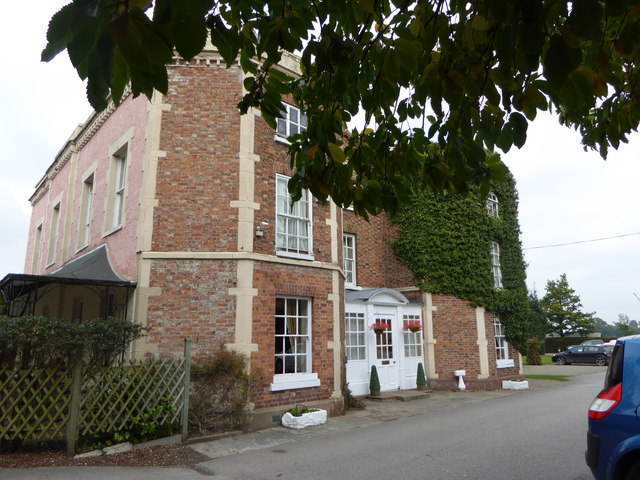

Rossett Hall is a mid-eighteenth century Grade II listed Georgian building situated in the village of Rossett, Wrexham County Borough, in the north of Wales. A former manor house, it is now a hotel under the Everbright Group.

== History ==
It was built in 1750 by John Boydell (1720–1804) as a country retreat for his family. Boydell was an engraver and publisher who became Lord Mayor of London in 1790.

Presently, Rossett Hall is operated by Everbright Group Hotels, it was a formerly independently owned hotel, with the hotel retaining much of the original manor house interior, such as the stone cantilevered staircase, grand chandelier, classical fireplace and lounge rooms.
