= Burton, Wrexham =

Village in Wrexham County Borough, Wales

Coordinates: 53.111°N 2.961°W

Burton: Welsh: Bwrton
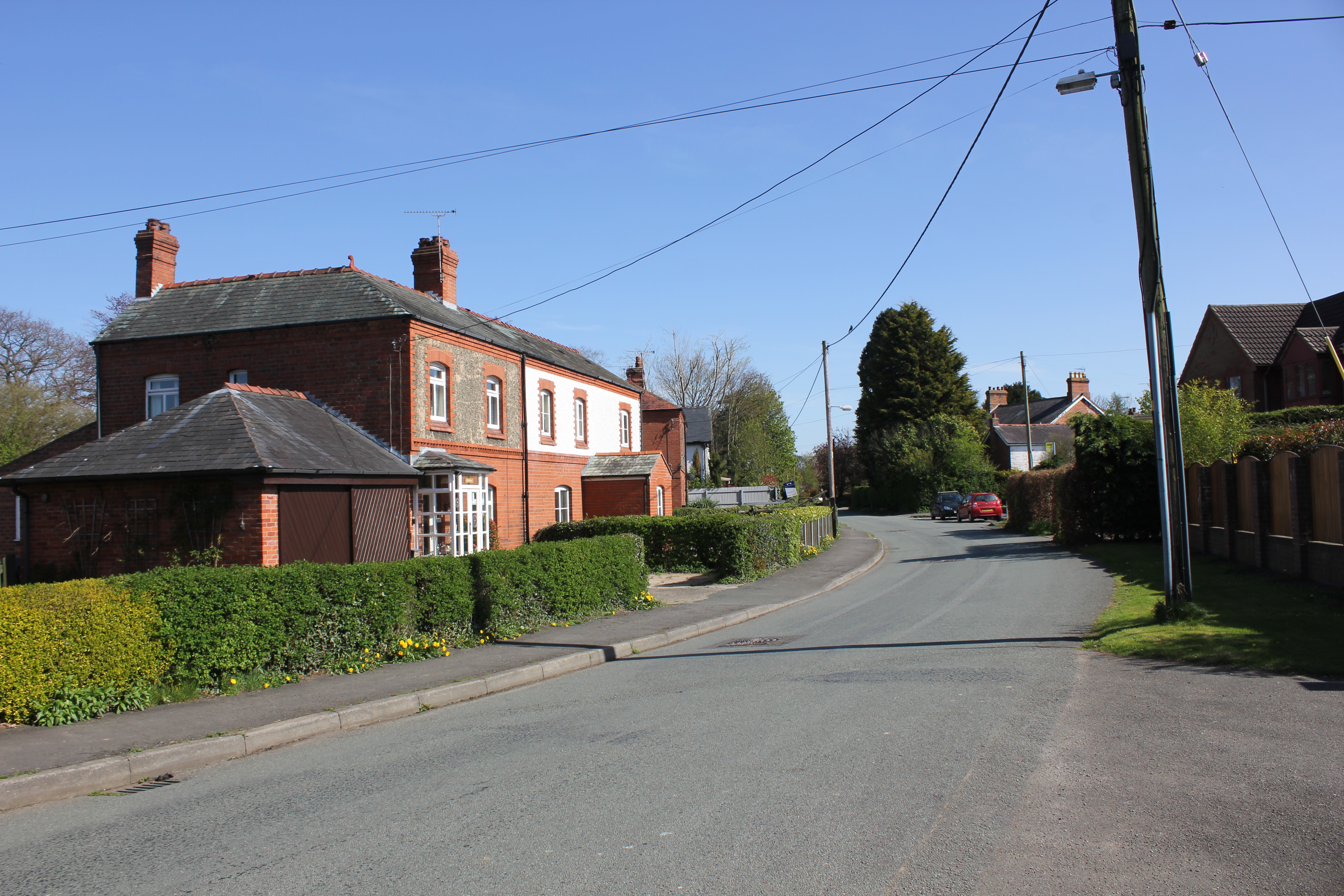
- Burton, in Wrexham County Borough

- Location within Wrexham
- OS grid reference: SJ357576
- Community: Rossett
- Principal area: Wrexham
- Preserved county: Clwyd
- Country: Wales
- Sovereign state: United Kingdom
- Post town: WREXHAM
- Postcode district: LL12
- Dialling code: 01244
- Police: North Wales
- Fire: North Wales
- Ambulance: Welsh
- UK Parliament: Wrexham
- Senedd Cymru – Welsh Parliament: Wrexham

Burton (Welsh: Bwrton; Welsh pronunciation) is a village in the community of Rossett in Wrexham County Borough, Wales. The hamlet of Burton Green is a separate settlement and is located around a mile northwest from Burton.

The village is predominantly rural in nature and comprises a mixture of working farms and residential properties.

Burton is 2 miles from the larger village of Rossett, where there is a variety of shops, a primary school, a secondary school, a post office, chemist, a Catholic church, off-licence, and plenty of good pubs and eateries including the award-winning Welsh restaurant 'The Machine House'. There is a popular monthly farmers' market in the village hall.

Despite the proximity to the border with England, 7.7% of Burton residents are Welsh speakers.

== History ==
It is an ancient village that, before the coming of the North Wales Mineral Railway, was more important than Rossett itself. The village dates back to Saxon times and was settled by Anglo-Saxons from the Kingdom of Mercia. Today the village is little more than a backwater on the old road between Rossett and Caergwrle.

In the early part of 2002 a trio of friends were metal detecting on a farm close to Burton, when they found a hoard of gold and other artifacts from the Bronze Age. These included a twisted wire bracelet, a necklace called a torc, a bracelet, a pendant and a collection of beads and rings - all gold, along with several axes. The finds later to be known as 'The Burton Hoard' were declared treasure trove and purchased by the National Museum Wales (formerly NMGW) for £85,000.

In September 2021, a three-week archaeological dig was conducted following the discovery of a Roman villa on farmland near Burton Green.
