= Presbyterian Chapel, Rossett =

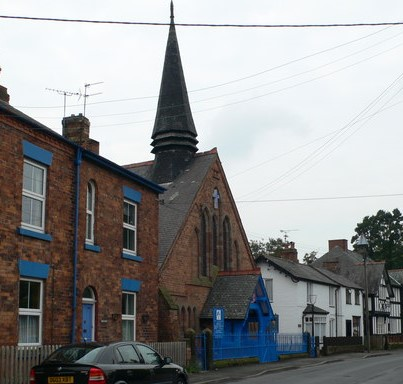
- Presbyterian Chapel, Rossett
- 53.1076°N 2.9524°W
- OS grid reference: SJ 363 571
- Location: Station Road, Rossett, Wrexham County Borough
- Country: Wales
- Denomination: Presbyterian Church of Wales

Architecture
- Architect: John Douglas
- Architectural type: Chapel
- Style: Gothic Revival
- Completed: 1875

The Presbyterian Chapel, Rossett, is on Station Road, in Rossett, Wrexham County Borough, Wales. It continues to be active as a Welsh Presbyterian church.

The church was built in 1875 to a design by the Chester architect John Douglas. It has lancet windows and a flèche which is tiered at its base. At the end of the gable is a timber porch.

== See also ==
- List of new churches by John Douglas
