= Russet =

Russet may refer to:

- Russet (cloth), a coarse woolen cloth of brown or grey colour
- Russet (color), a dark reddish brown color
- Russeting, reddish-brown and coarse anomaly of fruit skin
  - Russet apple
  - Russet potato
- Russet, West Virginia, an unincorporated community
- Russet Perry, Virginia State Senator
