= Cook's Bridge, Rossett =

Bridge in Wrexham, Wales

Cook's Bridge
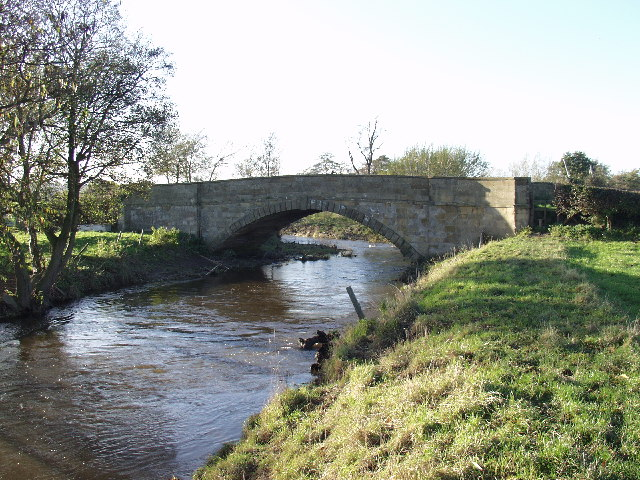
- The bridge from the west.
- Coordinates: 53.100459°N 2.924153°W
- Crosses: River Alyn
- Locale: Allington, Rossett, Wrexham, Wales
- Heritage status: Grade II

Characteristics
- Design: Arch bridge
- Material: Ashlar
- Height: 10 metres (33 ft)
- No. of lanes: one

History
- Construction end: early 19th century

Statistics

Listed Building – Grade II
- Official name: Cook's Bridge
- Designated: 18 October 1996; Amended 18 October 1996
- Reference no.: 17456

Cook's Bridge is a Grade II listed bridge crossing the River Alyn near Trevalyn, Rossett in Wrexham County Borough, Wales. It is located to the south-east of Cooksbridge Farm, and roughly a third of a mile or half a kilometre from Rossett Road (B5102).

The bridge dates to the early 19th century and contains a single-span of ashlar stone. The segmental arch has voussoirs and a keystone projecting into string course. The bridge's parapets are swept widely at either end to allow for waiting traffic, as the bridge is a single-laned bridge.

A long-distance waymarked footpath lies to its immediate north along the river. The bridge is listed by Cadw.

== See also ==
- List of bridges in Wales
