= Christ Church, Rossett =

Anglican church in Wrexham County, Wales

Coordinates: 53.10803°N 2.94995°W

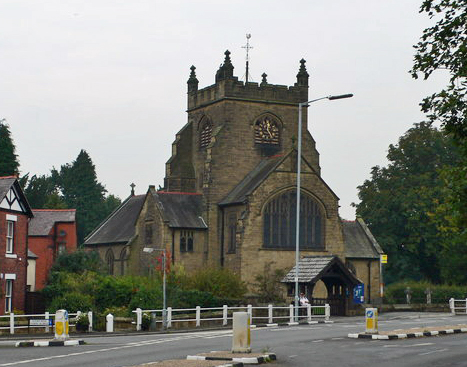
- Christ Church, Rossett, from the southeast
- Christ Church, Rossett
- OS grid reference: SJ 365,571
- Location: Station Road, Rossett, Wrexham County Borough
- Country: Wales
- Denomination: Anglican (Church in Wales)

History
- Dedication: 31 October
- Consecrated: 31 October 1892

Architecture
- Heritage designation: Grade II
- Designated: 18 October 1996
- Architect: Douglas and Fordham
- Architectural type: Church
- Style: Gothic Revival
- Groundbreaking: 1891
- Completed: 1892
- Construction cost: £3,677

Specifications
- Materials: Stone, green slate roof

Administration
- Province: Wales
- Diocese: St Asaph
- Archdeaconry: Wrexham wales
- Deanery: Alyn Mission Area
- Parish: Alyn Mission Area

Clergy
- Vicar: The Rev’d Huw Butler

Christ Church is a church of the Church in Wales, situated in Rossett, Wrexham County Borough, Wales. It is designated by Cadw as a Grade II listed building. Christ Church is an active Anglican church in the Alyn Mission Area, the archdeaconry of Wrexham and the diocese of St Asaph.

== History ==
The first church on the site was built in 1841. The present church had been designed in 1886 by the Chester architects Douglas and Fordham, but it was not built until 1891–92. The foundation stone was laid by Mrs Townshend Mainwaring. It cost over £3,677 (equivalent to £400,000 in 2025), the major donor was John Townsend of Trevalyn House, and £2,861 (equivalent to £310,000 in 2025) was raised by public subscription. A clock was added in 1902.

== Architecture ==
The church is built of stone with a green slate roof in Gothic Revival style. Its plan is cruciform with a central tower over the choir at the crossing. It has a five-bay nave with a north aisle, a short chancel, north and south transepts and a south porch. The south transept is used as the vestry and the north transept contains a small chapel. The tower has buttresses on the north and south sides only which are in line with the east and west faces, and there are similar buttresses at the east end of the church. The clock face is on the east wall of the tower and on the other sides of the tower are three-light louvred bell openings. The top of the tower is crenellated with a pinnacle surmounted by a crocketted finial at each corner. The windows have Perpendicular tracery. The porch is gabled, with a canopied niche above the doorway, and side buttresses. The niche contains a statue of Christ the Good Shepherd. The east window has seven lights. At the angle of the south nave and the south transept is an attached stair-turret.

Internally, the arcade between the nave and the aisle has octagonal piers. The wooden furnishings, including the reredos, the stalls, the pews and the organ case were designed by Douglas. The stained glass in the east window (1905), and in the easternmost window on the south wall of the nave (1904) is by Kempe. The north window in the chancel has stained glass designed and made by Morris & Co. (1907) and in the north transept is glass dating from the late 1920s by Heaton, Butler and Bayne. The War Memorial window in arts and crafts style, showing three soldiers of the Welch Regiment, is by Archibald John Davies of the Bromsgrove Guild of Applied Arts (1925).

The architectural writer Goodhart-Rendel commented about the church: "Inside and out this building has real charm, and is beautifully thorough in detail".

== Churchyard ==
The churchyard contains the village war memorial and the Commonwealth War Graves Commission of seven British Army personnel, five from World War I and two from World War II.

== See also ==
- List of new churches by John Douglas
