= Rousset (surname) =

The French-language surname Rousset may refer to:

- Alain Rousset (born 1951), French politician
- Christophe Rousset (born 1961), French conductor and harpsichordist
- Gilles Rousset (born 1963), French footballer
- David Rousset (1912–1997), French writer and prisoner in the German Neuengamme concentration camp
- Jean-François Rousset (born 1952), French politician
- Jean Rousset (1910–2002), Swiss literary critic and theorist, often associated with the Geneva School of literary criticism
- Jean Rousset de Missy (1686–1762), French writer
- Louis Rousset (born 1999), French racing driver
- Marie-Christine Rousset (born 1958), French computer scientist
