= Rossett =

Village in Wrexham County Borough, Wales

Rossett: Welsh: Yr Orsedd
- Village
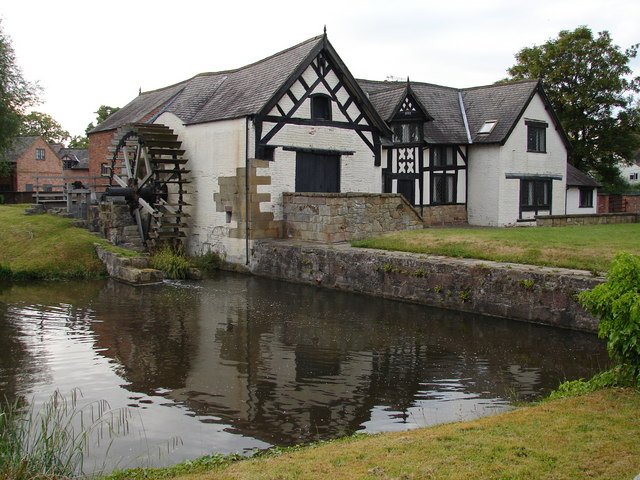
- 16th-century mill in Rossett

- Location within Wrexham
- Population: 3,231 (2011 census)
- OS grid reference: SJ368573
- Community: Rossett
- Principal area: Wrexham
- Preserved county: Clwyd
- Country: Wales
- Sovereign state: United Kingdom
- Post town: WREXHAM
- Postcode district: LL12
- Dialling code: 01978; 01244
- Police: North Wales
- Fire: North Wales
- Ambulance: Welsh
- UK Parliament: Wrexham
- Senedd Cymru – Welsh Parliament: Wrexham
- List of places UK Wales Wrexham 53°06′32″N 2°56′42″W

Rossett (Welsh: Yr Orsedd or Yr Orsedd Goch) is a village, community and electoral ward in Wrexham County Borough, Wales. Rossett is served by the A483 road.

At the time of the 2001 census, Rossett community (including Rossett itself and the villages of Burton, Burton Green, Trevalyn and Lavister) had a total population of 3,336 people, falling to 3,231 in the 2011 census.

== Geography ==
Rossett is geographically located near to the cities of Wrexham (6 1/2 miles (10.5 km) distant) and Chester (7 1/2 miles (12.1 km) away). The village sits close to the Wales–England border and is built on the banks of the River Alyn which is a tributary of the River Dee 1 1/2 miles (2.4 km) downstream.

Rossett's neighbouring villages are Marford, Burton and Holt and Pulford in England.

== Community ==
Christ Church, completed in 1892 replacing an earlier church on the same site, is of Gothic Revival design. The village's war memorial is sited in its churchyard. Other places of worship include the Old Church, the Roman Catholic Church of Christ the King, a Baptist Church and a Presbyterian Chapel.

== Landmarks ==
Trevalyn Hall is a Grade II* listed Elizabethan manor house built in 1576. The house and its grounds were owned by the Trevor family for several generations. During the 1980s the building was converted into apartments.

Rossett Mill is a Grade II* listed watermill built in 1588. Of timber-framed construction on a stone base, the mill was extended in 1661 and during the 1820s. The mill is occasionally opened to the public for visiting. The landscape artist J. M. W. Turner sketched the building in 1795.

Marford Mill, opposite Rossett Mill, was first built around 1086 and is mentioned in the Domesday Book. Until the building of Rossett Mill it was the only mill in the area. Marford Mill has an unusual double wheel. The Mill has been the home, since the 1980s, to the British Association for Shooting and Conservation, the UK's largest shooting association.

Cook's Bridge crosses the River Alyn and is Grade II listed. It is a single-span stone bridge constructed in the early nineteenth century.

A sacred well, St. Peter's well, rises 450 yards from the site of an old chapel which was demolished in the 17th century. The well had a reputation for the cure of sore eyes and sprained limbs.

In 2020, the remains of a Roman villa were found under a field in the village.

== Notable people ==
Russ Abbot (b 1947) lived in Rossett.
