= Esclusham Mountain =

Uplands near Wrexham, Wales

Coordinates: 53°00′31″N 03°08′49″W

Esclusham Mountain (Welsh: Mynydd Esclus or Mynydd Esclys) is an area in Wrexham County Borough, Wales, United Kingdom, and is part of the Ruabon Moors. It rises to a height of 458 - 460 m. It lies partly within the community of Esclusham. Part of the hill within the neighbouring community of Minera is known as Minera Mountain.

== Geology ==
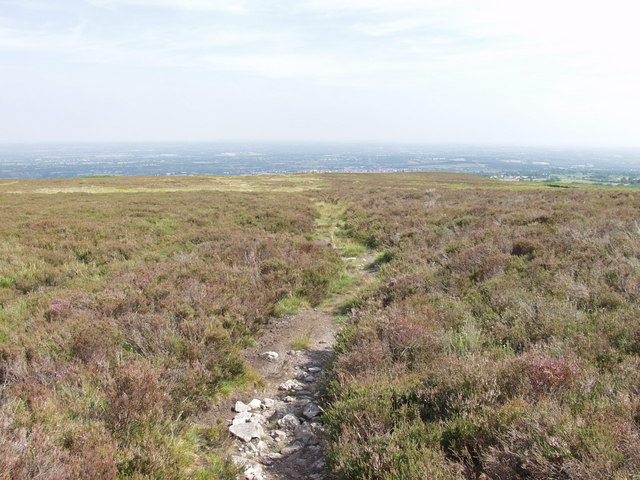
Footpath across Fron-dêg Flat on Esclusham Mountain

The underlying rocks are Carboniferous Limestone along with some Millstone Grit to the east. The area was rich in minerals, particularly lead and zinc deposits. The South Minera Vein, a fault fissure rilled with mineral matter, runs through the area of Esclusham Mountain and, until the second decade of the 20th century, there were many lead mines in the area, some of whose levels joined with the substantial system of natural caves beneath the mountain.

The 8 km long Minera Caves, Ogof Llyn Parc and Ogof Cefn-y-Gist have their entrances on the moor. These have passages close to Ogof Dydd Byraf and Ogof Llyn Du whose entrances are in Minera Limeworks.

These are Sites of Special Scientific Interest, and are being targeted for development as a possible tourist and educational resource.

== History ==
The area shows signs of use by Neolithic and Bronze Age farmers, and evidence of early inhabitants of the area exists in the form of several stone cairns and other features. The high ground was good summer pasture, and in the mediaeval period there are references to hafodydd (summer houses for those overseeing the grazing flocks) in the possession of Valle Crucis Abbey on the northern part of Esclusham Mountain.

Though there may have been small-scale mining of lead on the mountain in earlier periods, development of the area's mineral resources started in earnest from the eighteenth century and into the nineteenth, with the application of techniques brought from Cornwall. The mines were further developed in the nineteenth century under the guidance of the mining engineer and entrepreneur John Taylor: at their peak they were the most productive lead mines in Britain.

== Landscape and wildlife ==
The lower eastern slopes of the mountain have a landscape of pastureland, small farms and woods. The higher moorland above Fron-dêg, known as the Fron-dêg Flat, has typical moorland vegetation of heather, bilberry and sedge; rarer plants include the dark red helleborine. Hill farming is still practised, with sheep grazing across the moor. There are still surface remains of former lead workings, particularly in the areas known as Pool Park and Gwter Siani, with the foundations of old engine-houses, managers' residences and chimneys being visible in some places.

The moorland supports a rich variety of wildlife including black grouse, red grouse, short-eared owl and ring ouzel.

A single-track road runs across the northern part of the mountain from Minera, through Pool Park and Gwter Siani, to Eglwyseg and on towards Llangollen. Several footpaths, popular with ramblers, also run across the mountain, including the Offa's Dyke Path.
