= Coedpoeth =

Village in Wales

Coedpoeth: Welsh: Coed-poeth
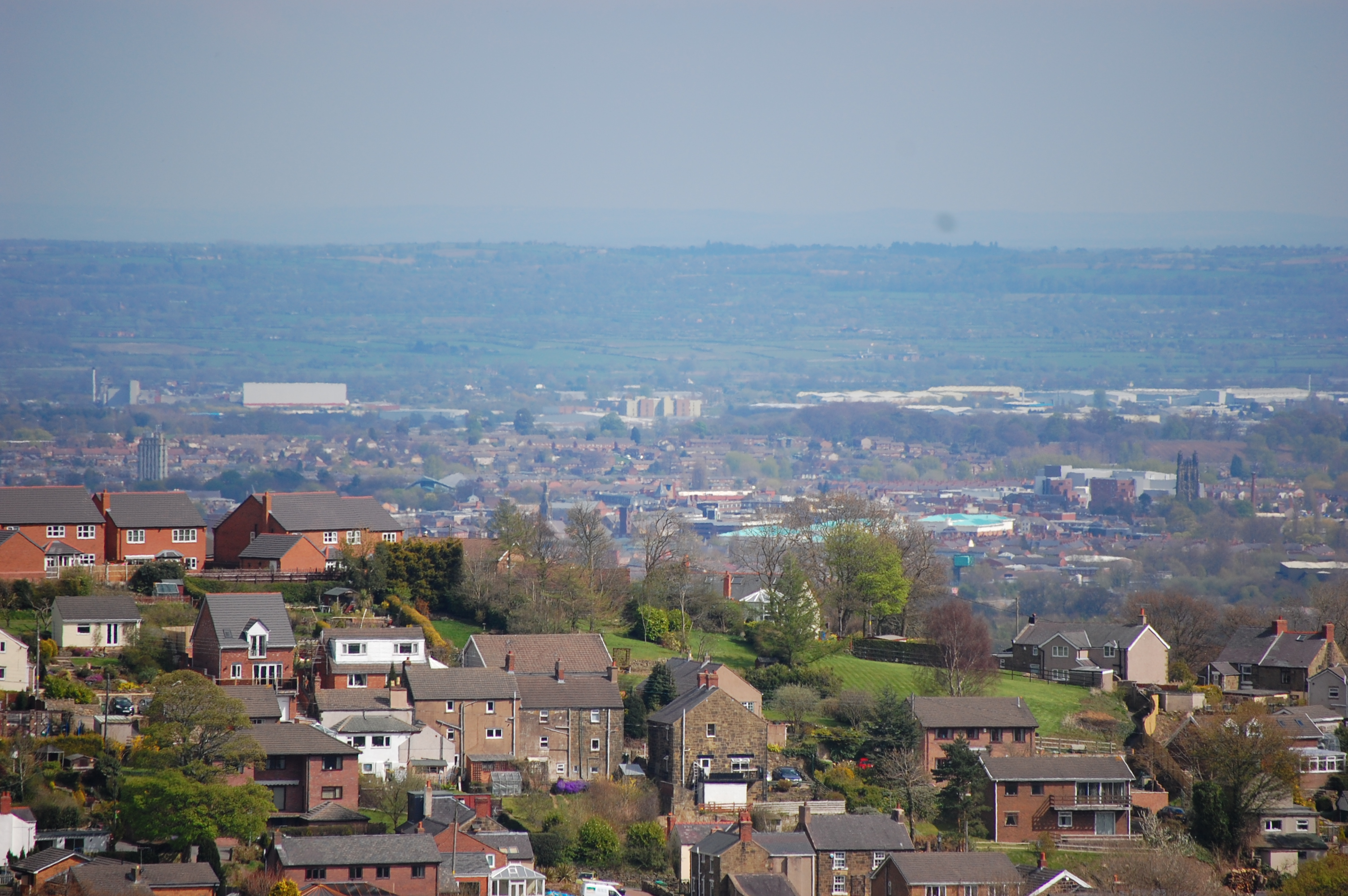
- Coedpoeth in the foreground with Wrexham in the background

- Location within Wrexham
- Population: 4,702 (2011 census)
- OS grid reference: SJ285515
- Community: Coedpoeth
- Principal area: Wrexham
- Preserved county: Clwyd
- Country: Wales
- Sovereign state: United Kingdom
- Post town: WREXHAM
- Postcode district: LL11
- Dialling code: 01978
- Police: North Wales
- Fire: North Wales
- Ambulance: Welsh
- UK Parliament: Wrexham
- Senedd Cymru – Welsh Parliament: Clwyd South
- List of places UK Wales Wrexham 53.054°N 3.074°W Map of the community

Coedpoeth (Welsh: Coed-poeth; [kɔidpɔiθ]) is a village and community in Wrexham County Borough, Wales. The built-up area with Minera had a population of 5,723 in the 2011 census.

== Locality ==
Coedpoeth is on a hill between the Clywedog and Gwenfro valleys, surrounded by countryside with views of the Cheshire plain, Tanyfron, Southsea and the city of Wrexham.

The highest point of the village is Rock Place at 800 feet (245 m) above sea-level. The neighbouring village of Bwlchgwyn is one of several claiming to be the highest village in Wales, at 1090 feet (333 m).

The area is prone to snowfall, and has suffered localised flooding in recent years due to heavy rain. Welsh Water significantly invested in new drainage for the village in 2012, alleviating this problem.

== History ==
The etymology of the placename is from Welsh coed "wood" with poeth meaning, in its original sense, "burnt", although the modern Welsh word translates as "hot". The name therefore translates roughly as "burnt wood", perhaps referring to the charcoal burning heritage in the village and local woods.

In its early history the area known as Coedpoeth was not a settlement, but was described (in 1411) as a "waste" – an uncultivated area – and later as a "common", presumably a wood with rights of common, in the upper part of the township of Bersham. By the early 19th century this common fell within Minera, and under the Inclosures Act for the township of Minera in July 1809, the 'common called Coed Poeth' was subdivided into 11 parcels of land. Even as recently as 1832, the village of Coedpoeth did not yet exist as it currently does, and was instead four small hamlets. The Nant (from the Welsh word nant, a stream or brook) to the south possessed two mills on the River Clywedog: Adwy'r Clawdd (literally "the gap in the dyke") to the north-east was named after a gap in Offa's Dyke. The Talwrn (from Welsh talwrn, a cockpit, or more usually a field or open space) in the valley of the River Gwenfro to the north, was home to several small-scale coal mines, and the name of the Smelt, to the west, referred to smelting of lead in the area. These four hamlets became areas of Coedpoeth which grew, with increasing industrial development, around the inns and market hall on the ridge that became the high street of the village. The changes in population were reflected by a new church opening in 1875, with a replacement stone-built church, dedicated to St. Tudfil, being opened in 1895 as a chapel of ease within the ecclesiastical parish of Minera. By the 1860s, the village was named Coed Poeth, and this form of the name remained until the 1940s at the latest. The majority of 18th to early 20th century buildings in the village are constructed from local sandstone quarried at Penygelli quarries, with later examples being built with Ruabon red brick.

The Catholic church in Coedpoeth was built in 1991. The building is also used by the Salvation Army.

A traditionally Welsh-speaking village, the use of Welsh has declined rapidly in the last two decades.

== Governance ==
Location of the Coedpoeth electoral ward in Wrexham County Borough, Wales.

In civil administrative terms, Coedpoeth remained within the civil parish of Bersham until later reorganisations, notably the 1974 changes subsequent to the Local Government Act 1972, which saw Coedpoeth included in its own local government community, with Bersham village placed in the community of Esclusham.

Coedpoeth is also an electoral ward to Wrexham County Borough Council. Since 1995 it has elected two county councillors, a mixture of Independent and Labour Party representatives.

Fourteen community councillors are elected or co-opted to serve on Coedpoeth Community Council, the lowest tier of local government.

== Economy ==
Traditional modes of employment included the areas many coal mines, lead mining and smelting at Minera Lead Mines and the Smelt, and quarrying, in the nearby Penygelli, Berwig, and Minera quarries, all served directly by local railways. The late 20th century saw a decline in the area's traditional industries, and all have now disappeared. Today Coedpoeth is a dormitory village for commuters to Wrexham, and a point of sale for goods used by local farms and hamlets. There are still many small businesses in the village centre along the high street, but these small shops face fierce competition from large chain stores in Wrexham.

== Lead and coal mining ==
The village was surrounded by natural resources such as lime, iron ore, coal, and lead, and many ruins show the industrial past of the area. The earliest industry was lead smelting and an area of the village named "The Smelt" contains street names referencing the industry.

Coal mining in Coedpoeth is documented from the early 15th century. Limited and shallow extraction took place throughout the 18th and 19th centuries, especially for the local iron industry. Examples include Earl Grosvenor's quarry of 1790 near Five-Crosses (reputedly 120 feet deep), the Jockey Mine near the back of the Methodist Church in The Smelt (closed 1869), and the New Grosvenor Mine near Coedpoeth railway station (1869-1884). In a celebratory dinner to mark the commercial opening of the Plas Power colliery in 1880, a speaker compared the newly equipped colliery with those 120 years earlier. These early collieries used a 'whimsey', powered by a horse, to lift coal to the surface. It was sorted by hand, and as it was before railways the delivery of the coal relied on carters. The collieries had agents that were funded to visit public houses and treat the carters so as to persuade them to carry coal from specific collieries. The state of the roads (or lack of them) was said to lead to the practice of stockpiling coal in the winter and shipping it in the summer.

A number of colliery waste tips survive in the Coedpoeth area, now grown over, and the remains of shallow workings and bell pits are relatively common in some areas, with scheduled examples near Nant Mill. Early ordnance survey maps from 1872 to the end of the 19th century show several old shafts to the North and West of Coedpoeth, and one location in that area is marked as 'Old Talwrn Colliery'. This appears to be otherwise known as Pentre'r-fron colliery, and was closed after a flooding event in 1819 which resulted in two lives lost and one remarkable survival. John Evans survived for 12 days trapped in darkness in a cavity in the roofspace, eating candles and drinking water dripping from the roof above. To the east of this the (newer) Talwrn Colliery was in production from at least the 1850s, and was amalgamated with the Vron Colliery in 1879 to which it was then linked by a rope-hauled incline. The two collieries later joined underground and from 1888 the Talwrn colliery site was no longer used for raising coal, but to provide forced ventilation for the mine. In addition to coal the Vron Colliery produced a considerable quantity of ironstone, which was used in Brymbo.

Vron Colliery had a 50% share in the new Plas Power colliery on which work started in 1875 (the location of which became known as Southsea). The owner of the other share, Mr Henry Robertson, bought out Vron Colliery's share in February 1878, and Vron Colliery used this money to fund their purchase of Talwrn Colliery. Plas Power colliery was opened for commercial production in 1880, and a year later the company was renamed as the Broughton and Plas Power Coal Company. Vron Colliery closed in 1930, and the Plas Power colliery closed in 1938. There are no standing remains of the coal mining industry that once flourished in Coedpoeth, though several buildings remain at the nearby site of the Plas Power colliery.

== Transport ==
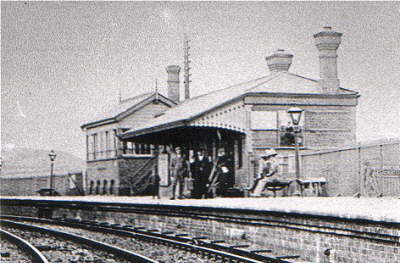
Coedpoeth Station, 1900

=== Rail ===
The village once had its own railway station on the Wrexham and Minera Railway of the Great Western Railway — albeit in name only as it was sited in the parish of Minera. A campaign was launched in 1905 by the business people of Coedpoeth to have a branch line laid from the station to the village centre, one mile distant. Local businesses claimed the station's location was of little benefit to them. The Great Western Railway company did not agree, and the campaign was abandoned in 1906. In 1914, the original station buildings were destroyed in a fire set by militant suffragettes.

Originally offering through services to two further halts on the line, at Vicarage halt, serving western Minera, and at Berwig Halt, the station was a passenger terminus from 1926 until passenger services were withdrawn from 1930. Heavy goods use of the line by Berwig Quarry and Minera Limeworks continued until closure of the line in 1970, after the limeworks was reduced to a base for road aggregates and was served by road.

=== Buses ===
Bus services first came to the village in the 1920s: they were first provided by the local government's Wrexham & District Transport Co. Ltd bus service from Wrexham, and followed by Great Western Railway's own bus services.

Richard Johnson of Southsea started operating a pony-and-trap service between Talwrn (Coedpoeth), Southsea and Wrexham in the 1890s, turning this into a motorised wagonette service in 1899 and then a ford Model T lorry-bus in 1916. In 1928 this service was consolidated with other bus services operated by Johnson's sons, following which a bus service from Talwrn via Southsea to Wrexham was operated by a partnership known as Richard Johnson & Sons ("Johnson's Buses") from 1928 until the operation - but no vehicles - was sold to Crosville on 22 October 1961.

Eventually Crosville Motor Services expanded into the area, and remained until Arriva North West & Wales came to manage all of their services, vehicles and depot in the area.

Today, the village is linked to Wrexham by two bus services, one run by Arriva Buses Wales and another by D Jones and Son; also GHA Coaches used to provide a night time service, as well as all routes through the village going on to Ruthin and Denbigh, which now also stop along the high street. George Edwards and Son used to provide a daytime service, but in late 2008 they sold their service routes to D Jones and Son.

=== Historic ford at Nant Mill ===
An old ford crossing exists on Wood Cottage Lane, near Nant Mill in the Clywedog valley. This shallow river crossing, used to serve as an important passage for farmers during the 19th and early 20th centuries. Though largely forgotten today, the ford remains visible and provides a rare surviving example of historic rural transport infrastructure in the area.

== Education ==
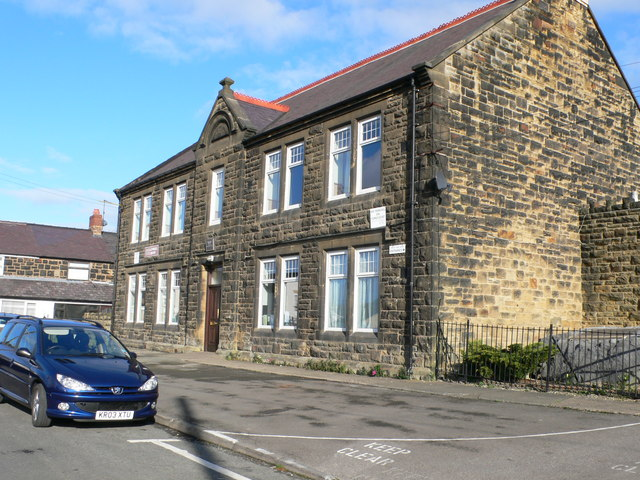
Coedpoeth Old Carnegie Library

Coedpoeth has two schools: Ysgol Penygelli and Ysgol Bryn Tabor (a Welsh-medium school). Originally one school in a Victorian building located to the north of the A525, Ysgol Penygelli was split into an infants school incorporating a nursery year and years 1–2, and a junior school, for years 3–6. The junior school is a feeder for the secondary school Ysgol Clywedog, in nearby Wrexham. Ysgol Bryn Tabor shared the same complex as Penygelli Infants to the south of the A525, which was part early 20th-century, with a large 1980s extension. Originally the local LEA planned to refurbish the original building on the north side of the road, but after a fire which destroyed the wooden beams supporting the original Welsh Slate roof, this building was demolished and materials reclaimed for an affordable housing scheme on the site. As a result, a new school complex was built and opened in July 2006, on the playing fields of the newer school, and Penygelli Infants and Penygelli Juniors are now one school again. Ysgol Bryn Tabor then expanded into the old Penygelli Infants site. The old junior school building was left vacant until demolition during March 2007. The site was then used for a new community centre and hall, named Plas Pentwyn. Pentwyn was the name of a farm that once stood nearby, belonging to the Powell family.

The original local library was a Carnegie Library built in 1904 as Coedpoeth Free Library. It cost £1,500 at the time, all of which was donated by Andrew Carnegie, the Scottish-American steel magnate. It was built in the same local sandstone as other buildings in the village, from quarries nearby, and stands opposite the villages memorial park and bowling greens. When opened, the ground floor featured a billiard table in a games room, as well as a refreshments room, with the rear of the building used for meetings of the local parish government. The reading room, which could also be used as a lecture room, was on the first floor. As the library was modernised, it was moved to the large games room on the ground floor, and the rest of the building became the community council headquarters.

As use of the old library increased, it became crowded, and the facilities were deemed inadequate. When Plas Pentwyn was constructed, room for a new library was provided, leaving the sole purpose for the old Carnegie Library as the headquarters for Coedpoeth Community Council, which has had a growing role in recent years.

== Notable people ==
- The missionary Gwenfron Moss was born here in 1898.
- Olympic champion rower Tom James grew up in the village.
- Actor Ricky Tomlinson previously lived here.
- Writer Grahame Davies was born and brought up here.
- Wrexham AFC footballer (2020-2025) Jordan Davies is from the village.
- George Clark, an eminent builder, lived at Penygelli Hall c. 1870. He built the Church at Bersham (aka Plas Power Chapel), and was reported to have built or renovated Denbigh Church, Llanfair Church at Ruthin, Bangor Canonry, and Henllan and Rossett vicarages. Clark was also a quarrymaster and operated the Penygelli quarry from the late 1860s until the business was sold in 1874.

== Football ==
The first football club in Coedpoeth was Lloftwen who there are reports of in January 1878. The next club in the village was Equitable who formed around 1880, and folded around 1884. Equitable entered the Welsh Cup in 1881. A club called Coedpoeth also existed at the same time who competed in the Welsh Cup from 1882 to 1884.

In 1884 there are reports of a team called White Stars (Coedpoeth), whilst in 1887 there is reports of a team called North End (Coedpoeth) who played at a ground called The Terrace.

The short lived Minera Rovers and Minera Victoria contested the Welsh Amateur Cup in 1890 and 1891. By 1892 Adwy United had emerged to represent the area. Adwy United reached the Semi Final of Welsh Amateur Cup in 1895. By 1898 they were joined in the Denbighshire League by another local team, Minera St Marys. Minera St Marys only lasted one season in this competition, taking on the fixtures of Cerney Swifts and finishing second from bottom.

Adwy United were more competitive in the Denbighshire League, finishing third in 1899. They also won the St Martins Cup beating St Martins 5–0 at The Racecourse, Wrexham. Adwy United withdrew from the Denbighshire League in 1900 and merged with Coedpoeth Victoria to form Adwy Victoria. This team finished second in the Denbighshire League in 1901.

Coedpoeth United were first mentioned in 1907 when they joined the Wrexham & District League. They finished second in the Second Division and were promoted to the First Division for the 1908–09 season where they finished third. The 1908–09 season also saw the introduction of a Coedpoeth United Reserves team in the Second Division, who were joined in the league by another team from the village, Coedpoeth St Davids. In 1909 the team also reached the final of the Denbighshire & Flintshire Charity Cup, and St Martins Cup. Coedpoeth United withdrew from the Wrexham & District League in 1910.

Following the end of hostilities Coedpoeth United re-emerged in 1920 in the North Wales Alliance League Division 2, a competition in which they finished as Runners Up, only missing out on being Champions on goals scored. From 1921 to 1924 Coedpoeth entered the newly formed Welsh National League (North). Between 1935 and 1938 the club competed in the Wrexham & District League.

Following the end of World War II, Coedpoeth re-emerged in the newly formed Welsh National League Wrexham Area East. They were Champions of the East Division in 1948 and 1949. The 1949 League winning team had a 100% record, and was promoted to Welsh National League Wrexham Area Division 1. The club stayed in Division 1 for two seasons, before being relegated in 1951. The club finished as Runners Up in Division 2 in 1953 achieving Promotion back to Division 1. The team was immediately relegated again, and played a final season in Division 2 before folding at the end of the 1955 season.

In 1964 almost a decade after the previous Coedpoeth team had folded, Coedpoeth Sports Club entered Welsh National League Wrexham Area Division 3. Coedpoeth SC were immediately successful and were Champions in their first season gaining Promotion to Division 2. Their stay in Division 2 lasted two seasons as in 1967 they were Champions and Promoted again. The club lasted 5 seasons in Division 1 before finishing 15th in 1972 and dropping two leagues back to Division 3. The club initially struggled back in Division 3, however in 1974 Coedpoeth SC were Champions and promoted. 1976 saw the club complete a League and Cup double as they won Division 2 alongside the Horace Wynne Cup. The club finished 10th back in Division 1, however folded in 1977 after being knocked out of the Welsh Cup in the Qualifying Round.

Coedpoeth once again reformed for the start of the 1980–81 season and finished Second in Welsh National League Wrexham Area Division 4 however were not Promoted. The following the season the club went one better and were Champions of the Division 4. This marked the beginning of an astonishing rise, as the club claimed the Division 3 title at its first attempt, and finished as Division 2 Runners Up straight away too. The club finished 13th in its first season in Division 1 and was subsequently relegated. The club remained in Division 2 before folding in 1989.

The current adult section of the club reformed in 1999 and joined the Welsh National League.
