= Esclusham =

Community in Wrexham County Borough, Wales

Coordinates: 53.03378°N 3.0669°W

- Community
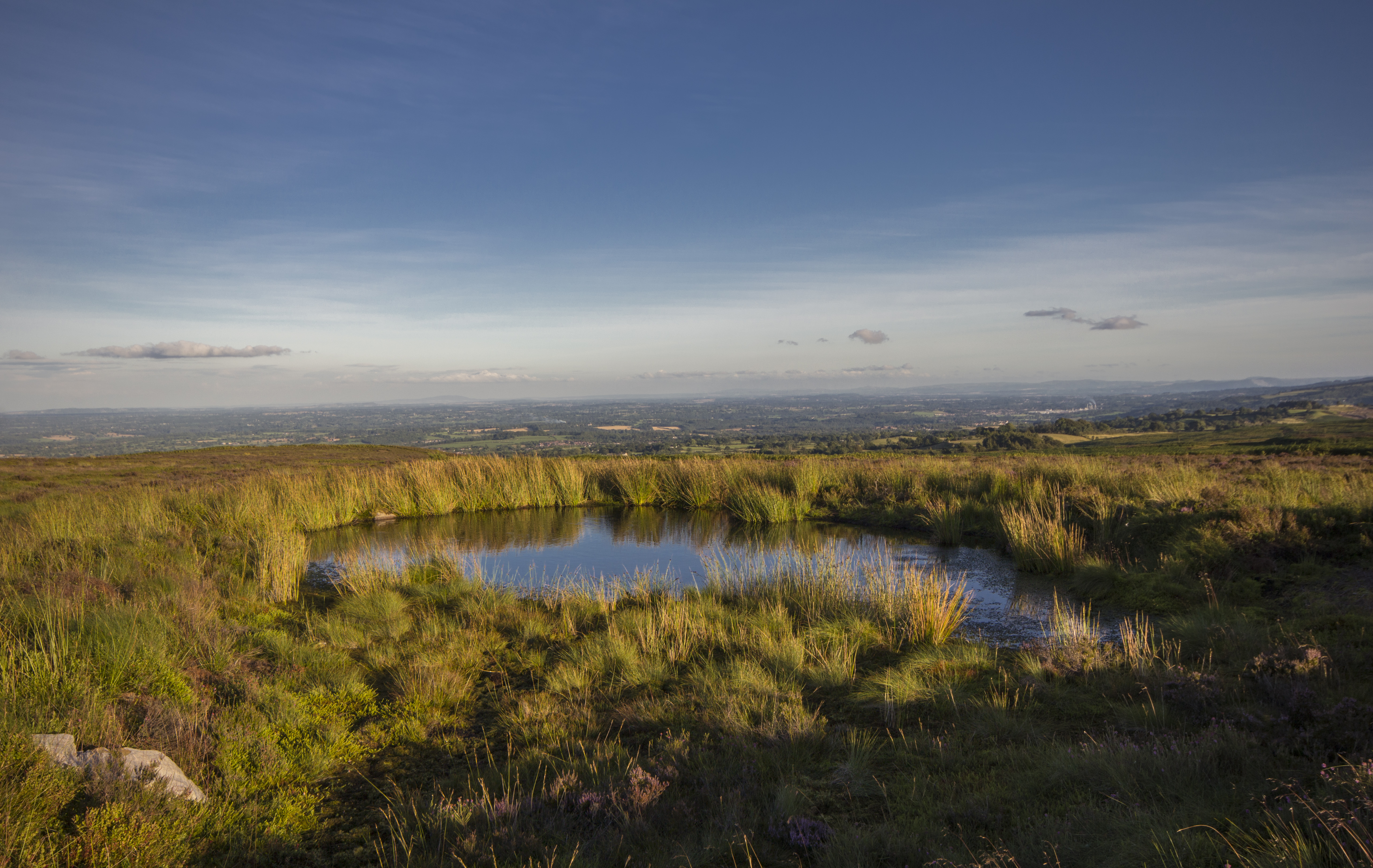
- Overlooking Esclusham from a mountain pool on the Fron-deg Flat
- Principal area: Wrexham
- Country: Wales
- Sovereign state: United Kingdom
- Ambulance: Welsh
- List of places UK Wales

Esclusham (Welsh: Esclus or Esclys) is a community and electoral ward in Wrexham County Borough, Wales.

The community includes the villages of Bersham, Rhostyllen, Aberoer, Llwyneinion and Pentre Bychan, as well as a number of smaller settlements, the park at Erddig, and an area of the Ruabon Moors west of Aber-oer known as Esclusham Mountain. The population of the community at the 2011 Census was 3,515.

== History ==
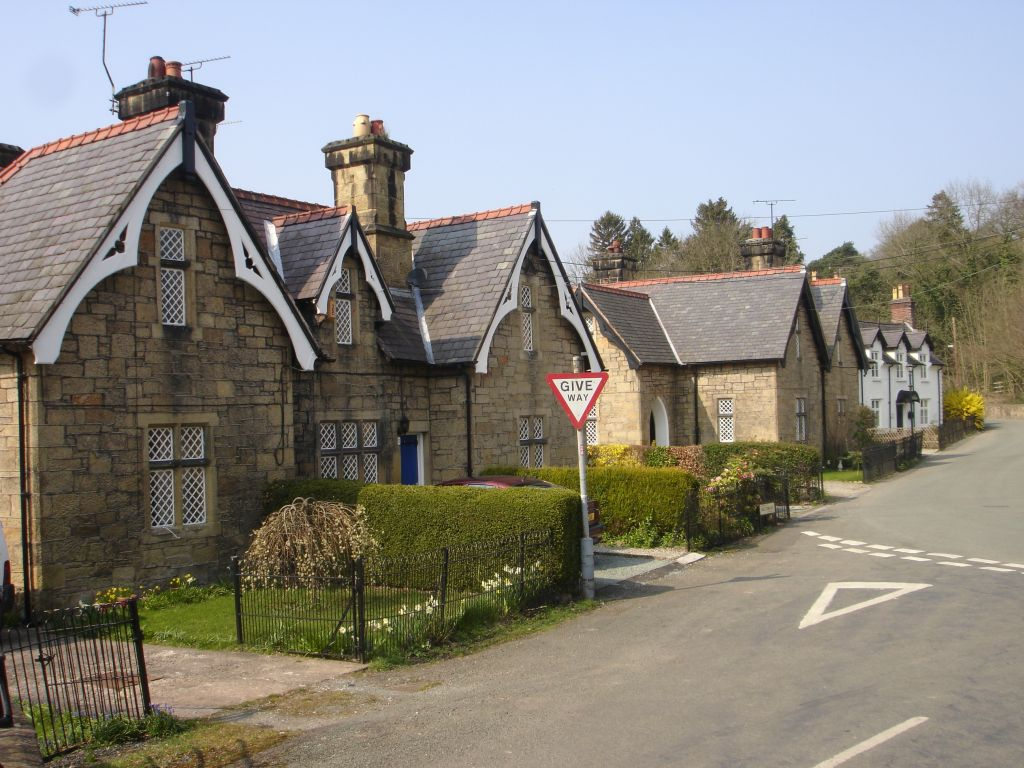
Cottages in Bersham.

The name is recorded as Esclesham or Esclusham as early as 1315, likely originating in a combination of the Old English personal name Æscel with ham, "settlement"; the name is locally pronounced with stress on the second (middle) syllable, probably due to the influence of Welsh language stress patterns.

The old township of Esclusham, within the manor of Esclusham, was part of the historic Marcher Lordship of Bromfield and Yale. The Survey of topographer John Norden, carried out in 1620 within Bromfield and Yale, defined the township as follows:

[...] the towneshipp of Esclusham, beeing part of ye said manno', is bounden from Minera by a little purle of water running from the mountayne called Glas-bry, downe by the landes called Tir Kelin, and so to Clywedog vpon ye west by the landes of Hugh ap Robert ap Howell in ye manno' of Minera, and part of Glasbrie, and part of ye mountayne towardes y Groes Newydd; but the certaine boundes vpon ye said mountayne they cannot sett downe. And from Mortyn Wallicoru' by a brooke called Holbrooke, through certaine feildes with certaine markes knowne, to a place called Aberderryn, and from thence to a place called Penissa Maeswdd Kynelleth to a brooke called yr Avon Ddu; and from Morton Anglicoru' the said Avon Ddu doth bounde to ye towneshipp of Erddig, and from thence to Clywedoge, ioyning to ye towneshippe of Bersham in ye said manno'.

The jurors noted that "vpon ye mountaynes and commons in and about this manno' do breed moore cockes and growes, w'ch gentlemen of ye countrey of Chesshire and other places do hawke and take them at some seasons of the yeare".

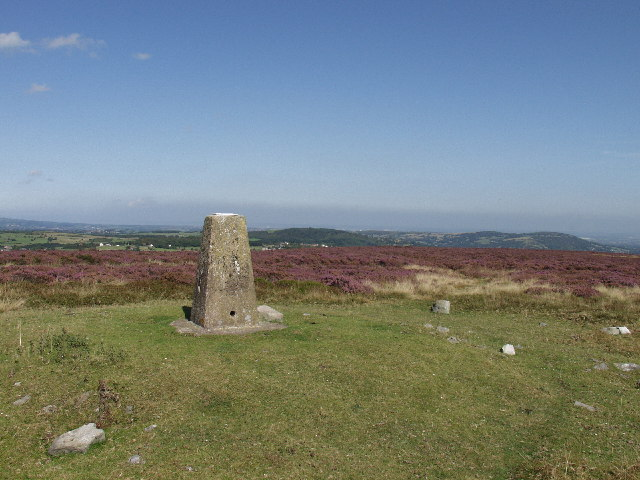
Trig point on Esclusham Mountain, looking towards Bwlchgwyn and Nant-y-Ffrith.

The township of Esclusham Above (i.e. "above" Offa's Dyke) was incorporated in the parish of Minera from 1844; in 1879 parts of Esclusham Above, Esclusham Below, and Erddig were incorporated in the civil parish of Esclusham. As a result of the Local Government Act 1972, this was itself replaced in 1974 by the Community of Esclusham, currently based in the Parish Hall, Rhostyllen.

== Governance ==
An electoral ward in the same name exists. The population of this ward at the 2011 census was 2,766 only.

== Features ==
The community has a total area of 1656 hectares and had 3401 inhabitants at the 2001 census. Its eastern part is relatively urbanised, with the village of Rhostyllen being close to the suburbs of Wrexham. In the western, rural part of the community the land rises to the high pastureland and moorland above Fron-deg and Aber-oer known as Esclusham Mountain.

Until the early 20th century there were lead and zinc mines on the mountain, and the area was used for grouse shooting. There are several structures of interest in industrial archeology, including the Bersham Ironworks and old lead workings. The Minera Caves, a Site of Special Scientific Interest, lie beneath Esclusham Mountain: over 8 kilometres of caves connecting with the old lead workings have now been mapped.

Bersham Colliery was a large coal mine in Rhostyllen which employed over 1000 men at its height in 1958.
