= Clywedog Trail =

Footpath in Wrexham, Wales

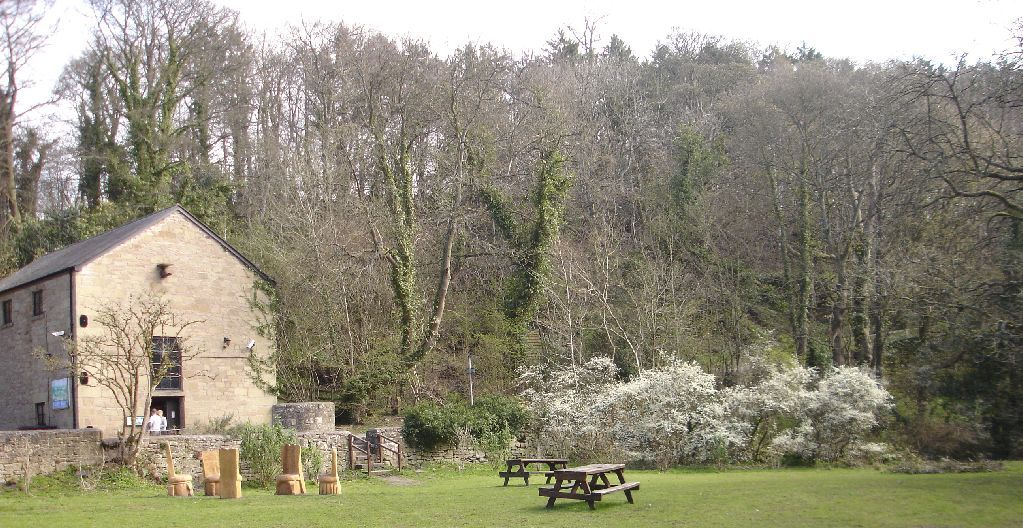
Nant Mill, in Coedpoeth near Wrexham

The Clywedog Trail is a 9-mile (14 km) footpath close to Wrexham in Wales. Starting at the Minera Lead Mines (53.0512°N 3.0811°W) and running to King's Mills (53.0358°N 2.9750°W), it follows the course of the River Clywedog. It is a haven for walking, relaxation and enjoying the peace of the wildlife. The Clywedog region played a role in the Industrial Revolution; ironmaking began in 1670, smelting iron ore with coke began in 1721 and John Wilkinson set up shop in 1761. For many years the area was one of the most important iron manufacturing centres in the world.

== Sights ==
Sights passed include:

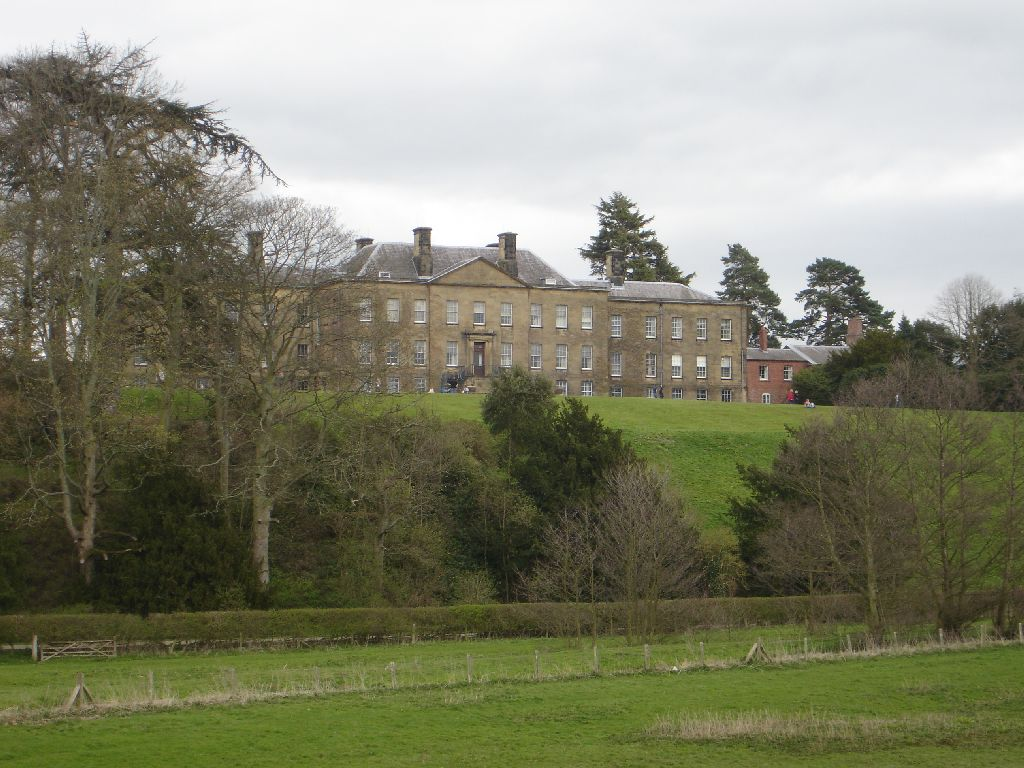
Erddig Hall, nr. Wrexham

- Minera Lead Mines
- Nant Mill
- Plas Power Church
- Offa's Dyke and Plas Power Woods
- Bersham Ironworks
- Bersham
- Erddig
- King's Mills

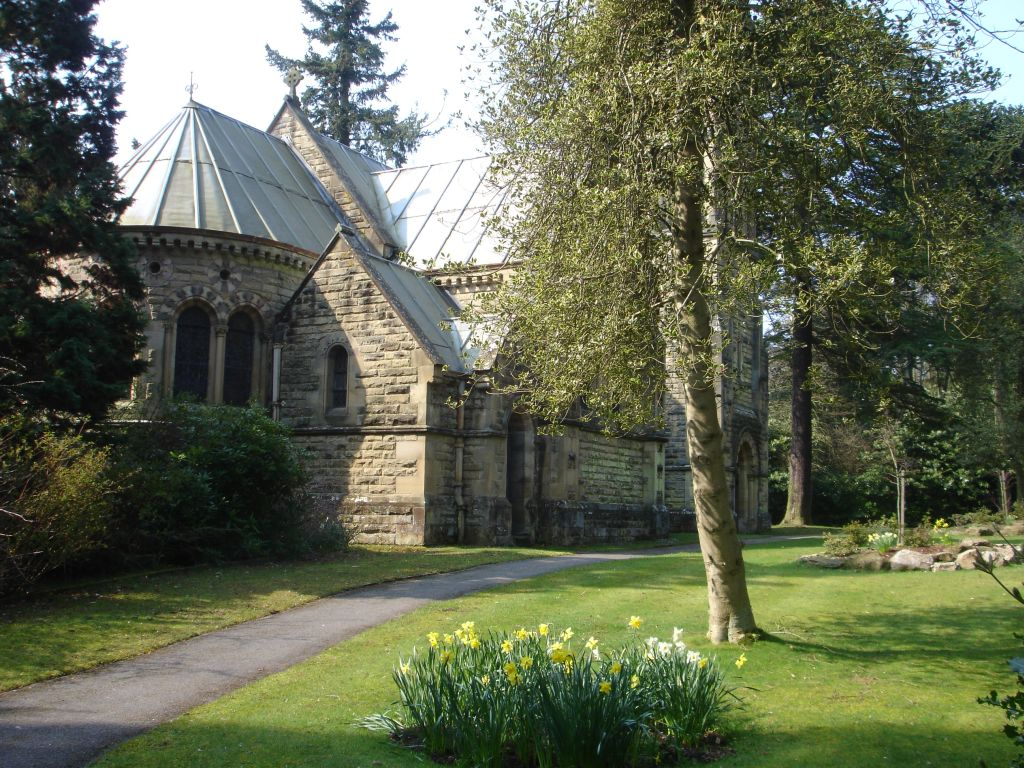
Plas Power Church in Bersham can be seen from the Clywedog Trail
