= New Brighton, Wrexham =

Hamlet in Minera, Wrexham, Wales

Coordinates: 53.04997°N 3.08489°W

New Brighton
- Hamlet
- Location within Wrexham
- OS grid reference: SJ264513
- Community: Minera
- Principal area: Wrexham
- Preserved county: Clwyd
- Country: Wales
- Sovereign state: United Kingdom
- Post town: MINERA
- Postcode district: LL11
- Police: North Wales
- Fire: North Wales
- Ambulance: Welsh
- UK Parliament: Clwyd South
- Senedd Cymru – Welsh Parliament: Clwyd South

New Brighton is a small hamlet near Minera, in north-east Wales.

== Background ==
This part of Minera parish was originally known as 'City Land', and was bequeathed by Owen Jones (died 1659), a butcher of Chester, to 'the poor of every Company of Merchants and Craftsmen in the City of Chester'. The area was steeply sloping agricultural land until the mid 18th century when a trustee of the charity, Alderman Richardson, encouraged prospecting for lead ore that was so successful that between 1761 and 1781 some £13,000 were paid to the charity in royalties.

In 1868 49 freehold building plots 'in the midst of the celebrated lead-mine district' were put up for auction by the Owen Jones' Charity at the nearby City Arms Hotel, Minera. The name change to New Brighton appears to have occurred about this time as from 1869 buildings auctioned in that area began stating their location as New Brighton, Minera. There were a number of public houses in the area from about 1870, including the White Lion Inn (of City Land, Minera), the New Brighton Inn (also of City Land, Minera), and the Rock Tavern - which was described in a dispute over renewal of its licence in 1895 as 'nothing more than a shanty on the side of the mountain, for the express purpose of catching the miners as they went home' - the licence was renewed on the basis that it was originally granted before 1869, which narrowed the options for refusing it. While these appear to have closed around the time the lead mining ceased, the City Arms continued in business, providing a link to the original name of the hamlet, until it closed in 2006.

New Brighton had a Hermon Welsh Methodist Chapel (a Wesleyan chapel) which was built in 1890 of corrugated iron. The building survives but is no longer used as a chapel. The Welsh Independent Chapel built nearby at The Wern in 1805 was closed in 1975 and since demolished (thought the graveyard survives). The chapel's records of deaths and baptisms survive (in the Bangor University Library) and contain the names and occupations of many from City Lands/New Brighton.

These days New Brighton is a quiet residential area immediately up-slope from the car park and visitor centre for the Minera Lead Mines Country Park. It has 5 listed buildings, all good examples of late 19th century workers' buildings associated with the lead mines. The former railway route that served the lead mines, and later the silica quarry, ran along the lower boundary of New Brighton, and is now a footpath that links the Minera Lead Mines Country Park to Minera Limeworks.
