= Minera Lead Mines =

Country park and former mine in Wrexham County Borough, Wales

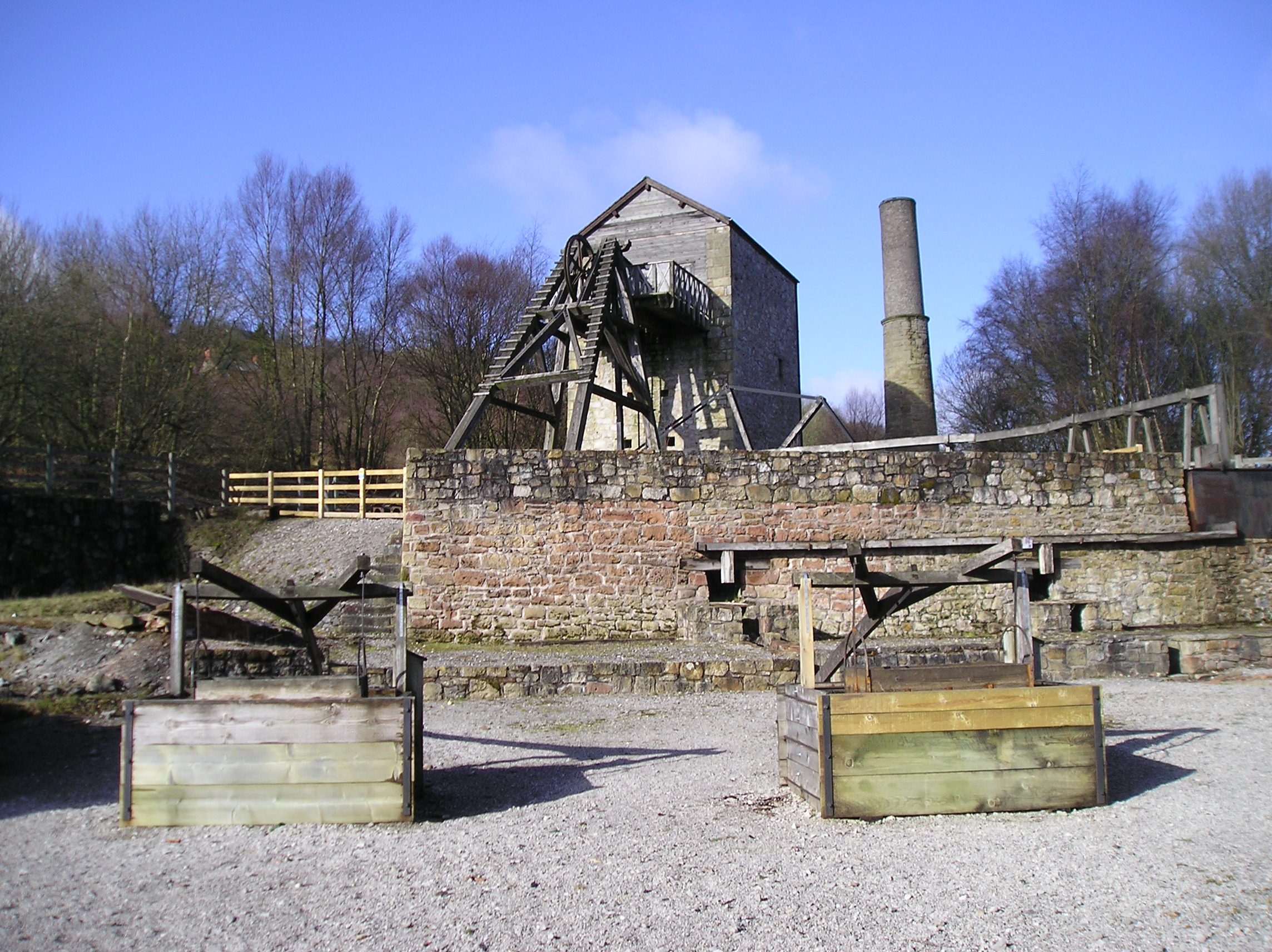
- The former Meadow Shaft in 2022
- Interactive map of Minera Lead Mines
- Location: Minera (Near Wrexham), Wales; 53.0507582°N 3.0823232°W
- Products: Lead, Zinc
- Opened: 1845
- Active: 1845–1914
- Closed: 1914
- Company: Minera Mining Company

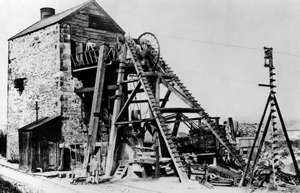
Meadow Shaft of Minera Lead Mines in 1893.

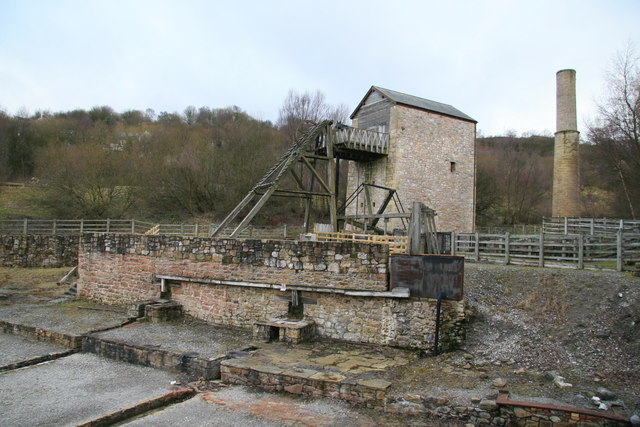
The restored engine house and workings.

The township of Minera, near Wrexham, in North-East Wales was a major centre of lead mining for centuries, reaching its peak of production in the 1860s. Mining finished in 1914, but buried under the spoil in one area was discovered the processing equipment associated with the Meadow shaft (one of the last to operate). With this as a display at its core and with the spoil tips being returned to nature, the area has now become a country park and tourist centre called the Minera Lead Mines and Country Park.

== History ==
Lead mining at Minera is thought to date back to the Roman period, though no archaeological evidence has been found to prove this. The first written record of lead mining at Minera dates back to 1296, when Edward I of England hired miners from the site to work in his new mines in Devon. Not all of them vacated the area, however, as mining went on until the Black Death in 1349, when it ended. It is not clear when lead mining resumed in Minera. Mining would be limited by the water levels, which could be lowered by creation of adits, and from the late 18th century by the use of steam pumping engines.

There were multiple main lead veins, each with their own name, many companies formed, some very short-lived, and about 100 mine shafts, many of which were also named, but to describe the mining it is easiest to divide it into three areas :

- The Eisteddfod Mines - an area of lead mining to the North of the Minera Limestone Quarry
- The Mountain Mines - On Minera Mountain to the South of the Minera Limestone Quarry
- The "Old Minera Mines" on the West side of the Clywedog river valley stretching from the Minera Limestone Quarry to the City Lands (now called New Brighton)

The Eisteddfod mines may be the site of some of the earliest workings, as there is extensive evidence of shallow surface workings as well as later deeper mines. Records of the companies operating before the 19th century are fragmentory, but in the 1860s where records exist there were many companies, formed and merged. One of the last was The Consolidated Minera Lead Mining Company which was formed in 1875 by merging "Central Minera", "Cae Pant", "Twelve Apostles", and "Ragman" Lead Mines. The Hush Eisteddfod Lead Mining company was formed in 1876, and may have merged with the Consolidated Minera Lead Mining Company after that was forced to sell much of its plant. Hush Eisteddfod submitted mining returns in 1881 and 1882, but when it ceased to operate in 1886 it marked the end of the Eisteddfod mines.

The Mountain mines appear to have been active from the 1820s and like the Eisteddfod area there were several companies and mergers, with the Minera Mountain Lead Mining Company being formed in 1885 as fortunes declined, to amalgamate the former operations of "The Park”, “South Minera”, “Pool Park”, “Lower Pool Park” and “Mid Park” mines. The company was wound up in 1891, and while there were attempts to restart mining, they seem to have failed.

The third area is called the "Old Minera Mines" in an account from 1870. This states that the mines were worked from 1720 to 1824 when work ceased due to the problem of water. John Wilkinson (the ironmaster from Bersham and later Brymbo) was a partner in the Maesffynnon mine near the lime works, from 1783 and installed a steam pumping engine in 1784. A second pumping engine was added in 1799, and a third later, but the cost of pumping made mining at the Western end of the "Old Minera Mines" uneconomic by 1817. At the Eastern end similar problems lead to closure of the mines in 1824. One of the problems was that the water that caused so much problems flowed between mines, so the installation of a pumping engine by one company could end up pumping water from another. Mining restarted here when John Taylor & Sons (a large international mining company originating in Cornwall) formed the Minera Mining Company in 1848. An extensive investment resulted in a new drainage adit from near Nant Mill (a distance of 1711 yards) completed in 1852, new steam engines for winding and pumping, including a large Cornish pumping engine to raise water to the level of the adit 108 yards below the surface (the engine had an 80inch cylinder and was made by Harvey's of Hayle), and the laying of a railway branch from Minera Lime Works. With the water controlled, further exploration was possible and significant veins of lead ore were discovered. The Lead Mines Country Park is close to Meadow's shaft, and a walk along the railway trackbed soon passes the site of Taylor's shaft, both about 300 to 400 metres deep. In 1870 there were 14 shafts along the course of the rail branch. The last new mine was the furthest East, and the shaft was sunk in 1888 by the New Minera Mining Company. Although productive in 1893, by 1894 they made a loss, and in 1897 they merged with the long established Minera Mining Company to form the United Minera Mining Company.

John Taylor & Sons had used a £30,000 investment by 1851 to restart the mines, yet the profits for 1864 alone were £60,000 (equivalent to over £4 Million in 2008). By 1900, the price of lead and zinc had fallen dramatically, while the price of coal used for the steam engines rose. In 1908 the United Minera Mining Company announced that the mines were no longer economic, and the pumps would be turned off leading to progressive flooding of the workings over the next 2 years. The mines were worked until the rising waters shut them, and all the assets were sold by 1914.

== Transport ==
For transport, the Minera Mining Company had their own railway branch line completed by 1851, which connected with the end of the Wrexham and Minera Branch at Minera Limeworks. The mines also had their own steam locomotive to work the branch, the last one being a Manning Wardle 0-6-0ST (Works No. 21 built 1861) Henrietta. The lead ore would be taken to Wrexham for transport nationally, and coal brought back. The line was lifted in 1914 when the mines closed, but was relaid again in 1932 to serve two silica clay pits (Graig Fawr quarry and Tir Celyn quarry) which were run by the newly formed Minera Silica Quarries Limited from 1926. The 'Minera Mineral Branch' appears in a 1947 list of GWR lines, so would have become a British Rail line in 1948. The track was lifted for the last time in 1962, after Tir Celyn quarry changed to road transport (Graig Fawr quarry closed in the 1930s).

Plans to build a tourist narrow gauge railway on the trackbed from the lead mines towards the Minera Limeworks were in the 1990 development plan, but were not progressed. Minera Quarry was still in use at the time (it closed in 1994). The Minera Quarry Trust was formed in 2005 to promote the use of the quarry for the local community, and in 2017 the quarry came under the ownership of the North Wales Wildlife Trust who purchased it from Tarmac. The quarry was formally opened to the public in June 2018.

== Restoration ==
The workings and local area underwent massive restoration and regeneration funded by Wrexham County Borough Council and the Welsh Development Agency beginning in 1988 to make sure the lead, Zinc and lime spoil tips didn't contaminate local water supplies, a second phase focussed around the Meadows engine house started in 1990. The Engine house was rebuilt and fitted with replica machinery, as the original steam engine was removed in 1914. A visitor Centre was opened for public use, and the engine house is part of a tour. It is a site of tourism for Wrexham County Borough Council.

In 2004, the site was attacked by vandals, but this was repaired by the council in 2005. By 2024 much of the heavy replica woodwork supporting the winding gear had become rotten and dangerous, and so it was removed.

== Sources ==
- Minera Lead Mines – official museum site
- The Story of Minera Lead Mines – Wrexham County Borough Council
