= Bwlchgwyn =

Village in Wales

Coordinates: 53.072°N 3.098°W

Bwlchgwyn: Welsh: Bwlch-gwyn
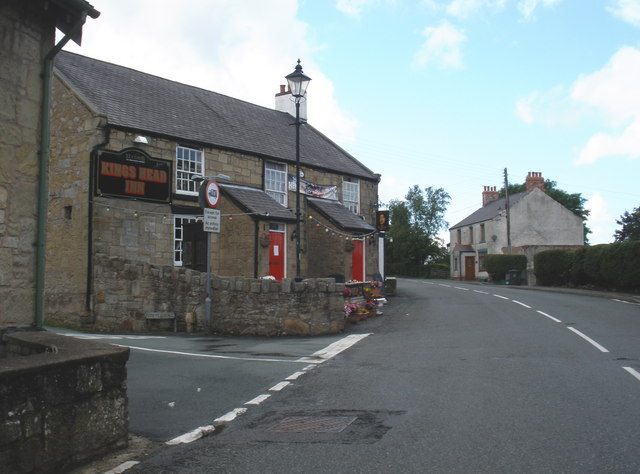
- Pub on the A525 road through Bwlchgwyn

- Location within Wrexham
- Population: 855 (2011)
- OS grid reference: SJ264533
- Community: Brymbo
- Principal area: Wrexham
- Preserved county: Clwyd
- Country: Wales
- Sovereign state: United Kingdom
- Post town: WREXHAM
- Postcode district: LL11
- Dialling code: 01978
- Police: North Wales
- Fire: North Wales
- Ambulance: Welsh
- UK Parliament: Wrexham
- Senedd Cymru – Welsh Parliament: Clwyd South

Bwlchgwyn (Welsh: Bwlch-gwyn) is a village in Wrexham County Borough, Wales, on the A525 road, 5 miles (8 km) west of the city of Wrexham and 10 miles (16 km) south-east of the town of Ruthin. Bwlchgwyn is part of the community of Brymbo. In the 2011 Census the population of the village was 855.

== Etymology ==
The placename Bwlchgwyn has in the past been translated into English as "White Pass", perhaps referring to the white limestone cliffs in the area. These limestone outcrops were more prominent, in the north of the village on the high ground of Fronheulog and over to Gwynfryn, before the days of quarrying. It has also been suggested that the original name was Bwlchgwynt; gwynt meaning wind. The translation "pass", however, does not entirely fit with the Welsh word bwlch in its usual usage in placenames across Wales. Meaning hollow, dip, gap, aperture or notch, when bwlch is used elsewhere in Wales, it is used as a prefix in a word describing a steep ravine. Other examples are Bwlch-y-Saethau, Bwlch Tryfan, Bwlch Main and Bwlch Eryl Farchog; all such cases are characterised by very steep-sided ravines. Bwlchgwyn has, at its edge, a deep-sided ravine Nant-y-Ffrith, a prominent geographical feature. Before the forestry commission days, the farming community of Bwlchgwyn included many parts of the steep valley.

One suggestion of the gwyn in Bwlchgwyn, meaning "white", points to the area being the first and last place in the district where snow settles. Similarly, nearby Gwynfryn literally means "white hill". Gwyn, literally white, can in Welsh be used to suggest something being fair or beautiful. Gwyn is also used where there are river rapids or waterfalls, therefore 'gwyn', it has been suggested could point to the 'ravine's' (Nant-y-Ffrith) many waterfalls.

The young organisers of the Bwlchgwyn Eisteddfod in 1903 referred to themselves as "'Gwyr Ieuainc y Bwlch" (the young men of the ravine), proudly associating themselves with this prominent feature.

== Geography ==
At a height of 1,090 feet (333 m) above sea level, it claimed to be the highest village in Wales until December 2015, when it was discovered that Trefil in Blaenau Gwent is actually the highest by the Ordnance Survey. As such, the village will now be removing the signs claiming to be the highest village. As the village is so high, there is a good view of the Peak district, Frodsham Hill and the Cheshire Plain; with Jodrell Bank being seen on clear days.

Two rivers have their sources near the village: the River Gwenfro rises on the south side of the village and the Nant-y-Ffrith flows through a wooded valley to the north.

The village is built on Cefn-y-fedw sandstone, a type of Millstone Grit from the Carboniferous period. It contains veins of lead ore and various other minerals.

== History ==
Bwlchgwyn has been inhabited since at least the Bronze Age when a hill fort was built there (now destroyed by quarrying). It is thought that the original Brythonic inhabitants and later the Romans worked the shallow lead veins of the Eisteddfod, with the small fort possibly being a base for these operations. It has been suggested (by Ivan Margary, pioneering historian of Roman roads) that the old road up from Glascoed and along the ridge above Nant-y-Ffrith is of Roman origin: followed, from Bwlchgwyn, by today's main road, it runs to the hamlet near Llandegla called Pen-y-stryt (“the end of the road“) and then across the moors. Ancient hedgerows, dating from this period can also be found opposite George Edwards and son bus depot.

Until the 19th century the area was common land used for grazing with only a few houses. Under the Inclosures Act for the adjacent township of Minera in July 1809, the 'common called Bwlch Gwym' was subdivided into 5 parcels of land which were then sold at public auction. As with other villages in this area, such as Coedpoeth, Gwynfryn and Minera, the village prospered in the agricultural and Industrial Revolutions, benefiting from the rich deposit of silica underground. Local quarries and coal mines provided employment, and the village grew. The nearby Minera Limeworks was the largest employer in the area until it closed in the 1970s. In 1954 the 'Bwlchgwyn Silica Company', a subsidiary company run by three shareholding directors of the 'Oughtibridge Silica Firebrick Co, based near Sheffield, England, even proposed to purchase the entire land of Bwlchgwyn for mining purposes and force residents to move. Whilst quarrying parts of the village was given the go-ahead, including removing Bwchgwyn's iron age hillfort at the top of Frodheulog, as well as the village side of the local beauty spot, Nant-y-Ffrith, eradication of the entire village was stopped after campaigns by local villagers and a councillor, Mr. Hooker. The campaign went to all the way to the House of Lords, plans for the full eradication of the village was denied and the subsidiary company later ceased to operate.

Several public houses opened in the area, one of which still remains - The King's Head Inn, seen in the photograph above. Four chapels were built in the village: Capel Nebo, on the main Rhuthun Road in the centre. It was first built in 1852 and had a peak congregation of 150. Capel Bethel was Wesleyan (nicknamed Capel-y-Gat) and was built on the main road to the north of the village. Ffordd Wesley, a road at the top of the village ended by the chapel; hence the name. Capel Salem was a Calvinistic Methodist and was built on Brymbo road whilst Capel Peniel sat on the outskirts of the village on the Old Road/Henffordd. Bwlchgwyn School opened in 1875; the building stood for over 100 years before being replaced by a new school. The Welsh-language author Edward Tegla Davies was a pupil and later a teacher there and lived at Brynthonfa on Wesley Road. A gothic hall was situated on the top of Fronheulog in the late 19th and early 20th centuries; known as Fronheulog Hall. At one time it was girls' school and at another time a hotel, much famed for the restorative properties of the clear air. It was later demolished due to quarry work nearby, along with the iron age hillfort, carried out by the Silica Company.

== Bwlchgwyn today ==
Today the village has its own primary school, with secondary schooling in Wrexham. The bus company George Edwards and Son is based in Bwlchgwyn. It formerly operated the village bus service but now only runs coach trips. The main road through the village is the A525 between Newcastle-under-Lyme and Rhyl. This creates a high volume of traffic through the village, although this was calmed by road improvements to a parallel route going around the village.

There is a well-used community centre which is also home to the local toddler group, an indoor bowls club, WI, Craft Club, Scouts and Beavers. The community centre can be found inside the park, with outside play area with climbing frames and also includes two tennis courts which can be freely accessed by the public.

Recently, a Motor safari has been developed in the Silica quarry in Bwlchgwyn. Notably, attendees include Top Gear.
