= River Clywedog =

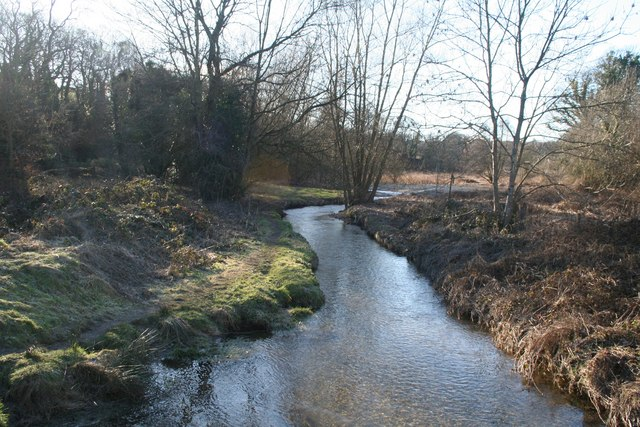
- The Clywedog near Bersham
- Etymology: Prob. derived from Welsh clywed, "to hear", clywedog meaning "noisy"
- Native name: Afon Clywedog (Welsh)

Location
- Sovereign state: United Kingdom
- Country: Wales
- Principal area: Wrexham County Borough
- Nearest city: Wrexham

Physical characteristics
- Source
  - location: near Gwynfryn, Wrexham County Borough
  - coordinates: 53°3′46.078″N 3°6′20.527″W
  - elevation: 320 m (1,050 ft)
- Mouth
  - location: confluence with River Dee, near Sutton, Isycoed, Wrexham County Borough
  - coordinates: 53°1′10.985″N 2°52′56.905″W
  - elevation: 14 m (46 ft)

Basin features
- Tributaries
  - left: Gwenfro

The River Clywedog is a river in Wrexham County Borough, Wales. Its uses have been watering crops, powering industrial machinery but is now used as walking trails or geography trips. The river originates to the west of Wrexham, and joins the River Dee some four miles south east of the city.

== Course of the river ==
The river Clywedog rises in the hills west of the village of Minera. After flowing through Minera it turns south-east, past Coedpoeth, Bersham and Rhostyllen and through the Erddig Country Park, then east, passing slightly to the south of Wrexham. There is a path along the entire river bank from Minera to Wrexham. After passing the Wrexham industrial estate, the river joins the River Dee near the English/Welsh border.

== History ==
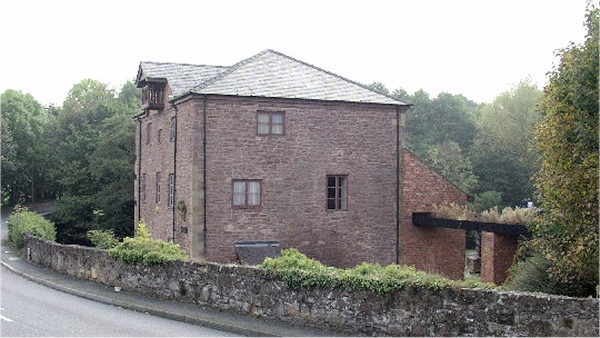
The King's Mill, in Abenbury, relied on water power from the Clywedog via a leat

During the 18th and early 19th centuries there were 17 watermills along the river: fulling mills for preparing cloth, mills for grinding corn and malt, and paper mills. Large waterwheels powered the bellows blasting air into the iron furnaces at Bersham, and drove winding and pumping machinery in the lead mines.

The population grew dramatically as the Industrial Revolution drew workers to the Wrexham area, serving the rapidly developing coal mines, lead mines, limestone quarries, ironworks and lead smelting works. The fertile Clywedog flood plain had always provided rich pasture and corn; but, to meet the increased demand for food for the expanding work force, new corn mills were built and additional areas of woodland were cleared for growing crops. When steam power took over in the late 19th and 20th centuries, new industries no longer needed to be sited close to the river. New technology and cheap imports led to a gradual industrial decline in the area.

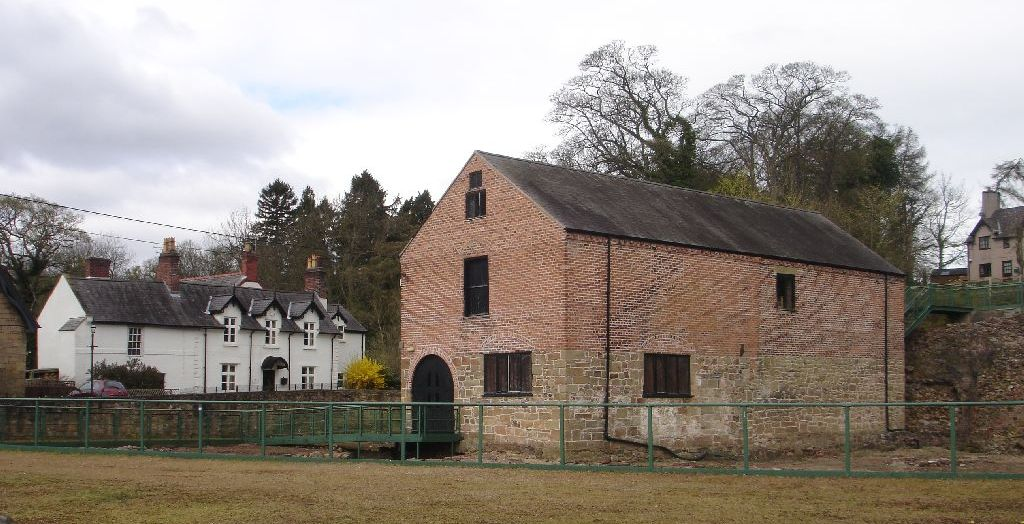
Bersham Ironworks also required water via a leat from the Clywedog to power the works, and later a mill

Today the Clywedog has returned to nature and is a place for wildlife, relaxation and walking. Several of the old buildings and surrounding land are now museums, visitor centres and riverside country parks: Minera Lead Mines, Nant Mill Visitor Centre and Picnic Area, Bersham Heritage Centre and Ironworks and Erddig.

There is now a 7-mile (11 km) trail along the river through a number of the old industrial sites. Known as the Clywedog Trail, its starts at the Minera Lead Mines and finishes at Kings Mills.
