= Ogof Dydd Byraf =

Cave near Wrexham, Wales

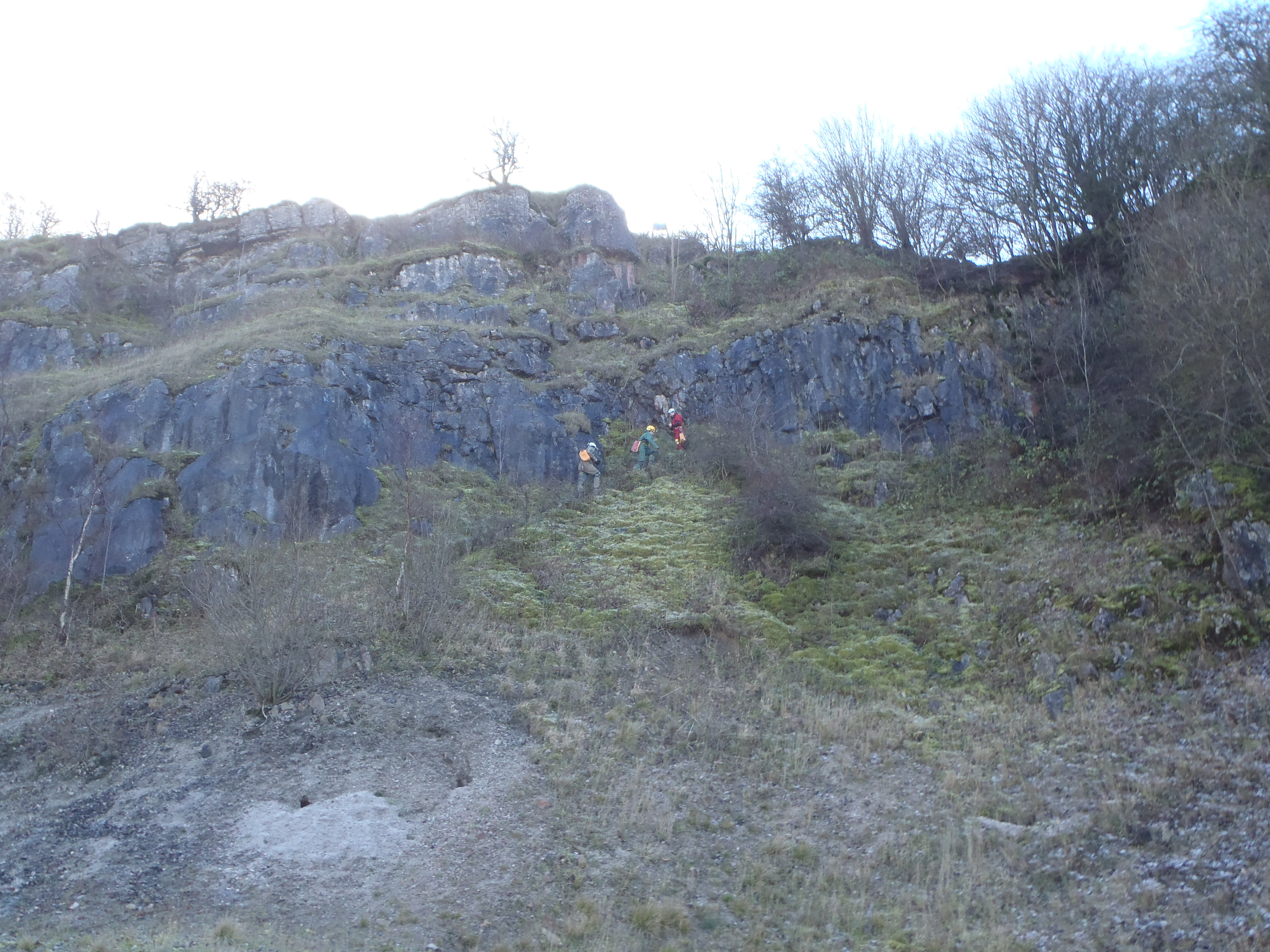
- Cavers climbing the side of Minera quarry to reach the entrance

- Location within Wrexham
- Location: Wrexham County Borough, Wales
- OS grid: SJ 2546 5201
- Coordinates: 53°03′37″N 3°06′49″W
- Length: 750 metres (2,460 ft)
- Elevation: 340 metres (1,120 ft)
- Discovery: 1964
- Geology: Limestone
- Access: contact North Wales Caving Club
- Translation: cave of the shortest day
- Registry: Cambrian Cave Registry

Ogof Dydd Byraf is a cave which extends under Esclusham Mountain in the north-east Wales from its entrance in the south face of the Minera Limeworks quarry. It was originally discovered and explored in 1964 by the Wrexham Caving Club, before it was merged into the North Wales Caving Club.

After a short series of mined passages there is a narrow 10 metre pitch into the main levels consisting of a series of well-decorated galleries. Some of the passages come very close to the cave Ogof Llyn Du whose access is blocked by a deep and difficult sump.

Over the years this cave had been under threat by the quarry operations, but it is now protected as an SSSI. and owned by North Wales Wildlife Trust

== Bibliography ==
- Appleton, Peter (1989). "Limestones and Caves of North Wales". In Ford, Trevor D. (ed.). Limestones and Caves of Wales. Cambridge University Press. pp. 233–7. ISBN 0-521-32438-6.
- Waltham, A.C., Simms, M.J., Farrant, A.R., Goldie, H.S. (1997). Karst and Caves of Great Britain. Chapman & Hall, 2-6 Boundary Row, London SE1 8HN, UK. pp. 262–4. ISBN 0-412-78860-8.
