= Bersham =

Village in Wales

Coordinates: 53.035°N 3.034°W

Bersham: Welsh: Y Bers
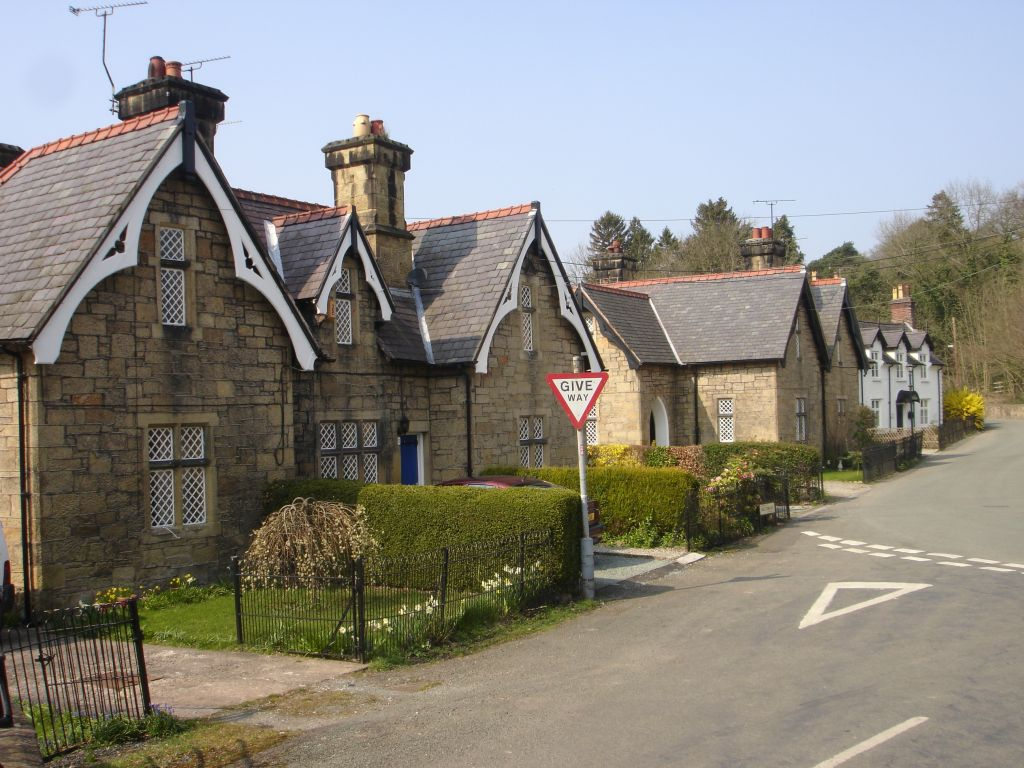
- Bersham's picturesque cottages, formerly offices of the ironworks

- Location within Wrexham
- OS grid reference: SJ306491
- Community: Esclusham
- Principal area: Wrexham
- Preserved county: Clwyd
- Country: Wales
- Sovereign state: United Kingdom
- Post town: WREXHAM
- Postcode district: LL14
- Dialling code: 01978
- Police: North Wales
- Fire: North Wales
- Ambulance: Welsh
- UK Parliament: Clwyd South
- Senedd Cymru – Welsh Parliament: Clwyd South

Bersham (Welsh: Y Bers; standardised: Bers) is a village in Wrexham County Borough, Wales, that lies next to the River Clywedog, and is in the community of Esclusham. Bersham was historically a major industrial centre of the area, but despite this the village still retains a rural feeling.

== Historical significance ==
The village holds special importance for economic historians, for not only did it house the workshops of the skilled Davies brothers, it was one of the cradles of the Industrial Revolution. This is the place where British iron making began in 1670, where smelting iron ore with coke began in 1721, and where John Wilkinson, the 'Iron Mad' pioneer of the Industrial Revolution, set up shop in 1761. For many years the area was one of the most important iron manufacturing centres in the world. The Bersham Ironworks Museum tells the story of the man who bored cannon for the American War of Independence and cylinders for James Watt's revolutionary steam engine that changed the face of the world.

Bersham Colliery, the last working coal mine in the former Denbighshire Coalfield, was not actually in the village of Bersham but situated nearby in the village of Rhostyllen, it closed in 1986. Mining and consequent subsidence impacted the nearby Erddig House, and in the 1970s, the National Trust, which managed the house, made a successful claim for compensation against the National Coal Board.

== Plas Power Woods ==
Plas Power Woods comprise 33.7ha of woodland running along the River Clywedog between Coedpoeth and Bersham, and stretches to the Nant Mill Wood situated upstream to the east on the Clywedog Trail. The vast majority of the woodland is ancient woodland although some parts were replanted with conifers and, locally, with beech and/or sycamore as late as the 1960s. The Woodland Trust is gradually restoring the native broadleaf woodland character of the plantation areas.

Several features of historical importance are present; a section of Offa's Dyke runs across the Clywedog Valley through Plas Power Woods. Several Listed structures are also present including Plas Power Park wall, an ornate cast iron Victorian era bridge and railings and the Western Weir, Nant Bridge, Bersham Lodge and Caeau Wier.

== Bersham Church and the FitzHugh family ==
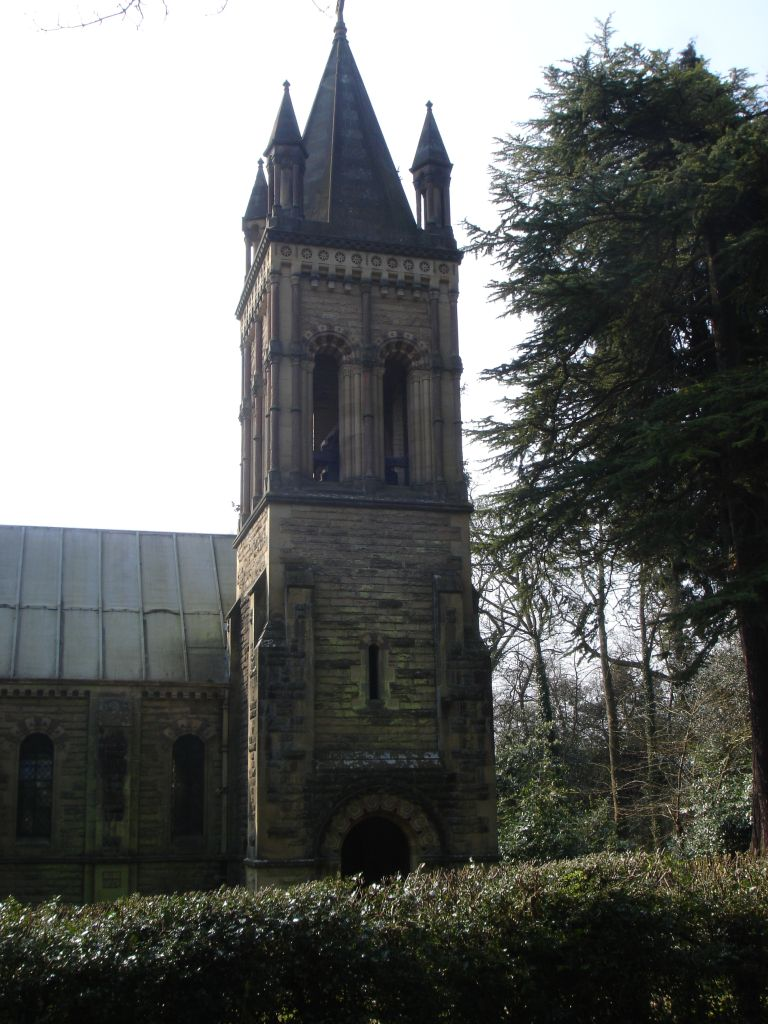
Bersham Church

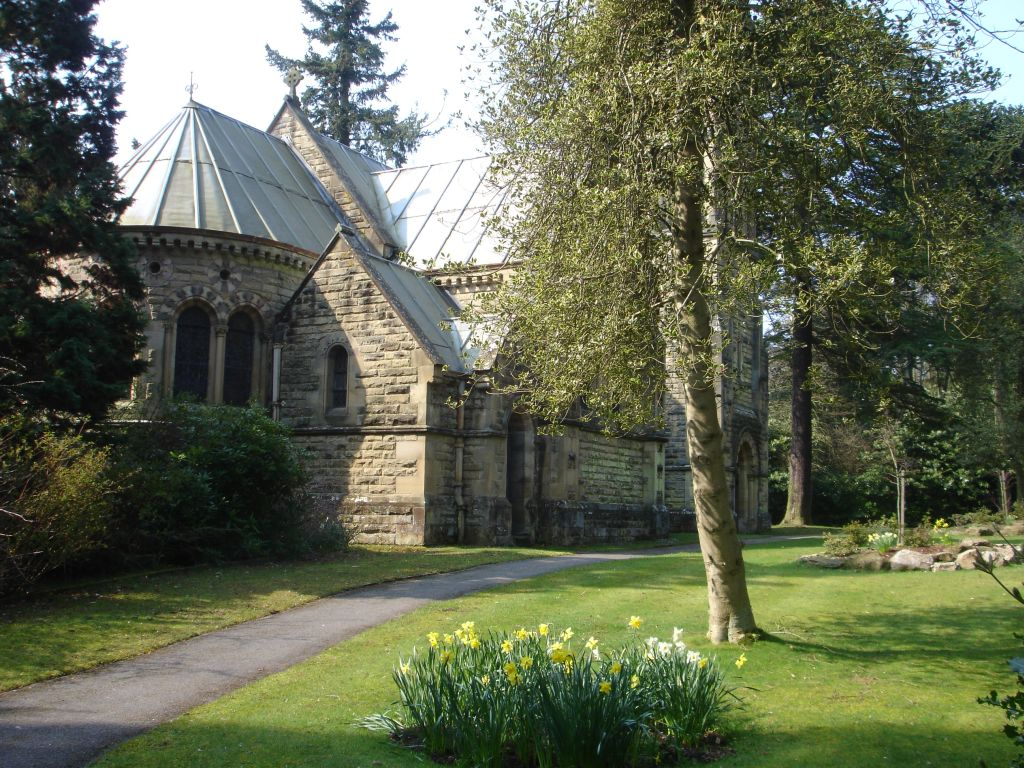
Bersham Church

St Mary's in Plas Power is a 19th-century parish church in the heart of the village. The architect was John Gibson, the builder was Mr George Clark of Pen-y-gelli Hall, Coedpoeth, and the church was entirely funded by Thomas Lloyd FitzHugh, with first services held there in January 1876. His wife Emily Mary from Charlecote in Warwickshire took a great interest in the building and is the reason the architect and organ builder were both from that county. It was originally built without a bell tower; however, one was added some years later. When Captain Godfrey FitzHugh was killed on active service in Palestine in 1917 his widow Ethel had the bells installed in his memory. They consist of a carillon of eight bells operated by hand and are still in use today.
