= Gwynfryn, Wrexham =

Village in Wales

Coordinates: 53.066°N 3.106°W

Gwynfryn
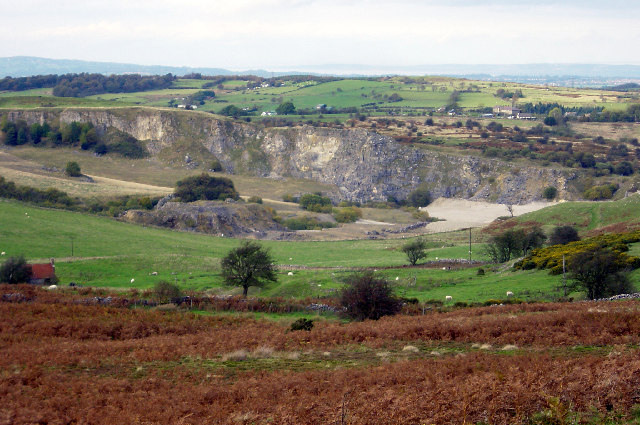
- Part of the village of Gwynfryn, viewed across a former limestone quarry

- Location within Wrexham
- OS grid reference: SJ259526
- Community: Minera
- Principal area: Wrexham
- Preserved county: Clwyd
- Country: Wales
- Sovereign state: United Kingdom
- Post town: WREXHAM
- Postcode district: LL11
- Dialling code: 01978
- Police: North Wales
- Fire: North Wales
- Ambulance: Welsh
- UK Parliament: Clwyd South
- Senedd Cymru – Welsh Parliament: Clwyd South

Gwynfryn is a hill-top village in the community of Minera in Wrexham County Borough, Wales. Its name, originally that of the village chapel, is formed from the Welsh words bryn, "hill", and gwyn, "white": "white hill". At the time of the 2001 census, its population combined with that of the neighbouring, larger village of Bwlchgwyn was 1,148.

Like the neighbouring villages of Minera and Bwlchgwyn, Gwynfryn is associated with the development of lead mines and limestone quarries in the vicinity. It is situated at the head of the Clywedog Valley in a hilly limestone area. The area was originally known as Plas-Gwyn ("white hall") Mountain, its name on the 1879 and 1900 Ordnance Surveys of Denbighshire, or as Pentre-Bais ("petticoat village"). According to a local story the latter name was changed to Gwynfryn by the disapproving village postmaster (or schoolmaster, in some versions).

There was a Wesleyan Methodist chapel in Gwynfryn, which in 1905 had a congregation of 194. There was also a small Church in Wales chapel, St David's, which as of 2010 has been closed.

The musician, composer and Eisteddfod adjudicator Thomas Carrington (1881–1961) was born in Gwynfryn.
