= Ogof Llyn Parc =

Cave near Wrexham, Wales

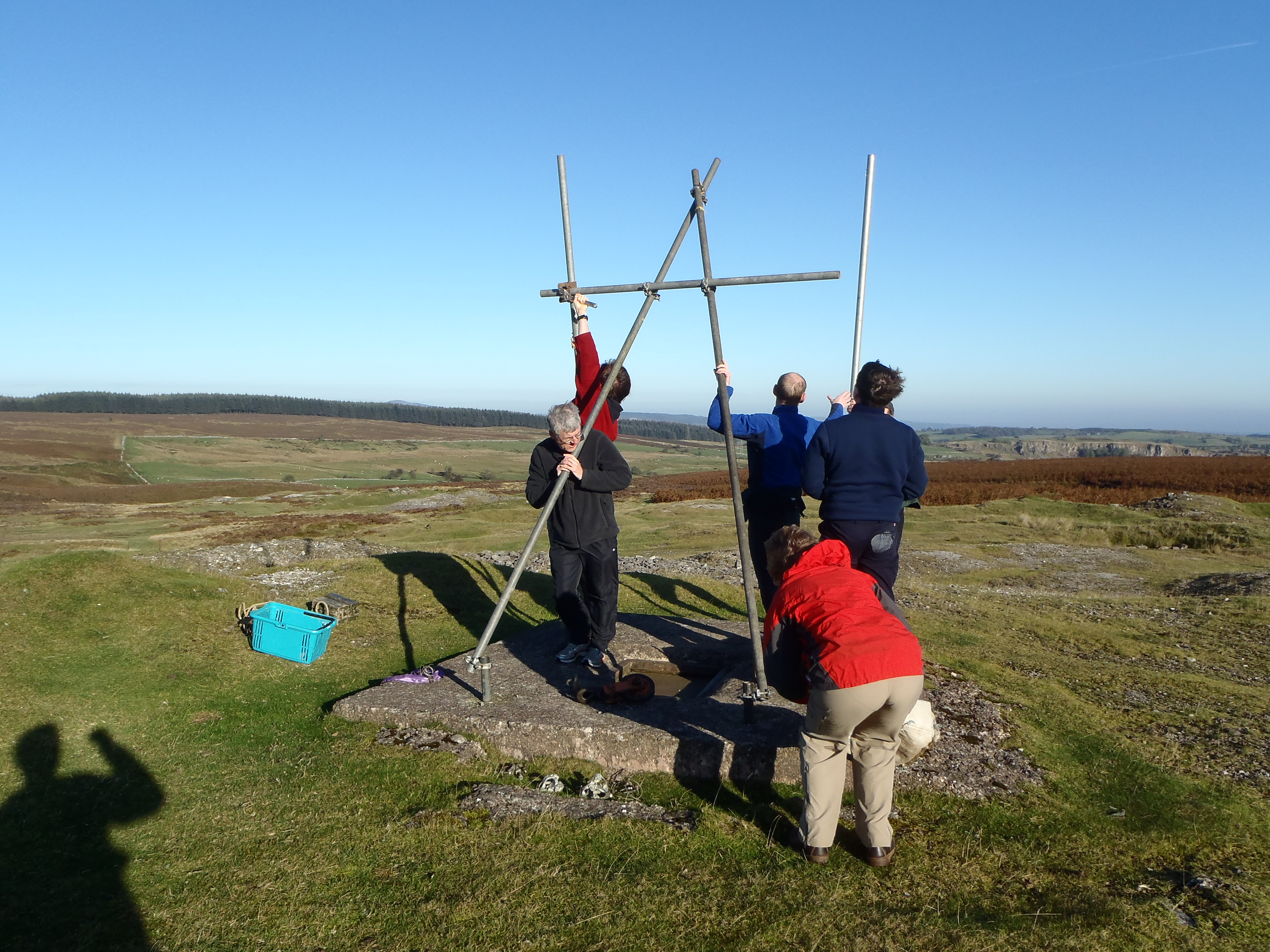
- Entrance shaft

- Location within Wales
- Location: Esclusham Mountain, Wrexham, Wales
- OS grid: SJ 2494 5067
- Coordinates: 53°02′53″N 3°07′16″W
- Depth: 430 metres (1,410 ft)
- Length: 4.0 kilometres (2.5 mi)
- Discovery: North Wales Caving Club
- Geology: Limestone
- Hazards: 100 metres (330 ft) entrance shaft
- Access: contact North Wales Caving Club
- Registry: Cambrian Cave Registry

Ogof Llyn Parc usually known as Pool Park is a cave on Esclusham Mountain above Wrexham, Wales, that has a 100 metres (330 ft) entrance shaft, normally descended by winch to the mine levels. Further caving and two ladders reaches the natural cave levels in which there are streamways.
