= Nant Mill =

Country park in Wrexham County Borough, Wales

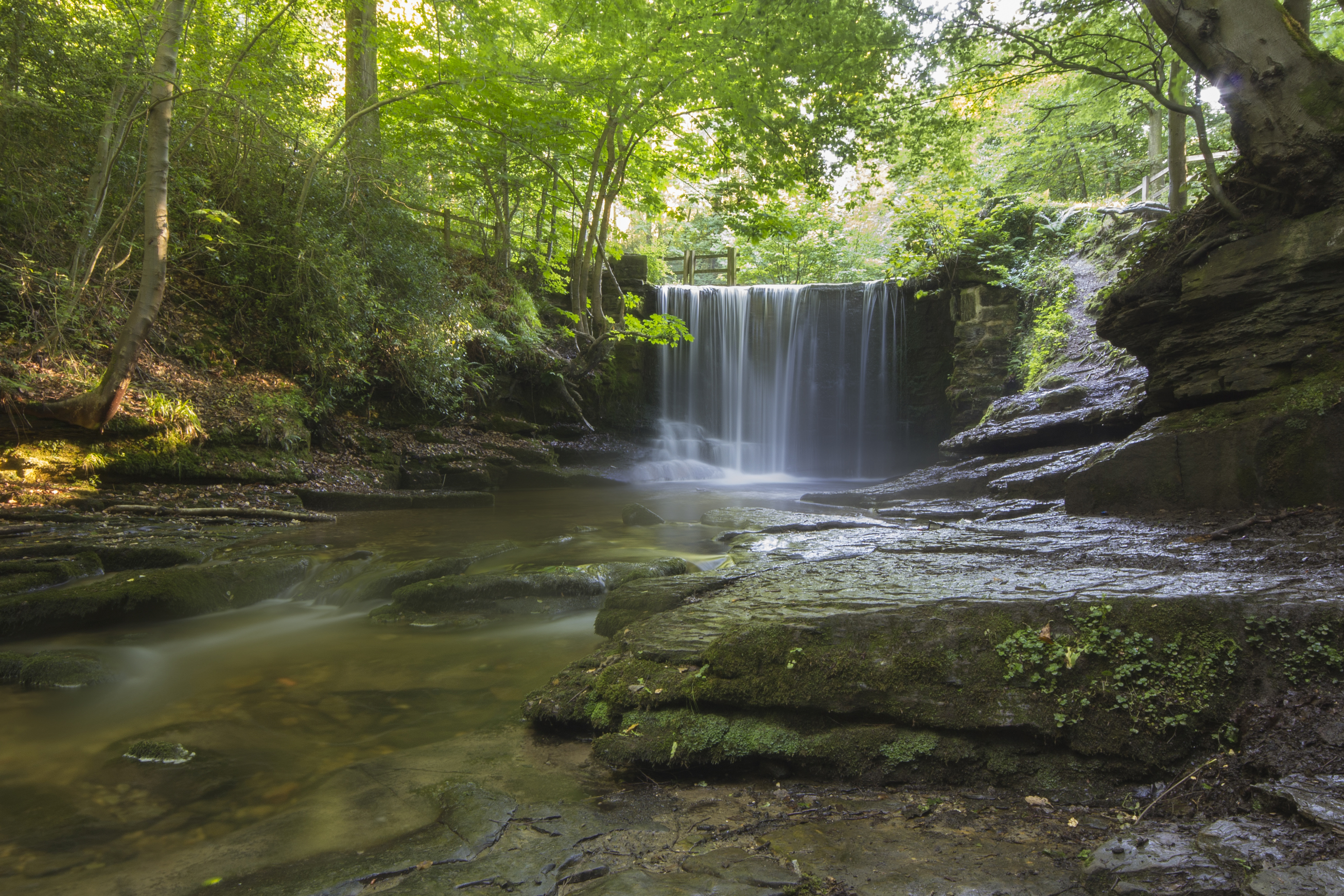
- A waterfall in its woodlands, downstream along the River Clywedog, from the park's visitor centre.

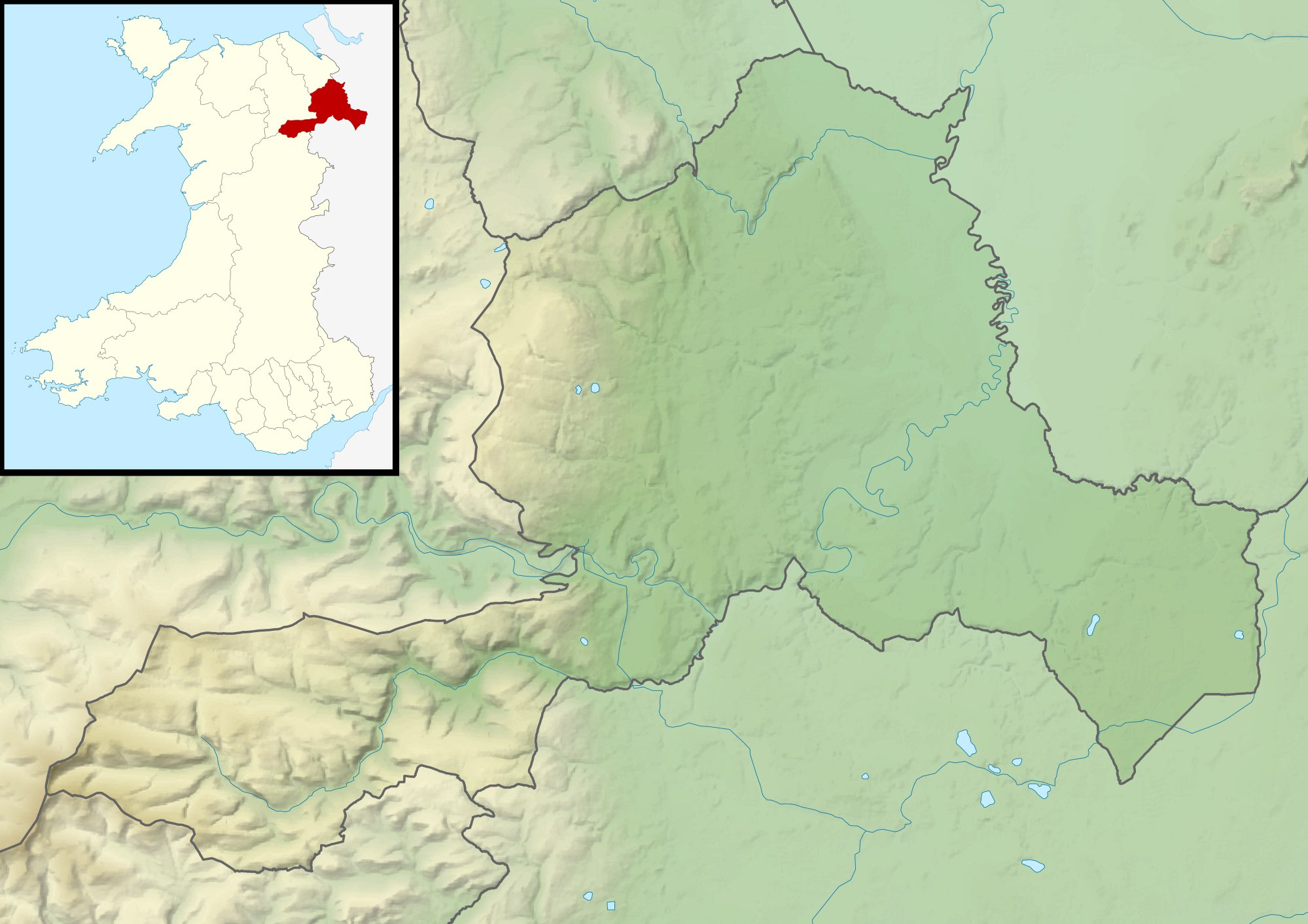
- Location within Wrexham
- Type: Country park
- Location: Wrexham County Borough, Wales
- Coordinates: 53°02′36″N 3°03′40″W
- Operator: Wrexham County Borough Council
- Status: Open all year

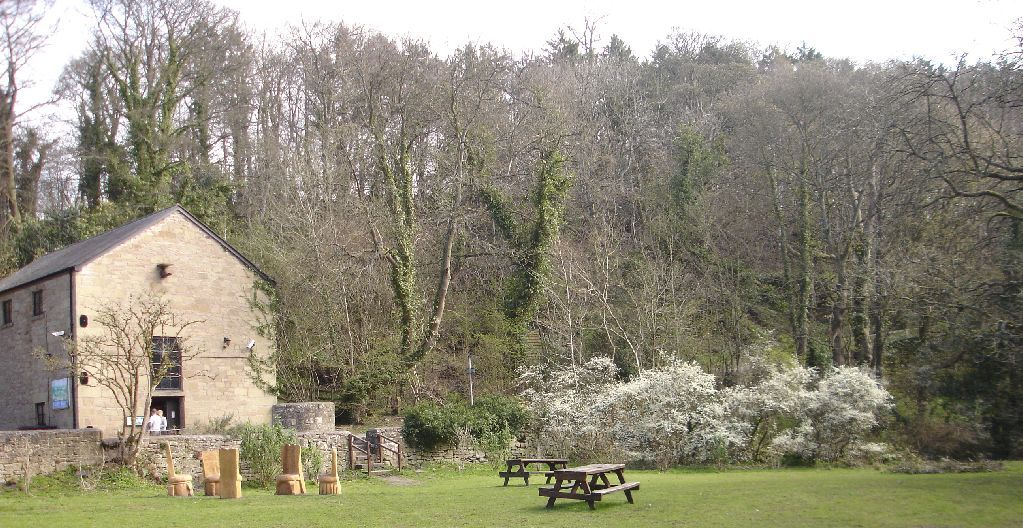
The park's visitor centre

Nant Mill is a country park in Wrexham County Borough, Wales. It is managed by Wrexham County Borough Council and named after a historic corn mill located on the site. It forms part of the Clywedog Trail and includes a visitor centre and two woods, Nant Wood and Plas Power, from which Offa's Dyke can be seen.
