= Minera Limeworks =

Mine near Wrexham, Wales

Coordinates: 53.06001°N 3.11608°W

Minera Lime Company
- Interactive map of Minera Lime Company
- Location: Wales
- Products: Lime
- Opened: 1852
- Active: 1852-1972
- Closed: 1993
- Company: North Wales Wildlife Trust

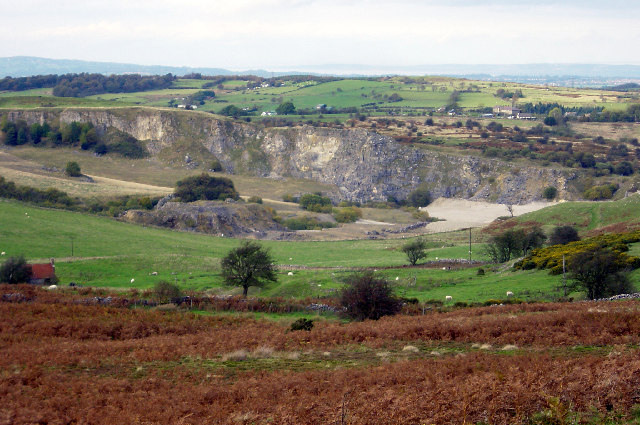
Abandoned quarry workings

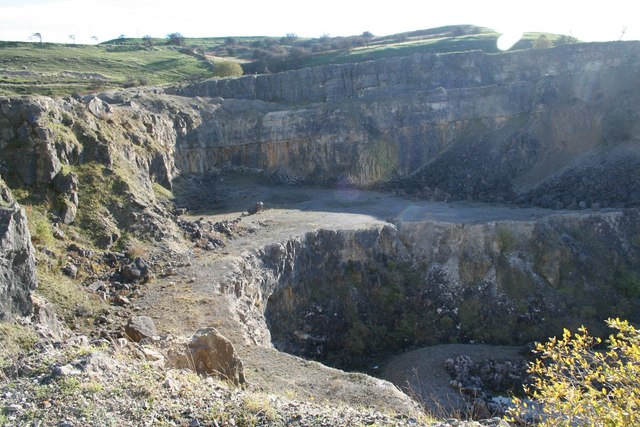
The last worked face at the works.

The Minera Limeworks were extensive lime quarries and kilns at Minera in Wrexham, Wales. It was located at grid reference SJ253520, near the villages of Gwynfryn, Minera, and Coedpoeth and was locally referred to as The Calch.

== History ==
The Minera Limeworks were once the largest lime workings in the north of Wales. Limeburning at Minera is recorded from as early as 1620 but the Minera Lime Company was established in 1852. The total output from the Minera area quarries was estimated, in 1859, to be around 300,000 tons, with 200,000 tons of this converted to lime.

The Minera Lime Company became a limited company in 1865, and this prompted some heavy cash injection into the works. Using this money, the company erected a "Hoffmann kiln". Originally destined for brickmaking, it was soon converted to limeburning. This kiln still exists and is one of three that were purpose-built for lime burning left in the UK: another is located at Langcliffe in Yorkshire, another is located at Llanymynech Limeworks.

The quarries had an extensive internal 2 foot gauge railway to bring limestone to the kilns. This was originally worked by horses, and later by internal combustion locomotives until c1957. The quarry was connected to the standard gauge railway, and had their own steam locomotive and later a diesel shunter. They also had hundreds of open coal wagons and closed lime wagons at its peak. Hornby Railways and Dapol both have model wagons detailing the Minera Lime Co. It also had extensive kilns, still there to this day. The works closed in 1972 and the Wrexham and Minera Branch railway lines were pulled up at around the same time.

== Current usage ==
Blasting and quarrying of limestone, used for road building materials, continued at the site until 1993.

For many years since closure, the quarry served as storage for road building materials, and a tipple for them was built, but was soon abandoned. In 2004-05 the quarry was subject to a cleanup operation, where all the materials were taken and the whole area flattened. Tarmac (a supplier of materials to the building trade) who had taken interest in the site took several core samples and found the quarry to still be a viable source of lime.

Lafarge Aggregates owned the site until recently, following their take over of Redland plc and erected large amounts of fencing around most of the site as well as signage advising to stick to signed footpaths, restricting movement around the quarry for health and safety purposes. Lafarge had no interest in resuming quarrying operations at the site here.

The Minera Quarry Trust negotiated with Lafarge about the future of the site. Minera Quarry Trust was established in 2005 with the explicit aim of conserving the former quarry site for the benefit of the public. Since then the trust has made significant progress in developing a plan of action for the site that encompasses both short term improvements and long term sustainability for the site. The Trust worked in partnership with North Wales Wildlife Trust to develop the project and received political endorsement from Wrexham County Borough Council.

North Wales Wildlife Trust purchased the site for £1 from Tarmac, who also donated £100,000 so work could be carried out to make the site safe for public access. The site was officially opened on 2 June 2018 by Mike Dilger as their 36th Wildlife Reserve in North Wales.

The quarry contains entrances to the important caves Ogof Dydd Byraf and Ogof Llyn Du whose passages come very close to Ogof Cefn-y-Gist and Ogof Llyn Parc. starting in the quarry linked to many underground rivers.

== See also ==
- Mining
- Quarry
