= Minera =

Village in Wales

Minera: Welsh: Y Mwynglawdd
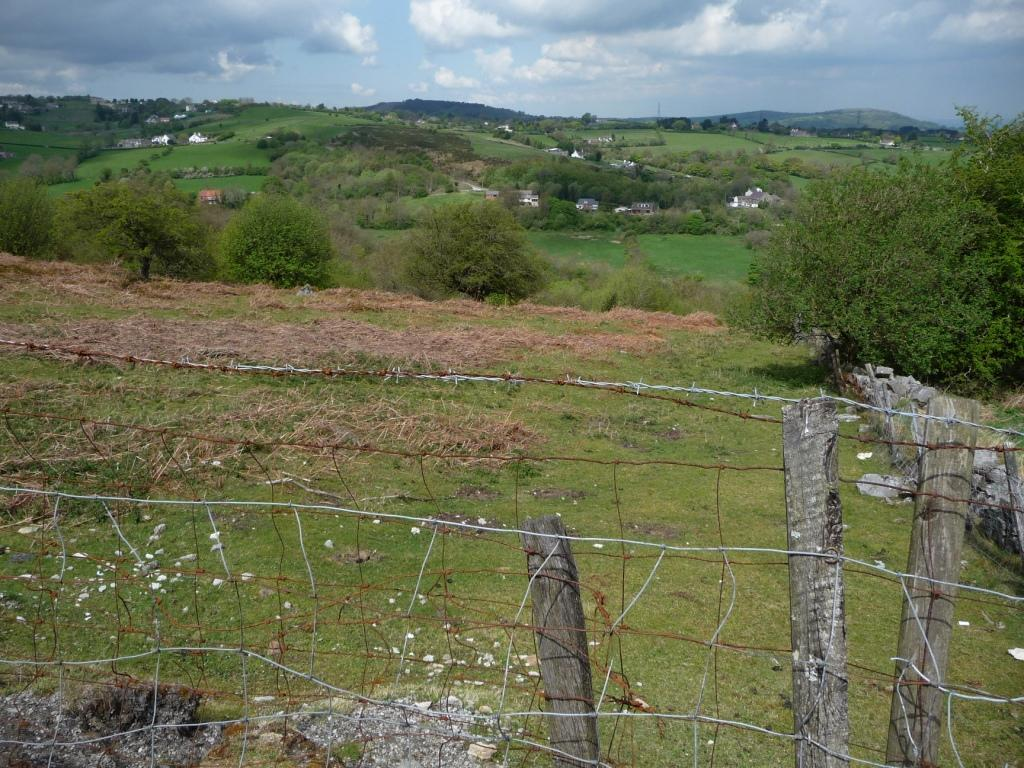
- View from Minera Mountain of the western end of the village

- Location within Wrexham
- Population: 1,617 (2011)
- OS grid reference: SJ267518
- Community: Minera
- Principal area: Wrexham
- Preserved county: Clwyd
- Country: Wales
- Sovereign state: United Kingdom
- Post town: WREXHAM
- Postcode district: LL11
- Dialling code: 01978
- Police: North Wales
- Fire: North Wales
- Ambulance: Welsh
- UK Parliament: Clwyd South
- Senedd Cymru – Welsh Parliament: Clwyd South
- List of places UK Wales Wrexham 53.059°N 3.093°W

Minera (Welsh: Mwynglawdd; Welsh pronunciation) is a village and community in Wrexham County Borough, Wales. It adjoins the village of Coedpoeth.

The community, which in addition to Minera village includes a number of smaller hamlets such as Gwynfryn and New Brighton and large areas of farmland, had a total population of 1,608 at the 2001 census, increasing slightly to 1,617 at the 2011 Census.

== History ==
The name Minera has an unusual source, being derived from the low Latin for "mine" or "ore". This name was recorded as early as 1339. The parallel Welsh name Mwynglawdd translates roughly as "ore mine".

In common with many Welsh settlements, Minera did not develop as a compact 'village' in the English understanding of the word until the 19th century. Under the manorial administration imposed after the mediaeval English conquest of Wales, Minera existed as a manor and township within the Lordship of Bromfield. Unlike many of the surrounding manors, such as Esclusham, Eglwysegle and Ruabon, land tenure within Minera was mostly servile, rather than free.

The history of Minera is closely related to that of its lead mines. Although earlier use, dating back perhaps as far as the Roman occupation, has been suggested, the first clear documentary evidence of the industry appears during the reign of Edward I, when miners from Minera were sent to Cornwall to help develop the tin mining industry. Extraction of lead and coal was later joined by the quarrying of silica stone and limestone, with three lime kilns being recorded in operation at Minera Mill in 1620. Further industrial development took place in the 19th century. The lead mines expanded under the guidance of engineer John Taylor and the Minera Limeworks came into operation, while a branch of the North Wales Mineral Railway was built in 1844 to serve the area.

== Governance ==
An electoral ward in the same name exists. This ward stretches north to Broughton and at the 2011 Census had a population of 2,472.

== Churches ==
There is thought to have been a "chapel of ease" to Wrexham parish church as early as 1577: built of wood, it was successively rebuilt in 1728-33 and 1815. The growing population of the area meant that Minera (previously a township of the parish of Wrexham) was created as a separate ecclesiastical parish in 1844. In 1864-5 the old church, which had become dilapidated, was demolished and a new church was built to designs by Kennedy and Rogers of Bangor, preserving the outlines and interior of the old building. Minera's first Wesleyan Methodist chapel was built in 1804; it was originally named Minera Chapel, but in 1859, it was renamed Pen-y-Bryn.

== Recent history ==
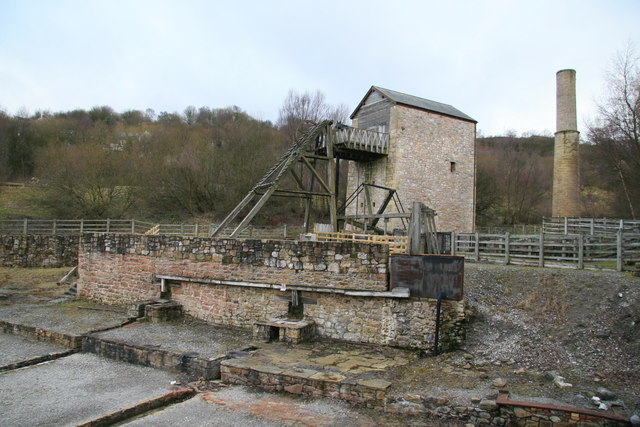
The Meadow Shaft of the Minera Lead Mines, near the hamlet of New Brighton. The buildings have been restored as a visitor centre

The lead and zinc mining industry declined in the early years of the 20th century, the mines finally closing in 1914 (the engine house of the Meadow Shaft remained standing in a derelict condition until the early 1990s when it was restored). Despite the loss of its traditional industries the village of Minera expanded rapidly in the period after World War II, thanks to the construction of council housing estates.

The civil parish of Minera, whose boundaries approximated those of the old township of Minera, was replaced by the community of Minera under the terms of the Local Government Act 1972; the records of the old Minera Parish Council are held in the Denbighshire Record Office.

== Football ==
Reports exist of the short-lived Minera Rovers and Minera Victoria contesting the Welsh Amateur Cup in 1890 and 1891. By 1898 another local team, Minera St Marys, had joined the Denbighshire League. Minera St Marys only lasted one season in this competition, taking on the fixtures of Cerney Swifts and finishing second from bottom.

Whilst other Minera teams existed, none competed in any recognised leagues again until 1981 when Minera joined Welsh National League Wrexham Area Division 4. The team spent three seasons in Division 4 before finishing third in 1984 and gaining promotion to Welsh National League Wrexham Area Division 2 (formerly Division 3, renamed in 1984 following introduction of Premier Division). Minera stayed in this division until 1990 when they folded.
