= Wrexham railway station =

Wrexham, like most major towns and cities has more than one railway station, Wrexham railway station may refer to:

- Wrexham Central railway station
- Wrexham General railway station
- Wrexham Exchange station merged with Wrexham General
- Wrexham South railway station proposed station
- Wrexham North railway station proposed station
- Ruabon Interchange
- (Wrexham) Chirk railway station
- (Wrexham) Gwersyllt railway station
