= Wrexham South railway station =

Proposed railway station in Wales

Wrexham South De Wrecsam

General information
- Other names: South Wrexham
- Location: Wrexham County Borough; Wales
- System: Regional (proposed)
- Line: Shrewsbury–Chester line

Key dates
- July 2015: First proposed

Wrexham South (Welsh: De Wrecsam; also proposed as South Wrexham) is a proposed railway station on the Shrewsbury–Chester line, situated between Chirk and Wrexham, in Wrexham County Borough, Wales. As of January 2022, there is no definitive site for the proposed station, with proposals for the station to be located either near Johnstown or at Rhosymedre on the former Rhosymedre Halt railway station. If the latter location is decided, Ruabon would be the station closest to the south of Wrexham.

Wrexham South forms part of Transport for Wales' long-term goals for the North Wales Metro.

== History ==
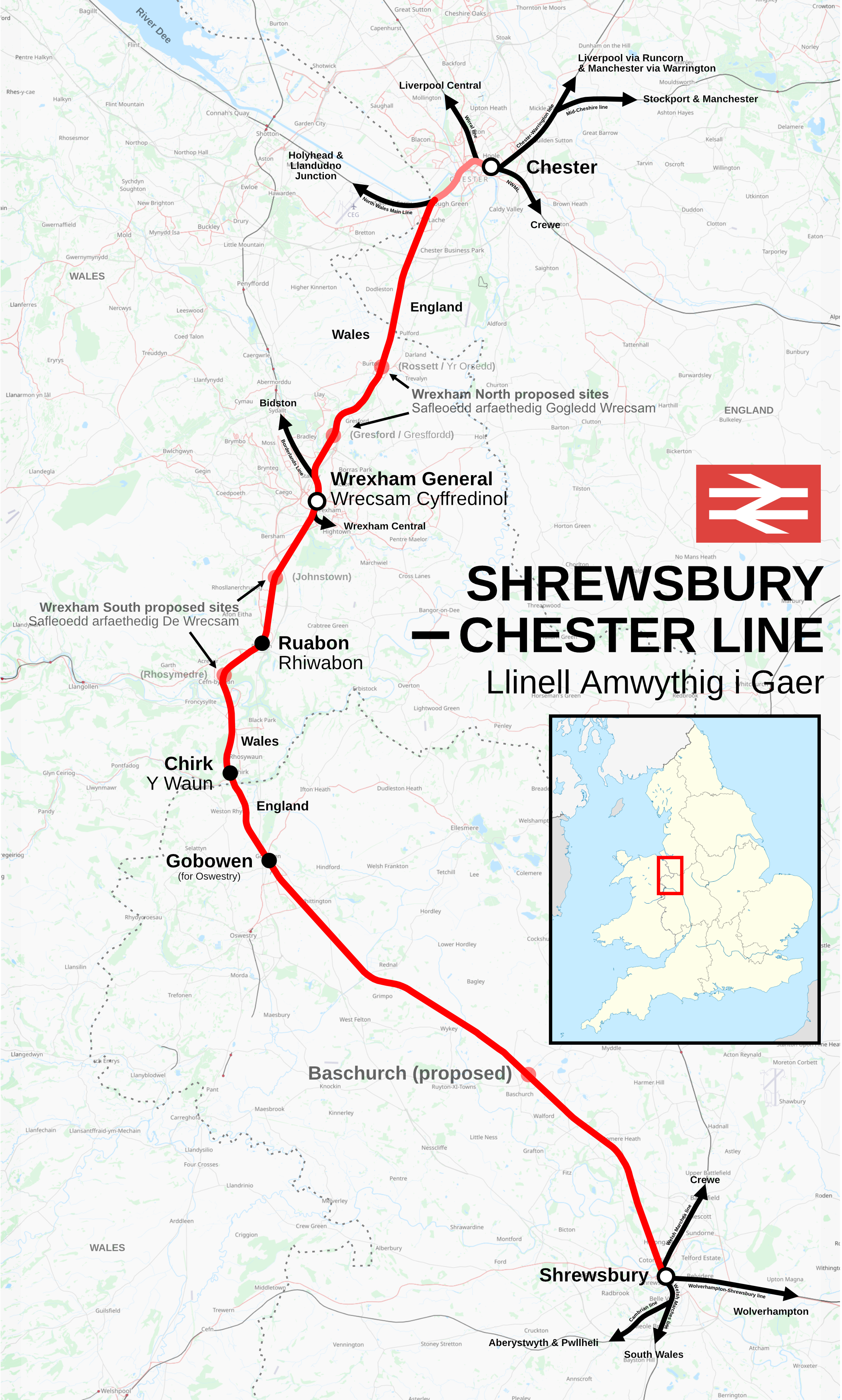
Map of Shrewsbury to Chester line, with two potential sites for Wrexham South marked surrounding Ruabon

A "South Wrexham" station was first proposed in July 2015, in the Welsh Government's National Transport Finance Plan 2015, alongside other proposed stations in Broughton, North Wrexham, Deeside, and Llangefni.

In April 2017, the station was placed on the Welsh Government's May 2017 stage-one assessment of new rail stations in Wales. The station was forecasted in the assessment to have annual passenger numbers of between 89,000 and 113,000 based on both 2011–12 model figures and the growth in passenger numbers between 2011 and 2016.

For stage 2 of the assessment, "South Wrexham" was allocated the old Rhosymedre Halt railway station site, located between Ruabon and Chirk railway stations. The assessment stated that benefits for the station were mainly the serving of Cefn Mawr and Rhosymedre. Due to the single track between Rossett and Stansty near Wrexham in the north of the county borough, any additional stations on the line would require further study into their impact on the line's timetable. The station's gradient, curved line location, proximity to Ruabon and Chirk stations, limited space for a footbridge and car parking, were also mentioned for further evaluation of the station, in particular for financing.

In April 2019, the Welsh Government announced that Wrexham South, alongside Wrexham North and Llangefni were to be dropped from the list (Broughton was dropped earlier), and would not proceed further in the assessment. Deeside Parkway was the only station in north Wales to remain on the list.

As rail infrastructure is not devolved in Wales, funding for the construction of a new railway station lies with the UK Government's Department for Transport (DfT) and is delivered by Network Rail. DfT would receive advice from Network Rail on the feasibility of the station.

In 2021, the proposed station re-emerged in Transport for Wales' Metro Development Plan published in March 2021, and the Future Developments plan for the North Wales Metro published in September 2021. The accompanying maps for the latter, used to represent Transport for Wales' long-term ambitions in the region, include a proposed station located south of Wrexham, near Johnstown, termed "Wrexham South". The longer-term plans (in comparison to the 2029 plans released on the same day), do not include a proposed date for the project and are accompanied by other projects, some critics may describe as being too ambitious.

== Proposed location ==
There is no definitive location for the station as of January 2022. Older proposals advocate for a station near Rhosymedre on the former Rhosymedre Halt railway station site, but newer maps of the proposed location show it to be more northerly towards Wrexham, near Johnstown.

Preceding station	Future services	Following station
Chirk or Ruabon	Transport for Wales; Shrewsbury–Chester line	Ruabon or Wrexham General
