= Rhosymedre Halt railway station =

Former railway station in Wrexham, Wales

Rhosymedre Halt

General information
- Location: Cefn Mawr & Rhosymedre, Wrexham County Borough; Wales
- Coordinates: 52.9764°N 3.0673°W
- Grid reference: SJ283426
- Platforms: 2

Other information
- Status: Disused

History
- Original company: Great Western Railway

Key dates
- 1 Sep 1906: Station opens
- 2 Mar 1959: Closed
Location

Rhosymedre Halt was a minor railway station on the Great Western Railway's London to Birkenhead main line, serving the mining village of Rhosymedre near Cefn Mawr in Wales. Although the station is gone, the railway remains open as part of the Shrewsbury to Chester Line. The station was situated in a deep cutting amidst a number of overbridges, but nothing now remains of the old platforms.

Express trains did not call at Rhosymedre, and the halt would have been served only by West Midlands & Shrewsbury to Wrexham & Chester local trains. Some proposals for a "Wrexham South railway station" involve the use of the former Rhosymedre Halt railway station site or slightly south of it.

== Neighbouring stations ==
Preceding station	Historical railways	Following station
Cefn	Great Western Railway; Shrewsbury to Chester Line	Ruabon
