= Pulford railway station =

Former railway station in England

Coordinates: 53.1299°N 2.9450°W

Pulford

General information
- Location: Pulford, Cheshire West and Chester; England
- Platforms: 2

Other information
- Status: Disused

History
- Original company: Great Western Railway

Key dates
- 4 November 1846: Station opens
- Jan 1855: Closed to Passengers
- 18 Jul 1959: Closed to Goods (as Pulford Siding)
Location

Pulford was a short-lived minor railway station located on the Great Western Railway's Paddington to Birkenhead line several miles south of Chester, just inside the English border. The route is still open today as part of the Shrewsbury to Chester Line. Nothing now remains at the site except for a Pulford AHB level crossing. The double track on the Wrexham to Chester section was singled in 1983 but was redoubled through here in 2017 as part of a £40 million upgrade of the route.

== Neighbouring stations ==
Preceding station	Historical railways	Following station
Rossett	Great Western Railway; Shrewsbury to Chester Line	Balderton
