= Rhosrobin Halt railway station =

Former railway station in Wrexham, Wales

Rhosrobin Halt

General information
- Location: Rhosrobin, Wrexham; Wales
- Coordinates: 53.0707°N 2.9973°W
- Grid reference: SJ331531
- Platforms: 2

Other information
- Status: Disused

History
- Original company: Great Western Railway

Key dates
- 1 Sep 1932: Station opens
- 6 Oct 1947: Closed to Passengers
Location

Rhosrobin Halt was a minor railway station located on the Great Western Railway's Paddington to Birkenhead line a few miles north of Wrexham in Wales. Only local trains called here, and freight was never handled at the station. The route is still open today as part of the Shrewsbury to Chester Line. The station was located just north of Wheatsheaf Junction, where the goods line from Cefn-y-Bedd joined on the north side of the line. The double track on the Wrexham to Chester section was singled in the 1980s but has been re-doubled in part since, with work completed in April 2017.

== Neighbouring stations ==
| Preceding station | Historical railways | Following station |
|---|---|---|
| Wrexham General | Great Western Railway; Shrewsbury to Chester Line | Gresford |
