= Gresford railway station =

Former railway station in Wales

Gresford (for Llay) Halt
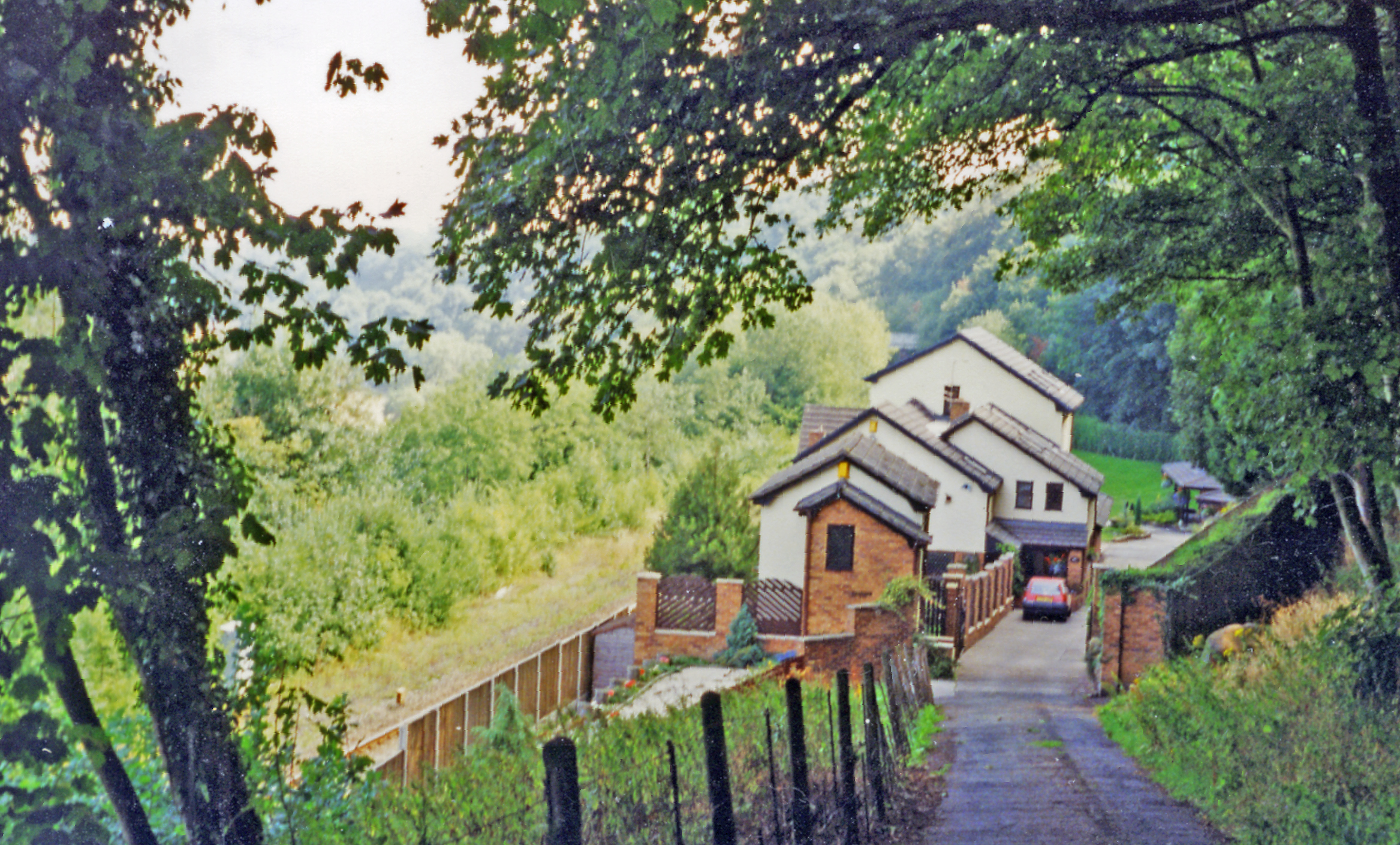
- The station buildings in 1995

General information
- Location: Gresford & Llay, Wrexham; Wales
- Coordinates: 53.0897°N 2.9772°W
- Grid reference: SJ345552
- Platforms: 2

Other information
- Status: Disused

History
- Original company: Shrewsbury and Chester Railway
- Pre-grouping: Great Western Railway
- Post-grouping: Great Western Railway

Key dates
- 4 November 1846: Station opens
- 10 Sep 1962: Closed
- 2 May 1955: Unstaffed
Location

Gresford (for Llay) Halt was a small railway station located on the Great Western Railway's Paddington to Birkenhead line a few miles north of Wrexham in Wales and halfway up the Gresford bank.

== Station structures ==
The station house was stone-built, consisted of two storeys, and designed in the cottage orné style. There was a simple waiting shelter on the platform. The architect was Thomas Penson of Chester. The downward (Chester bound) platform was lengthened in 1884. In about 1904–1905, the downward platform, built on wooden pillars, was replaced with a brick structure. A footbridge was constructed over the railway line near to the station in 1908.

== Station staff ==
In 1884, Henry Rickers was the Gresford signalman.

In September 1902, John Roberts, the Gresford stationmaster retired due to ill-health. He had been the stationmaster for 37 years.

In December 1906, Mr W. Wright the Gresford signalman retired.

In 1909, Mr G. Meeson, the Gresford stationmaster won £5 for the best kept station in the Northern Division.

== Closure ==
The station was closed on 10 September 1962. The route is still open today as part of the Shrewsbury to Chester Line but nothing now remains on the site of the halt. The double track on the Wrexham to Chester section was singled in 1983 and re-doubled in part, with work completed in April 2017.

== Fatal accident ==
On Saturday 9 August 1884, William Panter, a 17-year-old was employed as a contractor working on the modifications to the down (Chester bound) platform. He was doing his work by standing on the railway line when he was hit by a train travelling towards Wrexham. He was carried along the railway line and died. A coroner's inquest conducted at the Griffin Inn came to the verdict of accidental death.

== Neighbouring stations ==
Preceding station	Historical railways	Following station
Rhosrobin Halt	Great Western Railway; Shrewsbury to Chester Line	Rossett
