= Trehowell Halt railway station =

Disused railway station in Shropshire, England

Trehowell Halt

General information
- Location: Trehowell, Shropshire; England
- Coordinates: 52.9241°N 3.0591°W
- Grid reference: SJ288368
- Platforms: 2

Other information
- Status: Disused

History
- Original company: Great Western Railway

Key dates
- 27 July 1935: Station opens
- 29 Oct 1951: Closed to passengers
Location

Trehowell Halt was a small railway station located about a mile and a half south of Chirk, just inside the English border south of an overbridge on the minor road between Trehowell and Chirk Bank. It was opened by the Great Western Railway as part of its halt construction programme of the 1930s, aimed at countering emergent competition from bus services. Although the halt is gone the railway is still open today as part of the Shrewsbury to Chester Line.

== Neighbouring stations ==
Preceding station	Historical railways	Following station
Weston Rhyn	Great Western Railway; Shrewsbury to Chester Line	Chirk
