= Balderton railway station =

Disused station in Cheshire, England

Balderton
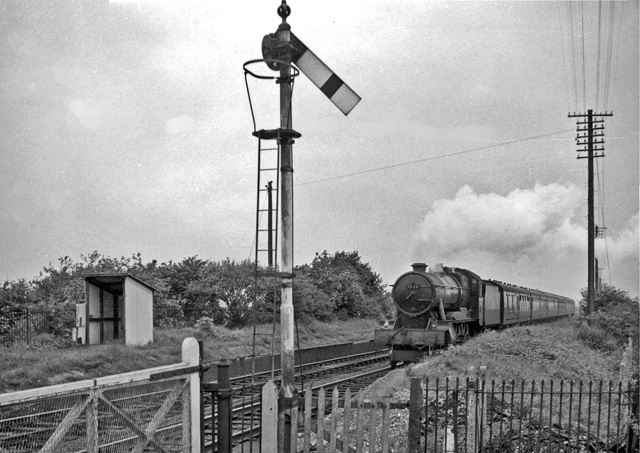
- The site of Balderton station in 1961

General information
- Location: Balderton, Cheshire West and Chester; England
- Coordinates: 53.1547°N 2.9349°W
- Grid reference: SJ374623
- Platforms: 2

Other information
- Status: Disused

History
- Original company: Great Western Railway
- Pre-grouping: Great Western Railway
- Post-grouping: Great Western Railway

Key dates
- 1 July 1901: Station opens
- 3 March 1952: Station closes
- 1 Nov 1954: Closed to Goods
Location

Balderton railway station was a minor railway station serving the village of Balderton in Cheshire, England. It was located on the Great Western Railway (GWR) main line from London Paddington to Birkenhead Woodside. The 53-yard (48 m) Balderton Tunnel is just south of the station site, and there is an automatic half-barrier (AHB) level crossing adjacent to the site today.

The 15 in (381 mm) gauge Eaton Hall Railway, opened in 1896 to serve the estate of the Duke of Westminster, met the GWR line at Balderton.

== History ==
The station was opened by the GWR and stayed with that company during the Grouping of 1923. On nationalisation in 1948, the line passed on to the Western Region of British Railways. Balderton was closed to passengers in 1952 and the goods service was closed in 1954.

Preceding station	Historical railways	Following station
Pulford	Great Western Railway; Shrewsbury to Chester Line	Saltney
