= Weston Rhyn railway station =

Disused railway station in Shropshire, England

Weston Rhyn
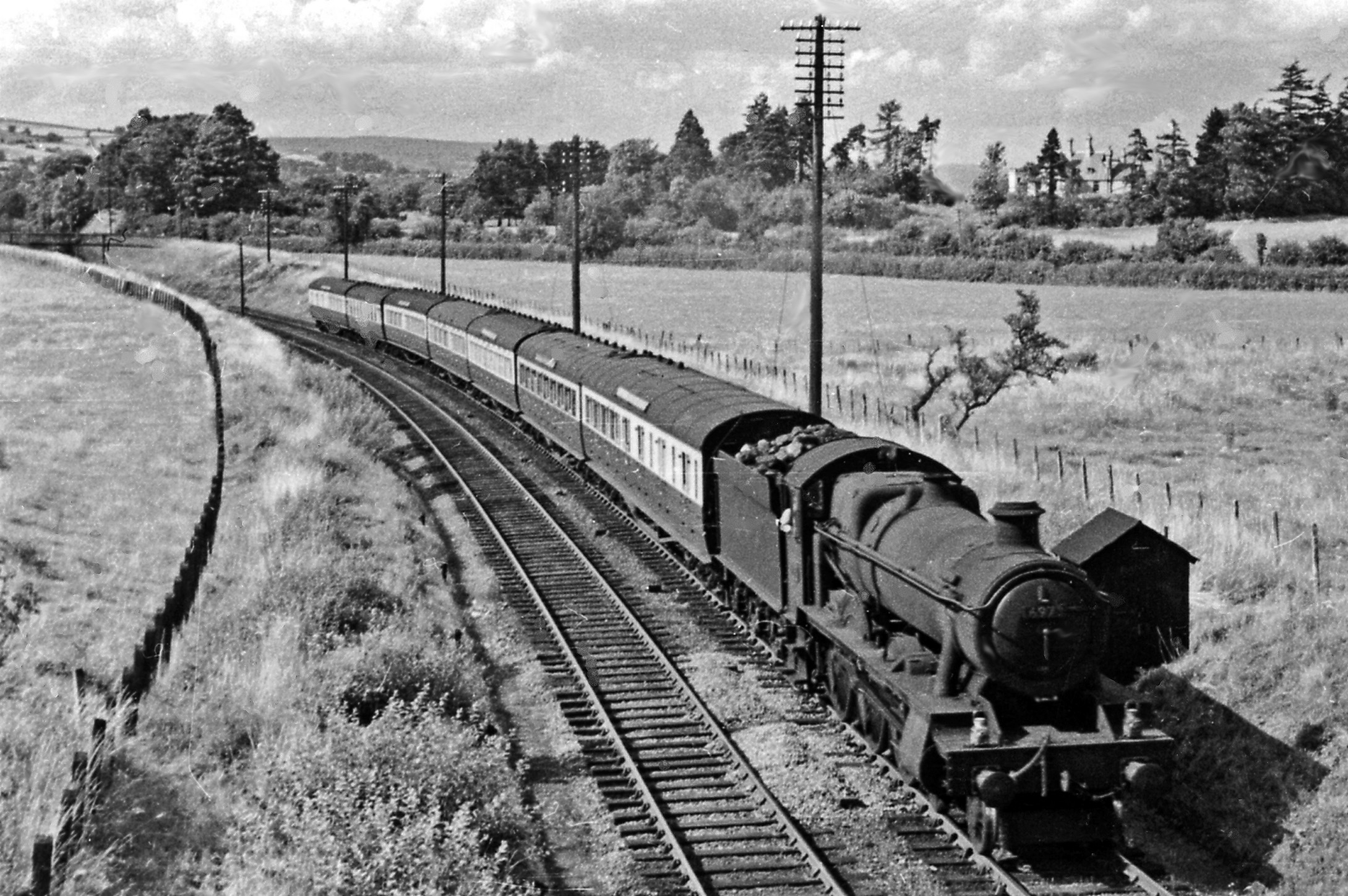
- Birkenhead - Paddington express approaching the site of the station.

General information
- Location: Weston Rhyn and Preesgweene, Shropshire; England
- Coordinates: 52.9172°N 3.0537°W
- Grid reference: SJ291360
- Platforms: 2

Other information
- Status: Disused

History
- Original company: Shrewsbury, Oswestry and Chester Junction Railway
- Pre-grouping: Great Western Railway

Key dates
- 12 October 1848: Opened as Preesgweene
- by January 1902: Renamed Preesgweene for Weston Rhyn
- February 1935: Renamed Weston Rhyn
- 12 Sep 1960: Closed to passengers
- 4 Nov 1963: Closed to Goods
Location

Weston Rhyn railway station was a minor station on the Great Western Railway's London to Birkenhead main line serving the villages of Weston Rhyn and Preesgweene in England. It had an adjacent signal box and level crossing and immediately to the south were Up & Down Goods Loops. It had originally opened as Preesgweene (or Presgwyn?) and closed for the first time in March 1855. It re-opened as Preesgweene in November 1871 and was renamed Weston Rhyn in February 1935 It closed in 1960 but the railway is still open today as part of the Shrewsbury to Chester Line. After closure the platforms were removed but the station building was converted to a private residence.

== Historical services ==
Express trains did not call there and it would have been served by West Midlands & Shrewsbury to Wrexham & Chester local trains; typically about half a dozen trains a day.

According to the Official Handbook of Stations the following classes of traffic were being handled at this station in 1956: G, P and there was no crane. Additionally, the National Coal Board had sidings on the east side of the line serving Ifton colliery.

Preceding station	Historical railways	Following station
Gobowen	Great Western Railway; Shrewsbury to Chester Line	Trehowell Halt
