= Network North Wales =

Transport project in Wales

Overview
- Native name: Rhwydwaith Gogledd Cymru (Welsh)
- Owner: Transport for Wales
- Area served: North Wales: Conwy County Borough; Denbighshire; Flintshire; Gwynedd; Isle of Anglesey; Wrexham County Borough; and neighbouring regions in England: Cheshire; Shropshire; Liverpool City Region; Others
- Transit type: Bus transport; Rail transport; Metro-style services
- Website: https://tfw.wales/projects/network-north-wales

Operation
- Began operation: May 2025; 1 year ago
- Operators: Transport for Wales Rail; TrawsCymru

Network North Wales (Welsh: Rhwydwaith Gogledd Cymru), previously and encompassing the North Wales Metro (Welsh: Metro Gogledd Cymru; originally the North East Wales Metro; (Note: First proposed as the "North East Wales Metro". However, following criticism from North West Wales MS's of the project being wholly focused on North East Wales, it was then referred to as the "North Wales Metro" by the Welsh Government in media announcements and by Transport for Wales. Although initial proposal documents retain the name "North East Wales Metro". The most recent proposal in 2021, used only North Wales Metro.) Welsh: Metro Gogledd-Ddwyrain Cymru), is a multi-modal transport improvement programme in North Wales, to develop an interconnected multi-modal network of public transport, with a combination of bus, heavy rail, and "Metro" services.

First proposed as the "North East Wales Metro", it was initially focused on linking major settlements and employment areas of the north-east of Wales with north-west England, with its hubs located in Wrexham, Chester and Deeside. Although the programme has since expanded, with proposals extending to Anglesey in the north-west of Wales, and renamed "North Wales Metro". The existing Borderlands (Wrexham–Bidston) line forms a core rail component (a "spine") of the Metro network, where projects to increase connections, integrated access, and service frequency between Wrexham, Deeside and Liverpool are centred upon. The proposals were put forward in 2016 as is part of Welsh Labour's plan for north Wales. Labour had pledged to open the system by 2035. The proposals were included in the 2018 Wales & Borders franchise contest. It one of three regional strategies proposed by the Welsh Government, alongside the South Wales Metro, and Swansea Bay and West Wales Metro.

In May 2025, a larger programme called "Network North Wales" was launched, with the "Metro" being included as part of it. It rebranded the Borderlands line as the "Wrexham to Liverpool line", and began applying the network and "Metro" branding.

== History ==
=== Labour manifesto proposal ===
On 16 April 2016, ahead of the upcoming Welsh Assembly election on 5 May 2016, Welsh Labour unveiled plans for the North Wales Metro to be completed by 2035, should they be re-elected to the Welsh Government. It was quickly branded as an election gimmick by Plaid Cymru, and the Welsh Conservatives, with the project's westernmost reach stopping at Rhyl at the time, also criticised for excluding the western principal areas of North Wales.

Welsh First Minister, Carwyn Jones, envisioned his plans for a tram system with even "Boris-style bikes" as part of the new transport system for North Wales. The proposals were announced at the Welsh Labour Conference in Llandudno, after Labour party leader, Jeremy Corbyn, criticised the state of the existing rail system in North Wales. Jones denied that the proposal was being used to gain votes in the upcoming election, but admitted that the Welsh Government would be more focussed on improving the existing network.

The conference proposal included:

- A Light-rail/Tram 'Metro' system across North Wales
- Upgrading railway stations
- Improved links with Northern England, including links to Manchester Airport, and Liverpool John Lennon Airport.
- Re-purposing, previously disused, railway tracks into dedicated cycle routes and improving the safety of cyclists on roads.
- Improved bus services to and from railways stations, with increased regular bus services on Sundays.
- A bicycle hire system, like London's "Boris-style bikes".

=== North East Wales Metro ===
==== 2017 plan ====
On 1 March 2017, "Moving North Wales Forward — Our Vision for North Wales and the North East Wales Metro" was published by the Welsh Government. Detailing, that alongside plans for infrastructure projects improving North Wales' roads, there are plans for improvements to the rail infrastructure and integrated transport schemes in North Wales.

These include (stated in March 2017):

- Improving passenger capacity at Chester
- Development of transport hubs in Wrexham and Deeside, with additional improved rail access in the latter
- Electrification of the North Wales Coast line
- Improving rail capacity to facilitate more services between Wrexham and Chester
- Improved signalling and line speed on the North Wales Coast line (by Network Rail)
- Improved line speed on the Borderlands line
- Development of rail freight facilities at the Port of Holyhead with an emphasis on the transfer of freight from road to rail.
- New Wales & Borders franchise operator
- Direct rail services to Liverpool via the Halton Curve.

On 6 March 2017, Ken Skates, Cabinet Secretary for Economy and Infrastructure, announced the Welsh Government's vision on transport improvements across North Wales. At the time of the announcement, he stated that he had already committed £600 million for transport infrastructure improvement across North Wales, with talks over procuring a further £41 million of EU funding for the scheme, ongoing at the time.

Developed proposals include; a new station (provisionally named as Deeside Parkway) at Deeside Industrial Park, upgrades to railway stations, and new bus routes to improve connections. Improved connectivity between bus and rail transport at Wrexham General, and between rail services on the North Wales Coast Line and Borderlands Line at Shotton, in addition to further upgrades to existing rail routes are also proposed.

As part of the new Wales & Borders franchise, first awarded to KeolisAmey Wales in 2018, although succeeded by Welsh Government-owned Transport for Wales Rail from 2021, it has been announced that the modernisation of the Borderlands Line between Wrexham and Bidston will be the first phase of the North Wales Metro. Electro-diesel Class 230 Metro trains made by Vivarail, were planned to be deployed in 2019, but were delayed to 2022, due to slippage, staff training issues and COVID-19, with services to increase to 2 trains per hour in each direction initially expected from 2021, one as a stopping service and the other as an express with limited stops.

In April 2018, a cash boost of £1.2 million was award to the proposed scheme which included a new station at Deeside.

On 19 December 2019, it was announced as part of a draft budget from the Welsh Government, that the plans for the development of the North Wales Metro received a £20 million boost. The funding would be used to improve all modes of transport, such as cycle routes, bus services, station investments, and train services, with the scheme focussed on delivering these improvements to North East Wales.

On 22 May 2020, a grant of £3.5 million was announced to boost the development of the metro by the Welsh Government, as part of the £30 million allocated to nearly 40 local transport improvements across Wales. The £3.5 million will be used on 10 schemes in four council areas.

On 17 June 2020, an investment of £450,000 was made from the funding for the North Wales Metro, to provide new electric buses serving on routes to Buckley and Treuddyn, with additional electric charging infrastructure for the maintenance of the electric buses.

Work began in June 2020, for the construction of a new Park and Ride in Deeside Industrial Park. The scheme is aimed to ease congestion in the industrial park, with a regular shuttle bus service travelling between the Park and Ride to the three zones of the industrial park to encourage the use of public transport.

On 22 October 2020, £4 million had been allocated from the Welsh Government to Transport for Wales, for the work on the North Wales Metro. The work included improved rail services and stations, and Active Travel access developed in collaboration with local authorities, with a review of the bus network across the region to be completed with options for improvement. Other funding was also given to local transport projects operated by local authorities.

=== North Wales Metro ===
==== 2021-29 plan ====
In February 2021, Transport for Wales Rail was transferred to a subsidiary of Transport for Wales taking over from KeolisAmey Wales. The Welsh Government-owned public rail operator would operate the Metro alongside the Wales and Borders franchise.

===== 2021 Metro Development Plan =====
In March 2021, Transport for Wales published their 2021 Metro Development Plan on the three regional metros of Wales. It described the metro to be in its initial phases and current work is focused on setting the foundations of the project. The plan states that the metro aims to reduce rural isolation, help reduce carbon emissions, encourage transport-oriented development and regeneration, and open up new opportunities in employment, business, and leisure across the region and north-west England. Described by the plan to help the development of the region's economy and increase sustainability in the tourism sector of the region. Alongside the introduction of new trains to the Borderlands line from late 2021 (since delayed to 2022), the plan stated that TfW would be further improving the Wales and Borders network through the introduction of new trains, improving transport integration and connection at Shotton and Wrexham General, and general public transport improvements in and around the Deeside Enterprise Zone (containing Deeside Industrial Park).

The plan highlighted TfW's "emerging priority projects" focused on four sectors of transport; Rail, Bus and Integration, Local, and Other. These projects were described by TfW to be ones they are "keen to take forward and research in more detail through business cases and scheme proposals, in partnership with the region and local authorities". In the rail sector these proposals include;

- The introduction of regional and express services on the North Wales Coast Line
- Potential new railway or railway-interchange (marked with an *) stations at:
  - Deeside Industrial Park
  - Bangor*
  - Shotton*
  - Greenfield
  - Broughton
  - Wrexham South (later described as a "Longer term project" i.e. post-2029), previously proposed separately and later cancelled in 2019, before being re-instated in the post-2029 plan
  - Wrexham North (later described as a "Longer term project" i.e. post-2029), previously proposed separately and later cancelled in 2019, before being re-instated in the post-2029 plan
- Improvements in capacity, operation and enhanced links to England's rail network (HS2/NPR/Crewe) at Chester.
- Rail improvements in the Wrexham area, in terms of capacity and reliability.
- Upgrading the Borderlands line, leading to a potential integration of the line with Merseyrail services.

In the bus and integration sector, the plan stated that TfW proposes to improve integration at Holyhead to increase inter-connectivity between the town, the port, rail and bus services, and to improve the design of the bus route network and rail integration at key hubs across North Wales. Local projects in the plan include; participating in the Snowdonia Park Sustainable Access project, local bus and active travel project in places such as Flint, Prestatyn and Llandudno, and exploring new park and ride opportunities in the region. Under "other" the plan stated that TfW is looking into rail innovations which can lead to a potential re-opening or new lines to places such as Amlwch on the former Anglesey Central Railway in the north of Anglesey.

On 19 March 2021, £25 million was allocated for the Wrexham Gateway project, a sister project of the Metro, focusing on developing the area around Wrexham General station, and forming a local transport hub.

On 24 March 2021, it was announced that a further £9 million from the Welsh Government would be put into the metro project. Of the £9 million, £1 million would be allocated for improvements in the rail journey times between Wrexham and Liverpool, £1.5 million towards improvements and increased interconnectivity at the station in Shotton, £670,000 towards the development of the new Deeside Parkway station, and £900,000 into a study on improving journey times and services along the North Wales Coast mainline. Additional funding was also allocated for sustainable transport and active travel improvements in the centres of Rhyl and Wrexham, and for an improved transport connectivity project in Bangor.

===== Previous 2029 plan =====
On 10 September 2021, the Welsh Government published their priority plans on the North Wales Metro up to 2029, ahead of a visit by Deputy Minister for Climate Change Lee Waters (who has responsibility for transport affairs in Wales) to Wrexham General, on the same day. His visit marked the works carried out by the government on the project following the £9 million injection into the scheme in March. During his visit, the deputy minister said "Our transport network will change the way we travel by creating modern, sustainable bus, rail and cycling and walking networks, creating a range of work and leisure opportunities while reducing the environmental impact.[...] [The transport network] will play a critical role in delivering the priorities and objectives of our ambitious new transport strategy, Y Llwybr Newydd and helping us meet our target of 45% of journeys being made by public transport or active travel by 2040, helping to reduce road congestion, carbon emissions and air pollution".

The plan set out more ambitious projects set out by the Welsh government, including:

- North Wales Coast Line electrification (Chester to Holyhead)
- Metro extensions to West Wales and north of Anglesey.
- New stations around Wrexham (North and South)

On these issues, Mr Waters stated that it was more likely that the extensions to West Wales, and north Anglesey would be a tram-like system due to financing and convenience. However, he stated further that efforts must also be taken to address the region's "fragmented" bus service system, which currently carries the bulk of public transport users in the region. These long-term investments, in particular concerning Network Rail infrastructure (such as the North Wales Coast Line), come under the responsibility of the UK Government. Mr Waters stated it was time for Wales to receive its fair share of transport funding, proportional to its population and trackage, which Waters state has been lacking in the past decade, leading to a £5 billion shortfall in transport infrastructure investment.

From 2021, funding is set to be allocated to other North Wales Metro projects, including:

Bus enhancements (£4.8 million) such as: Information screens across the TrawsCymru network, refurbishment of Bangor bus station, and new fflecsi schemes. The plan also sets out to encourage the use of park and ride, bus and active travel in Snowdonia National Park, as part of the Snowdonia Transport Strategy (£1 million+). Rail enhancements mentioned in the plan, include; railway station improvements including at Wrexham General, and accessibility improvements (£2.7 million), improved connectivity between Wrexham and Liverpool (£1 million+), an integrated station at Shotton (£1.5 million), the development of Deeside Parkway (£670,000), a study on the North Wales Coast Line–partly focussed on how to improve journey times (£900,000), and a further roll-out of integrated ticketing on buses region (£250,000). Pictures alongside the release back up proposals in the Metro Development Plan, with new stations at Greenfield, Broughton, and Deeside.

Initially planned for May 2022, Transport for Wales Rail were planned to increase the number of services on the Borderlands Line to two trains per hour, with the new fully rebuilt and refurbished Class 230 trains (New trains since delayed on the line to 2022). TfW described these trains to provide a faster service, increased capacity and better air conditioning. The request to increase services was impacted by the delay of the refurbished trains and a timetable conflict with freight traffic.

It was proposed, that from December 2022, direct services between Liverpool and Llandudno via the North Wales Coast, and Liverpool and Cardiff via Wrexham will be introduced to the rail network.

=== Network North Wales ===
The latest Network North Wales plan aims to develop an "integrated, high-frequency public transport network for North Wales", and also has "Metro at its heart". It additionally aims to improve connections between the region and Merseyside, Cheshire, the rest of Northern England and beyond. The plans were revealed in May 2025. It involves £2.1 billion, and would form part of Transport for Wales' T Network.

The programme uses the phrase "Metro is go", and describes it to mean, investment in infrastructure (to lead to more frequent rail services), North Wales–Liverpool rail connectivity, adding new bus and coach routes, bus and rail electrification investment, railway station improvements, and easier ticketing. The plan's delivery priorities were listed as Wrexham–Liverpool line upgrades (stations, services and Padeswood), bus enhancements, 50% more North Wales main line services, T13 TrawsCymru service, pay-as-you-go ticketing, and Wrexham–Chester services. While the development priorities were to develop new stations, the North Wales Access Improvement Fund, develop Metro further, more Chester capacity, enhancement plan for Marches line and North Wales main line, and the Electrification Innovation Fund.

The aims of the programme were split depending on when they aimed to deliver the improvements.

Six-month aims

- Establish the programme team, open Wrexham hub, some development work begins
- Discussion with community and local authorities on level crossing closures, and a revised memorandum of understanding with Liverpool City Region towards a commercial Heads of Terms
- Funding agreement for Padeswood
- New trains strategy
- Rename Borderlands line to the Wrexham to Liverpool line
- Explore North Wales–London connection improvements

1 year aims

- Improve stations on Wrexham to Liverpool line (Borderlands line)
- Analyse progress on Deeside station, look into a temporary station
- Double Wrexham–Chester train services
- 50% more Transport for Wales Rail services on North Wales Main Line
- New bus services in Wrexham and Deeside employment areas
- Begin roll out of pay as you go in the north-east.
- Applying "Metro" and "Network North Wales" branding to trains, railway stations and buses.
- Launch T13 Rhyl–Denbigh–Ruthin–Wrexham bus service
- Key gateway station development work
- Direct services between Llandudno and Liverpool

3 year aims

- Upgrade Padeswood, for more passenger and freight train capacity
- 2tph on Wrexham to Liverpool line
- Development work on electrification (including smart electrification)
- Improve safety access at Buckley railway station

5 year aims

- New railway stations, such as at Deeside Industrial Estate.
- Improved connections to Manchester Airport.
- Consistent timetable for the North Wales Main Line
- More new trains
- Prepare for North Wales electrification
- Signal upgrades at Gobowen, for more service capacity

By 2035

- North Wales electrification and new trains
- Chester station enhancement, for more capacity
- Wrexham General–Wrexham Central connectivity innovations
- 4tph between Wrexham and Liverpool
- Improved connections to Liverpool South Parkway
- Re-double track fully between Wrexham and Chester
- Increase services further on North Wales Main Line
- Accessibility improvements at stations, including level boarding

After 2035

- Metro-style services to all stations "south of Wrexham to Gobowen from Crewe"
- Tram–train connections to key settlements
- North–South Wales journey time improvements by developing Shotton Chord
- New stations north and south of Wrexham, including a A55 Parkway
- Improved connections to Warrington Bank Quay
- Resignalling and electrification of the Marches line
- Wrexham–Leeds northern line connections

== Improvements ==
=== Cycling ===
==== Active travel paths ====
According to Welsh Government officials, up to 10,000 cycle trips per month now go through Deeside Industrial Park following the construction of "active travel" paths, connecting people with the businesses present in the park.

=== Rail ===
==== New franchise operator ====
From 2018, KeolisAmey Wales took over the operations of the Wales and Borders franchise, under the terms of the contract, provisions for the North Wales Metro were included. Since succeeded by Welsh Government-owned Transport for Wales Rail.

==== Direct services ====
Direct train services between North East Wales and North West England have been established to increase the connectivity between the two regions as part of the Welsh Government's vision to develop the economy of the region by integrating it further with the Northern Powerhouse.

In May 2019, a Wrexham to Liverpool Lime Street direct service via the Halton Curve (upgraded in 2014 to accommodate such bi-daily services) was launched.

==== Station redevelopment ====
The Station Improvement Vision, a Transport for Wales redevelopment project, with first works in the stations of Llandudno, Abergele and Pensarn, and Wrexham General was launched in early 2021.

The project aims to provide spaces in the stations for community enterprises and local businesses. Facilities at Llandudno are to be refurbished to allow rooms to be converted into an employment cafe, offering assistance for those seeking employment, a Ready for Employment training programme, advice on work placements and volunteering arrangements, and skill-building workshops.

At Abergele and Pensarn, station rooms previously unused, such as the station's former booking office and the main building would be given a complete renovation into usable space. The rooms will be re-plastered, re-decorated, lighting and heating systems upgraded, with windows and doors repaired.

In January 2021, works to improve Wrexham General commenced, with them lasting through February, the works aimed to deliver key improvements to the customer areas of the station, such as a renovated and extended waiting area, new changing room and toilet refurbishment, increasing cycle parking capacity, and adding new recycling facilities to the station.

== Criticism ==
=== Non-inclusion of North West Wales ===
The project has garnered some criticism previously for largely focussing on North East Wales only, excluding the counties of North West Wales (Conwy, Gwynedd, and Isle of Anglesey). Plans to expand direct rail services from Liverpool to Llandudno, Conwy has since been put forward.

=== Lack of progress ===
On 18 June 2019, the leader of Flintshire Council, Ian Roberts (Labour), has complained over the lack of progress with the Metro, believing the Welsh Government to have not moved forward quickly enough with the proposals, despite committing money to the enhancements of roads and cycle routes in Flintshire. He said there had only been limited discussions over how the main elements of the project would be implemented, with him describing the project "actually very difficult to achieve...when there are only two railway lines".

=== Compared to South Wales ===
On 15 February 2021, Darren Millar, MS for Clwyd West, criticised the Welsh Government over their plans to only invest a total of the £50 million allocated to the North Wales Metro, in comparison to the £750 million for the South Wales Metro. He stated that "The people of North Wales deserve to know why the Welsh Government is investing £700 million more in a metro for the South than the one planned for here... They are sick of being the poor relation and the Welsh Government need to explain to them why North Wales is continually overlooked when it comes to funding.”

A spokesperson for the Welsh Government, said that they have been spending "unprecedented" amounts on the transport infrastructure of North Wales, including £135 million for the Caernarfon and Bontnewydd bypass, and £30 million for improvements on the A55 at Aber Tai'r Meibion.

On 21 October 2021, the Welsh Government confirmed only £50 million was committed to the North Wales Metro so far, in comparison the South Wales Metro was confirmed to receive £1 billion, and was accused of neglecting North Wales in favour for South Wales.

== See also ==
- South Wales Metro
