= Rossett railway station =

Former railway station in Wales

Rossett
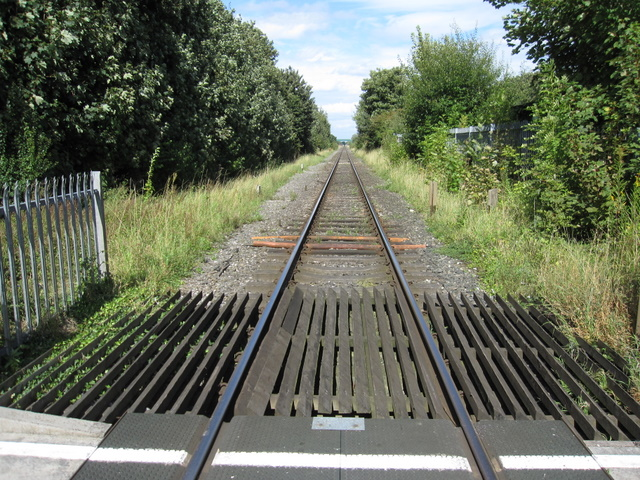
- Single-track near the former station site in 2009, north towards Chester, prior to track redoubling in 2017.

General information
- Location: Rossett, Wrexham County Borough; Wales
- Coordinates: 53.1083°N 2.9547°W
- Grid reference: SJ360572
- Platforms: 2

Other information
- Status: Disused

History
- Original company: Great Western Railway

Key dates
- 1846: Station opens
- 26 Oct 1964: Closed to Passengers
- 7 Oct 1968: Closed to Goods
Location

Rossett was a minor railway station located on the Great Western Railway's Paddington to Birkenhead line several miles north of Wrexham in Wales. The route is still open today as part of the Shrewsbury to Chester Line. Originally, there was a level crossing just south of the platforms but this has been reduced to the status of a foot and cycleway crossing. To the south of the station there were once goods loops on both sides of the line as well as extensive sidings on the east side. Part of the old Up (southbound) platform still survives. The double track on the Wrexham to Chester section was singled in 1983 but has been redoubled between Rossett and Saltney, with work finally completed in April 2017 (a year later than scheduled).

== Historical services ==
Rossett station was not served by the express trains that ran on this route and only local trains stopped here.

According to the Official Handbook of Stations the following classes of traffic were being handled at this station in 1956: G, P, F, L, H, C and there was a one-ton crane.

== Re-opening plan ==
According to the Scott Wilson Report compiled for the Chester to Shrewsbury Rail Partnership, Rossett is one of the sites on the line being considered for the re-opening of the station. (The report can be downloaded from the Chester to Shrewsbury Rail Partnership website link below). Some proposals for a "Wrexham North railway station" use the former Rossett railway station site.

== Neighbouring stations ==
Preceding station	Historical railways	Following station
Gresford	Great Western Railway; Shrewsbury to Chester Line	Pulford
