= Saltney railway station =

Former railway station in England

Saltney

General information
- Location: Saltney, Cheshire West and Chester; England
- Coordinates: 53.1795°N 2.9188°W
- Grid reference: SJ386651
- Platforms: 2

Other information
- Status: Disused

History
- Original company: Great Western Railway

Key dates
- 1846: Station opens
- 1 January 1917: station closed
- 4 July 1932: station opens
- 12 September 1960: Closed to Passengers
- 3 April 1967: Closed to Goods
Location

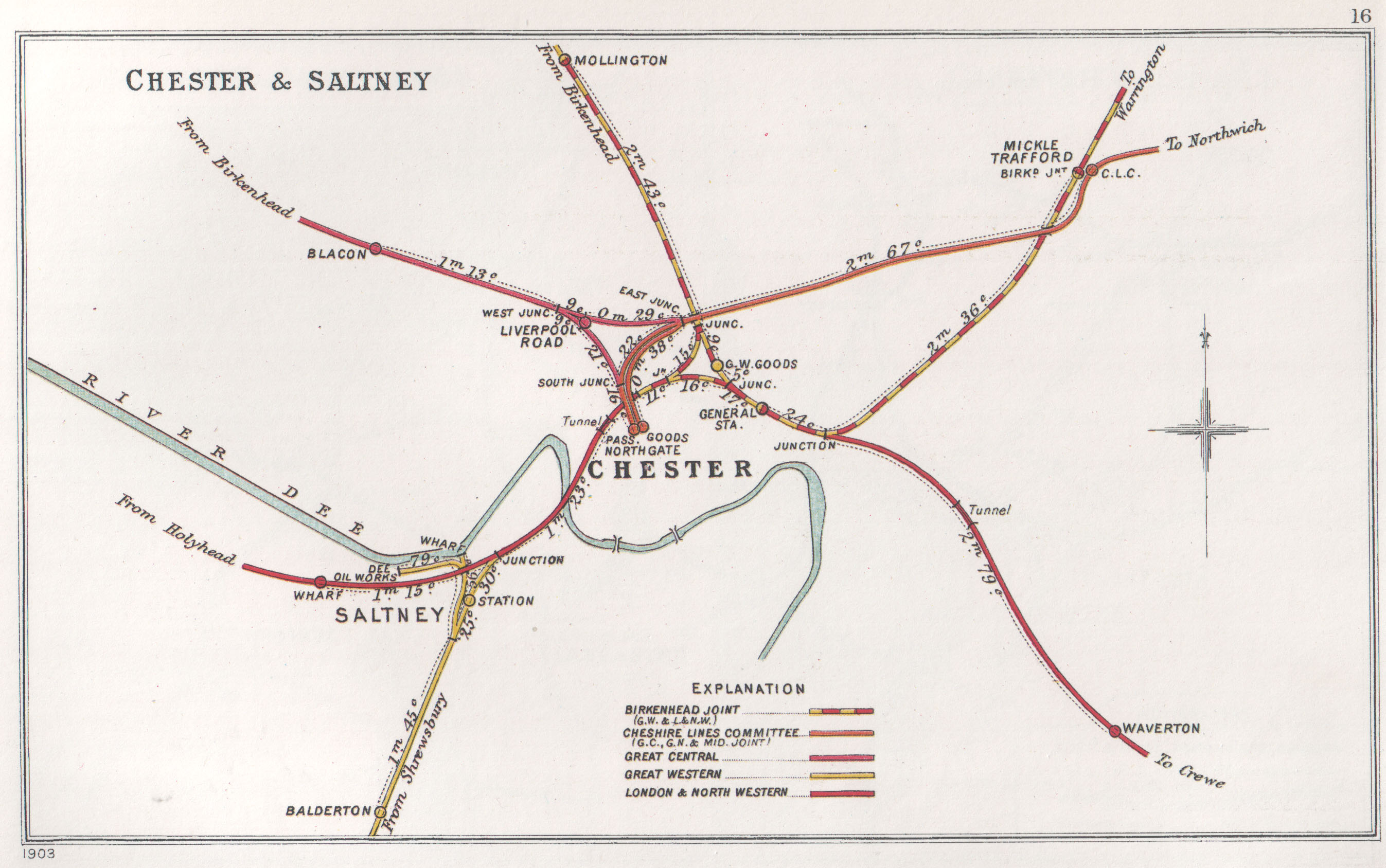
Diagram of railway junctions around Chester & Saltney, 1914

Saltney was a minor railway station located on the Great Western Railway's Paddington to Birkenhead line a few miles west of Chester, England. Although the station is now closed, the route is still open today as part of the Shrewsbury to Chester Line.

== History ==
The GWR and the London and North Western Railway had raced from London to develop their services throughout Wales, and onto the important shipping facilities on the Mersey. After the North Wales Coast Line to Holyhead had been incorporated into the LNWR, the two companies agreed compromise in the Chester area, thereby jointly owning and operating the Birkenhead Joint Railway north from Chester to Birkenhead with its branches from Hooton to Helsby and Parkgate (later extended to West Kirby), and from Chester to Warrington.

Although Saltney hence was a small station, Saltney Junction just to its north became important in the operations of the GWR, as it was where tariffs became applicable for the shipment of traffic over the jointly operated lines.

Express trains on the route did not call here, only local trains. According to the Official Handbook of Stations the following classes of traffic were being handled at this station in 1956: G & P, and there was a 6-ton crane.

== Present ==
Nothing now remains of the station, on what is an abandoned expanse of waste ground. The double track on the Chester to Wrexham section was made into a single track in 1983, and subsequently work to redouble the track completed in April 2017. Network Rail had originally expected to start running trains over the redoubled track in November 2015. There is a proposal to open a new station at Lache a short distance to the south.

== Neighbouring stations ==
Preceding station	Historical railways	Following station
Balderton	Great Western Railway; Shrewsbury to Chester Line	Chester
