= Wrexham North railway station =

Proposed railway station in Wales

Wrexham North Gogledd Wrecsam

General information
- Other names: North Wrexham; Wrexham North Parkway
- Location: Wrexham County Borough; Wales
- System: Regional (proposed)
- Line: Shrewsbury–Chester line

Key dates
- July 2015: First proposed

Wrexham North (Welsh: Gogledd Wrecsam; also proposed as North Wrexham and Wrexham North Parkway; Welsh: Parcffordd Gogledd Wrecsam) is a proposed railway station on the Shrewsbury–Chester line, situated between Rossett and Wrexham, in Wrexham County Borough, Wales. As of January 2022, there is no definitive site for the proposed station, with proposals including: the former Rossett railway station or a station near Pandy, Wrexham and Gresford. Unless construction of the station south of Rossett coincides with the full or partial dualling of the currently single track railway line towards Stansty, Wrexham North may be a single platform station or if situated at Rossett Junction be linked by a single track southwards to Wrexham.

Wrexham North forms part of Transport for Wales' long-term goals for the North Wales Metro.

== History ==
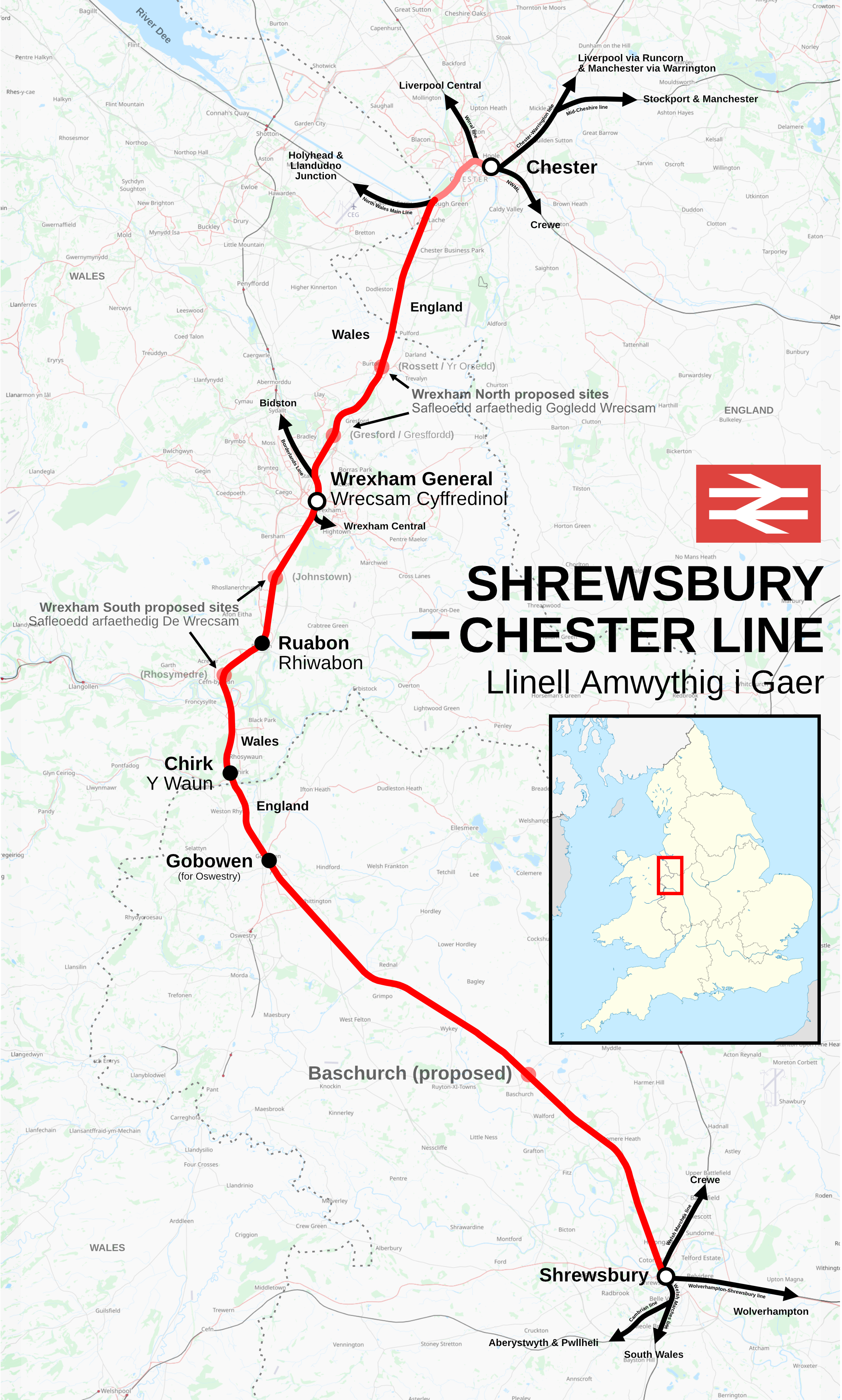
Map of Shrewsbury to Chester line, with two potential sites for Wrexham North marked

A "North Wrexham" station was first proposed in July 2015, in the Welsh Government's National Transport Finance Plan 2015. In which five stations were shortlisted in North Wales for consideration by the government.

In April 2017, the station was placed on the Welsh Government's May 2017 stage-one assessment of new rail stations in Wales. The station was forecasted in the assessment to have annual passenger numbers of between 57,000 and 70,000 based on both 2011–12 model figures and the growth in passenger numbers between 2011 and 2016.

For stage 2 of the assessment, "North Wrexham" was allocated the old Rossett railway station site, located where the recently dualled railway tracks from Saltney Junction merge into a single track towards Wrexham. The assessment stated that benefits for the station to be located here include: serving Rossett village, potential park and ride operations for employment connections to Wrexham, Chester and Liverpool, proximity to the A483 dual carriageway, and potential land availability for car parking. The assessment stated that the station would face capacity issues as the line southwards to Wrexham is only a single track, and therefore studies on the impact the proposed station would have on rail timetables would have to be conducted. The impact the station would have on the nearby level crossing, and the station's gradient were also mentioned to require evaluating.

In April 2019, the Welsh Government announced that Wrexham North, alongside Wrexham South and Llangefni were to be dropped from the list (Broughton was dropped earlier), and would not proceed further in the assessment. Deeside Parkway was the only station in north Wales to remain on the list.

As rail infrastructure is not devolved in Wales, funding for the construction of a new railway station lies with the UK Government's Department for Transport (DfT) and is delivered by Network Rail. DfT would receive advice from Network Rail on the feasibility of the station.

In 2021, the proposed station re-emerged in Transport for Wales' Metro Development Plan published in March 2021, and the Future Developments plan for the North Wales Metro published in September 2021. The accompanying maps for the latter, used to represent Transport for Wales' long-term ambitions in the region, include a proposed station located north of Wrexham, near Gresford, termed "Wrexham North". The longer-term plans (in comparison to the 2029 plans released on the same day), do not include a proposed date for the project and are accompanied by other projects, some critics may describe as being too ambitious.

== Proposed location ==
There is no definitive location for the station as of January 2022. Older proposals advocate for the use of the former Rossett railway station (in conjunction with re-opening proposals for Rossett station itself), but newer maps of the proposed location show it to be more southerly towards Wrexham.

Preceding station	Future services	Following station
Wrexham General	Transport for Wales Rail Shrewsbury–Chester line	Chester
