= North East Wales =

Area of Wales

Coordinates: 53.1°N 3.1°W

Map of North East Wales

North East Wales (Welsh: Gogledd-Ddwyrain Cymru) is an area or region of Wales, commonly defined as a grouping of the principal areas of Denbighshire, Flintshire, and Wrexham County Borough in the north-east of the country. These principal areas comprise most (excluding Colwyn, and parts of Glyndŵr) of the former administrative county of Clwyd. It is bordered by Conwy, and Gwynedd, in North West Wales to the west, Powys, in Mid Wales to the south, the English counties of Cheshire, and Shropshire to the east, and the Irish Sea, and Dee estuary to the north. It is the more urban, densely populated, and industrial part of the north Wales geographic region, centred on the city of Wrexham and the towns of Rhyl and Prestatyn, and the conurbation of Deeside. The region's close links with North West England in general and Merseyside in particular (together as the "Mersey-Dee" economic sub-region) are crucial to the region's economy.

The Clwydian Range and Dee Valley Area of Outstanding Natural Beauty is located in the region. Other attractions include historical buildings such as Chirk Castle, and Erddig in Wrexham, valley towns such as Corwen and Llangollen, and the Pontcysyllte Aqueduct and Canal World Heritage Site.

The North East Wales Metro is a transport improvement project for the region. It is in concept, a multi-modal system with a combination of bus, heavy rail and light rail services linking major settlements and employment areas of the region, with hubs located in Wrexham, Chester and Deeside, in addition to further connections to Liverpool. The economic strategy for the region is for the further integration of North Wales, with Northern England, as part of the Northern Powerhouse project. The main roads in the area are the A55, A494, and A483.

On 22 November 2023, Wrexham and Flintshire were announced to be part of a "North East Wales Investment Zone".

== Usage and definition ==
The term North East Wales is used by the Welsh Government in the Wales Spatial Plan and the BBC. Some rarer definitions of North East Wales, only included Flintshire and Wrexham. It is mostly used as a regional grouping of local authorities.

The North East Wales NHS Trust existed from 1 April 1999 to 1 July 2008, when it merged with Conwy & Denbighshire NHS Trust to form the North Wales NHS Trust (now Betsi Cadwaladr LHB).

== Proposed north-east council(s) ==
In 1963, in a review of local government in Wales, the Local Government Commission for Wales proposed a single North East Wales "administrative area" containing Denbighshire, Flintshire and Montgomeryshire.

In April 2013, it was announced that a major review was to be undertaken into the organisation of local government in Wales. A report on the findings was released on 20 January 2014. It recommended that the number of councils in Wales be reduced, through mergers rather than through boundary changes, from the current 22 to either 10, 11 or 12. In November 2015, a draft local government bill, presented by the Welsh Government, contained two proposals, a 8 and 9 local authority model.

As part of the proposed eight local authorities model, the 3 existing local authorities of North East Wales, would be combined into one authority, spanning all of North East Wales and therefore most of the former county of Clwyd. Although, no name was proposed for this county.

The alternative proposal, a 9 local authority model, applies to a part of North East Wales, in which Denbighshire would be merged westwards with Conwy instead, leaving the remaining council spanning only Flintshire and Wrexham.

In January 2017, the proposals for local authority mergers were formally dropped following the publication of a white paper, with the number of councils to remain at 22, unless two or more local authorities wish to pursue a voluntary merger. Instead, proposals for the formation of regional bodies to encourage better collaboration between existing local authorities, was put forward.

A subsequent 2018 green paper made the case for a reduction in the number of local authorities from 22 to 10 and suggested three possible approaches; a system of voluntary mergers, a phased approach with authorities merging in either 2022 or 2026 or a comprehensive system of mergers to occur in 2022. In relation to North East Wales, it followed the earlier 9 local authority model, with Conwy-Denbighshire and Flintshire-Wrexham.

The Local Government and Elections (Wales) Bill, 2019, lacked any provisions on restructuring local councils but did contain mechanisms that would allow two or more authorities to merge on a voluntary basis. It also aimed to create a framework for joint regional coordination between local authorities. The bill was enacted in 2021.

== See also ==
- South East Wales
- North West Wales
- Mid Wales
- South West Wales
- North East Wales Metro
