= Chirk railway station =

Railway station in Wrexham, Wales

Chirk Welsh: Y Waun
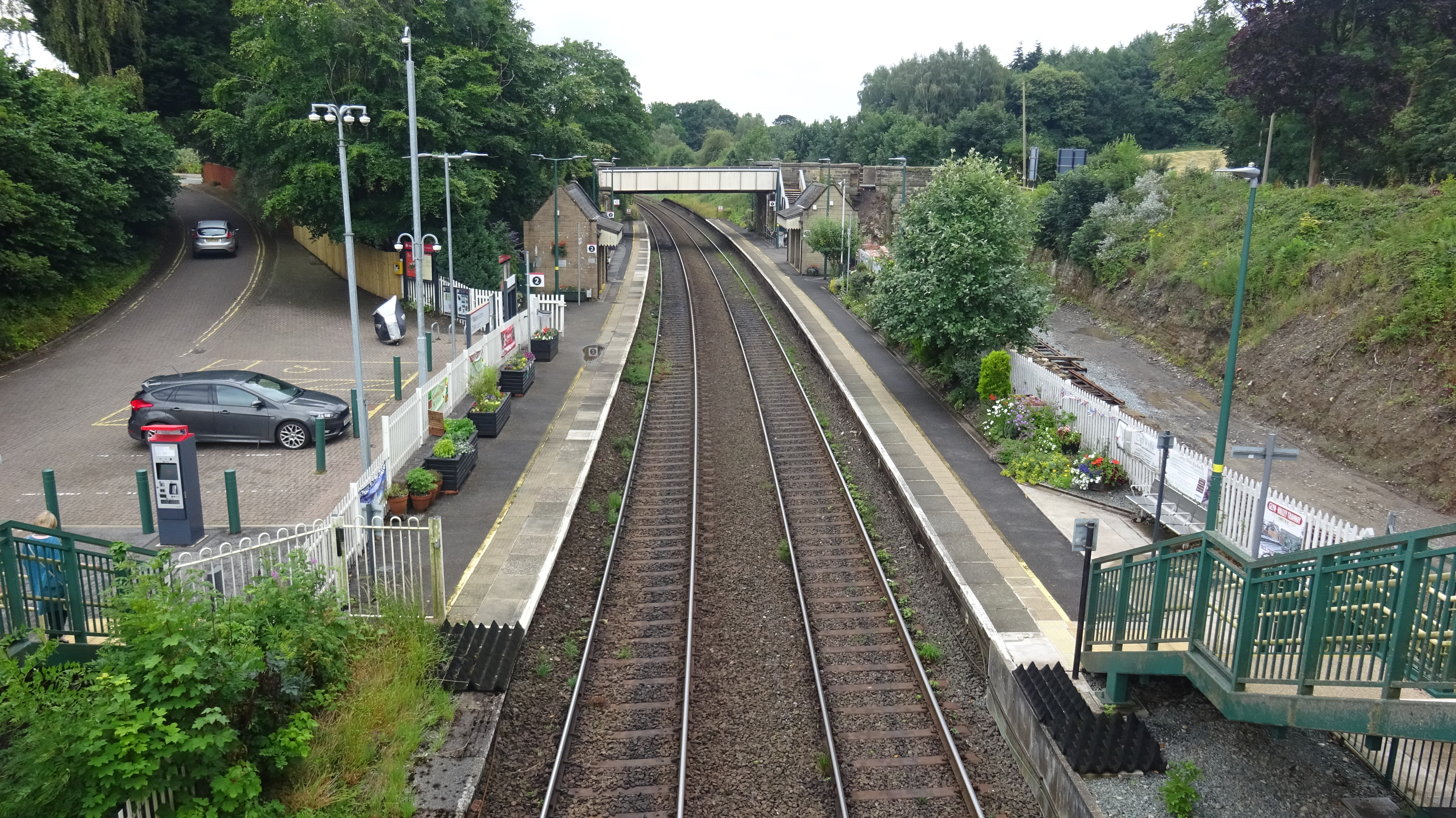

General information
- Location: Chirk, Wrexham; Wales
- Coordinates: 52.933°N 3.066°W
- Grid reference: SJ284378
- Managed by: Transport for Wales
- Line: Shrewsbury–Chester
- Platforms: 2

Other information
- Station code: CRK
- Classification: DfT category F2

History
- Original company: Shrewsbury, Oswestry and Chester Junction Railway
- Pre-grouping: Great Western Railway

Key dates
- 12 October 1848: Station opens
- 13 July 1964: Closed to goods
- 1 March 1974: Unstaffed

Passengers
- 2020/21: ▼14,788
- 2021/22: ▲57,766
- 2022/23: ▲73,002
- 2023/24: ▲83,562
- 2024/25: ▲0.107 million
Location
Notes
- Passenger statistics from the Office of Rail and Road

Chirk railway station (Welsh: Y Waun) serves the town of Chirk, Wrexham County Borough, Wales. The station is on the Shrewsbury to Chester Line that is part of the former Great Western Railway mainline route from London Paddington to Birkenhead Woodside. The original 19th-century (Grade II listed) Chirk / Y Waun station building was demolished in 1987, without consultation, by the local council.

Chirk was also the eastern terminus and transfer point for the Glyn Valley Tramway.

== Historical services ==
According to the Official Handbook of Stations the following classes of traffic were being handled at this station in 1956: G, P, F, L, H, C and there was a 15 cwt crane. At one time there was also a private siding into the Cadbury's factory from where cocoa liquor was sent to the chocolate factory at Bournville.

The railway itself superseded the Llangollen Canal, which runs parallel to the railway through Chirk, for the transportation of coal and other goods.

== Facilities ==
The station is unstaffed (and has been since 1974) but has a ticket vending machine where passengers may buy or collect pre-booked tickets before boarding. Stone waiting shelters are provided on both platforms, along with a fully accessible ramped footbridge linking them – this was installed in 2015 as part of a £2 million Welsh Assembly-funded station improvement project. Train running information is provided via the CIS displays, automated announcements and timetable posters.

== Current services ==
Passenger

Trains run on two routes operated by Transport for Wales:

- Hourly northbound service to Holyhead via Wrexham General and Chester.
- Hourly southbound service to Shrewsbury then continuing alternately to give a two-hourly service to both Birmingham International via Birmingham New Street and Cardiff Central via Hereford.

Some early morning & late evening trains run only between Shrewsbury and either Wrexham General or Chester only, whilst there is a single late evening service northbound to Manchester Piccadilly on weekdays only. Sundays see a two-hourly service to Chester & Birmingham International with a limited number of services to Holyhead & Cardiff.

Freight

To the north of Chirk station on the Up (southbound) side of the line is a private siding into the Kronospan chipboard factory. The siding receives a trainload of softwood from Kingmoor Yard, Cumbria five days a week (Monday to Friday), and additionally, between the months of April and October, up to three trains a week of softwood from Ribblehead, North Yorkshire. Since 2007 these timber trains have been operated to the Chirk Kronospan factory by Colas Rail Ltd.

| Preceding station | National Rail | Following station |
|---|---|---|
| Gobowen | Transport for Wales; Shrewsbury to Chester Line | Ruabon |
| | Historical railways | |
| Trehowell Halt | Great Western Railway; Shrewsbury to Chester Line | Whitehurst Halt |

== Gallery ==
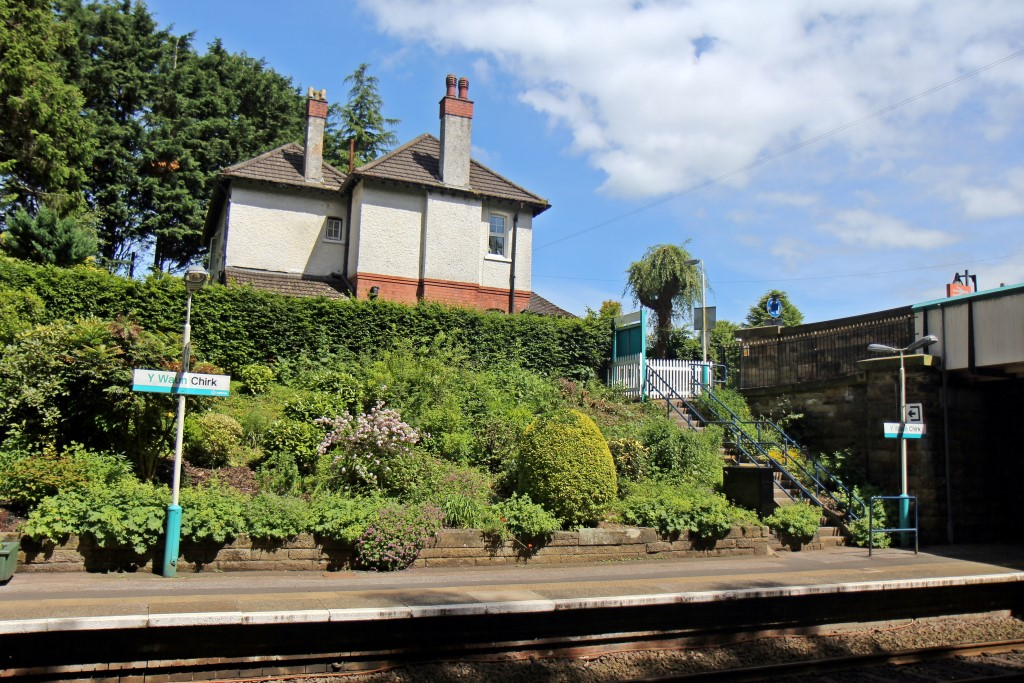
The Friends of Chirk Station maintain the flowerbeds.

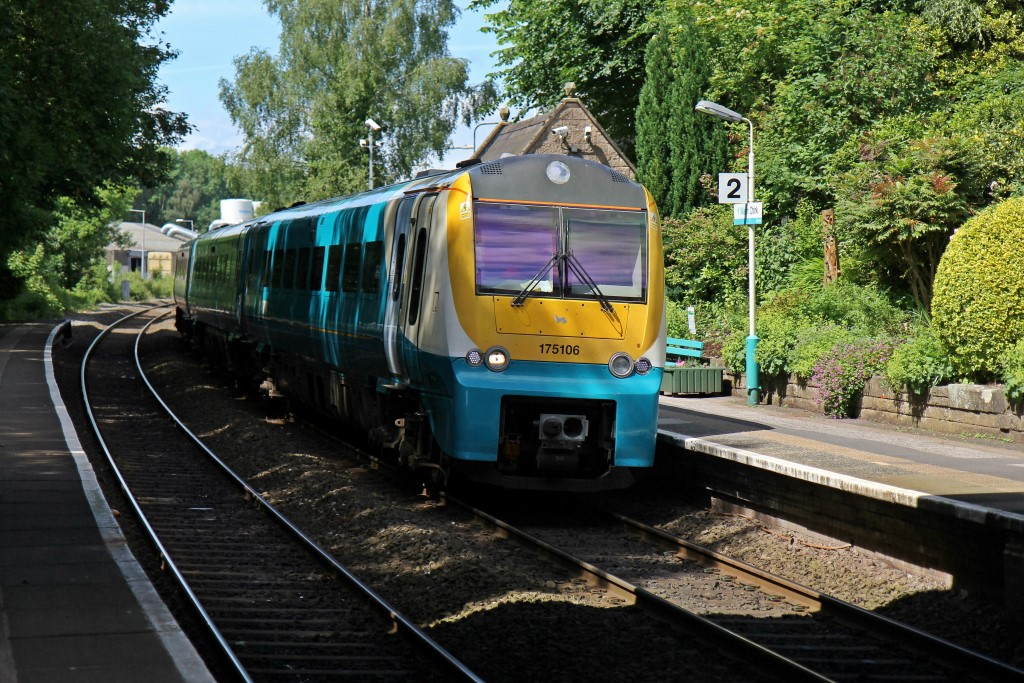
An Arriva Trains Wales Class 175 at platform 2

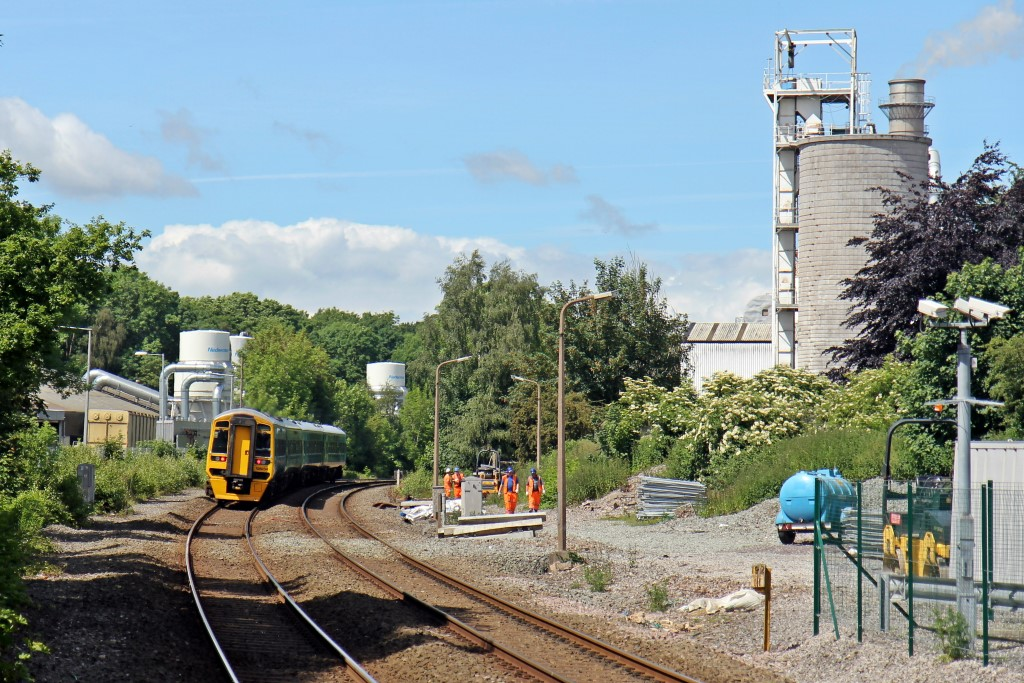
An Arriva Trains Wales Class 158 leaves the station heading north, away from the camera, towards Ruabon. The Kronospan factory is to the right.

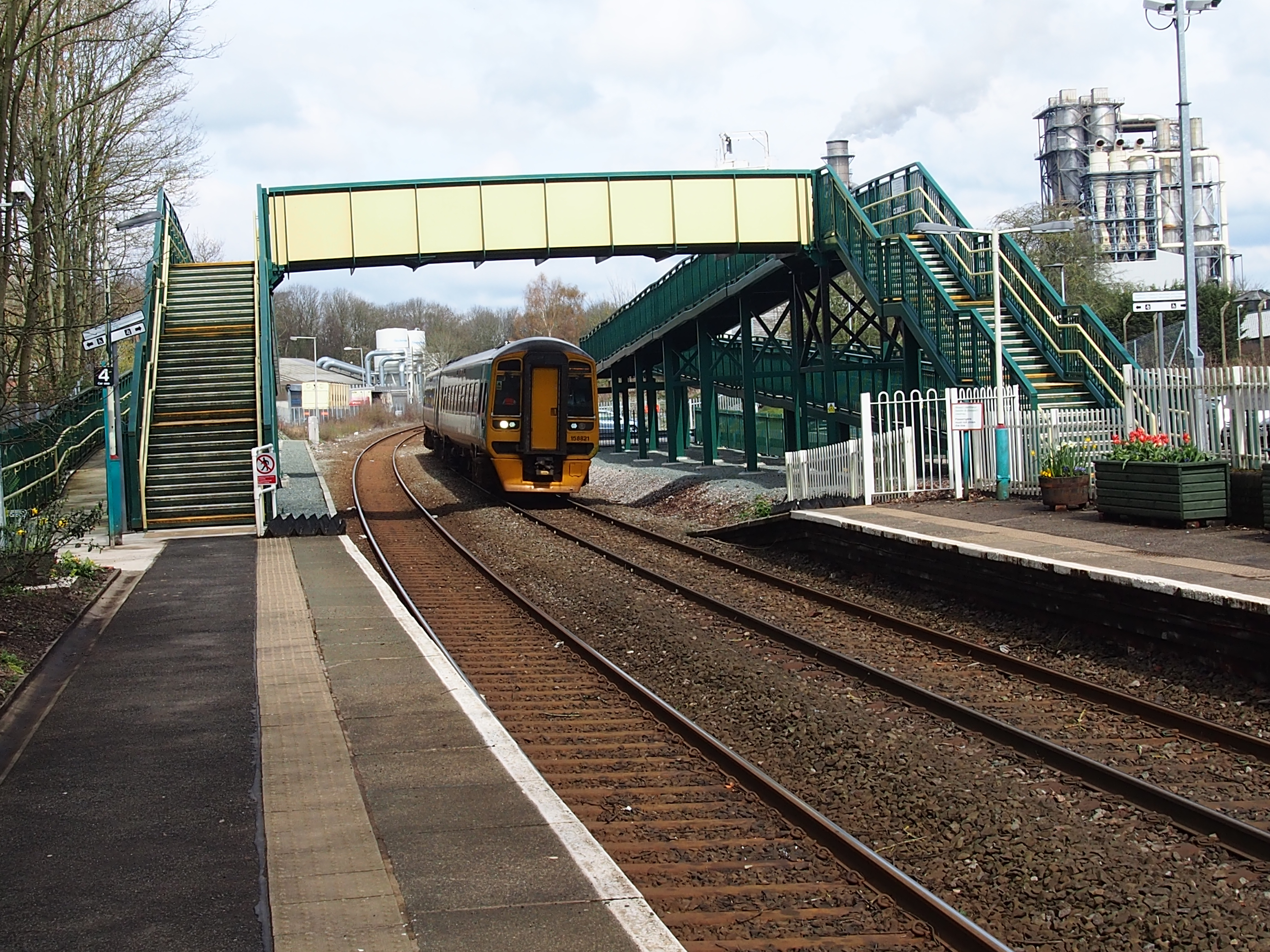
Fully accessible ramped footbridge, installed in 2015
