= Ruabon railway station =

Railway station in Wrexham, Wales

Ruabon Welsh: Rhiwabon
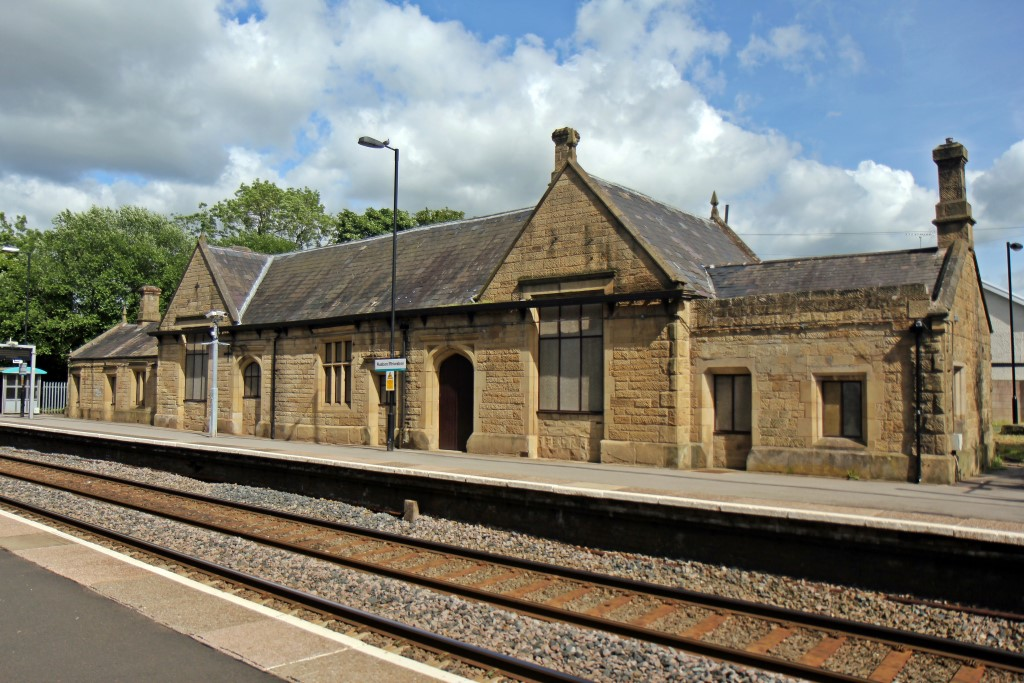
- The station building

General information
- Location: Ruabon, Wrexham; Wales
- Coordinates: 52.987176°N 3.043363°W
- Grid reference: SJ303438
- Manager: Transport for Wales
- Line: Shrewsbury–Chester
- Platforms: 2

Other information
- Station code: RUA
- Classification: DfT category F1

History
- Opened: 4 November 1846

Passengers
- 2020/21: ▼20,632
- 2021/22: ▲77,920
- 2022/23: ▲90,894
- 2023/24: ▲97,222
- 2024/25: ▲0.117 million

Listed Building – Grade II
- Feature: Ruabon Railway Station
- Designated: 24 February 1983
- Reference no.: 1719
Location
Notes
- Passenger statistics from the Office of Rail and Road

Ruabon railway station (Welsh: Rhiwabon) is a combined rail and bus interchange serving Ruabon, Wrexham County Borough, Wales. It is the second busiest station in Wrexham County Borough in terms of passenger journeys, after the mainline station, Wrexham General. It is on the Shrewsbury to Chester Line, which is part of the former Great Western Railway mainline route from London Paddington to Birkenhead Woodside which lasted until 1967.

== History ==
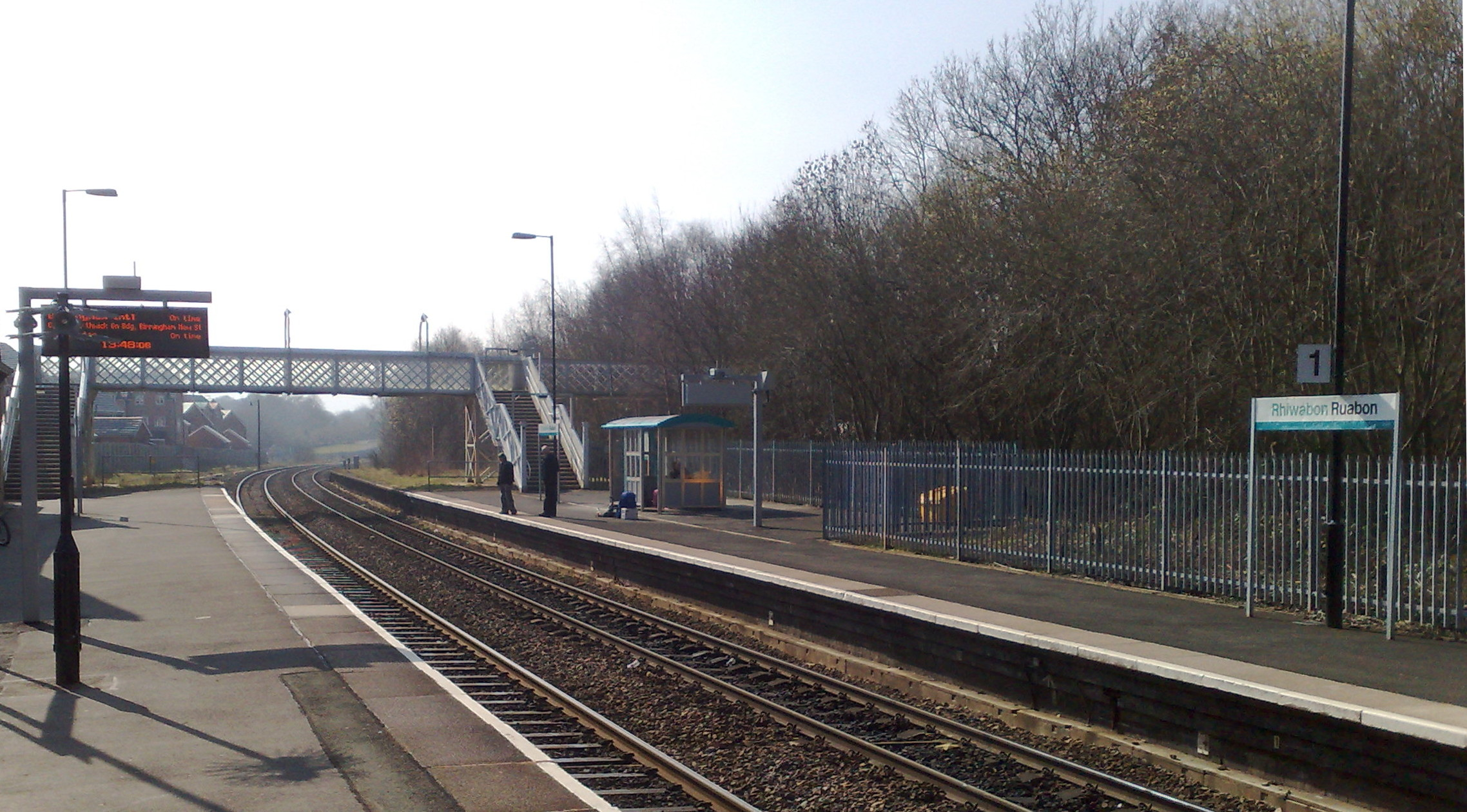
A fenced-off portion of the passenger footbridge leads to the disused platform

Ruabon station was originally larger than at present, with an extensive marshalling yard with a turntable and goods depot accompanying it, and was the terminus of the Ruabon to Barmouth line which ran via Llangollen, Corwen and Dolgellau. This branch line was a victim of the Beeching cuts in the 1960s, closing to passengers in 1965 and completely three years later. The bay platform serving this route can still be seen at the station, whilst the old goods yard has been redeveloped as a housing estate.

The original station building was Italianate in style and was designed by the architect Thomas Penson and opened on 4 November 1846. However, this was replaced by the current neo-Tudor style stone buildings, designed by Henry Robertson, in 1860. In 1870, refreshment rooms were added between the platforms serving Chester and Barmouth.

Following further cuts in the national railway service, Ruabon station became an unstaffed halt in 1974. Only parts of both main platforms are now in use.

In 2009, Ruabon station was refurbished at a cost of £70,000. New shelters, lighting and passenger information system screens were provided as part of the Welsh Government-funded project.

== Facilities ==
As noted, the station is unstaffed but has a ticket vending machine where tickets must be purchased or collected before boarding. The main buildings on platform 2 are privately occupied. Train running information is offered via digital displays, automatic announcements, timetable posters and customer help points on each platform. Step-free access is only provided on platform 2, as platform 1 can only be reached via a footbridge with stairs. Ruabon Station is the only station on the Chester-Shrewsbury Line without step-free access. The stairs cause major problems for the disabled with passengers wishing to alight here being advised to go to Wrexham and return on the next train south. Access for those with prams and pushchairs is also very difficult if not impossible and a struggle for those with luggage or those less mobile.

== Services ==
Currently, trains run on two routes operated by Transport for Wales:

- 1tph to Wrexham General; usually continues to Chester and Holyhead
- 1tph to Shrewsbury; usually continues to either Birmingham International, Cardiff Central via Hereford, or occasionally Swansea (two-hourly to each)

A two-hourly service operates on Sundays to Chester and Birmingham International, with limited additional services to Cardiff and Holyhead.

Until January 2011 Wrexham & Shropshire provided regular daily services between Wrexham and London. This service ceased due to a continuing loss being made by the company.

Preceding station	National Rail	Following station
Chirk	Transport for Wales; Shrewsbury to Wrexham General Line	Wrexham General
	Historical railways	
Rhosymedre Halt	Great Western Railway; Shrewsbury to Chester Line	Wynnville Halt
Acrefair	Great Western Railway; Ruabon to Barmouth Line	Terminus

== Connections ==
The station is served by TrawsCymru routes T3 and T12, and Arriva Buses Wales services 2/2A/2C and 5/5C serve the station indirectly, through a stop on High Street.
