= Shrewsbury–Chester line =

Railway line in England and Wales

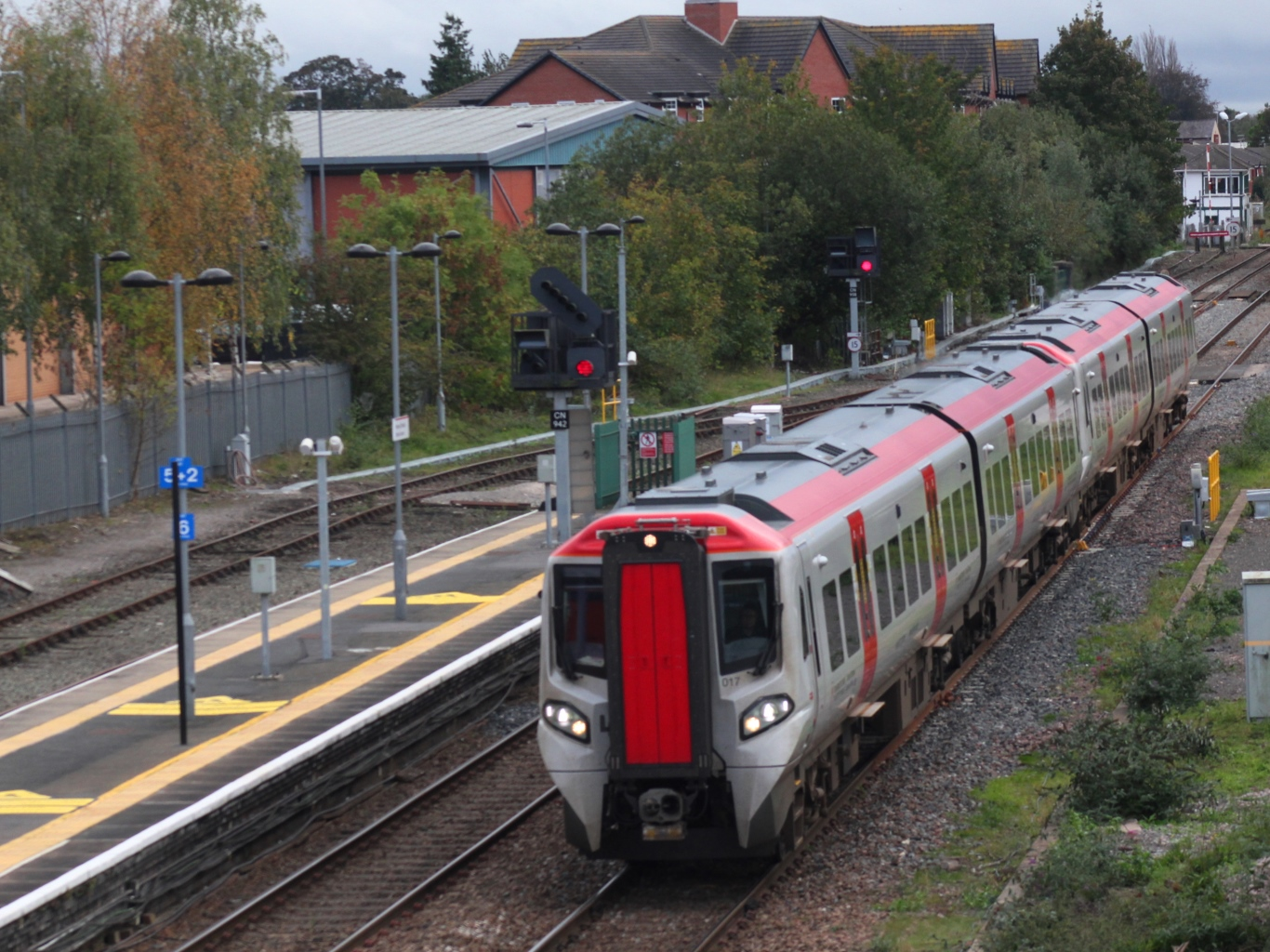
- Transport for Wales' 197015 & 017 at Wrexham General with a service from Cardiff to Holyhead.

Overview
- Owner: Network Rail
- Locale: Regions: North West England, North East Wales, and West Midlands Local authorities: Cheshire West and Chester, Wrexham County Borough and Shropshire
- Termini: Shrewsbury; Chester
- Stations: Gobowen, Chirk, Ruabon and Wrexham General

Service
- Type: Heavy Rail
- System: National Rail (Wales & Borders franchise)
- Operator(s): Transport for Wales, Avanti West Coast
- Rolling stock: Class 67 locomotive + Mark 4 carriages, Class 150 Sprinter, Class 153 Super Sprinter, Class 158 Express Sprinter, Class 197 Civity, Class 805 Evero

History
- Opened: 1846

Technical
- Number of tracks: Mostly double track between Saltney Junction and Abbey Foregate Junction, with a single track between Rossett Junction and Wrexham General.
- Character: Main line, Commuter Rail, Freight
- Track gauge: 1,435 mm (4 ft 8 1/2 in) standard gauge
- Operating speed: 50 mph (80 km/h), 70 mph (110 km/h), 90 mph or 140 km/h.
Route map
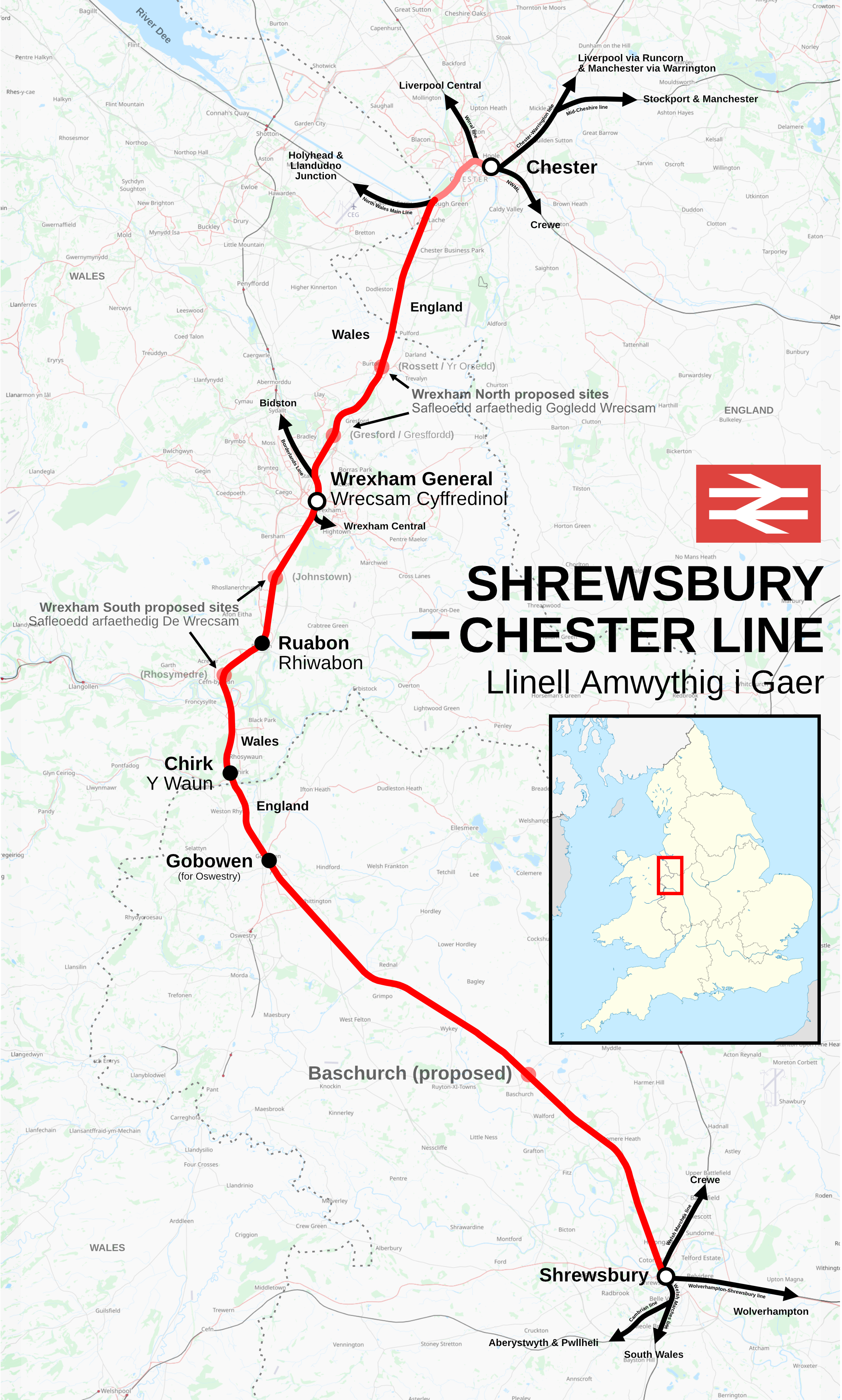

The Shrewsbury–Chester line is a railway line between Chester and Shrewsbury in England, with the line passing through Wrexham in Wales. Passenger train services are operated by Transport for Wales Rail between Chester, in the north, and Shrewsbury, in the south, as part of the Wales & Borders franchise. Some additional services, starting part way along the line to London Euston via Chester are operated by Avanti West Coast. The line was built in 1846 by the Shrewsbury and Chester Railway, with the engineer for the line being Henry Robertson, a partner in locomotive builders Beyer Peacock, while the contractor was Thomas Brassey in partnership with William Mackenzie and Robert Stephenson. The line is part of Transport for Wales' North Wales Metro improvement programme.

The line has six stations, equally distributed between England and Wales. There are proposals to open stations on the line in Baschurch (by re-opening Baschurch railway station) and in the north and south of Wrexham.

The line was formerly double-track for its entire length, however, 9.5 miles (15.3 km) of the line between Wrexham and Saltney Junction was reduced to a single-track in the 1980s. This was partly reversed in 2017, with the re-doubling of 5 miles (8.0 km) of the single-track section between Saltney Junction to Rossett Junction into double-track. The infrastructural work was carried out by Network Rail and funded by the Welsh Government. The re-doubling was completed in April 2017, with the project described to be an effort to increase services between Wrexham and Chester and improving certain sections of line to allow trains to run at 90 mph. The remaining 4 miles (6.4 km) of track between Rossett Junction and just north of Wrexham General remains single-track. The line used to extend to Chester directly, however the section of track between Saltney Junction and Chester railway station was reduced from two double-tracks, sharing with the North Wales Coast Line, to a single double-track now considered only part of the North Wales Coast Line by Network Rail.

== History ==
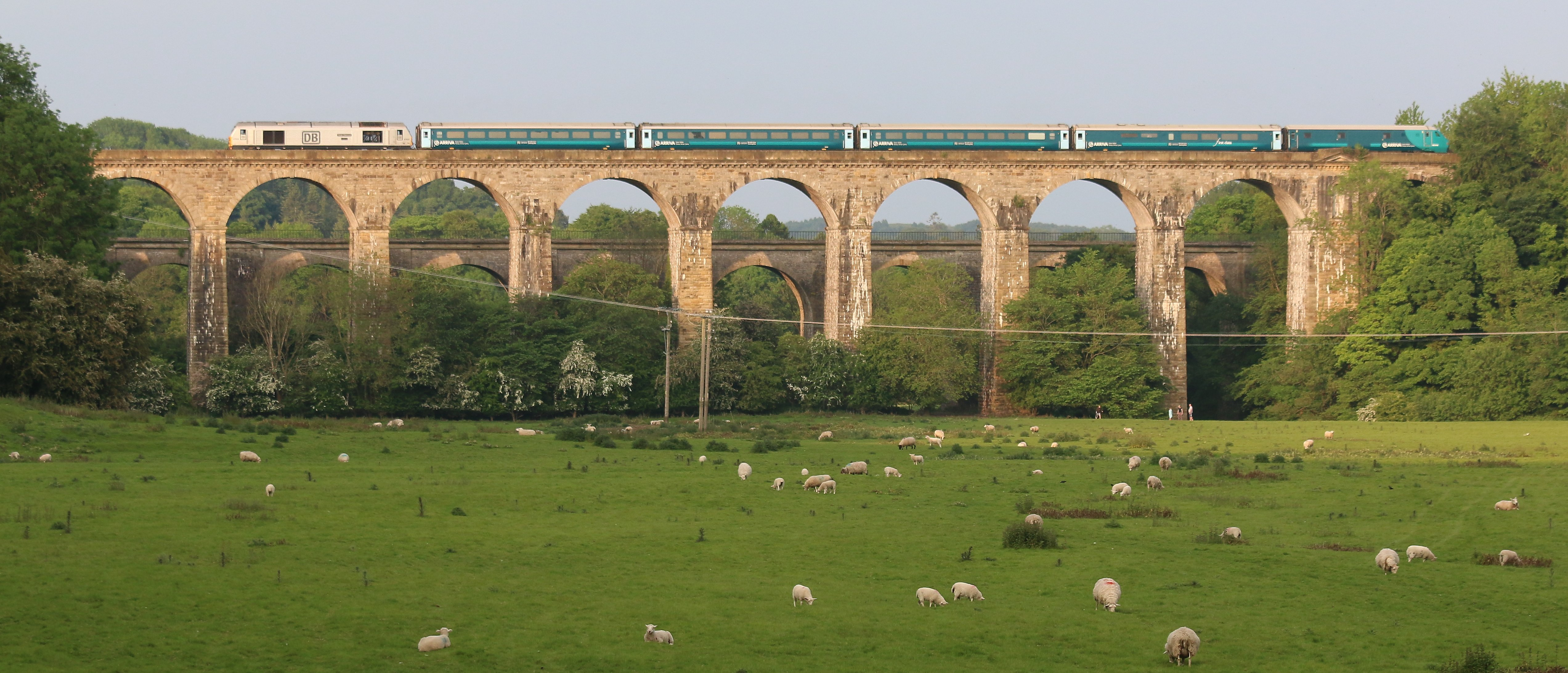
Train on the Chirk Viaduct, with the Chirk Aqueduct in the background, near Chirk, Wrexham on the Wales–England border.

=== Construction ===
The North Wales Mineral Railway, connecting Chester via Wrexham to Ruabon, had been constructed from 1844 to take advantage of mineral rights. However, realising that it offered connection opportunities between the Port of Liverpool and the industrialised Midlands, the railway applied to extend to Shrewsbury. This was refused by Parliament.

Forming an independent group of similar investors, a local act of Parliament, the Shrewsbury, Oswestry and Chester Junction Railway Act 1845 (8 & 9 Vict. c. xlii), authorising the construction of the Shrewsbury, Oswestry and Chester Junction Railway passed in 1845. Initially the proposal was to build a completely new line from a junction south east of Chester, it would cross the River Dee near Farndon completely by-passing the North Wales Mineral Railway between Wrexham and Chester. The route would then go through Overton-on-Dee across the Dee again near Chirk before reaching Oswestry and then heading to Shrewsbury. However, in July 1846, the North Wales Mineral Railway merged with the Shrewsbury, Oswestry and Chester Junction Railway to form the Shrewsbury and Chester Railway.

The formation of the new company immediately led to a revision of the plans. Construction of a new line and junction south east from Chester was abandoned. The new company would only need to build a 30 mi (48 km) line between Shrewsbury and the North Wales Mineral line at Wrexham. Likewise when construction was completed by 1848, the final route also bypassed Oswestry (one of the scheme's original destinations). Instead the town would be served by a branch line between a halt in the town and Gobowen.

On 24 May 1847, five passengers were killed and many were injured in the Dee Bridge disaster. A Chester to Ruabon train fell 11 m (36 ft) into the River Dee, following the collapse of the Dee Railway bridge on the outskirts of Chester. A girder, which had cracked in the middle, gave way as the train crossed. The engine and tender managed to reach the other side of the bridge but the carriages crashed into the river. The bridge was engineered by Robert Stephenson despite warnings from civil engineer, William Fairbairn. He had warned Stephenson about the problems using cast iron girders only a few months before construction of the bridge at a meeting at the Institution of Civil Engineers in London, but his advice was ignored. A Royal Commission following this accident led to a re-evaluation of the use of cast-iron in railway bridges. Many new bridges had to be reinforced or rebuilt.

=== Mergers and nationalisation ===
In 1849 the larger London and North Western Railway began aggressively trying to take business from the line in order to put it into bankruptcy. By 1854, the pressure forced the Shrewsbury and Chester Railway to agree to becoming part of the Great Western Railway. The route would become part of the GWR's main line from London Paddington to Birkenhead Woodside.

In 1948, following nationalisation of UK's rail system, the former GWR Shrewsbury–Chester line became part of the Western Region of British Rail. It was later transferred to BR's London Midland Region in 1963.

In the 1960s many of the passenger stations serving smaller communities along the line were closed. The track between Wrexham and Saltney Junction was also reduced from a double to a single line in 1983. There was a large reduction in freight traffic on the route as a result of the mineral industries around Wrexham closing in stages beginning with the Wrexham and Minera Railway in 1952 and then the Wrexham, Mold and Connah's Quay Railway in 1954 and the last section through Croes Newydd closed in 1982.

== Services ==
=== Passenger ===
Passenger trains along the line are mainly operated by Transport for Wales. Avanti West Coast operate one train per day on weekdays each way between Wrexham General and London Euston, via Chester.

At Chester, there are connections towards Crewe and Holyhead (on the North Wales Coast Line), towards Manchester Piccadilly via Warrington Bank Quay (on the Chester to Manchester Line), towards Manchester Piccadilly via Northwich (on the Mid-Cheshire Line) and towards Liverpool Lime Street (on Merseyrail's Wirral line).

At Wrexham, there are connections towards Liverpool Central (change at Bidston) via the Borderlands line) and London via Chester and Crewe for the West Coast Main Line. Wrexham General also acts as a terminus for many services travelling part of the line.

At Shrewsbury, connections are provided towards Carmarthen via Hereford and Cardiff Central and Manchester via Crewe (via the Welsh Marches line), towards Aberystwyth and Pwllheli (on the Cambrian Line), towards Swansea (via the Heart of Wales line) and towards Birmingham New Street.

==== Former ====
In December 2005, Arriva Trains Wales introduced a new timetable to the line, providing an hourly service between Shrewsbury and Chester, Monday to Saturday, from early morning until around midnight (involving eight additional trains serving Gobowen). This improved service includes a through train every two hours between Holyhead and Cardiff throughout most of the day.

On 28 April 2008, Wrexham & Shropshire began services along the section of line between Wrexham General and Shrewsbury, continuing via Wolverhampton to London Marylebone. The service ceased on 28 January 2011, as the operator struggled to gain enough passengers to sustain its service.

In January 2020, pre-COVID, the Office of the Rail Regulator revealed stations such as Chester, Wrexham General, Ruabon and Chirk saw their passenger numbers increase between 5.6% (Chirk) and 8% (Chester) during the 2018/2019 period.

=== Freight ===
Freight along the line is half transitory and half generated on the line. Padeswood Hall Cement works at Penyffordd does not send any of its finished product out by rail, but it does source its coal via Railfreight, mostly just once a week. Most often these trains are from Scotland and they run-round in Croes Newydd Loop south of Wrexham General station.

DB Schenker haul two trainloads of Steel Coil per day from either Llanwern or Port Talbot Steelworks to Shotton steelworks on Deeside. The return empties are twice daily too.

Kronospan's board factory at Chirk has inward flows of timber from Carlisle, Baglan Bay, Teignbridge and Ribblehead. Some of the traffic, especially from Ribblehead is seasonal and sporadic. All inbound flows must enter the works heading south and those leaving must head south too. This is because there is no cross over or run-round facility in the works sidings.

=== Community rail ===
The line is designated as a community rail partnership, as the Chester Shrewsbury Community Rail Partnership. It was awarded the status in November 2019 by the Welsh Government.

=== Wrexham to Chester service improvements ===
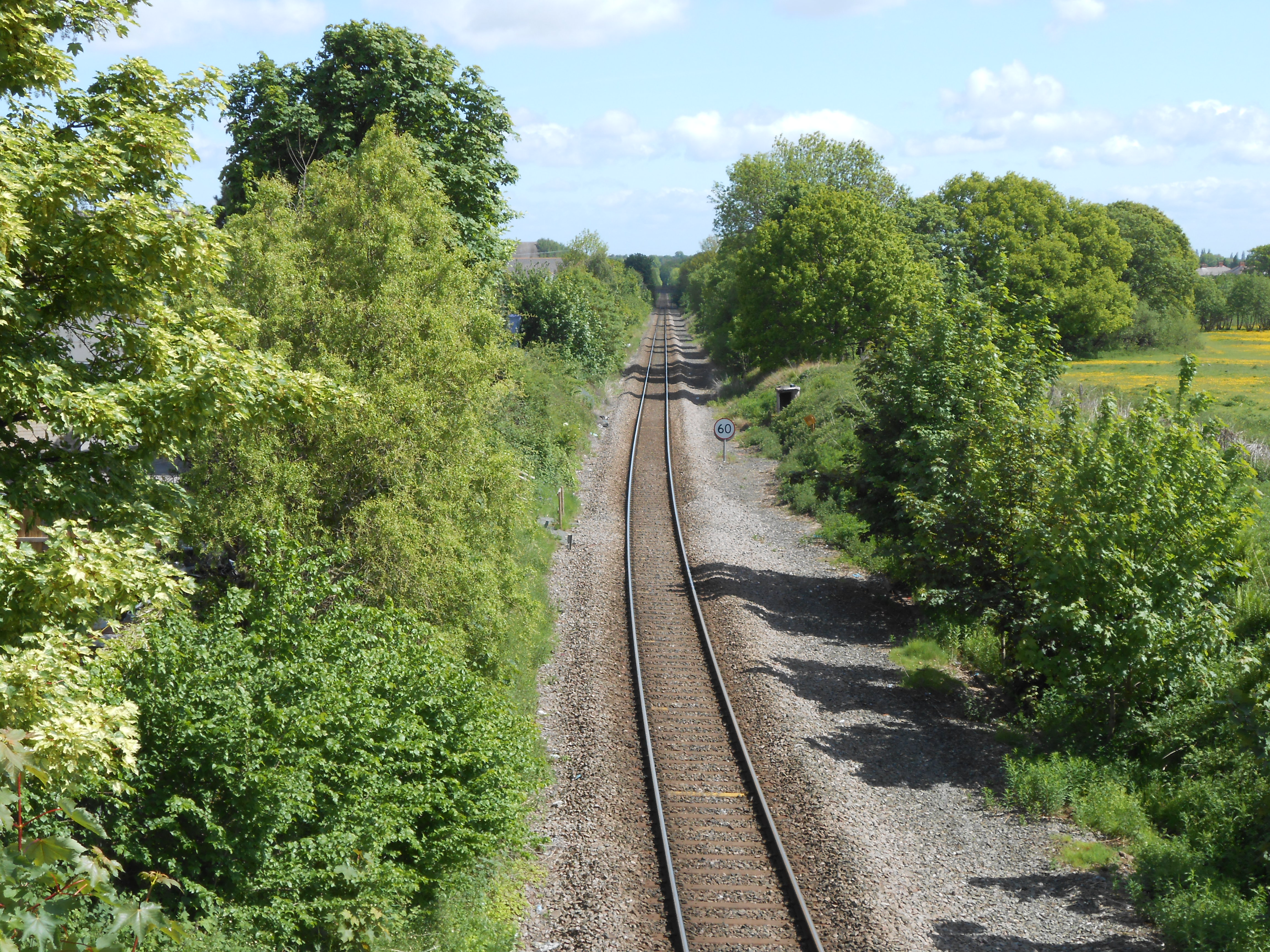
The line as a single-track near Rhosrobin, Wrexham County Borough, Wales, slightly north of Wrexham General. It remains single-track as of February 2022.

In March 2012, the National Assembly for Wales announced that sections of the line would be part of a £46-million improvement scheme. This included redoubling the track between Wrexham and Chester (Rossett Junction and Saltney Junction) and upgrading certain sections of line to allow trains to run at 90 mph. Work started on this project in June 2014 and was scheduled for completion in Spring 2015, but it was delayed until April 2017 by Network Rail due to the need for signalling cables to be replaced in addition to the track, signal and level crossing upgrades already installed. It is hoped this will create increased traffic between Wrexham and Chester and encourage new regular services to London and other new destinations.

In May 2019, two daily services between Wrexham General and Liverpool Lime Street via Chester and Runcorn were introduced by Transport for Wales, following the reinstatement of services on the Halton Curve. In December 2025 an hourly shuttle service between Wrexham General and Chester was introduced to complement longer distance trains, providing a twice hourly service between Wrexham and Chester.

== Future developments ==
The Chester to Shrewsbury Rail Partnership aims to promote travel along the line and to seek improvements to services and facilities. It is a member of the Community Rail Network. In 2006, the Chester to Shrewsbury Rail Partnership commissioned the Scott Wilson Report to assess the feasibility of certain enhancements to the service. These include the re-opening of stations at Rossett and Johnstown & Hafod and the opening of a new station at Lache.

In 2021, Transport for Wales released their Metro Development Plan published in March 2021, and their Future Developments plan for the North Wales Metro published in September 2021. The accompanying maps for the latter (as well as mentions in the former), were used to represent Transport for Wales' long-term ambitions in the area, which includes two new proposed stations on the Welsh sections of the line. A proposed station located somewhat north of Wrexham, near Gresford, termed "Wrexham North", and another station located south of Wrexham near Johnstown, termed "Wrexham South". These longer-term plans (in comparison to the 2029 plans released on the same day), do not include a proposed dates for the proposed stations, furthermore funding for the stations are the responsibility of the UK Government's Department for Transport.

In November 2021, a housing development in Baschurch set land aside for a potential railway station on site, although funding for a station has not yet been secured.

== See also ==
- Map of places on 'Shrewsbury to Chester Line' compiled from this article
