= Wrexham General railway station =

Railway station in Wrexham, Wales

Wrexham General Welsh: Wrecsam Cyffredinol
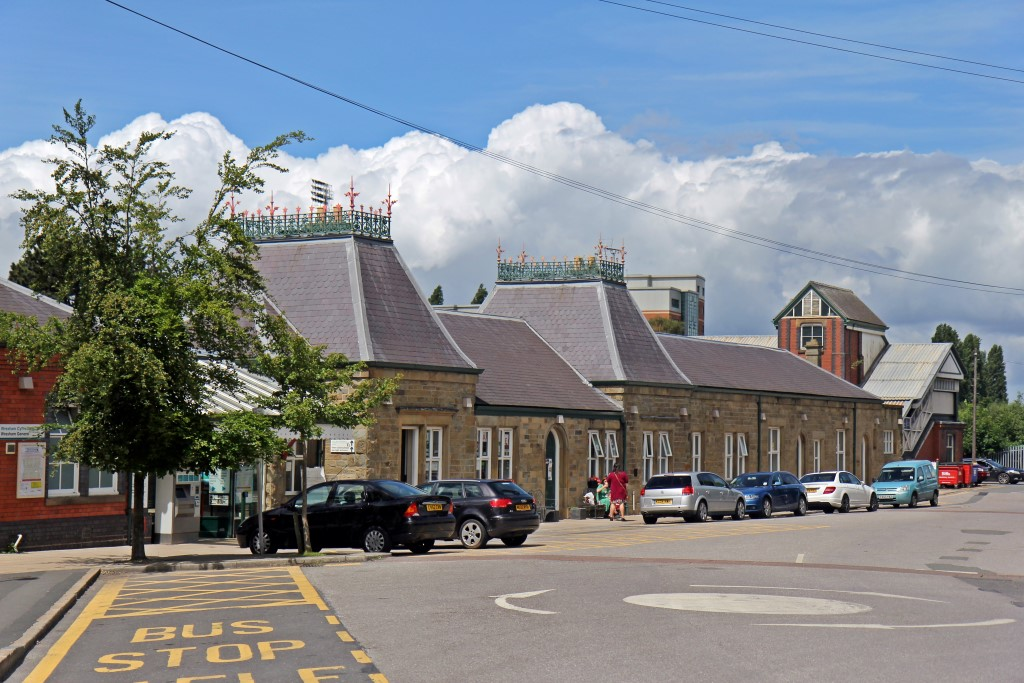
- Wrexham General railway station

General information
- Location: Wrexham, Wrexham County Borough; Wales
- Coordinates: 53°03′03″N 3°00′05″W
- Grid reference: SJ329508
- Manager: Transport for Wales
- Lines: Shrewsbury–Chester; Borderlands
- Platforms: 4

Other information
- Station code: WRX
- Classification: DfT category D

History
- Opened: 1846; Rebuilt 1912; Cafe and new platforms opened 2008; Platform 4 and footbridge rebuilt 2011

Passengers
- 2021/22: ▲0.400 million
- 2022/23: ▲0.489 million
- 2023/24: ▲0.630 million
- 2024/25: ▲0.685 million
- 2025/26: ▲0.771 million

Listed Building – Grade II
- Feature: Wrexham General Station: Entrance Building
- Designated: 5 September 1986
- Reference no.: 1855
Location
Notes
- Passenger statistics from the Office of Rail and Road

Wrexham General (Welsh: Wrecsam Cyffredinol) is the main railway station serving the city of Wrexham, north-east Wales, and one of the two serving the city, alongside Wrexham Central. It is currently operated and mostly served by Transport for Wales, with some additional services provided by Avanti West Coast to London Euston.

The station was first opened in 1846, later becoming part of the Great Western Railway (GWR) network and expanded in 1912. It is one of three railway stations in the central area of the city, one now part of General, named Wrexham Exchange, the other being Wrexham Central. It is the main hub for inter-city services in the area, and as a result 78% of all rail journeys (2006/07) in Wrexham County Borough start or end at the station. It is also a major hub for inter-city services in North Wales.

Until the early 1980s what is now platform 4 of Wrexham General, serving the Wrexham Central – Bidston service, was part of a separate station: Wrexham Exchange.

== History ==
In 1846 the first steam trains began the Railway Age in Wrexham. The line was originally called The North Wales Mineral Railway and was backed by local businessmen, among whom the developer of the steel works at Brymbo, Henry Robertson, is well known.

There have been two railway station buildings on the site. The first was the original was built by the Shrewsbury and Chester Railway in Jacobean style with Dutch gable pediments. The architect for that station was Mr Thomas Penson of Wrexham, who also designed the Shrewsbury and Gobowen stations. It was built on the edge of Wrexham, then a town which was heavily industrialised with many coal mines and steelworks to attract railway companies.

The second station building was constructed by the Great Western Railway (GWR) in 1912. The company decided the increasing rail traffic needed newer and more efficient facilities so the station was rebuilt to a standardised GWR 'French Pavilion' design, including ornate crestings on the roof "towers". The station design was unique in that it used stonework from the original building instead of standard red brick. It survived the Beeching cuts of the 1960s, as a through route for steel produced in Shotton and wood for the Chirk MDF factory.

On 24 April 1997, a wagon on an empty coal train derailed at a nearby level crossing. The train carried on for a mile into Wrexham General where the wagons scraped up the platform, damaging it and the station canopy. That prompted a massive refurbishing, including new canopies, a jetwash of the blackened sandstone buildings, and platform retiling along all main platforms. The out-of-use bay platform saw no improvements and retained its 1970s lighting until 2008, when it was refurbished by the Welsh Assembly.

The suffix "General" was used by the GWR and later the Western Region of British Railways to differentiate their main stations from others in the area, which belonged to other companies. Following the Beeching axe, Wrexham General remains the only "General" station on the National Rail network, and other "General" stations (including Shrewsbury General and Chester General, which were simply renamed "Shrewsbury" and "Chester" respectively) lost the suffix or (like Cardiff General, the last station to lose the "General" suffix) were re-dubbed as "Central" stations. Because of the continued presence of two stations serving Wrexham, the other being titled Wrexham Central, the "General" suffix was retained.

Until 1967, Wrexham General was served by GWR, latterly BR Western Region, express services between London Paddington and Birkenhead Woodside, which were withdrawn upon the electrification of the West Coast Main Line.

=== Wrexham Exchange ===
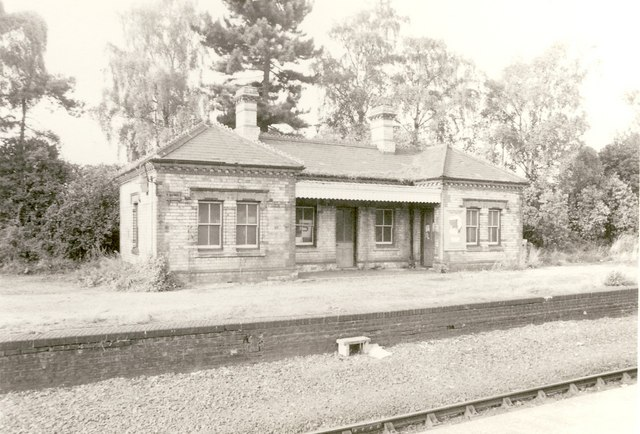
Wrexham Exchange station building

Wrexham Exchange, which is now platform 4 of Wrexham General, was originally a separate railway station opened in May 1866 for the Wrexham, Mold and Connah's Quay Railway (WMCQR). By the time that WMCQR had been bought by the Great Central Railway, the line was a through station connecting to the Cambrian Railways Wrexham Central Railway Station. The station changed hands again in 1921 during the Grouping, to the London and North Eastern Railway, as one of their few stations in Wales. Wrexham Exchange was named as such from 18 June 1951, with Wrexham General applying to all platforms from 1 June 1981. One of the two platforms was put out of use to passengers from August 1973 and was converted to a car park for Wrexham & Shropshire staff in 2008. Since the demise of that service the platform area has been out of regular use.

== Services ==
Wrexham General benefits from inter-city services towards Holyhead, Liverpool Lime Street, Birmingham International via Birmingham New Street, Cardiff Central, London Euston and a Sundays-only service to Manchester Piccadilly.

The station is also situated on the Borderlands Line, providing local services towards Deeside and Merseyside for connections to Liverpool Central.

=== Transport for Wales ===
==== Main weekday services ====
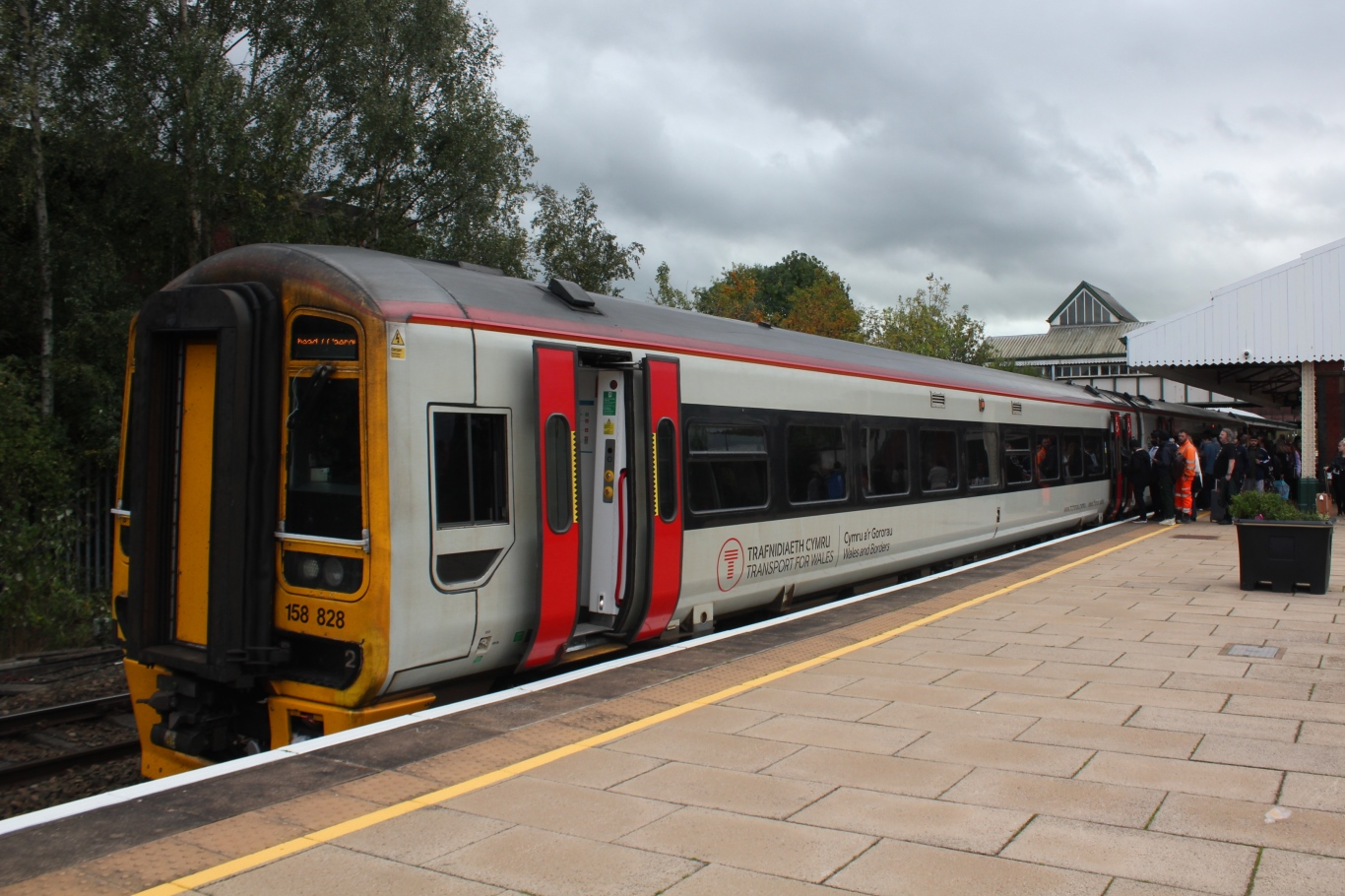
A Transport for Wales Class 158 going to Holyhead

- Borderlands Line: Wrexham Central to Bidston – mostly operated by Class 197 and Class 230 diesel multiple units.
- Cardiff-Holyhead: Cardiff Central to Holyhead, via Newport, Hereford, Shrewsbury, Chester, Llandudno Junction and Bangor with some southbound services continuing to Llanelli, via Port Talbot, Neath and Swansea – mostly operated by Class 197 diesel multiple units.
- Birmingham-Holyhead: Birmingham International to Holyhead, via Wolverhampton, Telford Central and Shrewsbury – mostly operated by Class 158 diesel multiple units.
- Wrexham General-Chester - Shuttle service which complements the longer distance Holyhead services to provide a half-hourly service to Chester.
- Premier Service: Cardiff Central to Holyhead, Newport, Shrewsbury, Chester, Llandudno Junction and Bangor (one service in each direction on weekdays) – this service commenced in early May 2011 using Class 175 DMUs and now runs as a diesel locomotive push-pull service; Class 67, Mark 4 Driving Van Trailer and Mark 4 coach sets are employed on this route.

==== Other services ====
- Birmingham-Warrington: Birmingham International to Warrington Bank Quay, via Chester and Runcorn East (one evening service on weekdays northbound only) – operated by a variety of diesel multiple units.
- Shrewsbury to Wrexham General: These services operate in early morning/late evening to allow for passengers from Shrewsbury, Gobowen, Chirk and Ruabon to access Avanti West Coast services from Wrexham to London Euston via Chester).
- Wrexham – Liverpool, via Chester and Runcorn using the Halton Curve

=== Avanti West Coast ===
- Avanti West Coast currently operate only one daily weekday service which departs at 07:00 to London Euston, calling at Chester, Crewe and Stafford. This service is operated by Class 805 Evero units. The service to Chester is attached at the rear end of the train, splitting up at Chester and vice versa.

=== Normal service pattern ===
Transport for Wales – Borderlands Line:

- 3tp2h to Bidston via Shotton (platform 4, except for the first morning train each day which uses platform 3)
- 3tp2h to Wrexham Central (platform 4)

Transport for Wales – North-South services via the Shrewsbury to Chester Line:

- 1tph to Holyhead via Chester (platform 2)
- 1tph to Shrewsbury via Ruabon, Chirk and Gobowen (platform 1), of which:
  - 1tp2h continues to Cardiff Central with some extending to Maesteg or Carmarthen
  - 1tp2h continues to Birmingham International via Birmingham New Street
- Peak services to Liverpool Lime Street via Chester and Runcorn.
- 1tpd Premier Service to Cardiff Central (platform 1)
- 1tpd Premier Service to Holyhead (platform 2)

Avanti West Coast (Mon-Fri only)

- 1tpd to London Euston/Chester (platform 2)

=== Evenings and Sundays ===
In the evenings and Sundays, there is a slightly different pattern of service; all services are operated by Transport for Wales.

- 2tp3h to Bidston
- 2tp3h to Wrexham Central
- 1tph to Shrewsbury, with 1tp2h extending to Wolverhampton and Birmingham and 2tpd to Hereford and South Wales
- 1tph to Chester with 1tp2h extending to Warrington Bank Quay or Manchester Piccadilly and a small number to Holyhead

Preceding station	National Rail	Following station
Terminus	Avanti West Coast; Wrexham General to London Euston	Chester
Terminus	Transport for Wales; Wrexham General to Crewe	Chester
Ruabon	Transport for Wales; Cardiff Central – Holyhead	Chester
Ruabon	Transport for Wales; Birmingham – Holyhead (via Chester)	Chester
Wrexham Central	Transport for Wales; Borderlands line	Gwersyllt
	Historical railways	
Rhos	Great Western Railway; Shrewsbury to Chester Line	Rhosrobin Halt
Plas Power (WMR); Line and station closed	Great Western Railway; Wrexham and Minera Railway	Terminus
Gatewen Halt; Line and station closed	Great Western Railway; Wrexham and Minera Railway	Terminus

=== Facilities and further passenger information ===
- Self service ticket machines are available
- Ticket hall with counters for ticket purchase and information points is available
- All platforms have monitors showing the next three trains to depart or terminate are in use
- All platforms have announcements
- There is a taxi rank at this station
- Regular buses call at this station
- There is a large pay and display car park at this station
- There are three entrances/exits to the station, one via the main ticket hall. Another on platform one near the overpass. The third is located on Mold road connecting to platform 4
- Disabled access to whole station
- Lifts to all platforms via main over pass
- All regular north and south bound long-distance trains have at seat or buffet car catering
- Waiting rooms are located on the island platforms
- This station is covered by a roof
- Regular BTP security checks are carried out throughout this station

== Layout ==
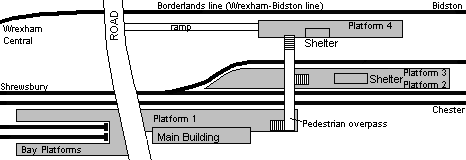
A layout map of Wrexham General

Wrexham General comprises four operational platforms with two disused bay platforms at the southern end of Platform 1. These were used for trains to Barmouth via the Ruabon Barmouth line until the 1960s. Platforms 1 and 2 are on the main Chester to Shrewsbury line, platform 3 being on an island platform opposite 2; and platform 4, until the mid-1980s a separate former Great Central Railway station named Wrexham Exchange, was on the ex-Ellesmere to Bidston line, now the Wrexham to Bidston Borderlands Line. Platform 5, once opposite and on the same route as platform 4, became disused when the line was singled, however in 2008 it has been re-surfaced and is now a private parking space.

- Platform 1 can accommodate a 10 car train, and is used for long distance southbound intercity passenger services to Shrewsbury, and onwards to Birmingham International (via Telford Central) or Cardiff Central, operated by Transport for Wales, and for services terminating at Wrexham from Chester and London Euston. Due to signalling constraints, trains cannot depart to the north.
- Platform 2 can accommodate a 10 car train, and is used for regular northbound passenger inter city and regional services to Chester and services onwards to the North Wales Coast line to Holyhead and for services to Manchester Piccadilly via Chester and Runcorn, operated by Transport for Wales. Inter city Services to London Euston (via Chester and Crewe) are also provided on this platform by Avanti West Coast. Due to signalling constraints, trains cannot depart to the south.
- Platform 3 can accommodate a 7 car train, and was used for regular passenger services to London Marylebone via Shrewsbury, Telford Central and Tame Bridge, operated by Wrexham & Shropshire. This platform is now used by a small number of Borderlands Line passenger services (usually the first northbound and last southbound train each day), for services terminating at Wrexham from Shrewsbury and for freight services changing between the Shrewsbury-Chester line and the Borderlands line. This platform is signalled bidirectionally, so trains can depart either south towards Shrewsbury or north towards Bidston, although no services from Shrewsbury currently depart on the Borderlands line and vice versa. In practice this platform is used for trains terminating from either direction.
- Platform 4 is located outside the main station canopy and is used for regular branch line passenger services northbound to Bidston, and to Wrexham Central in the opposite direction, operated by Transport for Wales. This platform is signalled bidirectionally, so trains can depart either south towards Wrexham Central or north towards Bidston.

== Recent developments ==
The station is currently undergoing a renaissance as a number of new services have been introduced. Since 2005 the station has been a stop of the two hourly Cardiff to Holyhead Transport for Wales service (introduced by previous franchise operator Arriva Trains Wales, which occasionally extends to Llanelli. The two hourly Birmingham service has also been extended to Birmingham International and Holyhead.

In April 2008, Ieuan Wyn Jones AM, the Deputy First Minister for Wales opened a new Wrexham Network Rail depot. It consisted of the refurbishment of two terminal bay platforms to the south of the station for overnight stabling of trains and the construction of a crew depot. The development was opened to coincide with the start of services from Wrexham General to London by Wrexham & Shropshire, who utilised the depot until services to London Marylebone stopped in January 2011.

From February 2009 a cafe has opened on the station in formerly empty office space. In June 2011, construction began on the increased access for disabled people to platform four. The existing footbridge between platforms three and four was removed in preparation for the construction of a new footbridge which includes a lift on Platform four. This obviates the use of the road bridge for disabled access to platform four. The new bridge has been built to modern standards but in a style sympathising with the rest of the station design. The footbridge was installed in a record 12 hours and a timelapse video was shot of the event.

On 20 March 2012 it was announced that sections of the North to South Wales line would be upgraded along the Wrexham section of the line to a total of £46 million worth of improvements. These include redoubling the Wrexham – Chester section, and upgrading sections of the line to allow for 90 mph running throughout. This will allow for an increase in traffic between Wrexham and Chester, including further London services and a possibility of regular services to new destinations. One report has suggested extending the hourly First TransPennine Express Hull – Manchester Piccadilly service to Wrexham via Chester, which would provide a direct service to Manchester, Leeds and Hull. Other suggestions include extending the current hourly Chester – Crewe shuttle service south to Wrexham and north to Manchester (via Manchester Airport). Although the engineering work completed in April 2017, no new developments are anticipated until late 2017 at the earliest.

Transport for Wales have confirmed plans to introduce peak time services to and from Liverpool Lime Street via Chester and Runcorn, along the Halton Curve, from May 2019.

== Gallery ==
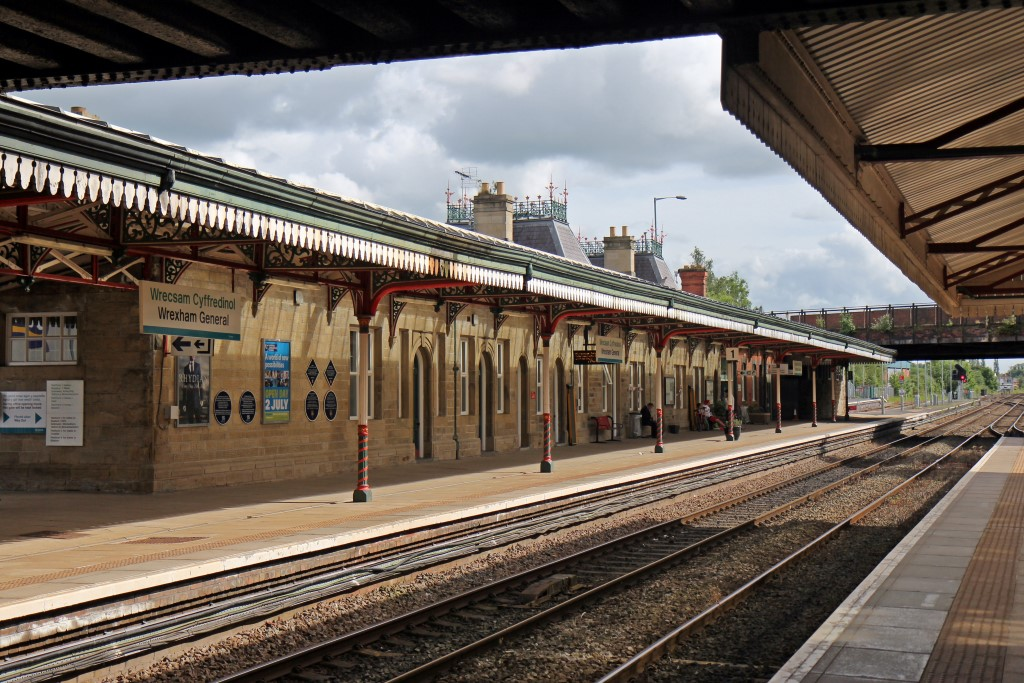
Platform 1

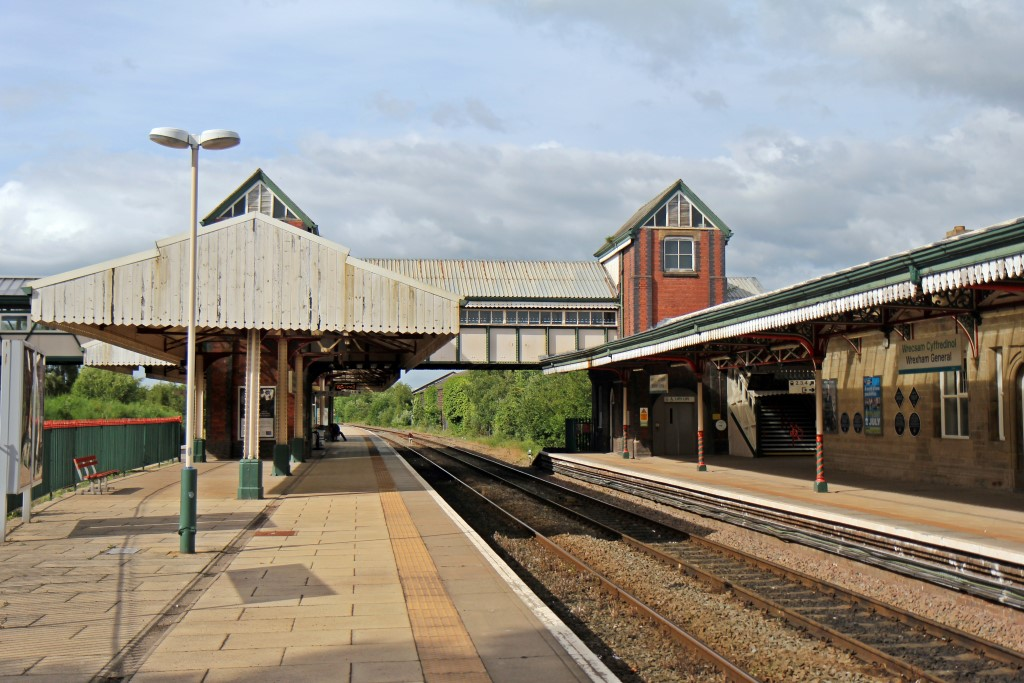
The footbridge, viewed from platform 2

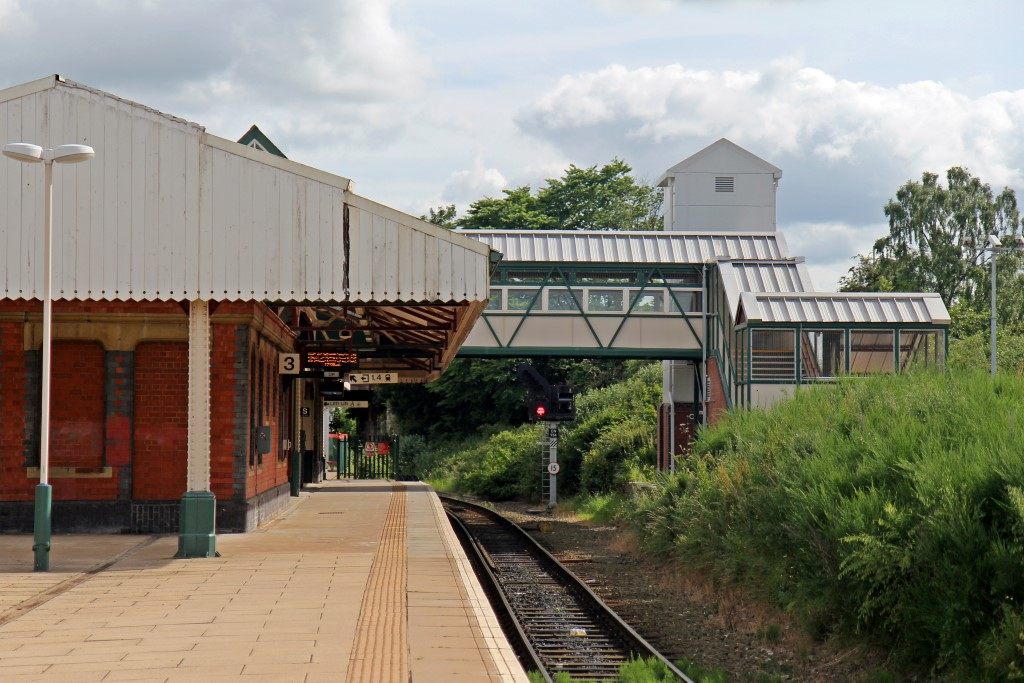
Platform 3

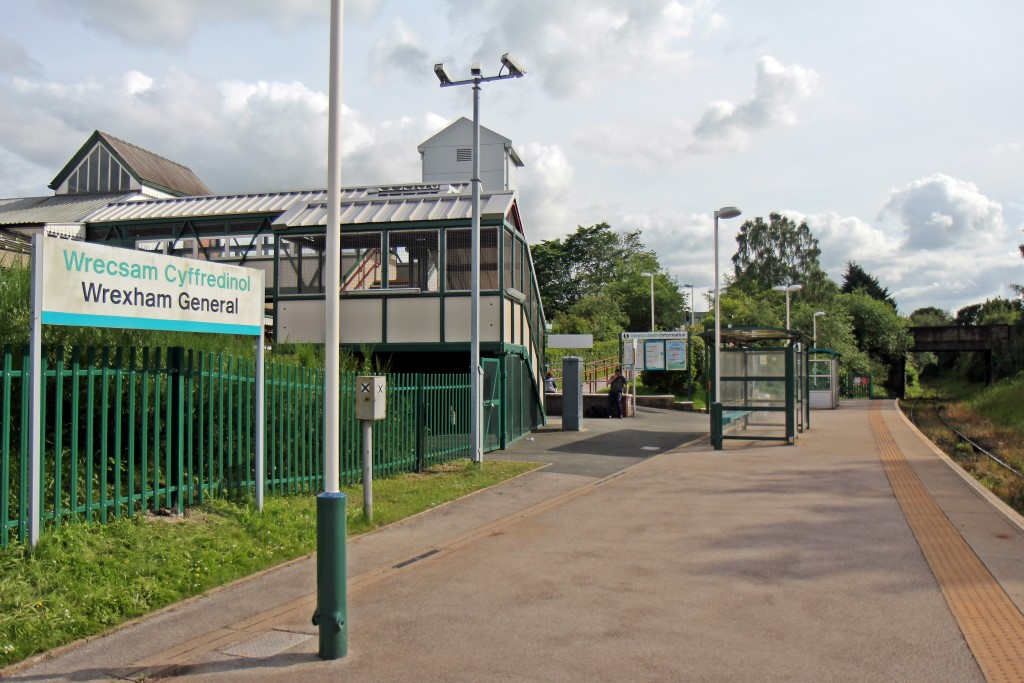
Platform 4 serves the Borderlands Line

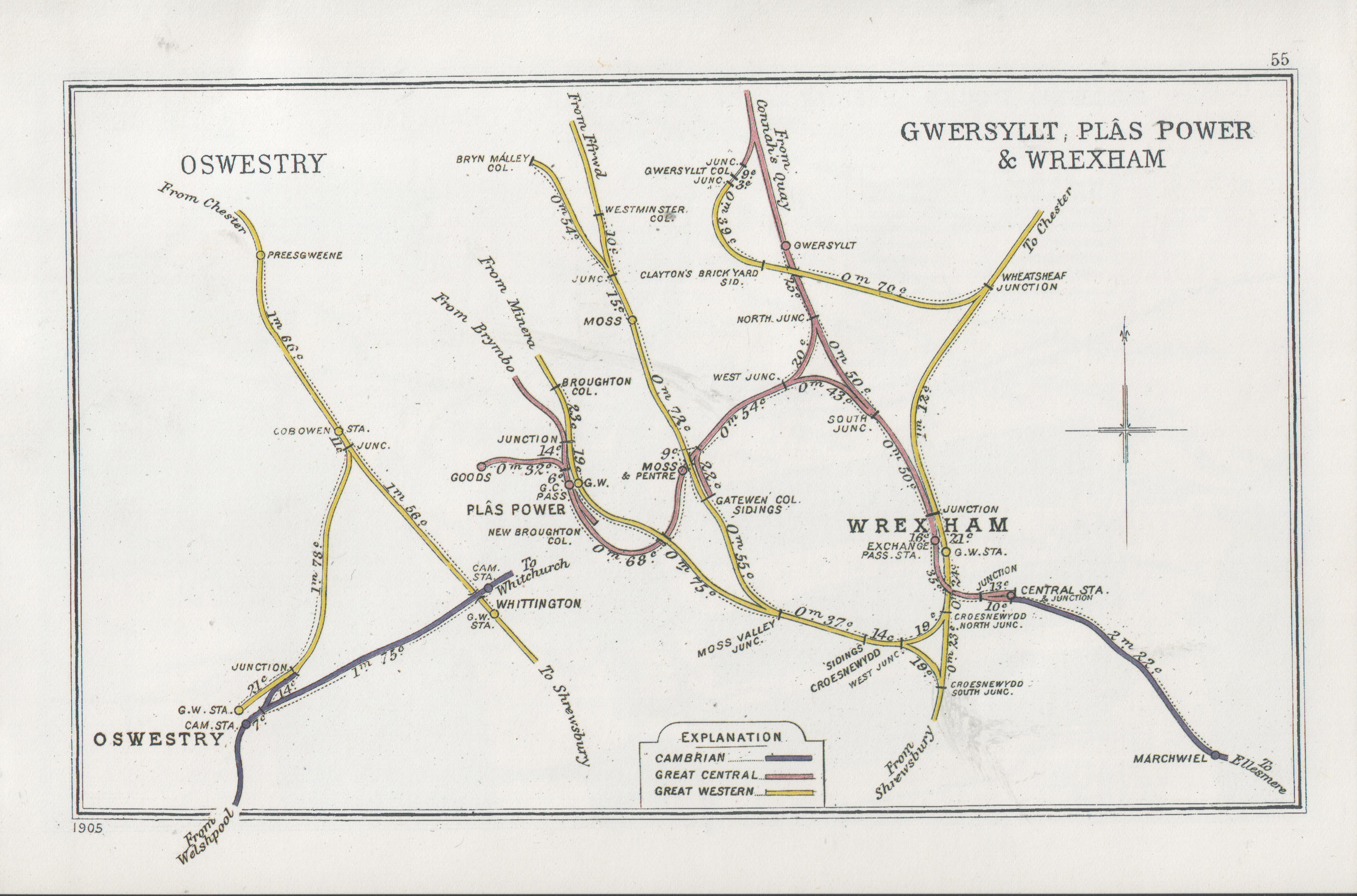
Oswestry, Gwersyllt, Plas Power & Wrexham on the Railway Clearing House map.
