= Rhos =

Rhos (rarely Rhôs) may refer to these places in Wales:

== Settlements ==
- Rhos, Neath Port Talbot, South Wales Valleys
- Rhos-on-Sea (Welsh: Llandrillo-yn-Rhos), Colwyn Bay, Conwy County Borough
- Rhosllanerchrugog, Wrexham County Borough

== Defunct places ==
- Rhos (north Wales), a sub-Roman kingdom and medieval cantref in mid-north Wales
- Rhos (south Wales) (later Roose Hundred), an early medieval cantref in Pembrokshire
- Rhos railway station (1848–1855), Rhosllanerchrugog
- Rhos (GWR) railway station (1901–1963), Rhosllanerchrugog

== See also ==
- Rhoose, a village in the Vale of Glamorgan, Wales
- Roose, a suburb of Barrow-in-Furness, Cumbria, England
- Rose (disambiguation)
