= Wynn Hall =

House in Penycae, Wales

Coordinates: 52.9959°N 3.0590°W

Wynn Hall is a 17th-century house in the old hamlet of Bodylltyn in Ruabon, Wrexham, Wales standing at the junction of the Penycae Road and Plas Bennion Road. It was built in about 1649 by William Wynn and is a Grade II* listed building.

During the English Civil War William Wynn served on the Parliamentarian side and was imprisoned at Denbigh Castle. Wynn was one of the commissioners named in the 1650 Act for Propagating the Gospel in Wales. During the 17th and 18th centuries the family was connected with the development of the nonconformist cause in the Wrexham area. He died in 1692 and was buried in the Dissenters' Graveyard in Rhosddu, Wrexham.

William Wynn's granddaughter Sarah, the daughter of Archibald Hamilton and Sarah Wynn, married the Rev. John Kenrick (1683–1745), minister of Chester Street Presbyterian Chapel, Wrexham which placed the house in the hands of the Kenrick family for over two centuries.

The Wynn Hall Colliery was opened by William Kenrick (1798–1865), the grandson of John, and consisted of two pits, the 'Foundry Pit' and the 'Rock Pit'. Both pits were "drowned out" in 1846, severely affecting coal production. The Kenricks also owned a spelter (zinc) works at nearby Copperas.

William's cousin, Archibald Kenrick, was grandfather of cousins Harriet and Florence Kenrick, the first and second wives of the politician Joseph Chamberlain, mothers of Sir Austen Chamberlain and the British prime minister Neville Chamberlain respectively . Florence Kenrick's sister Louisa was the wife of Joseph Chamblerlain's brother Arthur; they were grandparents of the author Elizabeth Longford and great-grandparents of the Labour politician Harriet Harman.

Llewelyn Kenrick (1847–1933), the son of William Kenrick, was born at Wynn Hall. After attending Ruabon Grammar School he trained as a solicitor but always remained a keen football player. Kenrick was instrumental in forming the Football Association of Wales in 1876 at a meeting in the Wynnstay Arms Hotel in Ruabon. Kenrick captained the Welsh national side for their first game in 1876 in Glasgow, Scotland. He was later appointed coroner for East Denbighshire.

This connection between the Kenricks and Wynn Hall ended in 1970 when the remaining members of the family sold the estate and emigrated to Australia.

For a short period of time Wynn Hall had its own halt on the Pontcysyllte Branch (formerly the Ruabon Brook Tramway) which ran between Rhosllannerchrugog and the canal wharf at Pontcysyllte. Although this was primarily an industrial line, a rail motor service ran between Wrexham and Wynn Hall Halt (via Rhos) from 1905 to 1915; but following the closure of Wynn Hall Colliery the number of passengers fell, and from 1915 the passenger service was terminated at Rhos, though the line through Wynn Hall remained open for goods traffic until 1953. The track was lifted in the late 1950s and is now largely obliterated.

== Sources ==
- KENRICK family of Wynn Hall, Denbs; Dictionary of Welsh Biography
