= Acrefair railway station =

Disused railway station in Acrefair, Wrexham

Acrefair
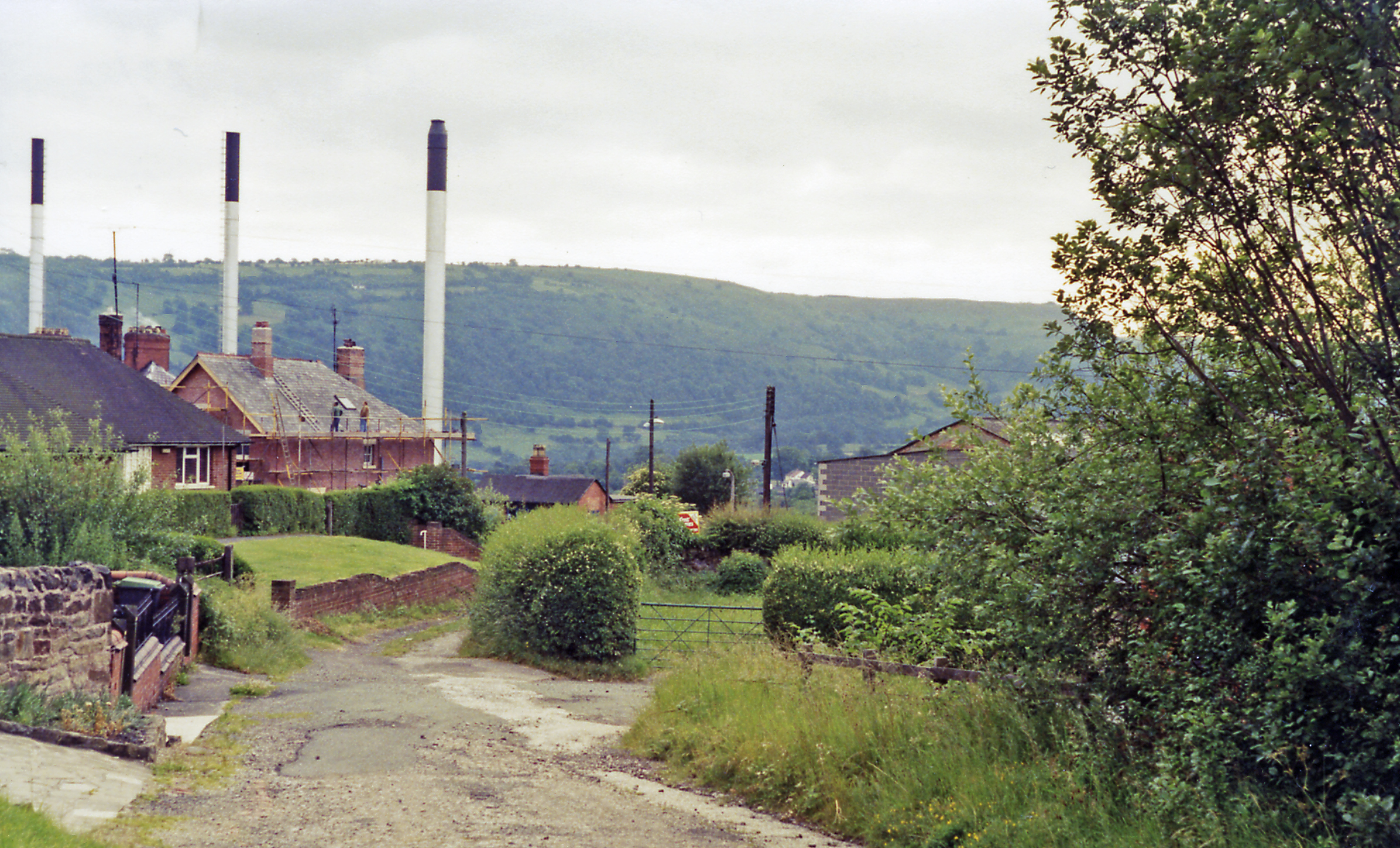
- Location of the former station (1992)

General information
- Location: Acrefair, Wrexham; Wales
- Coordinates: 52.9795°N 3.0741°W
- Grid reference: SJ27984300
- Platforms: 2

Other information
- Status: Disused

History
- Original company: Vale of Llangollen Railway
- Pre-grouping: Great Western Railway
- Post-grouping: Great Western Railway

Key dates
- 2 June 1862: Opened
- 2 November 1964: Closed to goods
- 18 January 1965: Closed to passengers
Location

Acrefair railway station (Welsh pronunciation: [ˌakrɛˈvɑɪr] ak-REH-vire) was a former station on the Ruabon–Barmouth line in North East Wales. It closed to passengers on 18 January 1965 as part of the Beeching Axe.

== History ==
Although built by the Vale of Llangollen Railway, its services were operated by the Great Western Railway from the outset. The line then passed on to the Western Region of British Railways on nationalisation in 1948, and was closed by the British Railways Board.

The station was built at a high-level above King Street, close to its junction with Llangollen Road. The line was double track between Ruabon and Llangollen and there was a signal box at Acrefair. The Ruabon Brook Tramway, a goods line from the local coalfields and clay works to Froncysyllte, passed immediately below the station, crossing King Street at street level via a gated crossing.

According to the Official Handbook of Stations the classes of traffic being handled at this station in 1956 were G & P and there was a 3-ton crane.

== The site today ==
The course of the line here is now an access road though a small industrial estate.

Preceding station	Disused railways	Following station
Ruabon	Great Western Railway; Ruabon Barmouth Line	Trevor

== Sources ==
- Butt, R. V. J. (October 1995). The Directory of Railway Stations: details every public and private passenger station, halt, platform and stopping place, past and present (1st ed.). Sparkford: Patrick Stephens Ltd. ISBN 978-1-85260-508-7. OCLC 60251199. OL 11956311M.
- Jowett, Alan (2000). Jowett's Nationalised Railway Atlas (1st ed.). Penryn, Cornwall: Atlantic Transport Publishers. ISBN 978-0-906899-99-1. OCLC 228266687.
- Jowett, Alan (March 1989). Jowett's Railway Atlas of Great Britain and Ireland: From Pre-Grouping to the Present Day (1st ed.). Sparkford: Patrick Stephens Ltd. ISBN 978-1-85260-086-0. OCLC 22311137.
