= Wynn Hall Halt railway station =

Short-lived railway station in Wrexham, Wales

Wynn Hall

General information
- Location: Bodylltyn, Denbighshire; Wales
- Coordinates: 52.9967°N 3.0578°W
- Grid reference: SJ291449
- Platforms: 1

Other information
- Status: Disused

History
- Original company: Great Western Railway
- Pre-grouping: Great Western Railway

Key dates
- 1 May 1905: Opened
- 22 March 1915: Closed
Location

Wynn Hall Halt railway station co-served the hamlet of Bodylltyn, Denbighshire (now Wrexham), Wales, from 1905 to 1915 on the Pontcysyllte branch.

== History ==
The station was opened on 1 May 1905 by the Great Western Railway. It was situated on the north side of the B5057. Nearby was Wynn Hall Colliery and a signal box which opened with the station. The colliery and spelter works adjacent had been the Northern end of the Ruabon Brook Tramway - an early horse operated tramway taking goods down to the canal. The London and North Western Railway converted the tramway to a railway in the 1860s and in 1867 extended it northwards to the brickworks at Llwynenion just North of Rhosllannerchrugog. The halt was located where this new track diverged from the original tramway, although it wasn't built until after the GWR had built their connection into Rhosllannerchrugog (in 1901) and bought the Pontcysyllte Branch from the LNWR. When the colliery closed in 1909, passenger traffic was severely reduced. This was exacerbated with the success of the new bus service, thus the station closed on 22 March 1915.

The use of a halt as a terminus for a passenger service sounds unusual, but the same approach was adopted for the nearby Minera Branch and the Legacy Branch, and in each case the line continued further for goods traffic only.

| Preceding station | Disused railways | Following station |
|---|---|---|
| Terminus | Great Western Railway; Pontcysyllte branch | Pant Halt; Line and station closed |
