= Brook Street Halt railway station =

Former railway station in Wrexham, Wales

Brook Street Halt

General information
- Location: Llangollen, Denbighshire, Wales; Wales
- Coordinates: 53.0093°N 3.0611°W
- Grid reference: SJ289463
- Platforms: 1

Other information
- Status: Disused

History
- Original company: Great Western Railway
- Pre-grouping: Great Western Railway

Key dates
- 1901: opened for goods
- 1 May 1905: Opened for passengers
- 22 March 1915: Closed
Location

Brook Street Halt railway station served the town of Rhosllanerchrugog, Denbighshire (now Wrexham), Wales, from 1905 to 1915 on the Pontcysyllte branch.

== History ==
Brook Street had been the goods station for Rhosllanerchrugog since the Great Western Railway opened the Rhos Branch in 1901. Here there were a goods office, a goods shed, a weighing machine, a 1-ton lifting crane and two sidings. As a result of the introduction of railmotor services the Brook Street passenger halt was opened on the North side (opposite the goods shed) on 1 May 1905. On the south side of the level crossing was the ground level, timber-built signal box. Passenger trains ran as far South as Wynn Hall Halt, but with the closure of the Wynn Hall colliery passenger traffic reduced and when the bus services were introduced in 1912, the railmotor service to Wynn Hall became uneconomic and as a result passenger services south of Rhos station were withdrawn and the Brook Street Halt was closed on 22 March 1915. The signal box closed in 1927. The Pontcysyllte branch south of Rhos, remained open for goods traffic, and the goods office remained open until the line was closed.

| Preceding station | Disused railways | Following station |
|---|---|---|
| Pant Halt; Line and station closed | Great Western Railway; Pontcysyllte branch | Rhos (GWR); Line and station closed |
