= Legacy railway station =

Disused railway station in Rhostyllen, Wales

Legacy

General information
- Location: Rhostyllen, Denbighshire; Wales
- Coordinates: 53.0273°N 3.0541°W
- Grid reference: SJ294483
- Platforms: 1

Other information
- Status: Disused

History
- Original company: Great Western Railway
- Post-grouping: Great Western Railway

Key dates
- 1 October 1901: Opened
- 1 January 1931: Closed to passengers
- 14 October 1963: Closed to goods
Location

Legacy railway station was built close to the location of the disused Legacy Colliery when the Great Western Railway built the Rhos Branch in 1901. The disused line built to serve the colliery in 1876 was used by the Rhos branch for a short distance through Legacy Station to the newly formed Legacy junction where the Rhos branch diverged to follow a more Northerly route, eventually meeting the Pontcysyllte branch. Legacy Station was open from 1901 to 1931 for passenger traffic and until 1963 for goods traffic.

== History ==
The name of the station comes from the short-lived Legacy Colliery which was built around 1873. The railway through Ponkey was extended north to serve the colliery around 1876 (marked on ordnance survey maps as the Legacy Colliery Branch), but work at the colliery was suspended in 1876, and was never resumed. When the railway was built to Rhosllanerchrugog in 1901, it linked up with the unused Legacy Colliery Branch. Legacy Station was built just East of the junction and named after the long-closed colliery, the GWR renamed the Legacy Colliery Branch as the Legacy Branch.

Legacy station was opened on 1 October 1901 by the Great Western Railway. It was situated to the north of Bronwylfa Road. It initially had a ground level signal box but it was later replaced in 1905 with a new one to the west. It was in 1905 that railmotor services were introduced, which extended the passenger services on the Rhos branch as far as Wynn Hall Halt, and introduced services over the Legacy branch as far as Ponkey Crossing Halt. When passenger services to Ponkey Crossing Halt closed in 1915, the line between Legacy Junction and Aberderfyn Halt was closed. The track was lifted in 1917, except for a short spur at Legacy Junction. The station closed to passengers on 1 January 1931 but it remained open to goods, as did the goods siding. The goods siding saw additional traffic in 1934 with the building of the water tower and service depot of the Wrexham and East Denbighshire Water Company, which remains to this day. The signal box closed in 1952. The station closed to goods on 14 October 1963. The track was lifted in the summer of 1964.

Preceding station	Disused railways	Following station
Rhos (GWR); Line and station closed	Great Western Railway; Rhos branch	Rhostyllen; Line and station closed
Fennant Road Halt; Line and station closed	Great Western Railway; Legacy branch	Rhostyllen; Line and station closed
