= Plas Madoc =

Housing estate in Wrexham County Borough, Wales

Coordinates: 52.98405°N 3.06449°W

- Housing estate
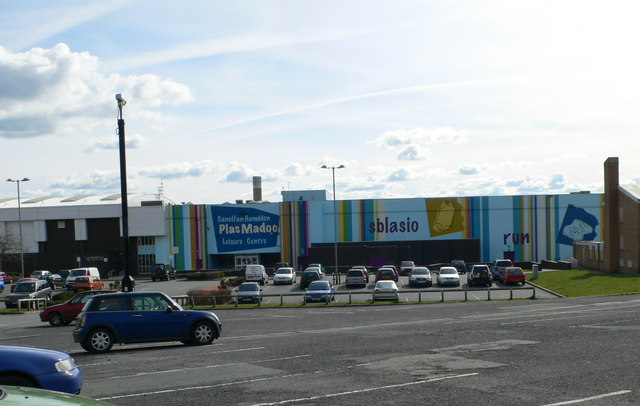
- Leisure centre in Plas Madoc

- Location within Wrexham
- Population: Approx. 1,800 (2010 survey)
- OS grid reference: SJ2854343532
- Community: Cefn
- Principal area: Wrexham
- Preserved county: Clwyd
- Country: Wales
- Sovereign state: United Kingdom
- Post town: WREXHAM
- Postcode district: LL14
- Dialling code: 01978
- Police: North Wales
- Fire: North Wales
- Ambulance: Welsh
- UK Parliament: Montgomeryshire and Glyndŵr
- Senedd Cymru – Welsh Parliament: Clwyd South

Plas Madoc is a housing estate and former electoral ward near Acrefair, in the Cefn community in Wrexham County Borough, Wales. It is located seven miles to the south-west of Wrexham, and contains The Land adventure playground, and a community-run leisure centre with a swimming pool. The area is one of the most deprived areas (top 10% most deprived) in Wales, and the fourth most deprived LSOA in Wrexham County Borough.

Plas Madoc F.C. was a football club in the area, the club dissolved in 2020.

== History ==
The land that the housing estate now stands on was once part of the Chirk Estate. Between 1677 and 1678, there was an ironworks including a charcoal-fired blast furnace situated on the site, although the precise location of the blast furnace has not been determined. The furnace had an annual output of 300 short tons (270 tonnes) in 1711, and between 1757 and 1761 (or potentially earlier), there could have been a site for Coke smelting.

The site was developed by the Lloyd family of Plas Madoc, with their descendants later establishing the Acrefair or New Ruabon Iron Works on the estate in around 1817. By the early 19th century, there was a coal mining operation of the "Plas Madoc Colliery" in the area, established by the Lloyd family and their successors the Rowlands family, with a pit recorded to be present in the area by the early 19th century.

The area was connected to the Trevor Basin by the Ruabon Brook Railway (by the railway's "Plasmadoc branch") in 1808, with the railway later extended to Pen-y-cae and Rhosllanerchrugog by 1821, and continued operating until the 1860s. When the ironworks ceased production by 1822, it contained two blast furnaces, 18 puddling furnaces, a large double casting house and a steam engine used to power the blast furnaces. There are no surface traces of the former industrial activities.

Throughout the 19th century, other railways were established near the area, with the local Acrefair Ironworks railways lines, the Shrewsbury and Chester Railway establishing a line in 1848-54 and the Vale of Llangollen Railway established to the south of the present-day estate connecting with the Shrewsbury and Chester and onwards to Llangollen and Corwen. The Shrewsbury–Chester line still operates to the east of the area, with Ruabon being the nearest operating station.

Prior to 1914, there were no major residential areas present in the area. In the 1950s, a housing estate was set up in the area, replacing the former industrial sites. In 1968–70, the housing estate was expanded to designs by Mervyn Edwards, Morton and Partners of Oswestry, including a leisure centre: the first stage between 1972 and 1974 built the centre's sports hall, and the swimming pool was completed in 1977. It opened as a council-run centre, and is now known as the "Plas Madoc Leisure Centre". The centre was closed and earmarked for demolition by Wrexham Council on 27 April 2014 citing the cost to maintain and modernise its facilities, but was re-opened under community management on 6 December 2014. In December 2016, the centre was again on the edge of closing due to financial hardship.

In 2017, major improvement works begun on the housing estate, as part of a Wrexham Council project for the area to meet the Welsh Government's Welsh Housing Quality Standard. The project includes the fitting of cavity wall insulation, and roofs replaced on the properties that require it. Twenty-two empty properties in the Peris and Gwynant areas of the estate would be demolished as part of the project.

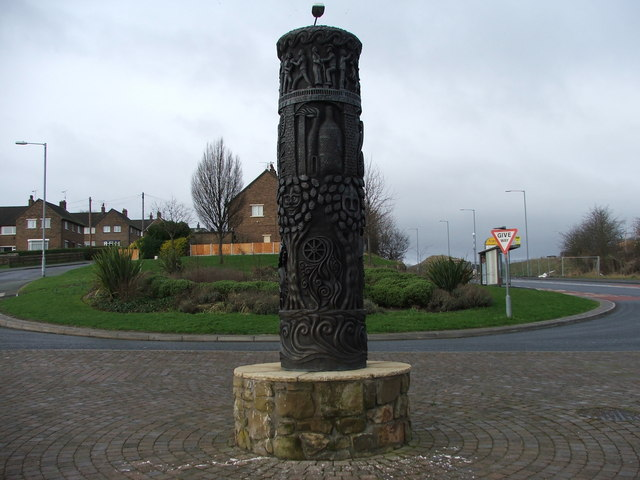
Madoc's column, near the entrance to the housing estate.

In the list of standardised Welsh place-names in Wrexham County Borough, the place is recommended to be renamed to Plas Madog (Welsh pronunciation) by the Welsh Language Commissioner in both English and Welsh. However, "Plas Madoc" is the pre-dominant name in English and may still be used in Welsh.
