= Wynnville Halt railway station =

Former railway station in Wrexham, Wales

Wynnville Halt

General information
- Location: Ruabon, Wrexham; Wales
- Coordinates: 52.9932°N 3.0381°W
- Grid reference: SJ303445
- Platforms: 2

Other information
- Status: Disused

History
- Original company: Great Western Railway

Key dates
- 1 Feb 1934: Station opens
- 12 Sep 1960: Closed
Location

Wynnville Halt was a small railway halt located on the Shrewsbury to Chester Line less than a mile north of Ruabon station in Wales. It was opened by the Great Western Railway in 1934, to serve the newly built Wynnville housing estate, as part of its programme of opening halts to combat emerging competition from bus services.

== Neighbouring stations ==
Preceding station	Historical railways	Following station
Ruabon	Great Western Railway; Shrewsbury to Chester Line	Johnstown and Hafod
