= Rhostyllen railway station =

Former railway station in Wrexham, Wales

Coordinates: 53.0336°N 3.0266°W

Rhostyllen

General information
- Location: Rhostyllen & Bersham, Wrexham; Wales
- Platforms: 1

Other information
- Status: Disused

History
- Original company: Great Western Railway

Key dates
- 1 October 1901: Opened
- 1 Jan 1931: Closed to passengers
- 14 Oct 1963: Closed to goods
Location

Rhostyllen (pronounced [r̥ɔsˈtəɬən], Ross-tuth-l'n) was a minor railway station of the Great Western Railway, located on the Rhos Branch just off the Shrewsbury to Chester Line a couple of miles south of Wrexham in Wales. Rhostyllen was a mining area and the rail-served Bersham Colliery was just to the south.

According to the Official Handbook of Stations the following classes of traffic were being handled at this station in 1956: G & P† and there was no crane. It is curious that parcels and miscellaneous traffic was still being handled here at that date, twenty five years after the station had closed to passengers.

== Neighbouring stations ==
Preceding station	Disused railways	Following station
Legacy	Great Western Railway; Rhos Branch	Wrexham General
