= Pant Halt railway station =

Short-lived railway station in Wrexham, Wales

Pant Halt

General information
- Location: Pant-pastynog, Denbighshire; Wales
- Coordinates: 53.0021°N 3.0594°W
- Grid reference: SJ290455
- Platforms: 1

Other information
- Status: Disused

History
- Original company: Great Western Railway
- Pre-grouping: Great Western Railway

Key dates
- 1 May 1905: Opened
- 22 March 1915: Closed
Location

Pant Halt railway station served the hamlet of Pant-pastynog, Denbighshire (now Wrexham), Wales, from 1905 to 1915 on the Pontcysyllte branch.

== History ==
The station was opened on 1 May 1905 by the Great Western Railway when they introduced railmotor services from Wrexham General station as far as Wynn Hall Halt. It was situated on the south side of the B5097. It had no station buildings or any other facilities but nearby was The Pant Brickworks, which was served by rail. The station closed on 22 March 1915 after losing to the competition of the newly introduced bus services. The Pontcysyllte branch remained in use for goods traffic until 1953, and after that the line to the south of Pant was closed and lifted, but the section of the line from Pant northwards remained open to serve the brick works. The station's final use was a rail tour on 18 April 1959. The section of the line finally closed on 14 October 1963, and the line was lifted in 1964.

Preceding station	Disused railways	Following station
Wynn Hall Halt; Line and station closed	Great Western Railway; Pontcysyllte branch	Brook Street Halt; Line and station closed
