= Gareth Valentine =

Welsh musician

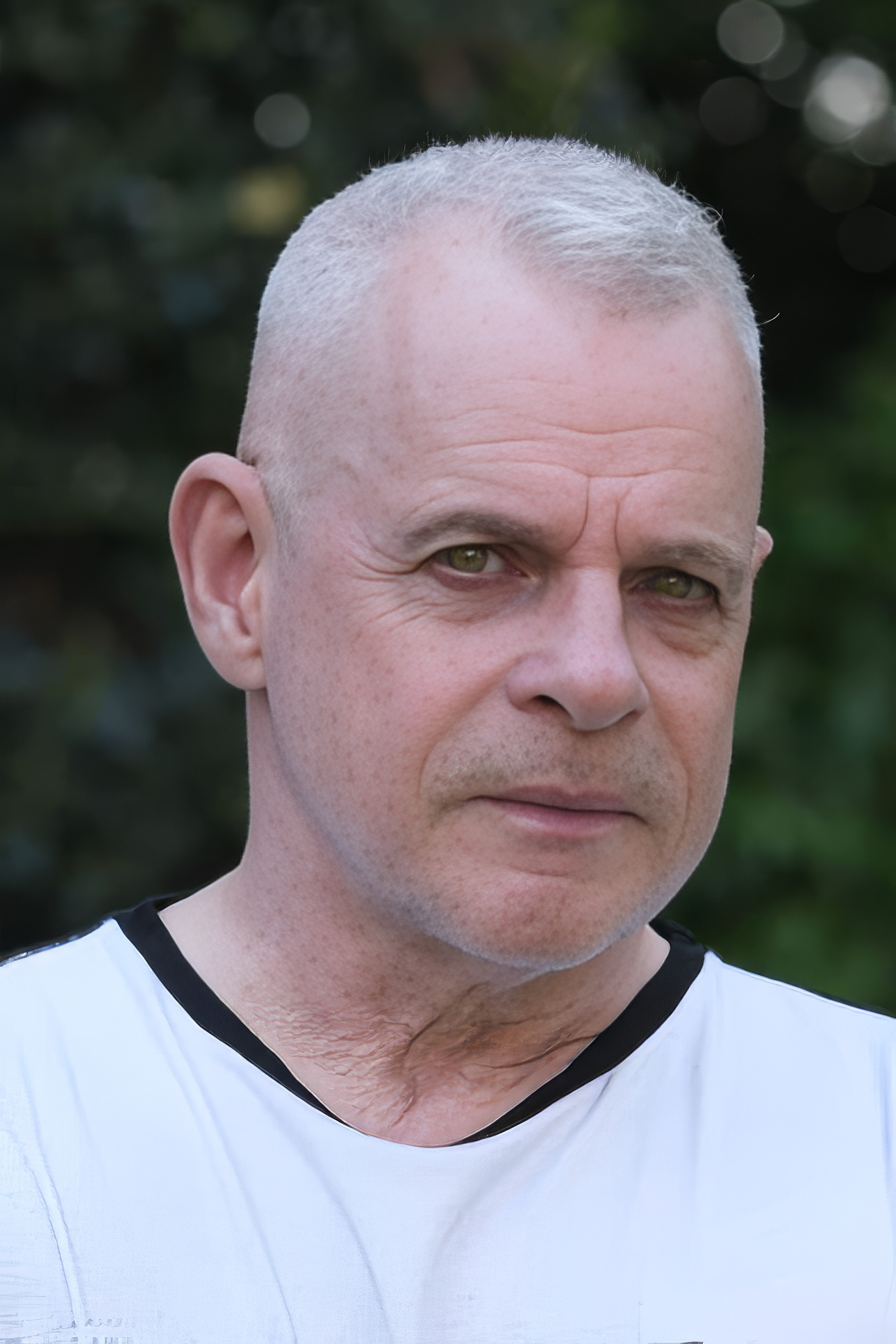
Musical Director Gareth Valentine

Gareth Valentine (born 22 November 1956) is a Welsh composer, arranger, conductor and musical director. He has worked extensively in London's West End on musical productions and also conducted orchestras worldwide including the BBC Concert Orchestra, Welsh National Opera Orchestra, BBC Symphony Orchestra, Pasdeloup orchestra, RPO Concert Orchestra, Queensland Symphony Orchestra, ENB Sinfonia, Orchestre de chambre de Paris, (ENO Orchestra) and many others. After graduating from the Royal College of Music, London, he studied with Sir Peter Pears at Aldeburgh.

== Early life ==
A native of Cefn Mawr, Valentine was educated at Ysgol Rhiwabon, Ruabon, Wrexham, Wales. He then graduated from the Royal College of Music, London, and later studied with Sir Peter Pears at the Advanced School of Singing and Strings Aldeburgh.

== Professional career ==
Valentine was composer and music supervisor for Aladdin, the pantomime, at the Old Vic starring Ian McKellen and Roger Allam. His "Requiem" has been performed worldwide to international acclaim and was recorded at Abbey Road Studios, London. He was music supervisor for the Channel 4 television series "Musicality". He was commissioned to arrange George Gershwin's music for a ballet, Strictly Gershwin, for English National Ballet which was presented in 2008 at the Royal Albert Hall, London and which he also conducted. The Times called the musical contribution "outstanding". Strictly Gershwin was presented by Queensland Ballet (2016) and Tulsa Ballet (2018)

== Credits ==
Valentine has worked extensively in London's West End on many musical productions including:

- Cats
- Miss Saigon
- Cabaret - Aldwych
- Kiss Me, Kate - Victoria Palace & RSC
- Camelot - Covent Garden Festival
- The Baker's Wife (Phoenix)
- My One & Only (Chichester/Piccadilly)
- Chicago - Adelphi/Moscow/Gottenburg/Madrid/Tokyo/Seoul
- Acorn Antiques! (Haymarket)
- Nine - Donmar Warehouse
- Damn Yankees - Adelphi
- Children Will Listen - Colisseum
- Sinatra at the London Palladium - London Palladium
- My One and Only - Piccadilly
- Maria Friedman's Rearranged - Trafalgar
- Closer Than Ever - Vaudeville
- Oh Kay! - Chichester
- Sleep With Friends - UK Tour
- 42nd Street - Theatre Royal
- Oliver! - UK & Canada
- Merrily We Roll Along - Donmar Warehouse
- Anything Goes - West End/National Theatre
- Company - (Donmar/Albery)
- Sondheim At 80 (Donmar at Queen's)
- Kiss of the Spider Woman - West End
- The Pajama Game (Chichester Festival Theatre)
- Guys & Dolls (Chichester Festival Theatre/Savoy)
- National Theatre 50th Anniversary TV event
- Home (National Theatre/The Shed)
- Porgy and Bess - West End/Savoy
- Wicked - (West End/Victoria Palace)
- The King and I - (In the round, Royal Albert Hall with RPO)
- Into The Woods, (Open Air Theatre, Regent's Park)
- End Of The Rainbow (Trafalgar Studios)
- Crazy For You (Novello Theatre, West End)
- Strictly Gershwin (ENB) Albert Hall/National Tour/Tulsa Ballet/Queensland Ballet/Cleveland Ballet)
- Brynfest with Bryn Terfel and WNO Orchestra (RFH)
- City Of Angels (Donmar)
- Singin' In The Rain (Chatelet, Paris)
- Follies (Royal Albert Hall, London)
- 42nd Street (Theatre Royal, Drury Lane/Chatelet/Grand Palais, Paris)
- Ruthless! (Arts Theatre, West End)
- Piaf (Nottingham Playhouse)
- My Fair Lady (ENO, Coliseum)
- Me & My Girl (Chichester Festival Theatre)
- Sweet Charity (Donmar)
- Sound of Music (Chichester Festival Theatre)
- Sinatra The Musical (Birmingham Rep.)
- An Evening With Gareth Valentine (Crazy Coqs)
- A Funny Thing Happened On The Way To The Forum (Lido2, Paris)
- Olivier Awards 2024 (Royal Albert Hall)

== Recordings ==
Album recordings include:

- Love Never Dies
- Musicality
- Anything Goes
- The Baker’s Wife
- Company
- Chicago
- Kiss of the Spiderwoman
- Tonight’s The Night
- Requiem
