= Trevor railway station =

Former railway station in Wrexham, Wales

Trevor

General information
- Location: Trevor, Wrexham; Wales
- Coordinates: 52.974921°N 3.091692°W
- Platforms: 2

Other information
- Status: Disused

History
- Original company: Vale of Llangollen Railway
- Pre-grouping: Great Western Railway
- Post-grouping: Great Western Railway

Key dates
- 2 June 1862: Station opens
- 18 January 1965: Closed to passengers
- 2 Nov 1964: Closed to goods
Location

Trevor railway station was formerly a station on the Ruabon to Barmouth Line in north-east Wales. The line was double track between Ruabon and Llangollen and there was a signal box at Trevor.

According to the Official Handbook of Stations the station handled both goods and passenger traffic in 1956 and the goods yard was equipped with a 3-ton crane.

There were also private sidings from the neighbourhood of the station to the firebrick works in the middle of the village (via a level crossing), and to the Cefn Mawr Monsanto works. The latter also connected to the Pontcysyllte Branch, and via the Rhos Branch eventually rejoined the main line on the outskirts of Wrexham.

== Neighbouring stations ==
Preceding station	Disused railways	Following station
Acrefair	Great Western Railway; Ruabon Barmouth Line	Sun Bank Halt
