= Rhos railway station =

Former railway station in Wrexham, Wales

Rhos

General information
- Location: Rhosllannerchrugog, Wrexham County Borough; Wales
- Coordinates: 53.0152°N 3.0328°W
- Grid reference: SJ307468

Other information
- Status: Disused

History
- Original company: Shrewsbury and Chester Railway
- Pre-grouping: Great Western Railway

Key dates
- 14 October 1848: Opened
- March 1855: Closed
Location

Rhos railway station was a station in Rhosllannerchrugog, Wrexham, Wales on the Shrewsbury and Chester Railway. It was located in a remote spot almost a mile to the east of Rhosllannerchrugog, to the south of a road overbridge which carried Corkscrew Lane, in Pentre Bychan, over the line. The station was opened on 14 October 1848 and closed in March 1855. No trace of this station remains today.

It is not to be confused with another station by the same name which was actually in the village of Rhosllannerchrugog, on the Rhos Branch line from Wrexham through Legacy.

| Preceding station | Disused railways | Following station |
|---|---|---|
| Wrexham General; Line open, station closed | Great Western Railway; Shrewsbury and Chester Railway | Johnstown and Hafod; Line open, station closed |
