= Ysgol Rhiwabon =

State school in Ruabon, Wrexham, Wales

Location
- Pont Adam; Ruabon, Wrexham, LL14 6BT; Wales; 52.9885°N 3.0479°W

Information
- Type: State school
- Motto: Absque Labore Nihil (Nothing Without Labour)
- Established: 1575; 451 years ago
- Headteacher: Mr Patrick Bingham
- Enrollment: 595 (approx.)
- Website: www.ysgolrhiwabon.co.uk

Ysgol Rhiwabon (Welsh for 'Ruabon School') is a comprehensive school in Ruabon, Wrexham, Wales for 11- to 16-year-olds. The headteacher is Melanie Ferron-Evans. In 2003 the Estyn Report concluded that "Ysgol Rhiwabon provides good opportunities for pupils' academic, personal and social development".

In 2009 there were nearly 950 pupils on the school roll but enrollment has fallen substantially in subsequent years to around 600.

In 2015 the school received an unfavorable report from Estyn and a subsequent poor evaluation in January 2016 placed the school in special measures. The school has continued to receive special intervention by the local authority but as of September 2017 was still ranked as "Red" (the lowest available ranking) and continues to require additional support.

In December 2017 the school was removed from special measures and ranked as "Amber".

== History ==
The school was founded in 1575 and was housed in one of the church's outbuildings, The building still exists, but due to expansion the school was relocated to the site on Penycae Road in 1858, with the red terracotta buildings preserved. The comprehensive school was formed in 1967 by amalgamating the existing Ruabon Boys' Grammar School and the Ruabon Girls' Grammar School. The school is now housed in the buildings of the former girls' grammar school. The site of the former boys' grammar school has been redeveloped for housing with the original buildings being conserved and the name "Old school court" was thought up by a pupil of the school

The school underwent a major building project in 2003 which included a then state of the art library and a huge new sports centre; it was opened by ex-pupil Mark Hughes.

== Notable former pupils ==
- Mark Hughes – former Manchester United F.C., Blackburn Rovers F.C. and Wales footballer.
- Gareth Valentine – composer, conductor and musical director.
- Neco Williams – professional footballer for Nottingham Forest and the Wales national football team.

== Awards ==
- ActiveMarc Cymru status by the Sports Council of Wales.
- Rotary Young Citizens’ Award
- Welsh Secondary Schools Association Award for Pastoral Care through Community Partnership
- Schools’ ETC Award 2006

The following awards can be seen displayed on Ysgol Rhiwabon's Awards Page:

- Prince's Teaching Institute (2024) for three subjects and for Leadership
- Prince's Teaching Institute (2023) for Mathematics and History
- Prince's Teaching Institute (2022) for Science
- The Leader (Welsh newspaper) (2023) for Secondary School of the Year Award
- eCadets Bronze Award (2016)
- Governorswales QMbronze Award
- The Basic Skills Agency Quality Mark award
- The Welsh Network of Healthy Schools Schemes award
- The EcoSchools award
- Active Marc Cymru (2012-2015) award
- Incorporated Society of Musicians Bronze award
- eCadets award (2014)
