= River Eitha =

River in Wrexham County Borough, Wales

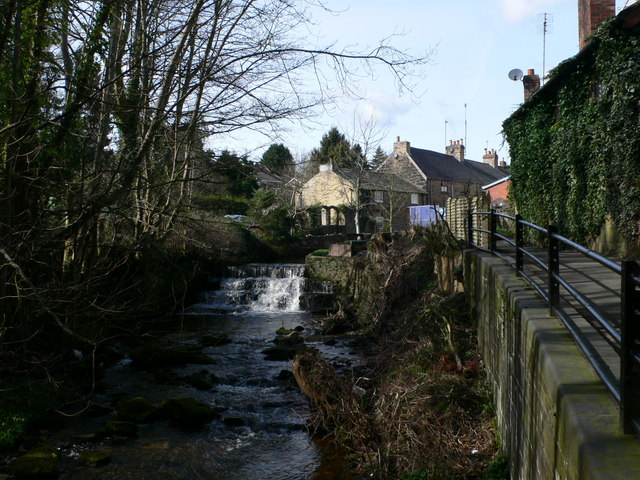
- The Eitha as it passes through Ruabon
- Etymology: Prob. derived from Welsh eithaf, "extremity [of the land]"
- Native name: Afon Eitha (Welsh)

Location
- Country: Wales

Physical characteristics
- Source
  - location: Ruabon Moors, Wrexham County Borough
  - coordinates: 53°0′27.755″N 3°7′57.397″W
  - elevation: 430 m (1,410 ft)
- Mouth
  - location: confluence with River Dee, Wrexham County Borough
  - coordinates: 52°57′42.450″N 3°2′31.494″W
  - elevation: 50 m (160 ft)

The River Eitha (Welsh: Afon Eitha) is a small river in Wrexham County Borough, Wales. It is part of the River Dee catchment. Its name was probably derived from the Welsh word eithaf - "extremity", "farthest".

Sir Cyril Fox, in his surveys of Offa's Dyke and Wat's Dyke, identified a section of the Eitha as forming part of the frontier of Mercia in this area.

== Course ==
The river rises, as the Trefechan Brook, high on the Ruabon Moors in the area known as Newtown Mountain, before flowing through a rather steep valley to two reservoirs above Penycae. At this point it is an important feeder for Dee Valley Water, formerly Wrexham Water. At Penycae, it is joined by the Nant y Crogfyn stream, which also flows down from the slopes of Ruabon Mountain. The Eitha's course then runs south-eastwards to Ruabon, where it was formerly used to power several watermills, passing through the centre of the village. From Ruabon the Eitha passes southwards through a deep, wooded valley within the Wynnstay Estate to join the River Dee near Chirk.
