= Rhos (GWR) railway station =

Disused railway station in Rhosllanerchrugog, Wales

Rhos

General information
- Location: Rhosllanerchrugog, Denbighshire; Wales
- Coordinates: 53.0111°N 3.0626°W
- Grid reference: SJ288465
- Platforms: 1

Other information
- Status: Disused

History
- Original company: Great Western Railway
- Post-grouping: Great Western Railway; British Railways (Western Region)

Key dates
- 1 October 1901: Opened
- 1 January 1931: Closed to passengers
- 14 October 1964: Closed to goods
Location

Rhos (GWR) railway station served the village of Rhosllanerchrugog, Denbighshire (now Wrexham), Wales, from 1901 to 1963 on the Pontcysyllte branch.

== History ==
The station was opened on 1 October 1901 by the Great Western Railway. It was situated at the west end of School Street. On the west side of the line was a siding that served Rhosllanerchrugog Brick Works and the signal box. Passenger services ran from Wrexham, and initially terminated at Rhos Station, with only goods using the Pontcysyllte branch to the south - but from 1905 to 1915 railmotor services were introduced and these ran as far south as Wynn Hall Halt. After this service was withdrawn Rhos again became the terminus for passenger services. The station closed to passengers on 1 January 1931 but it was used during the 1945 Eisteddfod festival from 6 to 12 August. It also was used for football specials until the 1950s. The signal box closed in 1952. The final use of the station was a rail tour on 18 April 1959. Goods traffic ceased on 14 October 1963.

Goods facilities in Rhosllanerchrugog were provided further south at Brook Street, where there was a brick-built goods shed, two sidings and a 1-ton crane. From 1905 to 1915 the passenger services from Wrexham to Rhosllanerchrugog were extended as far South as Wynn Hall, and during this period the Brook Street goods station was raised to passenger status and named Brook Street Halt.

| Preceding station | Disused railways | Following station |
|---|---|---|
| Brook Street Halt; Line and station closed | Great Western Railway; Pontcysyllte branch | Legacy; Line and station closed |
