= Football Association of Wales =

Governing body of football in Wales

UEFA
- Founded: 2 February 1876; 150 years ago
- Headquarters: Cardiff
- FIFA affiliation: 1910–1920; 1924–1928; 1946–present
- UEFA affiliation: 15 June 1954; 72 years ago
- IFAB affiliation: 1886
- President: Mike Jones
- Website: www.faw.cymru/en/

The Football Association of Wales (FAW; Welsh: Cymdeithas Bêl-droed Cymru) is the governing body of football and futsal in Wales, and controls the Wales national football team, its corresponding women's team, as well as the Wales national futsal team. It is a member of FIFA, UEFA and the IFAB.

Established in 1876, it is the third-oldest national association in the world, and one of the four associations, along with the English Football Association, Scottish Football Association, and Irish Football Association that make up the International Football Association Board, responsible for the Laws of the Game.

== History ==
=== 19th century ===
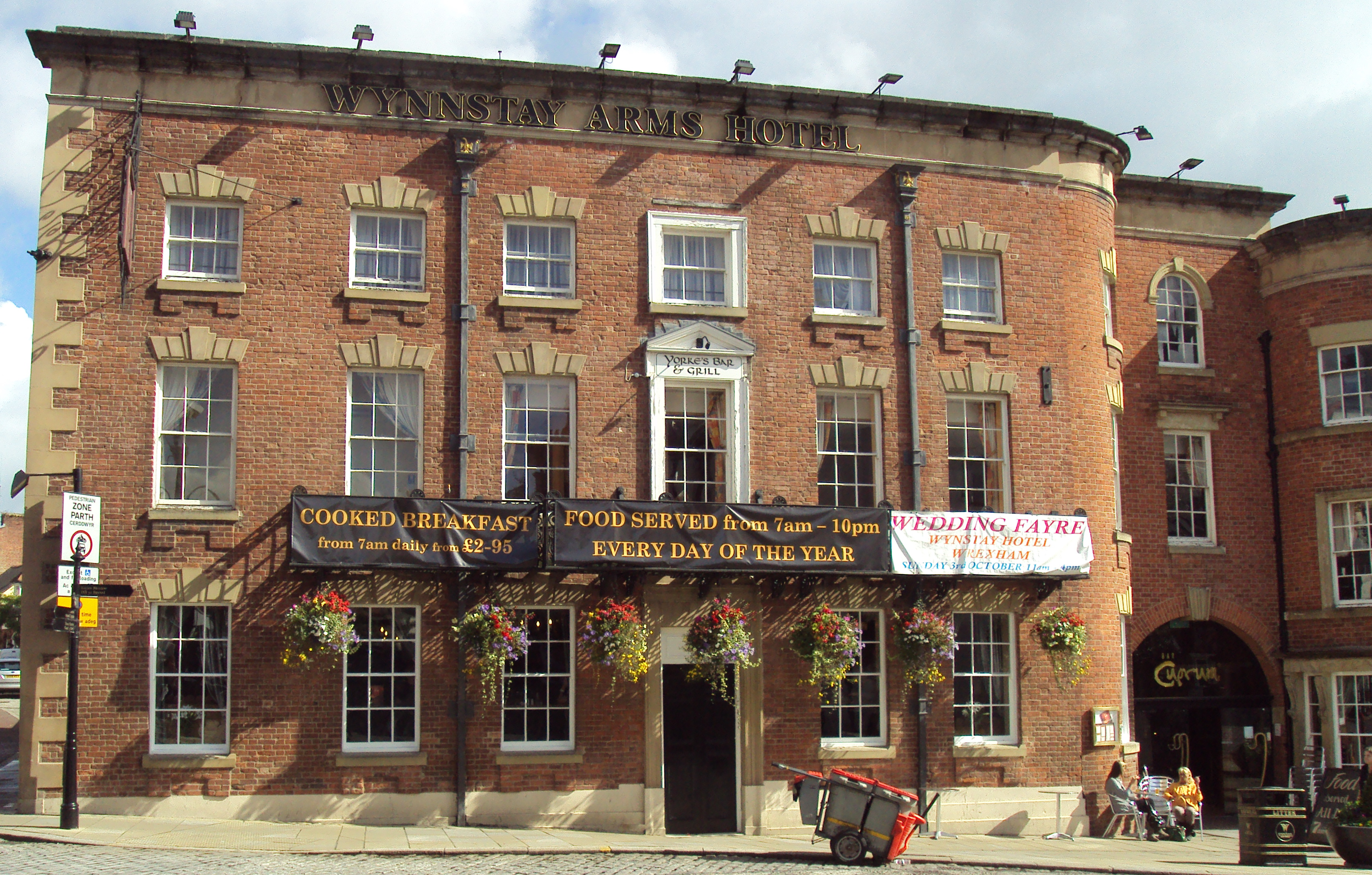
The Wynnstay Arms Hotel, Wrexham, where the FAW was founded

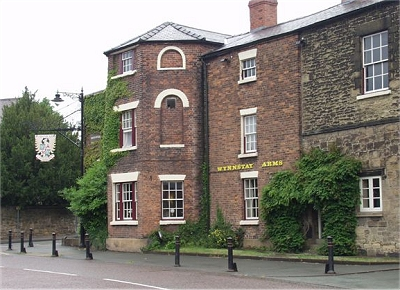
The Wynnstay Arms Hotel, Ruabon, where the constitution of the FAW was agreed upon

The FAW was founded at a meeting held on 2 February 1876 at the Wynnstay Arms Hotel in Wrexham, initially to formalise the arrangements for the forthcoming match against Scotland.

In May 1876, a further meeting was called, this time in the ballroom of the Wynnstay Arms Hotel in Ruabon, where the name "Football Association of Wales" was agreed and the constitution drawn up. The arguments and discussions continued so long that the local policeman came in to call time.

"Sadly we have no record of the words actually used by the police constable as he stood sternly surveying the scene in the Wynnstay Arms, Ruabon, on that May night in 1876; but what they amounted to was that even if the gentlemen were busy forming the Football Association of Wales it was past closing time so would they mind forming it somewhere else… "

Sir Watkin Williams-Wynn was in attendance; as the local JP (and also the incumbent Member of Parliament), he went next door, opened the court, extended the hotel's licensing hours and thus enabled the meeting to continue. The meeting ended with Llewelyn Kenrick appointed as the first chairman and honorary secretary, with John Hawley Edwards as first treasurer.

Kenrick continued to serve the FAW until 1884, when he left, probably because of the trend towards professionalism. In 1897, when the FAW secretary was charged with fraud, Kenrick returned to guide the association through the crisis. He made the final break a few months later over the minor issue of the allocation of gate money to Welsh Cup semi-finalists and finalists.

Inspired by the success of the FA Cup, in 1877 the FAW ran the inaugural Welsh Cup competition. The trophy was intended to raise the standard of play and organisation of football in Wales. As such, English border clubs were invited to participate. However the prominent north–south divide within Wales meant that the association did not set up a national league.

=== 20th century ===
By the 20th century, Wales's senior clubs were competing in English league competitions, thus reducing the importance of the lower standard and less glamorous Welsh Cup. The allocation of a place in the European Cup Winners Cup from 1960 did boost interest in the competition, but it has remained secondary in the priorities of Wales' leading clubs.

The FAW is financially reliant on the proceeds of international matches. A lack of success on the pitch, Wales' unstable economy and a recurring inability to pick its star players have all meant that the association has struggled to achieve financial security. In the second half of the 20th century this was compounded by a failure to take full advantage of the new commercial and television opportunities that the wider game has enjoyed. On occasions financial problems have led the FAW to stage Wales' home matches in English stadia, whose capacities were larger than at domestic grounds.

The FAW's inability to always pick the best players for the national side was rooted in the Welsh game's subservience to English football. The FAW had no powers to demand players employed outside Wales be released for its international games. With Wales' best players mostly employed by English clubs, her national team was reliant on clubs' willingness to release players. This caused recurring tensions as the Football League and its clubs tried to impose their authority over the national associations.

Many of the FAW's members have also always been affiliated to the FA, thus creating an uncertainty over the association's responsibilities and powers. Its unwillingness and inability to assert its independence was illustrated by it following the FA out of FIFA in 1919 and 1928, only to rejoin when its English counterpart did so in 1946. Before World War II, like Wales as a whole, the FAW's ambitions for recognition were firmly within a British context. Wales' first international against opponents from beyond Britain was not until a match against France in 1933.

In 1951, which was the association's 75th anniversary, they commissioned a new logo for the team. It was designed by H. Ellis Tomlinson, an English educationist and heraldist. By November of the same year, the design was granted by the College of Arms.

The FAW's internal relationships were no easier, due to a history of tension between members from north and south Wales. Before World War II it did not even have complete control over football in the whole nation. The South Wales and Monmouthshire FA (founded in 1893) essentially acted as an independent association for all purposes except the national team. Although the south was represented on the FAW, the north effectively retained control of its decision-making council until the 1970s. The location of home internationals was the most common source of tension until 1989 when it was decided to hold all home games in the National Stadium at rugby's Cardiff Arms Park. When in 1985 the FAW moved its headquarters from Wrexham in the north to the capital Cardiff, the balance of power shifted firmly to the south.

By the 1980s there was concern within the FAW that its very existence was under threat. There were four independent associations within the UK. This state of affairs was unique, and the result of football's British origins. As pressure grew from non-European associations for a greater say in the running of football, Britain's special position became vulnerable. The case for Wales as a football nation was particularly weak in foreign eyes given the absence of any national league. Thus the FAW founded the League of Wales in 1992 to try to ensure its very future. Over 100 years after the formation of its national association, Wales finally became a football nation with its own national league.

Yet despite the entry to European competitions that the league offered, Welsh clubs playing in England were less than enthusiastic about its prospects, and a prolonged battle with the association began. This ended up in the High Court and defeat for the FAW in its attempt to coerce clubs to join the League of Wales. The league and the FAW emerged with their credibility and finances damaged, while Wales' best teams and players continue to play outside the immediate jurisdiction of their national association.

The 1990s also saw the FAW struggle to establish its credibility with Welsh fans. Its choice of national manager, the weaknesses of its national league and its unmeritocratic committee structure left the association vulnerable to public criticism.

=== 21st century ===
Previous logo used from 2011 to 2019

In the 21st century, the FAW modernised, developed new marketing strategies and concentrated on improving its relationships with fans and on being seen as an important Welsh cultural institution. This centred on its Together Stronger campaign and culminated in qualification for Euro 2016.

The FAW is also responsible for all disciplinary actions against players in teams associated with the FAW. This includes Welsh teams playing in the English football pyramid, superseding the English FA disciplinary system with the exception of Cardiff City and Swansea City A.F.C.

In 2020 the FAW announced a major restructure of the Welsh female domestic leagues after a period of consultation with stakeholders. The statement confirmed that the goal was to "provide competitive women's football appropriate to playing standards, economic means, geographical location, facilities and club structure."

In 2021, chief executive Jonathan Ford lost a FAW board vote of no confidence after facing criticism for hiring Angela van Den Bogerd, due to her role in the Post Office scandal. He stepped down in March of that year, and she resigned shortly afterwards.

In October 2022, the FAW announced it was considering rebranding the Wales national football team as "Cymru", the Welsh language name for Wales, in international events. The association already uses the term in its internal and external communications, including its staff at its base in the Vale of Glamorgan. The association said it was in discussions with UEFA over how to change the name, and were inspired by Turkey's rebrand to Türkiye.

In March 2026, FAW unveiled the 2026 away kit depicting Owain Glyndŵr's Golden dragon (Wyvern) "inspired in part by Y Draig Aur Owain Glyndŵr by Rhŷn Williams", a design which celebrates; "the country’s identity and heritage" and "With a golden dragon across the front of the shirt, Wales will be bringing nothing but fire when they step onto the pitch."

On 3 August 2026, the Football Association of Wales became the first national football association to withdraw its support for Gianni Infantino's re-election as FIFA president at the upcoming 77th FIFA Congress, citing failures in governance, leadership and stakeholder management following the withdrawal of the FIFA Forward Enterprise proposal.

== Structure ==
The FAW is based at Hensol in the Vale of Glamorgan. It is governed by a council, including nineteen councillors who are either elected, or appointed every four years.

In 2012 chief executive Jonathan Ford claimed the FAW had an income of £14 million, funded from FIFA, UEFA, grants, sponsorship and television revenue. All expenditure was on the further development of the game.

In 2013 Dragon Park, the Wales National Football Development Centre, opened in Newport.

== See also ==
- Wales national football team
- List of football clubs in Wales
- Ted Robbins, Secretary of the FAW from 1909 to his death in 1946, the longest serving secretary in the organisation's history
- Noel Mooney, CEO of the FAW
