= Johnstown and Hafod railway station =

Former railway station in Wales

Johnstown & Hafod

General information
- Location: Johnstown & Rhosllannerchrugog, Wrexham; Wales
- Coordinates: 53.0072°N 3.0348°W
- Grid reference: SJ305460
- Platforms: 2

Other information
- Status: Disused

History
- Original company: Great Western Railway
- Pre-grouping: Great Western Railway
- Post-grouping: Great Western Railway

Key dates
- 1896: Station opens
- 1 June 1955: unstaffed
- 12 Sept 1960: station closes
Location

Johnstown & Hafod was a minor station on the Great Western Railway's London to Birkenhead main line. Although the station is gone the railway is still open today as part of the Shrewsbury to Chester Line. The station was situated on the extreme east side of Johnstown and served both there and the adjoining settlement of Rhosllannerchrugog (pron: Ross-thlanner-kri-gog) in Wales.

== Historical services ==
Express trains did not call at Johnstown & Hafod and the station would only have been served by West Midlands & Shrewsbury to Wrexham & Chester local trains. There were once sidings serving Hafod brickworks and Hafod colliery.

== Re-opening plan ==
According to the Scott Wilson Report compiled for the Chester to Shrewsbury Rail Partnership, Johnstown is one of the most promising sites on the line for the re-opening of the station. (The report can be downloaded from the Chester to Shrewsbury Rail Partnership website link below).

== Neighbouring stations ==
Preceding station	Historical railways	Following station
Wynnville Halt	Great Western Railway; Shrewsbury to Chester Line	Rhos
