= Ruabon railway branch lines =

The Ruabon railway branch lines were a network of railways built to serve the mineral bearing area west of Ruabon, which contained many coal and iron deposits, as well as limestone, and a small but dense network of railways developed to handle the minerals.

The Ellesmere Canal connected the area to Chester, for onward transport by coastal shipping. A tramway was opened in 1805 to extend the reach of the canal. When the Shrewsbury and Chester Railway was opened in 1846 – 1848 the transport opportunities were transformed, and railway branch lines were built. The S&CR merged with the Great Western Railway in 1854, and in time all the branches came under GWR control.

Short branches were extended into the area west of Ruabon and for some time formed a dense local network. As the population density increased, a local passenger operation was put on, based on Wrexham, the local market town.

In the period following World War I the mineral industry declined, and the passenger operation was discontinued. Mineral traffic reduced substantially by 1930, and the whole network was closed in 1963.

== Ellesmere Canal ==
The mineral deposits, chiefly coal, iron and limestone, in the area immediately west of Ruabon led to an important, but localised, industry there in the eighteenth century. As the volume of production increased, the inadequacy of road transport facilities became more significant, and this led to the construction of the Ellesmere Canal; it opened to Trevor on 26 November 1805, crossing the River Dee by the Pontcysyllte Aqueduct. The basin at Trevor and the locality in generally came to be known as Pont Cysyllte, later Pontcysyllte. (Note: The village on the south side of the Dee is Froncysyllte.)

== Ruabon Brook Tramway ==
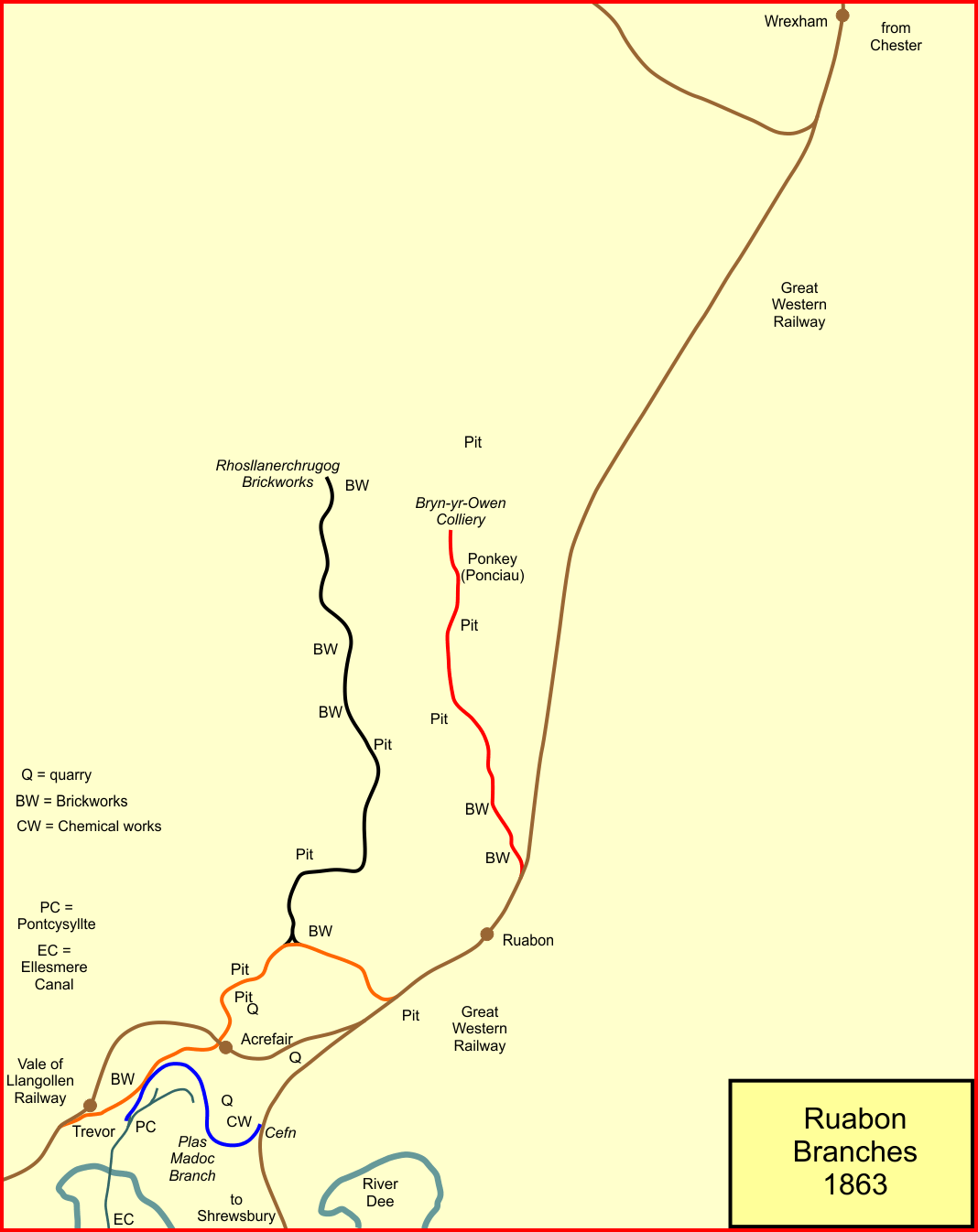
Ruabon area branch lines in 1863

The canal company had considered extending the canal northwards to serve mineral extraction sites, but the terrain was difficult for canals, and it built a horse tramway instead. It had obtained powers on 29 June 1804 to build it, and the tramway opened on the same day as the canal, 26 November 1805, and was known as the Ruabon Brook Tramway.

It ran from the canal at Pontcysyllte to Acrefair village, serving Plas Kynaston quarries, colliery and iron works, and brickworks, on the way. It was extended to Plas Madoc colliery by 1808, and later further extended to the Afon Eitha brook.and the Ruabon Brook (Wynn Hall) colliery, south of Rhosllanerchrugog. The total extent was three miles.

== The Shrewsbury and Chester Railway ==
The Shrewsbury and Chester Railway opened its trunk line northward from Ruabon (actually Rhosymedre, two miles south) to Chester on 2 November 1846. This connected the industry around Ruabon and Wrexham to the River Dee for onward conveyance by coastal shipping. The company extended its line southwards to Shrewsbury in 1848. This transformed the transport situation, and soon the canal had become obsolescent. The Shrewsbury and Chester Railway merged with the Great Western Railway in 1854.

The mineral industry grew rapidly with the improved transport offered by the main line railway, and numerous short branch lines were built to connect to the main line.

== Ffron branch to Castle limeworks ==
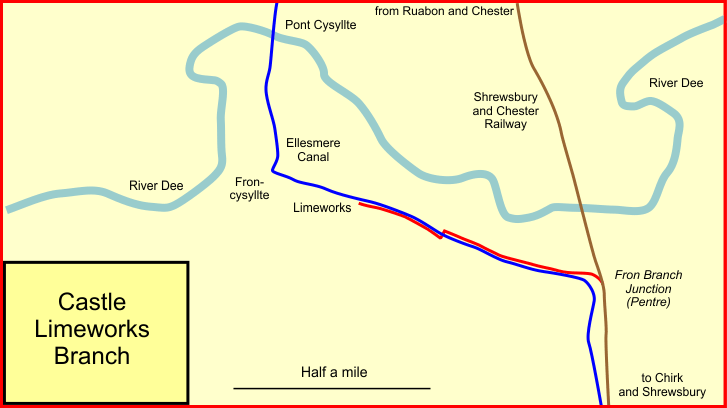
Castle limeworks railway

The Fron branch was a short branch line from Pentre, on the main line. It ran west for 3/4 mile to Chirk Castle Lime Works at Fron, and to a canal wharf near there. It was worked by the Shrewsbury and Chester Railway as part of the main line. Its course was along the north side of the canal, and it then turned at right angles and passed under the canal, immediately resuming its westerly course, now on the south side of the canal. The turns were achieved by wagon turntables.

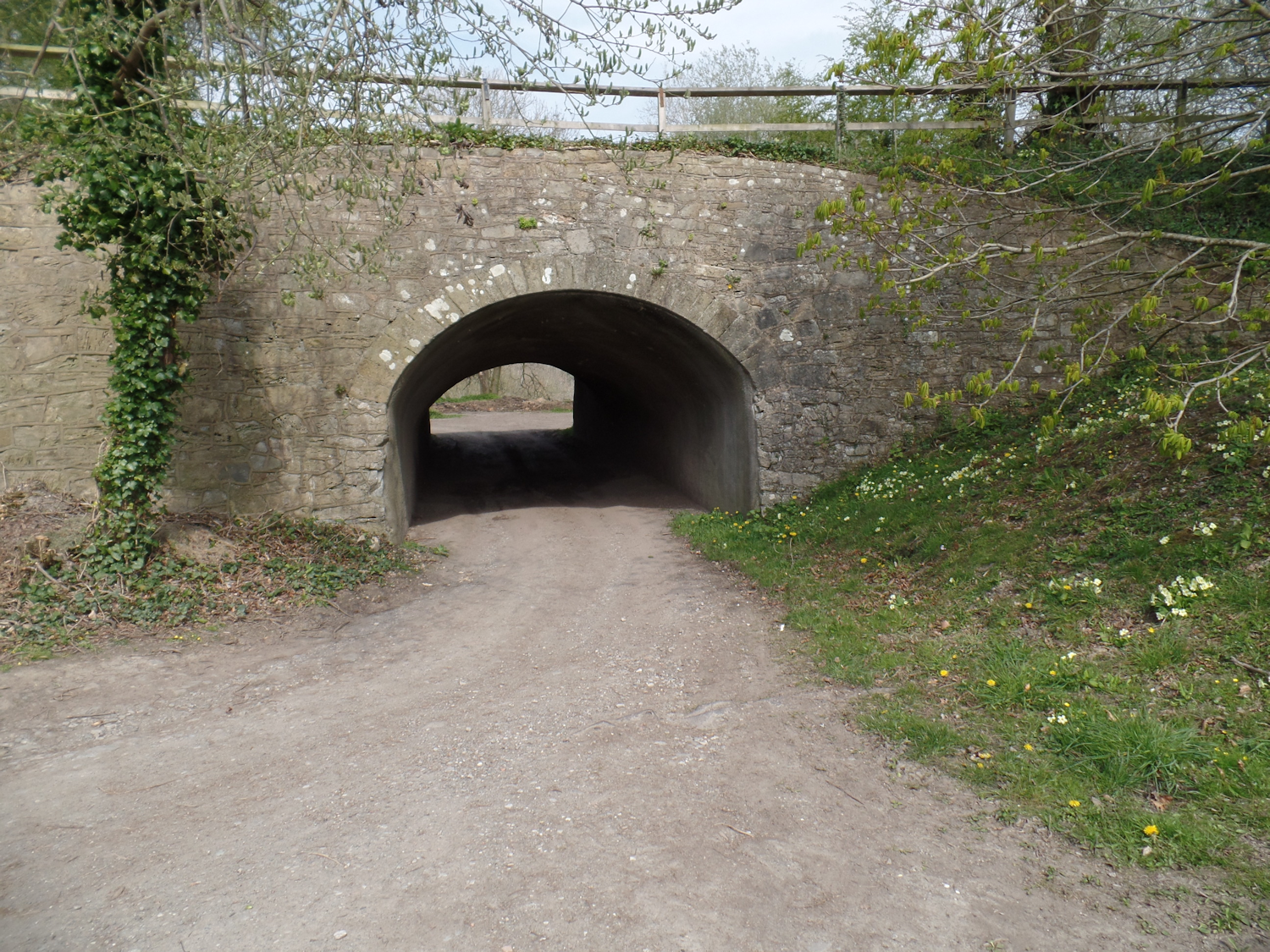
Castle limeworks bridge, Ruabon

It is likely that the line opened soon after the main line opened. A little after the Grouping of 1923 (following the Railways Act 1921, when lime traffic was growing—a contractor was charging 4s od to handle each wagon each way between the Works and the Junction. The line probably closed during World War II.

== Vale of Llangollen Railway ==
The Vale of Llangollen Railway was opened from a junction south of Ruabon to Llangollen, opened in 1861 (goods) and 1862 (passengers). At first simply a short single track branch line, it was later extended to reach Barmouth, and became an important secondary through route.

== Control of the tramway under the LNWR ==
The owning canal joined with others to form the Shropshire Union Railways and Canal Company, and that company leased its network to the London and North Western Railway in 1847. At this early date it was not unusual for main line railway companies to operate horse tramways at mineral sites, and the little tramway system became an isolated outpost of the LNWR, worked locally by the New British Iron Company, owners of Wynnstay Colliery. It had probably been doing so in the horse-tramway period also.

Conversion of the tramway into a proper railway began in 1861, under the control of the London and North Western Railway. Work began at Pontcysyllte and continued north in stages to Afon Eitha, connecting several short branches to pits and factories, and the final one from Wynn Hall Colliery to Llwyneinion Brickworks, just north of where Rhos station was later built. From completion on 30 January 1867, the railway was worked by the New British Iron Company, which owned Wynnstay Colliery, a major source of traffic until the colliery closed in 1886.

In 1896 the Great Western Railway purchased the former tramway network, by agreement dated 12 February 1896, for the sum of £51,000.

== Plas Madoc branch line ==
The Plas Madoc branch ran from the GWR line half a mile south of Ruabon to Plas Madoc colliery; it had been built privately, by the coalowner. By the 1880s it was extended across the Ruabon Brook line, crossing it on the level near Plâs y Waen, to brickworks north of Acrefair. Worked at this later period with traffic to and from Delph Brickworks, about two miles from the Shrewsbury and Chester line as part of the GWR, it was formally acquired by them from the LNWR in about 1896.

== Ponkey and Pontcysyllte branch lines ==
In 1861 the GWR opened a further branch: from a junction just north of Ruabon station to serve blast furnaces at Ponciau (then known as Ponkey) and Aberderfyn, opening on 1 August 1861, and on 27 August 1876 the line was extended to Legacy Colliery. (Note: From Baughan, page 61; he mentions that MacDermot gives 27 August 1876 for the latter date.)

In 1896 the GWR purchased the Pontcysyllte line; this was to forestall a feared incursion by the Wrexham, Mold and Connah's Quay Railway. The handover took place on 12 February 1896, and the LNWR branch engine returned to its home network.

The GWR later obtained authorisation to construct a branch line (the "Rhos" branch) from a junction south of Wrexham to Legacy, making new connections there with the Ponkey branch and the Plas Madoc branch. This new group of branches opened on 1 October 1901.

The Pontcysyllte line was extended at the south end to Trevor goods yard on the Ruabon-Llangollen line. A quarter-mile section between the station and Trefynant brickworks had been constructed by the owners, J. C. Edwards, and the GWR worked over it by agreement, for goods traffic only.

== Development ==
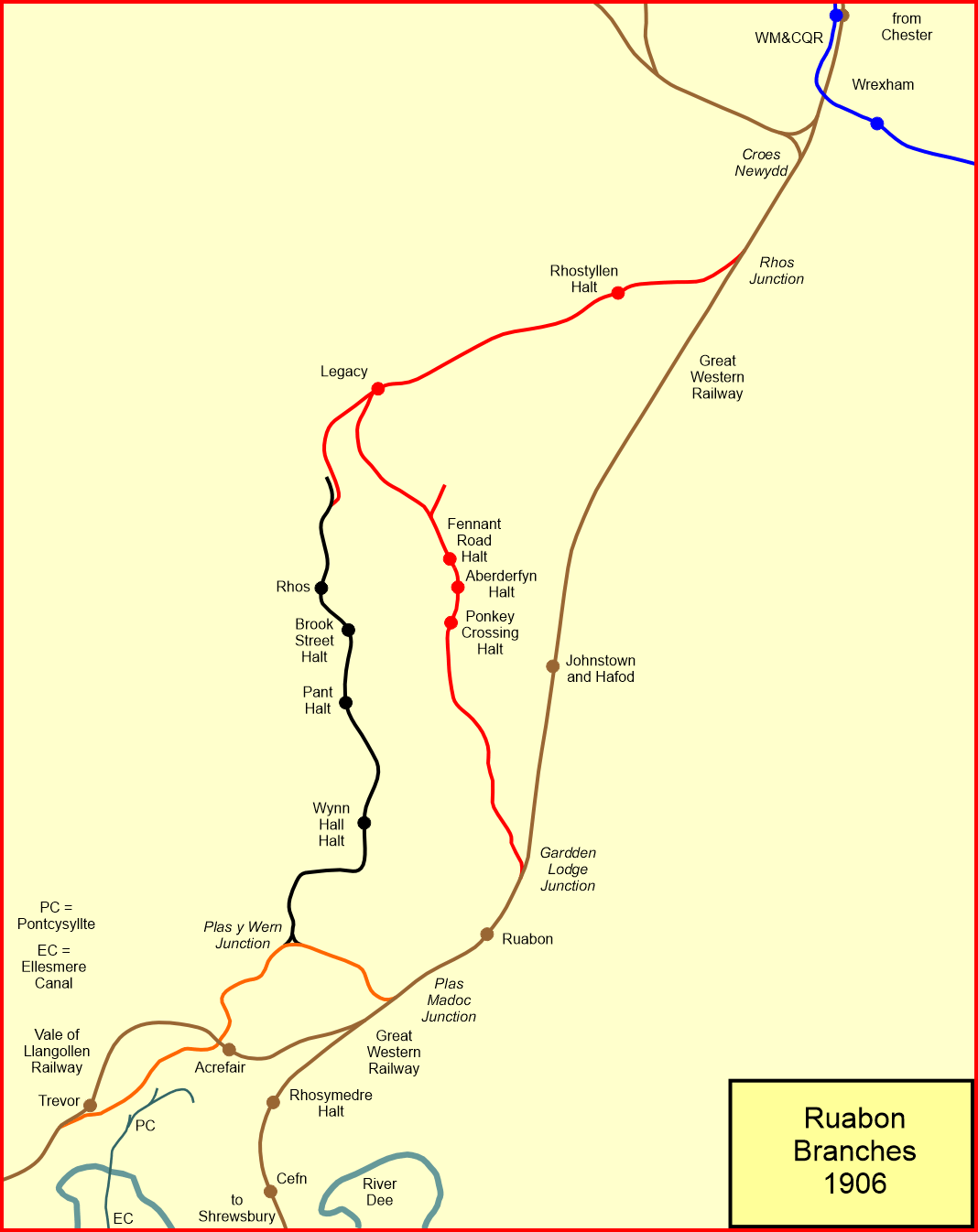
Ruabon area branch lines in 1906

The Great Western Railway made several efforts to operate worthwhile passenger services, but buses and the Wrexham-Rhos electric street tramway developed as stiff competition. Passenger trains were introduced between Wrexham and Rhos in 1901. As elsewhere on the GWR system, railmotors enabled a passenger service on local routes where patronage was not heavy; from 1 May 1905 a passenger service ran on the Pontcysyllte branch, and from 5 June 1905 southwards from Legacy on the Ponkey branch.

The northern section of that line survived until World War I; the Wrexham-Rhos passenger service ceased in 1930.

The public timetable for 1910 shows 11 trains from Wynn Hall Halt to Wrexham, with two additional trains on Saturdays. Two more trains started from Rhos. There were 11 from Ponkey. Most of the trains are shown from both Wynn Hall Halt and Ponkey; the timetable of the period does not show whether a service runs through, and it is likely that one or other of the arms of the service required a change at Rhos.

== Service reductions and closure ==
Retrenchment in World War I resulted in the railmotor halts closing, on 22 March 1915, as well as severance of the Ponkey to Legacy connection, on 18 January 1917. The Ruabon end of the Ponkey branch continued, serving private sidings: there were two brickworks, a petroleum company siding, and those of a furniture factory and the Rhos Gas Company.

Later a short siding was laid at the Legacy end to provide access from the Rhos branch to a substation of the North Wales Power Company.

Wrexham to Rhos passenger trains continued running until 30 December 1930.

The line between Pontcysyllte and Pant closed in 1953, a mineral service then operating from the north end; this was closed throughout on 14 October 1963.

The Ponkey line north of the Bryn-yr-Owen colliery connection at Aberderfyn closed in 1917; the line, then fed from the south end, was cut back to Ruabon Brick Works (latterly known as Jenks) in 1954, and completely closed in 1964.

== Passenger station list ==
=== Wynn Hall route ===
- from Trevor; no through passenger service;
- Wynn Hall Halt; opened 1 May 1905; closed 22 March 1915;
- Pant Halt; opened 1 May 1905; closed 22 March 1915;
- Brook Street Halt; opened 1 May 1905; closed 22 March 1915;
- Rhos; opened 1 October 1901; closed 1 January 1931;
- Legacy; opened 1 October 1901; closed 1 January 1931;
- Rhostyllen Halt; opened 1 October 1901; closed 1 January 1931;
- Wrexham; main line station.

=== Ponkey route ===
- from Ruabon; no through passenger service;
- Ponkey Crossing Halt; opened October 1907; closed 22 March 1915;
- Aberderfyn Halt; opened October 1907; close 22 March 1915;
- Fennant Road Halt; opened October 1907; closed 22 March 1915;
- Legacy; above.
