= Isaac Daniel Hooson =

Welsh solicitor and poet

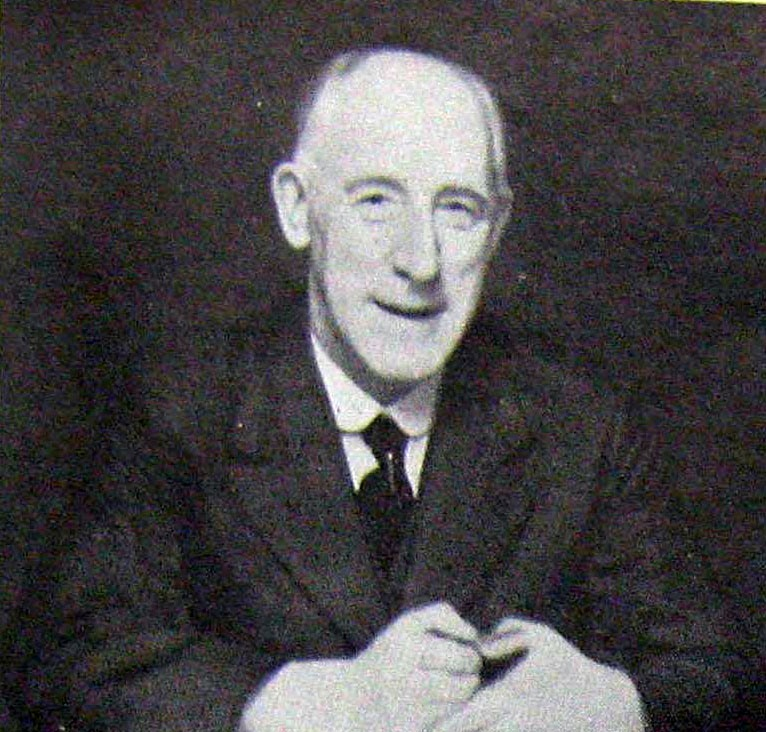
I. D. Hooson, Welsh solicitor and poet.

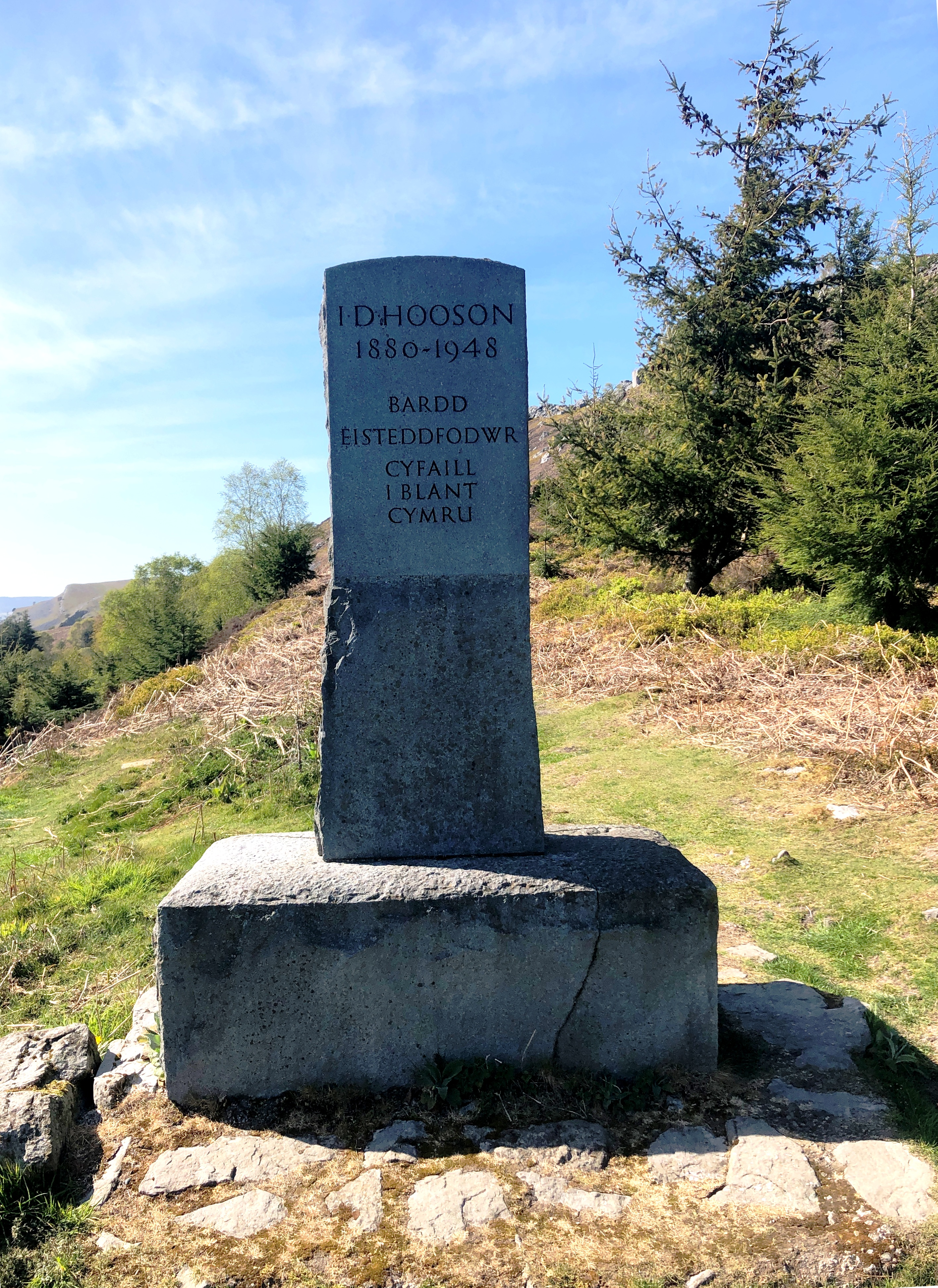
I. D. Hooson Memorial on The 'Panorama Walk', Garth, Trevor.

Isaac Daniel Hooson (2 September 1880 – 18 October 1948), or I. D. Hooson as he was commonly known, was a Welsh solicitor and poet.

== Early life and education ==
Isaac Daniel Hooson was born to Harriet and Edward Hooson in Victoria House, Market St. in the village of Rhosllannerchrugog, Wrexham, Wales on 2 September 1880. He was educated at the Rhos board school and Ruabon Grammar School. His grandfather was one of a group of lead miners who left Cornwall for Wales and settled in Flintshire. Isaac's father Edward moved to Rhosllannerchrugog from Holywell, Flintshire, as an apprentice grocer and, later, set up his own grocers and drapery shop in Rhos.

== Legal career ==
Hooson began work at the solicitors Messrs Morris and Jones in Liverpool in 1897. His father died in 1904, so he returned closer to home and was articled to a Wrexham solicitor. He continued to work there until World War I, during which he served in the Royal Navy. Following his demobilisation in 1919 he became a partner in a firm of solicitors in Wrexham. He was the Official receiver in Bankruptcy in the Chester and North Wales area between 1920 and 1943.

== Poetry ==
Hooson wrote in Welsh, favouring lyrics and ballads. He wrote a significant amount poetry between 1900 and 1914, mostly published in Cymru, a popular monthly arts and literature publication published in North Wales. Founded in 1891 by Owen M. Edwards, the magazine was important in promoting Welsh cultural patriotism at the end of the 19th century and the beginning of the 20th century.

Following his call up for service in World War I, Hooson abandoned poetry for many years. When he finally returned to writing, he was recognised as "one of Wales's premier poets".

Hooson is best known for his poems written for children and he also wrote a Welsh language adaptation of The Pied Piper of Hamelin under the title Y Fantell Fraith in 1934. During his lifetime he published only one collection of poems, Cerddi a Baledi, written in the years 1930–36 and published in 1936, but a second collection of his work, Y Gwin a Cherddi Eraill, was published after his death in 1948.

He was an active supporter of Urdd Gobaith Cymru, founded in 1922 by Sir Ifan ab Owen Edwards in 1922 to protect the Welsh language. Hooson was a member of the National Eisteddfod council and sat on numerous of its committees. His poetry for children was a favourite at Urdd events.

== Commemoration ==
In compliance with his wishes, I. D. Hooson's ashes were scattered above the eastern end of Panorama Walk in the vale of Llangollen where a stone memorial stands in his memory. The Urdd organised a pilgrimage to the memorial on 4 June 1954. The monument is easily accessed by pathway leading northwestwards from a small roadside parking area [Grid ref: SJ 2471 2480] just west of the cattle grid.

ITV made a programme Hanes I. D. Hooson – Rhosllannerchrugog (The history of I.D. Hooson from Rhosllannerchrugog) in 1960.

Ysgol I D Hooson, in Rhosllanerchrugog, is a Welsh-language school named after the poet.
