= Ruabon Brook Tramway =

Coordinates: 52.97318°N 3.08614°W

The Ruabon Brook Tramway (also known as Jessop's Tramway, and in its later years as the Shropshire Union Tramway) was a Welsh horse-drawn tramway linking the Ruabon coalfield to the Ellesmere Canal at Froncysyllte, with a private extension into the Monsanto works at Cefn Mawr which reconnected to the main line at Trevor. The area was rich in coal, clay and minerals, and this was part of an extensive network in the Ruabon, Minera and Brymbo areas.

== The Tramway (1803-1862) ==
Notice of an application to build the 'railway or road' from 'a certain brook near Ruabon' to the Ellesmere Canal was published in 1803 along with the application to feed the canal with water from the River Dee at Llantysilio. The Ellesmere Canal had been intended to continue up the Moss Valley and a water reservoir had been built there - but when it was clear this extension was not going to happen it became essential to find an alternative water supply and to find a way to tap into the lucrative industry in the area. As superintendent on the canal project William Jessop is likely to have decided on the form of the tramway. The design used flanged wheels and rails much like modern railways, a design which William had introduced in 1789 on a line used by the Charnwood Forest Canal between Loughborough and Nanpantan in Leicestershire. Most tramways of the time were plateways, with L-shaped rails, and plain wheels. The tramway was opened on 26 November 1805 between Pontcysyllte and Acrefair. It was extended in 1808 from Acrefair to the Plas Madoc Colliery in Plasbennion and then into "The Delph" which climbed towards Penycae; after 1808 the tramway advanced to the industrial area around Wynn Hall where there was a colliery and a spelter works (alongside Ruabon Brook - also known as River Eitha).

Around 1812, Thomas Jones opened the Llwyneinion Iron Works, after selling both the Bersham and Ponkey iron works. Unfortunately, he ran into financial troubles in 1829 and there was a forced sale of the Llwyneinion iron works to settle his debts. Among the items listed in the auction are "about 60 rail road waggons" and "5 miles of rail road". From this it seems likely that the many miles of rail road listed in the auction had been used to connect the Llwyneinion iron works to the Ruabon Brook Tramway.

In 1846 and 1847, there were a complicated series of mergers and leases as canal companies combined to try to compete with the railways, which included plans to convert some canals to railways, and at the same time the newly formed London and North Western Railway and the established Great Western Railway competed for business and routes. The net result for the Ruabon Brook Tramway was that in 1847 the LNWR leased the line from the Shropshire Union Railways and Canal Company, and it was under the LNWR that the line was upgraded from a tramway to a railway in stages from 1862. Some details of the tramway prior to conversion to a locomotive hauled railway are revealed by the discussions of the Ruabon and Ellesmere railway bill in 1862. According to this account the line at the time served the Wynn Hall colliery (owner Mr Whalley), Afoneitha colliery (John Wright & Co), Cefn colliery (owner Sir Watkin), Dicken's colliery, Plasisa colliery (S. Giller, Sir Watkin) - which also made bricks. The discussion said that orders 'had been given for converting the Shropshire Union tramway into a locomotive line', 'not for the purpose of connecting with the canal, but more in the hope of connecting them to some railway system in our interest'. From this it is clear that the tramway was horse-drawn throughout its life, on which basis the weight loading, signalling, clearances, and other factors would need to be upgraded before it could pass inspection as a railway. At this time the ability to load rail wagons and send them anywhere in the country in a matter of days, meant the canals were in financial trouble. The conversion of a tramway originally designed to feed the canal trade, to a railway connected to the rail network was very much a sign of the revolution in transport occurring at the time.

== Shropshire Union Railway (1865-1896) ==
While there are several accounts in 1862 that the LNWR planned to convert the horse-drawn tramway to a steam railway, on the occasion of the opening of the rail branch linking the former tramway (and the Trefynant Brick and Tile works) to Trevor station in January 1866, it is stated that the conversion to railway status took place in the summer of 1865. Following the conversion, a portion of the tramway no longer used in Cefn-Mawr became a public nuisance due to rubbish, and was sold to the Wrexham and District Highways Board in January 1867 for £150 to become a road.

Once converted to a railway, the line was usually referred to as the Shropshire Union Railway, and it appears that ownership remained with the Shropshire Union Railways and Canal Company, with the LNWR as operators. It was extended to the brickworks at Llwynenion just North of Rhosllannerchrugog opening on 30 Jan 1867. While it was purely a goods railway, there is an account in 1870 of a Sunday outing of 'children, teachers and friends numbering above 700' who were conveyed to and from the canal basin from Rhos seated in railway trucks.

== Great Western Railway Pontcysyllte Branch (1896-1968) ==
In 1896 the GWR came to an arrangement with the Shropshire Union Railways and Canal Company and the LNWR to purchase the railway for £51,000. The GWR started a daily goods service to Rhos straight away, with a train from Trevor to Rhos in the morning, returning in the evening.

In October 1901 they opened the Rhos Branch from slightly South of Croes Newydd junction via Rhostyllen and Legacy Station; this made a connection with the Pontcysyllte Branch just North of Rhosllannerchrugog and provided a through route for goods traffic. Although the line was intended for goods services, the section between Wynn Hall and Wrexham (via Rhosllannerchrugog) had a railmotor service for passengers between 1905 and 1915, and passenger services from Rhos Station to Wrexham ran until 1931.

The section between Pontcysyllte and Pant closed in 1953 and the track was lifted (as far as the bridge over the Afon Eitha brook) in the late 1950s. The line to the brickworks at Pant and the Goods Yard at Brook Street, Rhosllannerchrugog continued in use, but the entire line from Pant towards Wrexham closed in 1963, and the track was lifted in 1964. At the southern end, Monsanto's private track remained in use until 1968, when the remains of the Ruabon to Barmouth Line closed to goods.

== Bibliography ==
- Forgotten Railways - North and Mid Wales, Rex Christianson 1976, ISBN 0-7153-7059-6
- A Regional History of the Railways of Great Britain - Volume 11: North and Mid Wales, Peter E Baughan 1980, ISBN 0-7153-7850-3
