= Sun Bank Halt railway station =

Former railway station in Wales

Coordinates: 52.9726°N 3.1296°W

Sun Bank Halt

General information
- Location: Sun Bank & Trevor Uchaf, Wrexham; Wales
- Platforms: 2

Other information
- Status: Disused

History
- Pre-grouping: Great Western Railway

Key dates
- 24 Jul 1905: Opened as Garth and Sun Bank Halt
- 1 July 1906: renamed
- 5 Jul 1950: Closed
Location

Sun Bank Halt in Wrexham County Borough, Wales, was a minor station on the Ruabon to Barmouth line. It opened as Garth & Sun Bank Halt in 1905 but was renamed on 1 July 1906. The line was double track and there was never a signal box nor freight facilities here.

On 7 September 1945, the bank of the Llangollen branch of the Shropshire Union Canal failed, causing the trackbed to be washed away near the halt. A mail and freight train, hauled by GWR 4300 Class 2-6-0 No. 6315, was derailed, killing one person (the driver) and injuring two people. A fire broke out, destroying all but the brake van of the train's consist.

== Neighbouring stations ==
Preceding station	Disused railways	Following station
Trevor	Great Western Railway; Ruabon Barmouth Line	Llangollen
