= Wynnstay Arms Hotel, Ruabon =

Historic pub and hotel in Ruabon, Wales

Wynnstay Arms
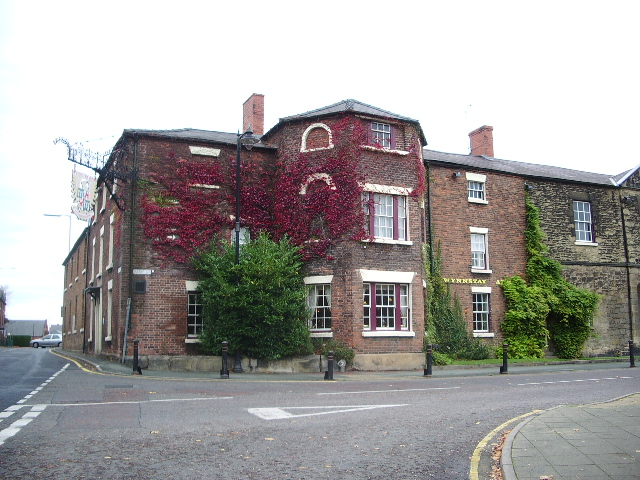
- The front of the hotel from Park Street

General information
- Type: Coaching inn (18th century); Public house Hotel
- Location: Ruabon, Wrexham, Wales
- Coordinates: 52.986854°N 3.03914°W
- Current tenants: Robinsons Brewery
- Opened: 18th century

Technical details
- Floor count: 3

Other information
- Number of suites: 12

Website
- wynnstayarms.pub

Listed Building – Grade II
- Official name: Wynnstay Arms PH
- Designated: 7 June 1963; Amended 22 February 1995
- Reference no.: 1625

The Wynnstay Arms is a hotel and public house in Ruabon, Wales. The Grade II listed building dates from the 18th-century and was a coaching inn. Meetings of the Football Association of Wales were held in the hotel in the 19th century shortly after the organisation was founded in the Wynnstay Arms Hotel, Wrexham.

== Description ==
Located in Ruabon, opposite St. Mary's Church, between Park Street and High Street, it currently serves as a public house and 12-bedroomed hotel run by Robinsons Brewery.

The three-storey Park Street exterior is of dark orange brick in Flemish-bond under a slate roof. The central bay has a hipped roof and tripartite sashes. The interior of the building has been substantially remodelled, although earlier forms of the building's plan survive on its upper floors.

== History ==
The building dates to the 18th century, when it was originally a coaching inn. The building may have incorporated an earlier structure into its design, and the building was enlarged in 1841. Behind the building is the 18th century stable block, which still stands today.

In May 1876, the constitution and name of the Football Association of Wales was agreed during a meeting in the hotel. The meeting was called by a Ruabon solicitor, Llewelyn Kenrick, who became the association's first president. Two and a half hours of the meeting was dedicated to deliberating a goal the Wrexham club had scored against Northwich, which disputed the goal. This objection was over-ruled with changes made to football rules. This Ruabon meeting followed a meeting in February 1876, at the Wynnstay Arms Hotel in Wrexham, where the idea of a Welsh footballing organisation was first raised.

During the Victorian era, utilising the building's centuries-long purpose as a community activity hub, the pub was the meeting place of the Association for Prosecution of Felons' local branch, which encouraged witnesses to come forward following crimes, including offers of rewards for information.

Various chess matches were held in the building, with Joseph Blackburne, a professional chess player, giving an exhibition of his skill, in the building in 1897.

By 2015, there were reports of paranormal activity in the building.
