= Rhostyllen =

Village in Wrexham County Borough, Wales

Coordinates: 53.033°N 3.017°W

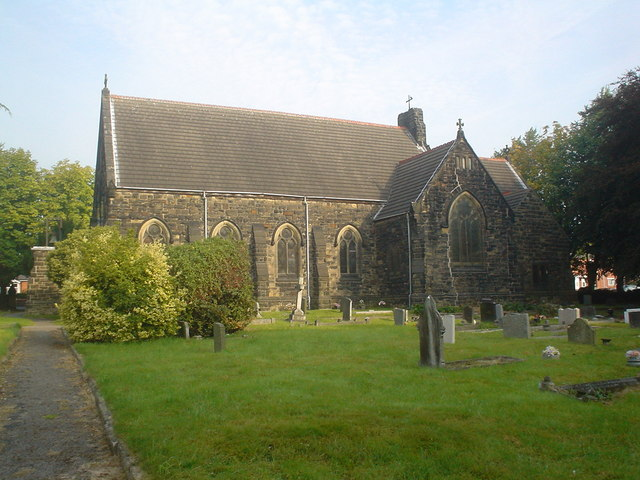
- Holy Trinity, Rhostyllen

- Location within Wrexham
- Population: 1,383 (2001 Census)
- OS grid reference: SJ285515
- Community: Esclusham
- Principal area: Wrexham
- Preserved county: Clwyd
- Country: Wales
- Sovereign state: United Kingdom
- Post town: WREXHAM
- Postcode district: LL13, LL14
- Dialling code: 01978
- Police: North Wales
- Fire: North Wales
- Ambulance: Welsh
- UK Parliament: Clwyd South
- Senedd Cymru – Welsh Parliament: Clwyd South

Rhostyllen (Welsh pronunciation: [r̥ɔˈstəɬɛn]) is a village in Wrexham County Borough, Wales, south-west of the city of Wrexham. At the time of the 2001 census, area Wrexham 014A, which includes Rhostyllen itself, had a population of 1,383 in 599 households.

== Etymology ==
Its name may be derived from the Welsh words rhos ("moor", or "rush pasture") and estyll ("staves" or "planks").

== History ==
Rhostyllen was a part of the old township of Esclusham Below (i.e. "below" Offa's Dyke) and in 1879 was incorporated into the new ecclesiastical parish of Esclusham. The parish church, Holy Trinity, was completed in 1877. The corresponding civil parish of Esclusham became the community of Esclusham in 1974.

Rhostyllen is a former mining village, with Bersham (or Glanyrafon) Colliery, which before closure in December 1986 was the last working coal mine in the Denbighshire coalfield, situated to the east of Wrexham Road. Like other villages in the area, many of its buildings are nineteenth-century miners' houses built in the distinctive local "Ruabon Red" brick. This character is under threat as the village becomes increasingly linked to the outskirts of Wrexham by infill and commercial development along the A483 road.

== Amenities ==
The focal point of the village is the village hall, built in 1924, and its recreation grounds.

== Transport ==
Rhostyllen's railway station was closed to passengers as long ago as 1931; the village was also formerly served by the line of the Wrexham and District Electric Tramways Company, opened in 1903, which ran from Penybryn in Wrexham to Johnstown and Rhosllannerchrugog: the halfway passing loop was situated at the Black Lion in Rhostyllen. Rhostyllen is served by the A483 trunk road.

== Erddig ==
The eighteenth-century house and parkland at Erddig, now owned by the National Trust, is nearby.
