= Ruabon Grammar School =

Coordinates: 52.989°N 3.038°W

- Ruabon, Denbighshire; Wales

Information
- Type: Grammar school
- Motto: Absque Labore Nihil (Latin language: "Nothing Without Labour")
- Established: ante 1575
- Closed: 1967
- Enrollment: 400 (approx.)

Ruabon Grammar School was situated in Ruabon, Denbighshire in north-east Wales. It provided a grammar school education to boys in the parishes of Ruabon and Erbistock. Ruabon Grammar School for Boys became a Denbighshire County secondary school in 1894 and new buildings, including classrooms and laboratories were added in 1896, with further major building works taking place in the 1920s and 1940s.

The school's Latin motto was Absque Labore Nihil (English: Nothing Without Labour). Pupils are divided into four houses: Madog; Cynwrig; Rhuddallt and Wynnstay.

== Founding ==
It was generally assumed that the school was founded in 1575 as this was the date which appeared on the school badge. However, this date is uncertain, as the early school records were completely destroyed in 1858 during the catastrophic fire which gutted Wynnstay, where the records were being kept at the time. Today a date of 1618 is thought to be more accurate.

Records show that Thomas Ednyfed (or Nevitt), a Welshman who had made his fortune as a draper in London, England became one of the first benefactors of the school. The school developed as a boys' boarding school. The school originally stood at the top of Ysgoldy Hill, opposite the church, but in 1858 moved to a new site on the Penycae road between Mill Farm and Offa's Dyke. This new building had classrooms and a kitchen downstairs with dormitories upstairs.

Famous ex-pupils of Ruabon Boys' Grammar School include:

- Malcolm Leslie Bishop, King's Counsel and former Labour candidate for Bath
- W.D. Caroe, architect
- Meredith Edwards, actor
- Nigel Edwards, footballer
- Tom Ellis, Member of Parliament (Labour) for Wrexham from 1970 to 1983 (but defected to the SDP in 1981)
- Brian Griffiths, footballer
- Frank Harris, writer
- Isaac Daniel Hooson, poet and novelist
- Arwel Hughes, composer and conductor
- David Jones, Member of Parliament (Conservative) for Clwyd West and former Secretary of State for Wales
- James Idwal Jones, Member of Parliament (Labour) for Wrexham from 1955 to 1970
- Thomas William Jones (later Lord Maelor), Member of Parliament (Labour) for Merionethshire from 1951 to 1966
- Llewelyn Kenrick, the 'father' of Welsh football.

== Girls' school ==
In 1922 a secondary school for girls, later to be known as the Ruabon Grammar School for Girls, was built adjacent to the boys' school. This was housed in temporary wooden buildings and remained so until a new school was opened, opposite the boys' school, in 1962.

The school's Welsh motto was Gorau Trysor Enw Da (English: The Best Treasure is a Good Name). The pupils were divided into three houses, Offa (green badge) Wynnstay (red badge) and Madoc (yellow badge.)

In 1967 the Ruabon Boys' Grammar School and the Ruabon Girls' Grammar School amalgamated to form the present comprehensive school, Ysgol Rhiwabon. This school is now housed in the buildings of the former girls' grammar school. The site of the former boys' grammar school has been redeveloped for housing with some of the original buildings being conserved.

== Sources ==
- A. N. Palmer, "The History of the Parish of Ruabon"
- T. W. Pritchard, "Remembering Ruabon - Cofio Rhiwabon", 2000
- Dennis W Gilpin, "Ruabon Boys Grammar School - A collection of pictures", 1999
