= Pen-y-cae, Wrexham =

Village in Wales

Pen-y-cae: Penycae
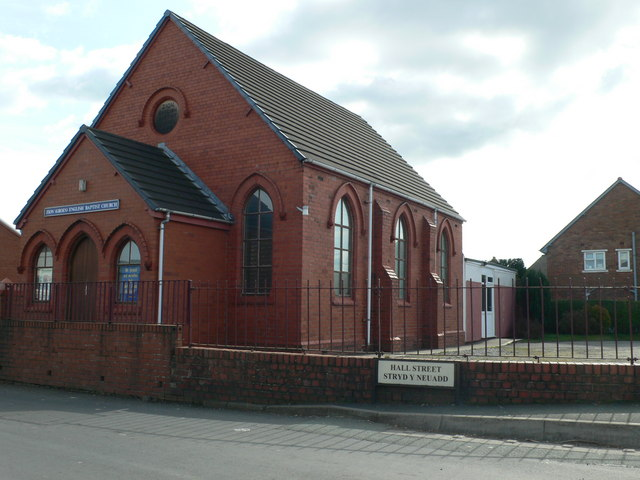
- Zion English Baptist Church, Pen-y-cae

- Location within Wrexham
- Population: 3,389 (2011)
- OS grid reference: SJ279452
- Community: Penycae
- Principal area: Wrexham
- Country: Wales
- Sovereign state: United Kingdom
- Post town: WREXHAM
- Postcode district: LL14
- Dialling code: 01978
- Police: North Wales
- Fire: North Wales
- Ambulance: Welsh
- UK Parliament: Clwyd South
- Senedd Cymru – Welsh Parliament: Clwyd South
- List of places UK Wales Wrexham 52.999°N 3.073°W Map of the community

Pen-y-cae Community Council logo

Pen-y-cae (sometimes spelled Penycae) is a village and community in Wrexham County Borough, Wales. The population of the community taken at the 2011 census was 3,389. It adjoins the larger village of Rhosllanerchrugog.

== Etymology ==
Pen-y-cae means 'head of the field' or 'end of the field'. Although often written as one word without hyphens, in its correct form the name is hyphenised due to the definite article 'y' preceding a single-syllable element.

== History ==
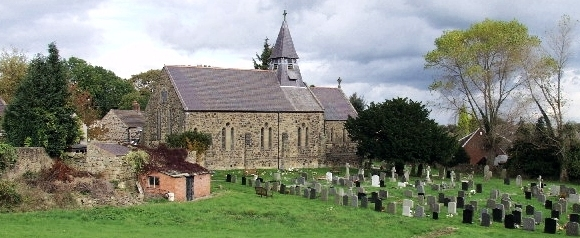
St Thomas' Parish Church

The village was part of the ancient parish of Ruabon and the district was known as Dynhinlle Uchaf (but also known as Y Dref Fechan or Cristionydd Fechan).

The new parish of Pen-y-cae was formed 1879, from parts of the existing parishes of Ruabon, Rhosllanerchrugog and Rhosymedre. St Thomas' Church Penycae, then-Parish Church, was consecrated in 1878. However, most of the population of the parish were nonconformists and attended the Baptist chapels of Salem and Sion in Groes; the Calvinistic Methodist chapels in Groes and Tainant; the Wesleyan chapel of Soar in Stryt Issa; or the Primitive Methodist chapel in Copperas. As well as other historical Methodist chapels nearby on Plas Bennion Road and Newtown Mountain (above Pen-y-cae), as well as a Church of the Nazarene chapel.

== Economy ==
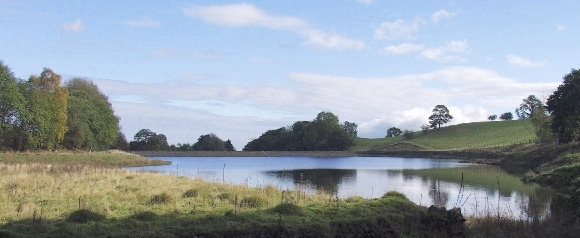
The Pen-y-cae Upper Reservoir

Coal was extracted from pits at Plas Bennion, Wynn Hall, Afon Eitha, Cristionydd, Groes and Plas Isaf; zinc was worked at Copperas. The area descending towards Acrefair was known as "The Delph", it was served by extensions of the Ruabon Brook Tramway but these were mostly defunct by the mid-20th century.

Most inhabitants find employment outside the village in Wrexham with only a few local shops or public buildings providing jobs.

Dee Valley Water operates two reservoirs in Pen-y-cae: Pen-y-cae Upper and Pen-y-cae Lower.

== Transport ==
Wright & Son, ran a bus service from Pen-y-cae to Wrexham via Rhos, and later via Ponciau also. When the bus industry was de-regulated in 1986 there was fierce competition between Wright's and the much larger Crosville company. Wright's, the last surviving independent local company, ceased operations in 1993 leaving Crosville as the sole service provider in the Wrexham area.

Arriva currently operates a bus service to Wrexham Bus Station. The nearest railway station is Ruabon, located two miles away from the village, which has daily services towards Chester and Shrewsbury.

== Notable residents ==
- The Wales and Bolton Wanderers footballer, Robert Roberts, was born in Pen-y-cae in July 1864.

== Bibliography ==
- Dennis W Gilpin, "Rhosllannerchrugog, Johnstown, Ponciau, Pen-y-cae, a collection of pictures - Volume I" (1991)
- Dennis W Gilpin, "Rhosllannerchrugog, Johnstown, Ponciau, Pen-y-cae, a collection of pictures - Volume II" (1992)
- Colin Gibbs, "Clatter of Clogs" (1990)
