= Acrefair =

Village in Wrexham County Borough, Wales

Coordinates: 52.9805°N 3.0758°W

Acrefair: Welsh: Acre-fair
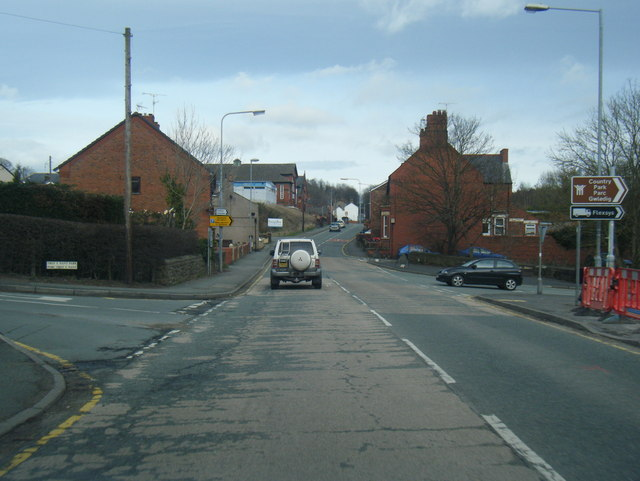
- Llangollen Road in Acrefair

- Location within Wrexham
- OS grid reference: SJ272427
- Community: Cefn
- Principal area: Wrexham
- Preserved county: Clwyd
- Country: Wales
- Sovereign state: United Kingdom
- Post town: WREXHAM
- Postcode district: LL14
- Dialling code: 01978
- Police: North Wales
- Fire: North Wales
- Ambulance: Welsh
- UK Parliament: Montgomeryshire and Glyndŵr
- Senedd Cymru – Welsh Parliament: Clwyd South

Acrefair (Welsh: Acre-fair; [ˌakrɛˈvɑɪr]) is a village in Wrexham County Borough, north-east Wales, in the community of Cefn. It was formerly part of the ancient parish of Ruabon, and is located between Wrexham and Llangollen. It is close to the villages of Trevor, Cefn Mawr, Ruabon and Plas Madoc. The name Acrefair originates from the Welsh word for acres—acrau, or acre in the local Welsh dialect—and Mair, the Welsh name for Mary. The English meaning of Acrefair is Mary's Acres.

Parts of Acrefair have views across the River Dee and the Dee Valley.

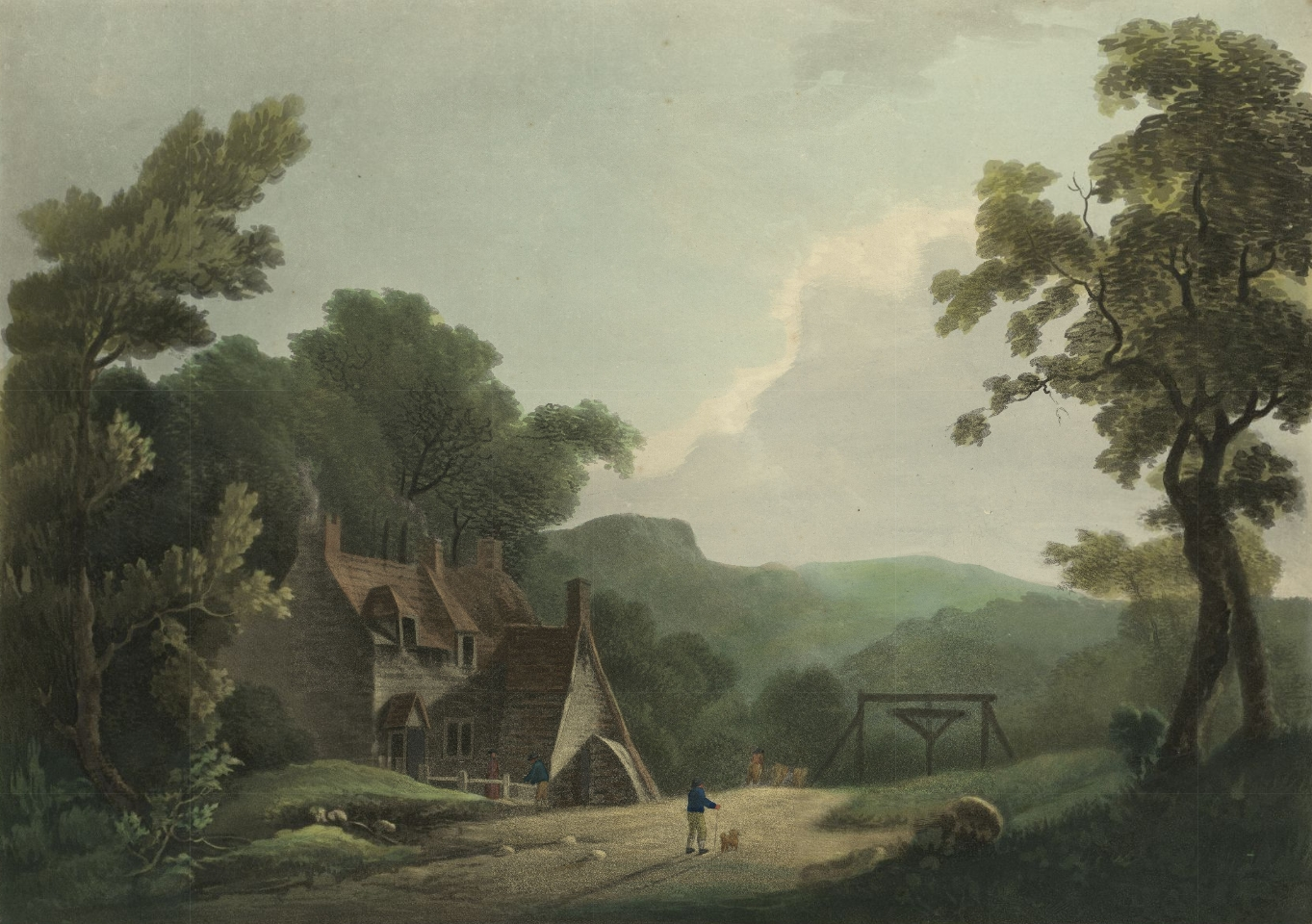
Acrefair in 1794, Engraving Francis Jukes after Thomas Walmsley.

Acrefair has a chemist, kebab shop and two Chinese take-aways and once had a petrol station and newsagents / post office. It boasts many buildings built from "Ruabon Red brick", including several chapels which are now closed and converted.

Edward Lloyd Rowland established an ironworks in Acrefair in 1817. Following his bankruptcy in 1825, the works were bought by the British Iron Company. The company was re-formed in 1843 as the New British Iron Company and they continued to operate the works until its closure in 1887. The site was subsequently occupied by a succession of businesses, ancluding Hughes and Lancaster in the mid-20th centurty and latterly Air Products, which produced air separation and cryogenic storage equipment. The site ceased commercial operations in late 2009.

Acrefair and Cefn Mawr were also home to the Monsanto Company chemical works, which had produced chemicals since before World War II. The site was the American company's first venture in Europe. Monsanto later operated the site as FlexSys, one of their subsidiaries, but production on this site ceased in 2010.

Coal, clay and iron were also worked in the area during its industrial period.

Acrefair railway station was formerly a station on the Ruabon–Barmouth line, it closed to passengers on 18 January 1965 as part of the Beeching Axe. The Ruabon Brook Tramway passed through the village at street level, serving the Monsanto works and other local industry.
