= Ruabon =

Village in Wales

Ruabon: Welsh: Rhiwabon
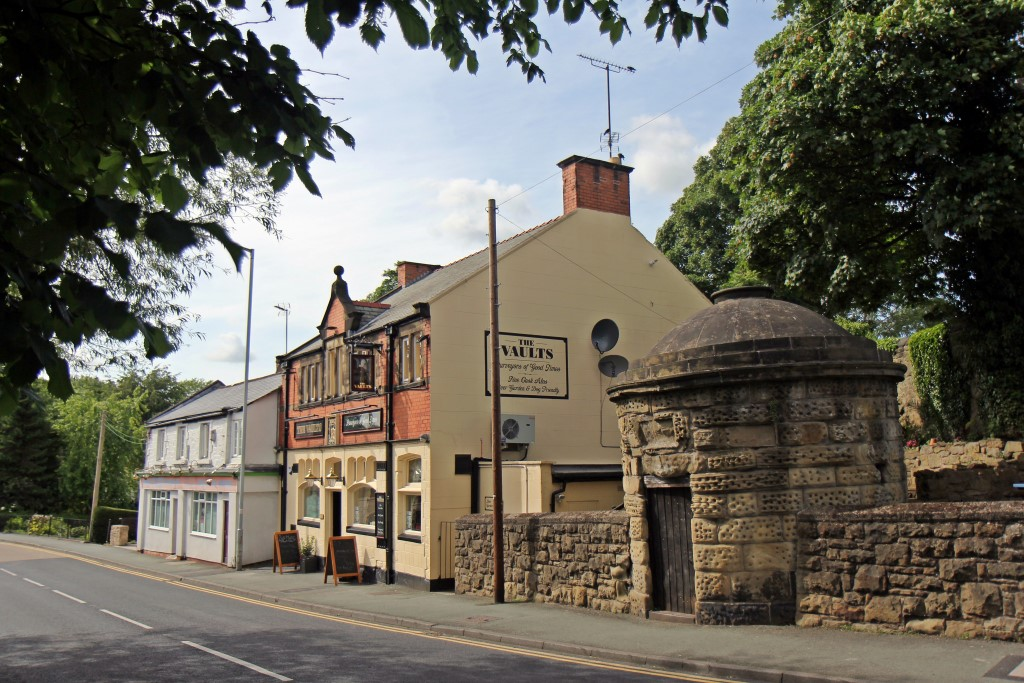
- The Vaults public house and the roundhouse, Ruabon

- Location within Wrexham
- Population: 4,274 (2011 Census)
- OS grid reference: SJ303438
- Community: Ruabon
- Principal area: Wrexham
- Preserved county: Clwyd
- Country: Wales
- Sovereign state: United Kingdom
- Post town: WREXHAM
- Postcode district: LL14
- Dialling code: 01978
- Police: North Wales
- Fire: North Wales
- Ambulance: Welsh
- UK Parliament: Montgomeryshire and Glyndŵr
- Senedd Cymru – Welsh Parliament: Clwyd South
- List of places UK Wales Wrexham 52.986°N 3.039°W Map of the community

Ruabon (/ruˈæbən/ roo-AB-ən; Welsh: Rhiwabon pronounced [r̥ɪʊˈaːbɔn]) is a village and community in Wrexham County Borough, Wales. The name comes from Rhiw Fabon, rhiw being the Welsh word for "slope" or "hillside" and Fabon being a mutation from St Mabon, the original church name, of earlier, Celtic origin. An older English spelling, Rhuabon, can sometimes be seen.

From the mid-19th century, Ruabon became famous across the UK, for its red bricks and terracotta, which earnt the village the nickname "Terracottapolis". The local discovery of high-quality Etruria marl clay led to the rise of the Dennis Ruabon Tile Factory, whose durable and richly coloured products were used nationwide. The tiles were used in landmark projects such as Cardiff's Pier Head and Liverpool University's Victoria Building.

In 2001, more than 80% of the population of 2,400 were born in Wales, with 13.6% having some ability in Welsh.

== Early history ==
There is evidence that a settlement existed in Ruabon in the Bronze Age. In 1898, building works in the centre of Ruabon exposed a cist or stone urn containing cremated human remains dating from 2000 years BC. In 1917, the remains of a Bronze Age round barrow were discovered on the playing fields of Ruabon Grammar School; they contained human remains, a flint arrowhead and a bronze axe.

Overlooking Ruabon, the Gardden (Welsh: Caer Ddin) is an ancient hillfort surrounded by circular ditches, dating back to the Iron Age.

== The old parish ==
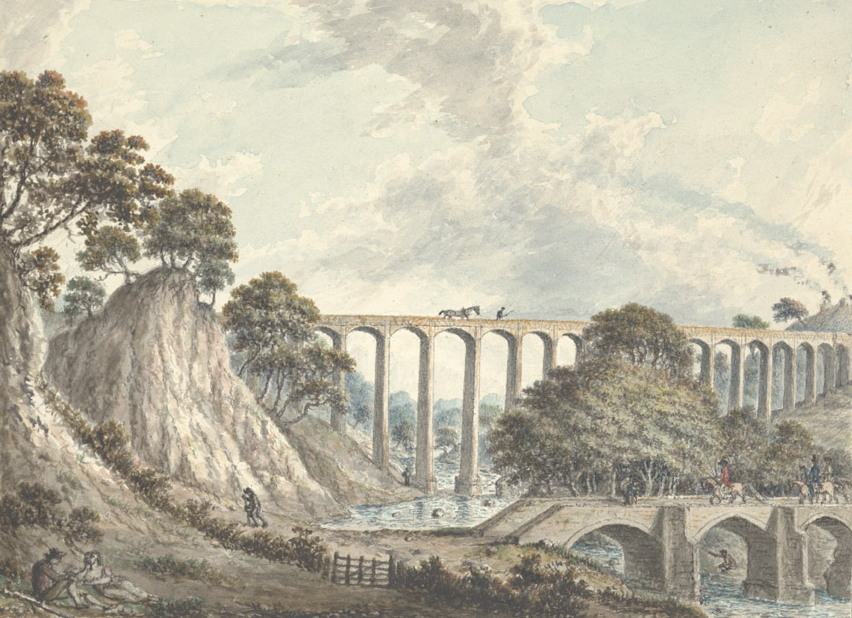
Pontcysyllte bridge and aqueduct near Ruabon, early 19th century

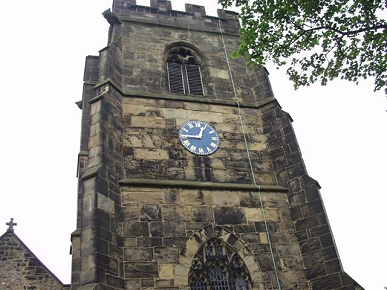
The clock and tower of St Mary's Parish Church

The ancient parish of Ruabon was made up of the townships of Ruabon (which also included the hamlets of Belan, Bodylltyn, Hafod and Rhuddallt), Cristionydd Cynrig (also known as Y Dref Fawr or Cristionydd Kenrick in English), Coed Cristionydd, Cristionydd Fechan (also known as Y Dref Fechan or Dynhinlle Uchaf), Dinhinlle Isaf; Morton Anglicorum (the “English Morton” or Morton Below the Dyke) and Morton Wallichorum (the “Welsh Morton” or Morton Above the Dyke).

In 1844, Coed Cristionydd and part of Cristionydd Cynrig became part of the new parish of Rhosymedre, and Cristionydd Fechan and Moreton Above became part of the new parish of Rhosllannerchrugog. Later in 1879, Dynhinlle Uchaf and the remainder of Cristionydd Cynrig became the new parish of Penycae.

Ruabon is within the historic county of Denbighshire and, between 1889 and 1974, was administered by Denbighshire County Council. From 1974 until 1996, it was administered as part of Clwyd. From 1996, it has been administered as part of the County Borough of Wrexham.

St Mary's is a Grade I listed church, in the churchyard between Bridge Street and Church Street. Included in the listing is the lych gate and churchyard walls. The church is listed on the National Monuments Record of Wales. The parish is in the Mission Area of Offa in the Church in Wales Diocese of St Asaph.

== Wild Wales ==
In the 1850s the English writer George Borrow toured Wales and wrote an account of his journey in the book Wild Wales:

“Rhiwabon … a large village about halfway between Wrexham and Llangollen. I observed in this place nothing remarkable, but an ancient church. My way from hence lay nearly west. I ascended a hill, from the top of which I looked down into a smoky valley. I descended, passing by a great many collieries, in which I observed grimy men working amidst smoke and flame. At the bottom of the hill near a bridge I turned round. A ridge to the east particularly struck my attention; it was covered with dusky edifices, from which proceeded thundering sounds, and puffs of smoke. A woman passed me going towards Rhiwabon; I pointed to the ridge and asked its name; I spoke English. The woman shook her head and replied "Dim Saesneg" (English: "No English"). "This is as it should be", said I to myself; "I now feel I AM in Wales."

== The Wynns of Wynnstay ==
The Williams-Wynn family were major landowners in north and mid-Wales and also across the English border. For centuries they had a great influence on the political, cultural, social and literary life of Wales. Although the family owned several houses throughout Wales, the seat of the family was at Wynnstay in Ruabon. The fifth baronet became so powerful that he was given the unofficial title of "The Prince IN Wales".

Wynnstay had passed into the possession of the Wynn family (as they were then known) through marriage. The estate, originally known simply as Rhiwabon, was owned by the Eyton family who later changed its name to "Watstay". On inheriting the estate, Sir Watkin Williams-Wynn took on the additional surname of Wynn and commissioned the building of a new mansion, to be known as Wynnstay, to replace the original building.

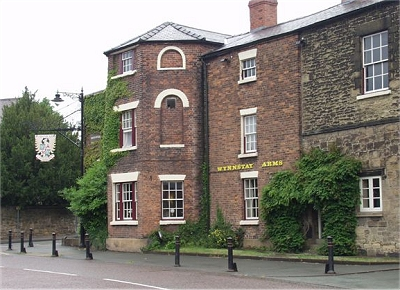
The Wynnstay Arms Hotel with the arms of the Williams-Wynn family on the hanging sign

The arms of the Williams-Wynn family show an eagle with the Welsh motto "Eryr Eryrod Eryri" which translates into English as "The Eagle of Eagles of the Land of Eagles", the "Land of Eagles" being Snowdonia and reflecting the family's origins in that part of Wales.

One of Wales’ greatest harpists was under the patronage of the Williams-Wynns. John Parry (“John Parry Ddall, Rhiwabon”) was born in about 1710 on Pen Llyn and was blind from birth. He lived on the Wynnstay estate but spent much of his time at the family's London home where he performed on the Welsh triple harp for London's cultural elite.

Parts of the grounds were landscaped by Capability Brown and the park was regarded as one of the largest and most important in Wales, containing several important monuments: a column by James Wyatt, erected in 1790 as a memorial to the fourth baronet; the Nant y Belan Tower and the Waterloo Tower.

In 1858, the ‘old’ Wynnstay was destroyed by fire, with many valuable manuscripts being lost. Sir Watkin built a new mansion on the same site. During the Second World War the hall and part of the park became the headquarters for the Royal Engineers Survey, a specialist branch of the RE responsible for providing training for sappers who staffed the mobile Map Production units which were part of all British Army operations. RE Survey moved out in 1946. There was also a fire in the stables adjoining the hall during the same War while the hall was used as billeting for officers.

Because of heavy death duties, the Williams-Wynns moved from Wynnstay to nearby Plas Belan, a house in the estate grounds, and finally left Ruabon forever in 1948, severing a link with Ruabon of over two centuries. Lady Daisy Williams-Wynn continued to live at Belan for much longer than 1948. Much of the estate was put up for sale and the house became a private school, Lindisfarne College (which took its name from the island of Lindisfarne in Northumberland although it had no connection with the island). The school itself closed in bankruptcy in 1994 and the house was converted into luxury flats.

The organ at Wynnstay was built by John Snetzler in 1774 for Sir Watkin Williams-Wynn's London home in St James's Square but was moved to Wynnstay in 1863. During the sale of Wynnstay and its contents, the organ, and many other treasures, were acquired for the nation and are now displayed at the National Museum in Cardiff.

The woodlands within the estate were taken over by the Forestry Commission and the trees were felled and replaced by conifers. Further destruction took place when parts of the estate grounds were built over during the construction of the Ruabon bypass.

== Industry ==
=== Iron works, coal mines and chemical works ===
The Ruabon area was once heavily industrialised with large deposits of iron, coal and clay. Iron was worked in Gyfelia and Cinders as far back as the Middle Ages but heavy industry dominated the entire parish in the 18th and 19th centuries. Coal was extracted from pits at the Green, Plas Madoc, Plas Bennion, Wynn Hall, Afon Eitha, Cristionydd, Groes, Plas Isaf, Plas Kynaston, Gardden, Brandie, Aberderfyn, Ponkey and Rhos, but many of these were hit by flooding in 1846 and ceased production. Later collieries were built at Wynnstay, Vauxhall and Hafod. Hafod Colliery was sunk in 1867 to replace the former Wynnstay Colliery (whose Engine House and Fan House can still be seen on either side of the B5605 to Rhosymedre) after flooding caused it to close in the 1850s. Hafod, at first called New Ruabon Colliery, was once the biggest employer in the area. It closed in 1968. The colliery's coal tip has since been preserved as Parc Bonc yr Hafod. The last colliery to work the Ruabon coalfield was Bersham, which at one stage connected with Hafod underground, and closed in December 1986.

Iron was worked at Ruabon, Acrefair, Cefn Mawr and Plas Madoc, and zinc at Wynn Hall. One of the main companies was the British Iron Company and their successors, the New British Iron Company, who operated ironworks and collieries at Acrefair from 1825 to 1887. In 1867 Robert Graesser, an industrial chemist from Obermosel in Saxony, Germany, established a chemical works at Plas Kynaston in Cefn Mawr to extract paraffin oil and wax from the local shale. This was the start of the long association between the chemical industry and Cefn Mawr.

Much of the mineral wealth of the area was exported by canal over the Pontcysyllte Aqueduct on the Shropshire Union Canal, until the railway reached Ruabon in 1855. The site was later acquired by the American chemical company Monsanto, their first venture in Europe, but in 1995 it was sold and renamed Flexys, a specialist in chemicals and additives for the rubber industry. The site was later operated as Solutia but closed in 2010.

=== Brick and clay works ===
At Afongoch there were three clay companies very close together:

- Monk & Newell was on the east side of the Ruabon–Wrexham road. It closed in the 1920s and the site was later used for housing (Newell Drive) and the adjacent flooded clay pit (Monk's Pool) is now used by a local angling club.
- The Ruabon Brick & Terra Cotta Ltd (also known as Jenks' Terracotta Works or Gwaith Jinks) was on the west side of the Ruabon–Wrexham road (off Tatham Road) with its original clay pit to the east of the road, separated from the Monk & Newell clay pit by the Afon Goch. Founded by the Hague family of the Gardden in about 1883 and managed by Henry Jenks, it produced bricks, chimney pots, finials, cornices and encaustic tiles. It was taken over by Dennis' in the 1960s but closed in the mid-1970s. The works site is now an industrial estate as is the original clay pit.
- The Tatham Brick & Tile Works or Afongoch & Tatham Tileries was at Afongoch, on the west side of the Ruabon–Wrexham road, off Tatham Road. Opened about 1860 by Henry Richard Bowers & Co. of Penbedw, Acrefair, it produced bricks, pipes and chimney pots. It closed about 1910 when the clay pit was taken over by Jenks' Terracotta Works. The clay pit is now occupied by a closed landfill managed by FCC Environment.

At Hafod, the Cornish engineer Henry Dennis founded a clay works next to the Hafod Colliery. The Dennis Company became world-famous for its tiles and still operates today.

At Cinders, the Wynnstay Brickworks was to the right of the Ruabon–Overton road near Cinders Farm. It produced bricks, tiles and drainage pipes for the Wynnstay estate.

Other large brickworks existed at Pant-yr-Ochain, Rhos, Acrefair, Trefor and Newbridge.

== Railways ==
Ruabon railway station is on the Shrewsbury to Chester line which was formerly part of the Great Western Railway from London Paddington to Birkenhead Woodside. Transport for Wales services operate from Ruabon to destinations including Cardiff, Birmingham, Chester, Llandudno and Holyhead. Former services included the Wrexham & Shropshire service to London Marylebone. The railway here was also the junction to the now-closed Ruabon–Barmouth line, along sections of which now run the Llangollen Railway, Bala Lake Railway and the Mawddach Trail, now a cycle track.

Until the 1960s, most of the local industries were connected to one or other of the main lines, or to the Ruabon Brook Tramway (or one of its branches) which followed a route further North between Trevor and Wrexham via Rhosllannerchrugog.

== SS Ruabon ==
The British merchant ship Ruabon, a steamer of 2,004 gross register tons (GRT), was captured and sunk by German U-boat U-20 on 2 May 1916. The ship was torpedoed about 160 miles/258 km W by S of the island of Ushant in Brittany en route from Seville, Spain to Troon, Scotland. The ship was owned by John Cory & Sons of Cardiff.

== Offa's Dyke ==
Substantial remains of Offa's Dyke (Welsh: Clawdd Offa) can be seen on the western outskirts of Ruabon. This massive earthwork, stretching from Chepstow in the south to Prestatyn in the north, is associated with Offa, the 8th-century king of Mercia, and marked the boundary between Saxon Mercia and Celtic Wales.

Traces of an earlier dyke, Wat's Dyke, can be seen on the eastern side of Ruabon. It would be several centuries before the lands to the east of Offa's Dyke would be returned to Wales.

== Governance ==
Maps of the two electoral wards covering Ruabon, the Ruabon electoral ward (left), and Penycae and Ruabon South (right).

Ruabon is also the name of an electoral ward to Wrexham County Borough Council, though the ward only covers the northern part of the community. The southern part of the community (including the south of the Ruabon village) is covered by the Penycae and Ruabon South ward. Each ward elects a county councillor.

== Education ==
Ruabon's first school was the Endowed Grammar School, founded in the early 17th century close to the church. This school later became the Ruabon Grammar School and eventually moved to the outskirts of Ruabon, near Mill Farm. Ruabon Grammar School provided education for boys in the parishes of both Ruabon and Erbistock for several centuries.

In 1922 a girls' grammar school was built, using temporary accommodation, on a site adjacent to the boys' school but they had to wait until 1962 before a permanent school was built nearby. In 1967 both the boys' and girls' grammar schools merged to form Ysgol Rhiwabon, a Comprehensive School.

The Ruabon National School, a Church of England foundation, was built on Overton Road in the late 1840s. It later became St Mary's Church in Wales School and was completely rebuilt on the same site in 1976.

To cope with an expanding population another school was provided by Denbighshire Education Committee on Maes y Llan and opened in 1912. This later became Ysgol Maes y Llan. It was always known as the Council School.

Lindisfarne College, an independent school, moved from Westcliff-on-Sea in Essex to Wynnstay in 1950. The school closed, through bankruptcy, in 1994.

== Modern day ==
The village is home to pubs, small shops and a post office on its high street. A late 17th-century prison or lockup still exists next to the Vaults public house. These were common in rural areas in the 18th and 19th centuries often next to public houses where miscreants were detained while awaiting transport to the nearest town. As of July 2012, an old industrial unit on the former Ruabon Industrial Estate has a planning application submitted by developers Capital & Centric Plc for a new supermarket on the disused site, potentially creating 300 jobs for the area. Ruabon is served by the A483 trunk road which bypasses the settlement just to the east.

== Notable people ==
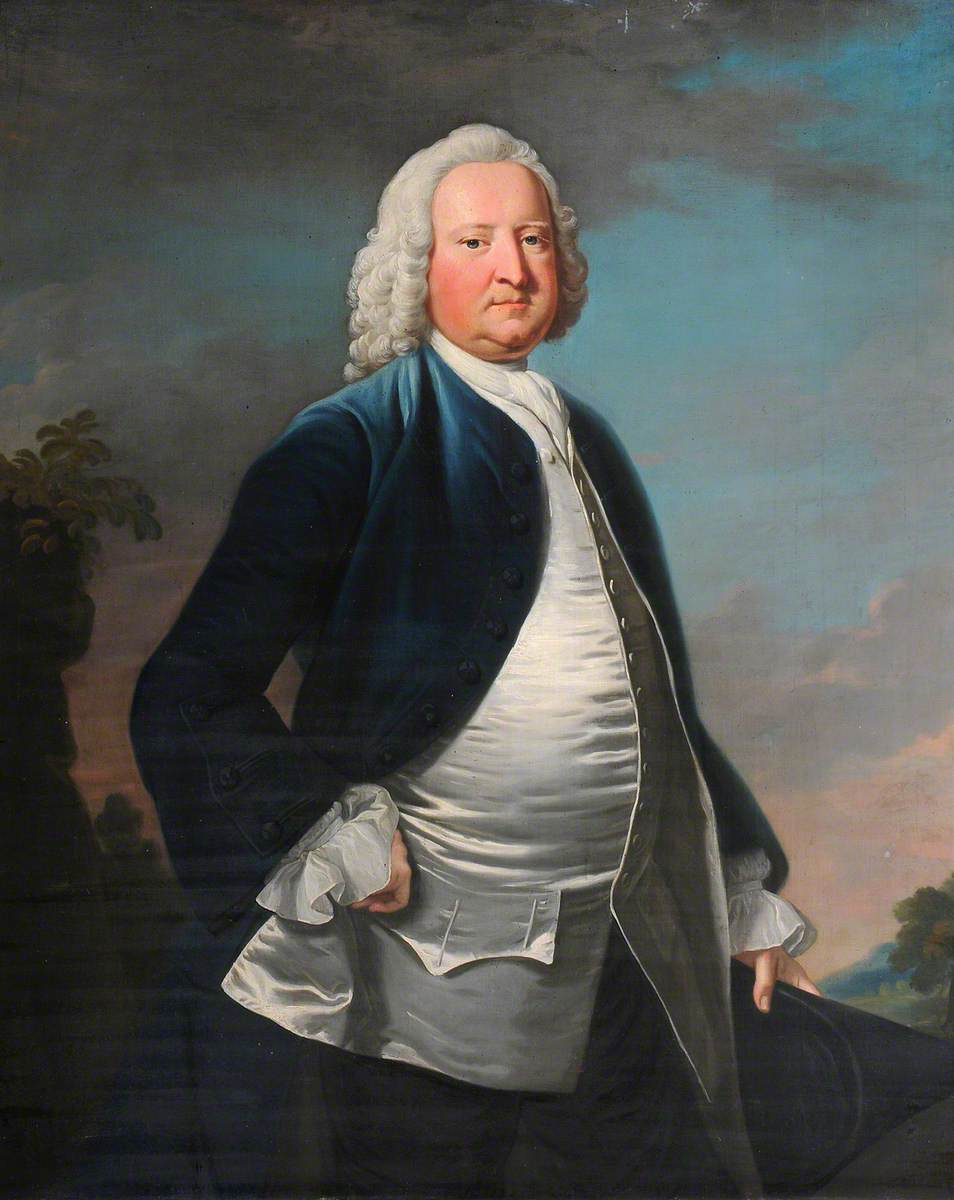
Sir Watkin Williams, 3rd Bt of Llanforda

See Category:People from Ruabon

- Sir John Wynn, 1st Baronet (1553–1627), Welsh baronet, MP and antiquary.
- Sir Watkin Williams-Wynn, 3rd Baronet (ca.1692 – 1749), politician and landowner.
- John Downman (1750–1824), portrait and subject painter.
- Llewellyn Cadwaladr (1857–1909), operatic tenor, early Gilbert and Sullivan performer
- Isaac Daniel Hooson (1880–1948), poet and novelist, went to Ruabon Grammar School
- Howard Saint (1893–1976), First World War flying ace
- Meredith Edwards (1917–1999), character actor and writer
- Will Roberts (1907–2000), a Welsh industrial artist and expressionist painter
- Alex Carlile, Baron Carlile of Berriew (born 1948), barrister, crossbench peer and MP for Montgomeryshire, 1983 to 1997.

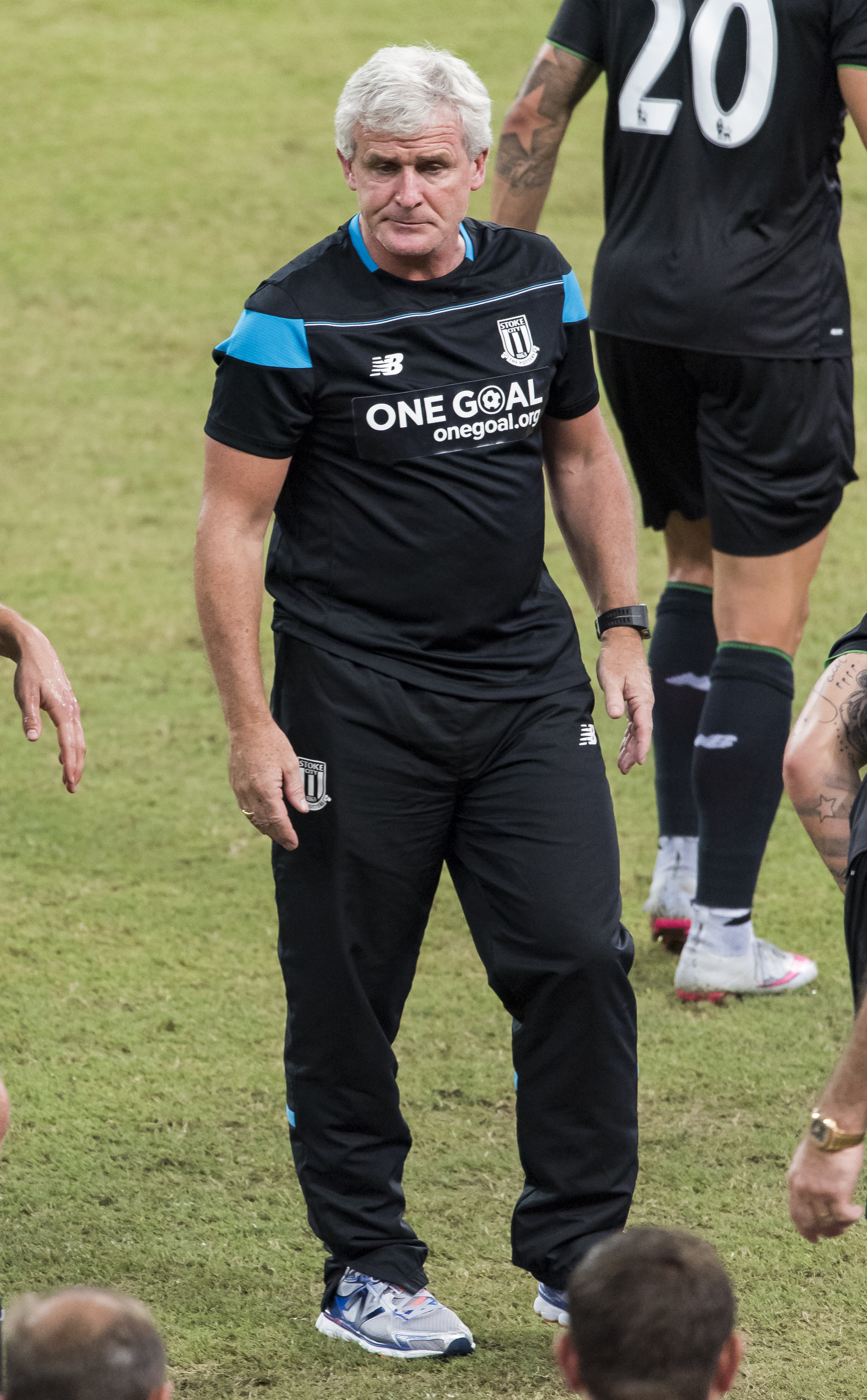
Mark Hughes, 2015

=== Sport ===
- Walter Clopton Wingfield (1833–1912), inventor, British Army officer and pioneer of lawn tennis
- Llewelyn Kenrick (1847–1933), the "Father of Welsh football", born in Wynn Hall
- Brothers David Thomson (1847–1876) and George Thomson (1853–1937), Wales international footballers
- Alfred Payne (1849–1927), cricketer, died at Pen-y-Nant
- Charles Taylor (1863–1915), Royal Navy officer and rugby union player, killed in WWI
- Ted Hughes (1876–1936), footballer with over 150 club caps and 14 for Wales
- Lloyd Davies (1877–1957), footballer with 345 club caps and 16 for Wales
- Mark Hughes (born 1963), football manager and former player with 606 club caps and 72 for Wales

== See also ==
- Pen-Y-Lan Hall, a grade II listed Regency gothic mansion located within the Ruabon parish

== Sources ==
- A. N. Palmer, The History of the Parish of Ruabon
- George Borrow, Wild Wales, 1862
- G. G. Lerry, Collieries of Denbighshire, 1968
- T. W. Pritchard, Remembering Ruabon – Cofio Rhiwabon, 2000
- National Museum of Wales
