= Stryt Las Park =

Park in Wrexham County Borough

- Parc Stryt Las (Welsh)
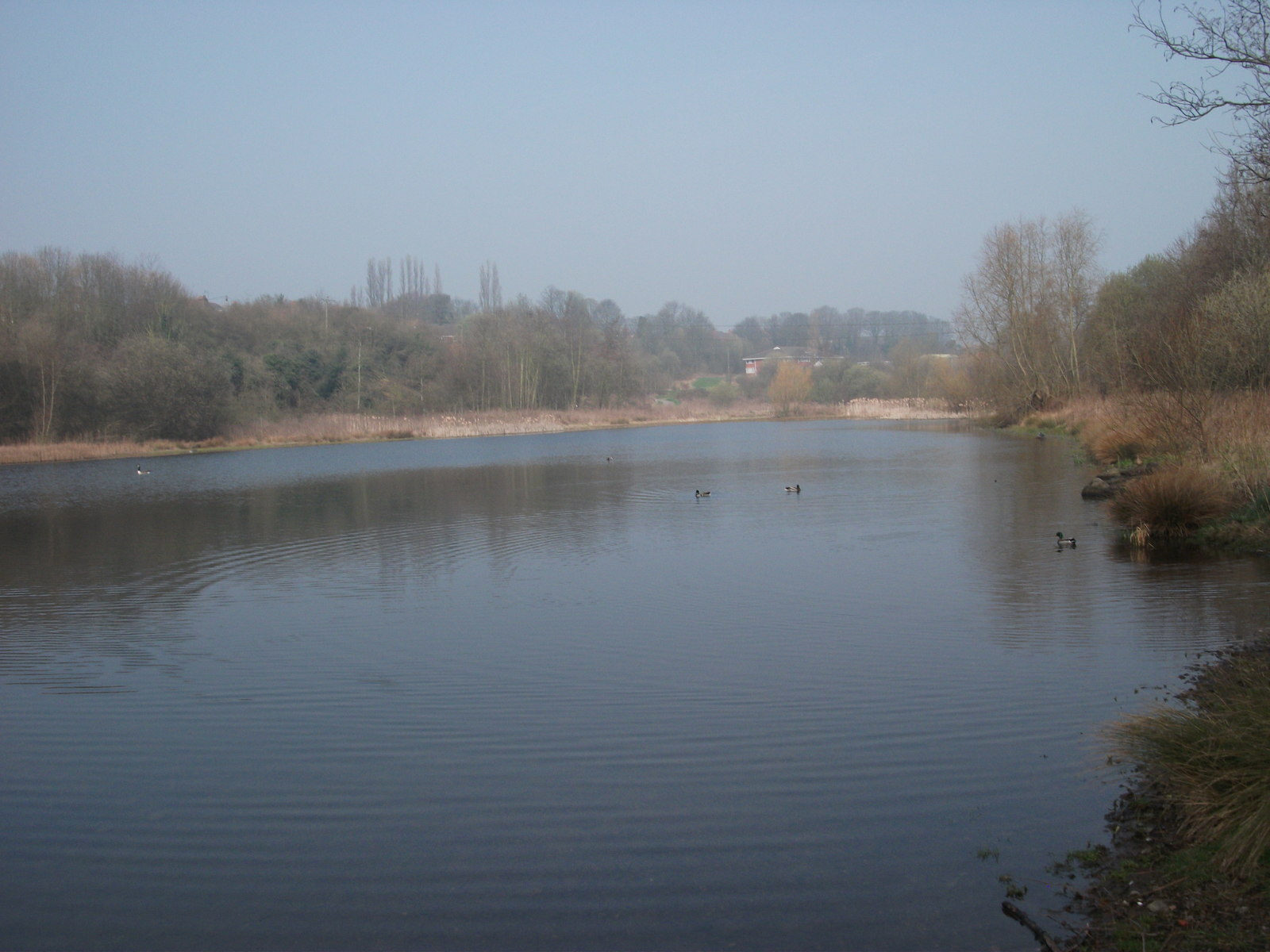
- Old clay pit, now a pond at the park

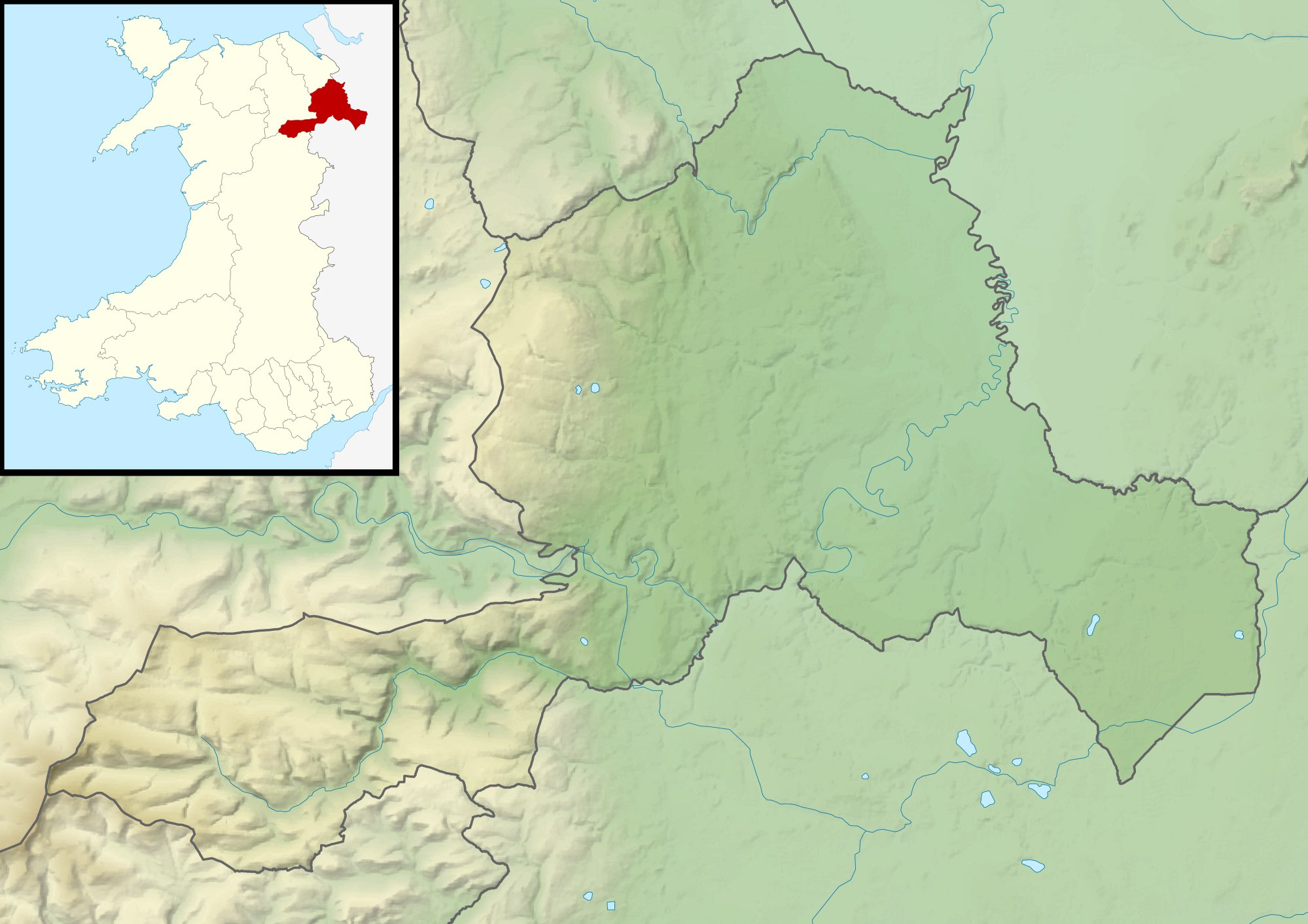
- Location within Wrexham
- Type: Park
- Location: Johnstown and Rhos, Wrexham County Borough, Wales
- OS grid: SJ2979246052
- Coordinates: 53.00687°N 3.04643°W
- Area: 3 hectares (30,000 m^{2}) (nature reserve)
- Manager: Wrexham County Borough Council and Wild Ground (nature reserve section)
- Water: Pond
- Website: www.wrexham.gov.uk/service/parks-and-countryside/stryt-las-park

Stryt Las Park (Welsh: Parc Stryt Las; sometimes spelled Stryd Las (Note: "Street" is usually translated into "Stryd" or "Heol" in modern Welsh. "Stryt" is mainly used by Wrexham County Borough Council.)) is a park situated between Johnstown and Rhosllanerchrugog, in Wrexham County Borough, Wales. It is named after Stryt Las (lit. transl. Blue Street), the street which borders the park to its south. The park is situated on a former colliery and landfill site.

== Description ==
The park lies between Rhosllanerchrugog to its west and Johnstown to its east. It is situated on a former colliery and landfill site. The park contains areas of grasslands and woodlands, but is in a predominately wetland area, with a large pond and three smaller ponds.

Stryt Las has a large pond, formerly an old clay pit. The large pond is drained annually as part of conservation efforts and a general clean up. During the process, the lake bed is extensively cleaned, litter is removed, and fish netted by Natural Resources Wales are relocated to other ponds or lakes in need of restocking. The removal of fish from the pond is necessary to prevent a decline in the great crested newt's population, a rare amphibian present in the park.

In 2021, following a conservation project which created a new "secret garden" with new ponds, the nature conservation charity Wild Ground called on local children to produce artwork to be displayed at the park.

=== Biodiversity ===
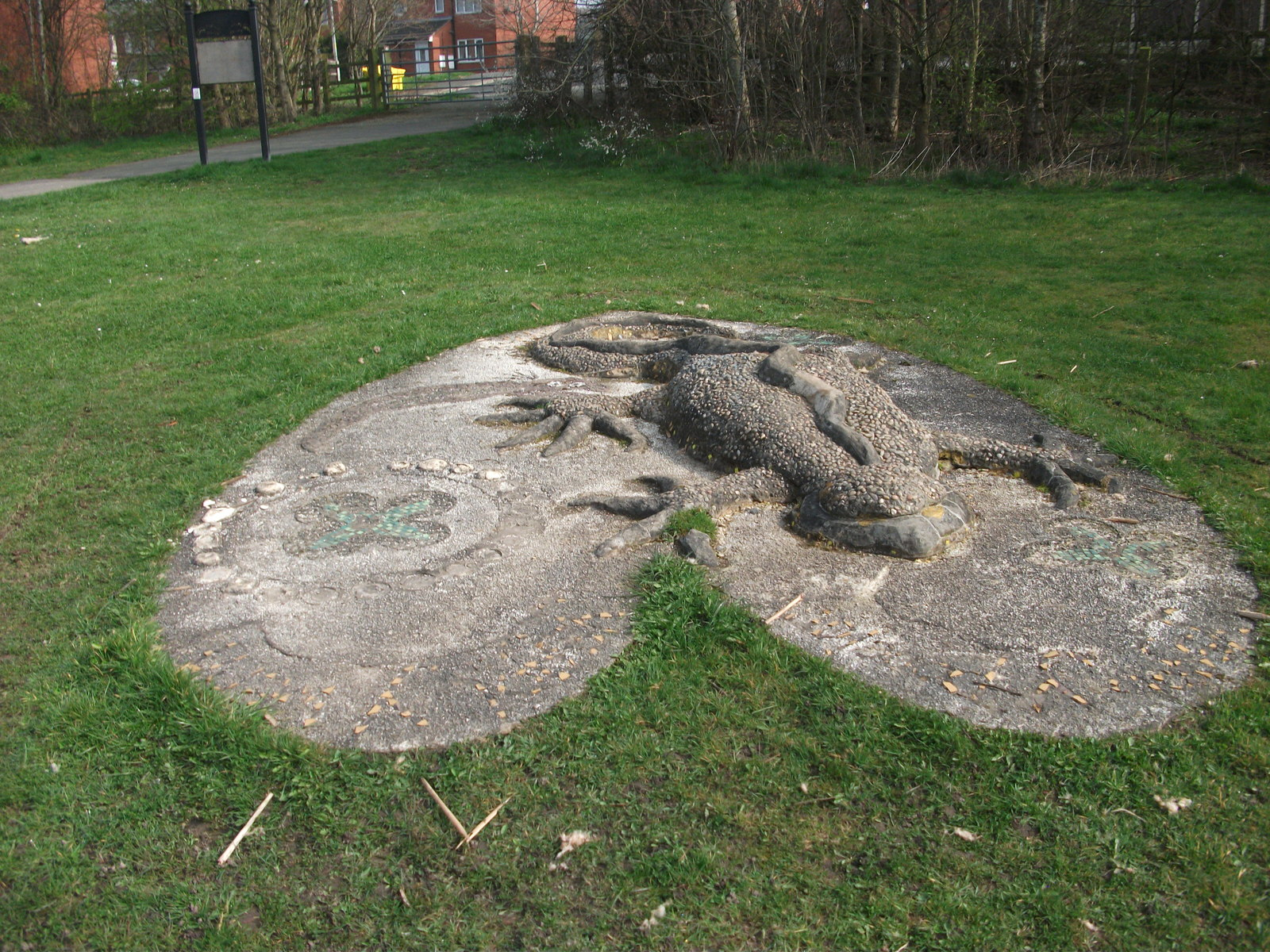
Mosaic Newt in the park

The park is within the Johnstown Special Area of Conservation along with Bonc yr Hafod Country Park, due to the local presence of the rare great crested newts, present at the park's pond. The populations are one of the largest known breeding populations of the great crested newt in Great Britain. Other notable amphibians include: various frogs, toads, smooth newts and palmate newts. Butterflies in the park include: Red Admiral (Vanessa atalanta), Small skipper, Green-veined white and the Comma Butterfly. Whereas birds such as bullfinches, redwings, swallows, house martins, snipes, mute swans, great tits, goldfinches, magpies, chaffinches, and water rails are also present in the park. The park is part of the Stryt Las a'r Hafod Site of Special Scientific Interest (SSSI). A wildfowl population, such as ducks and swans (mute swans), have been recorded in the large pond, with the park also having managing issues with crassula, in particular the invasive species crassula helmsii which can destroy life in the ponds.

== See also ==
- Parks and open spaces in Wrexham
