= Stryt Las a'r Hafod =

Protected area in Clwyd, Wales

Stryt Las a'r Hafod (sometimes spelled Stryd Las a'r Hafod) is a Site of Special Scientific Interest in the preserved county of Clwyd, north Wales, and specifically in Wrexham County Borough. It includes the parks of Bonc yr Hafod and Stryt Las Park.

== See also ==
- List of Sites of Special Scientific Interest in Clwyd
