= Harry Evans (composer) =

Welsh musician (1873–1914)

Harry Evans (1 May 1873 – 23 July 1914) was a Welsh musician, conductor and composer.

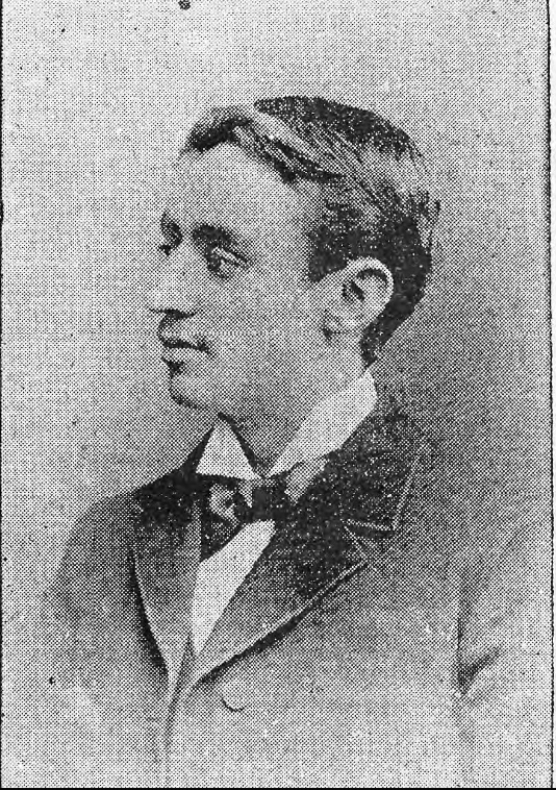
Harry Evans

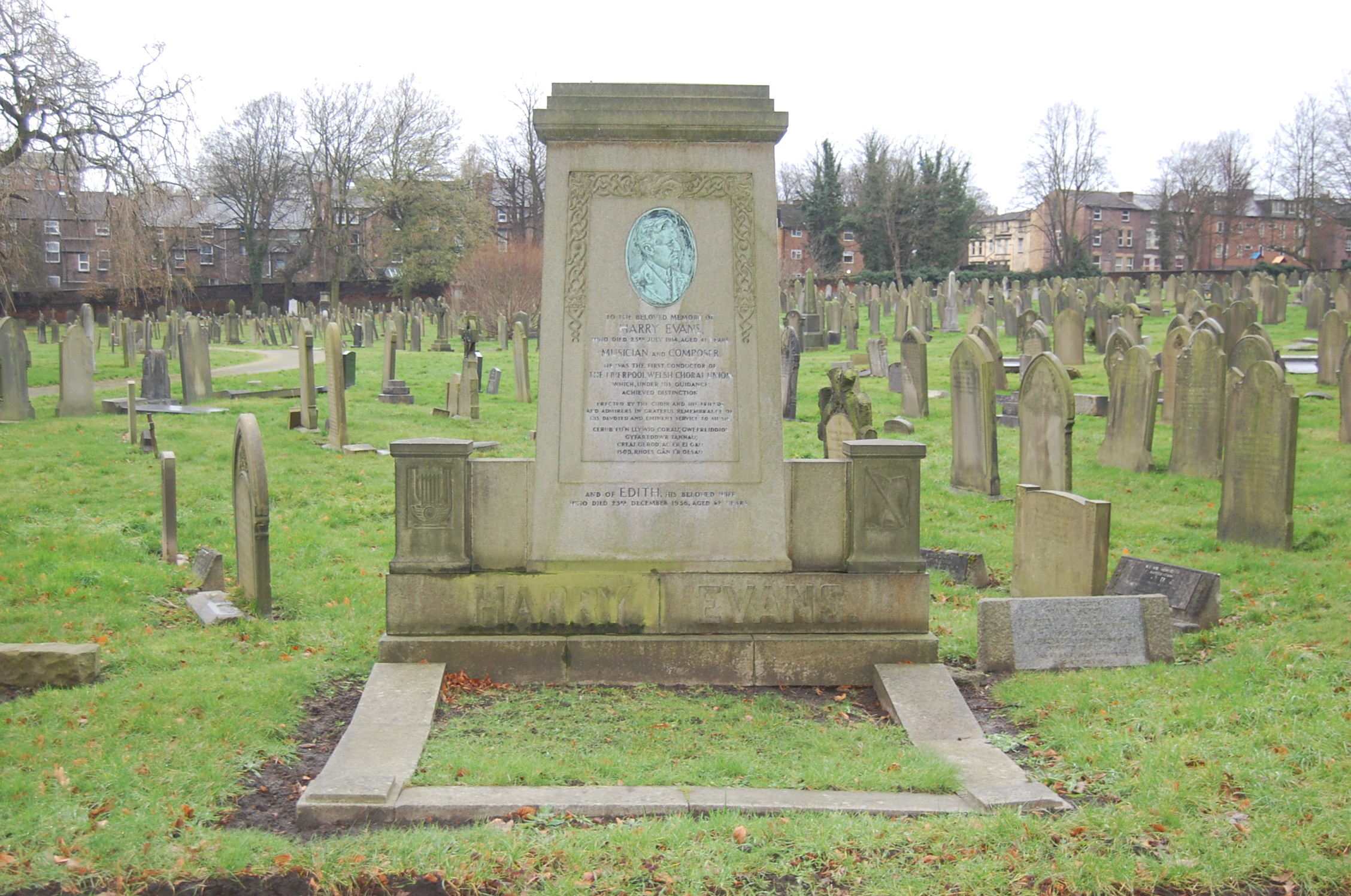
BeddHarriEvans

He was born in Dowlais near Merthyr Tydfil, the son of a local choirmaster, John Evans (Eos Myrddin), and learned music at home, showing such precocious talent that he was appointed organist of Gwernllwyn Congregational Church at the age of nine. The church sponsored his music studies, but family circumstances prevented him proceeding to college, and he had to take a position as a pupil-teacher. In 1893, having suffered serious ill-health, he abandoned teaching for music.

In 1898, Evans formed two choirs in the Merthyr area, one for men and one for women. His male voice choir won first prize at the National Eisteddfod of Wales in 1900, and he was conductor in the following year when the National Eisteddfod was held in Merthyr. After several eisteddfod successes, he became musical director of the Liverpool Welsh Choral Union. In 1913 he became musical director at University of Wales, Bangor, and conducted the Liverpool Philharmonic Society and the North Staffordshire Choral Society. He conducted Granville Bantock's Vanity of Vanities, which was dedicated to Evans by the composer.

After his death, a hymn-tune named In Memoriam was composed by Caradog Roberts in his memory and included in several Welsh hymnaries. He is buried at Toxteth Park Cemetery in Liverpool.

== Works ==
- Dafydd ap Gwilym (1908)
- The Victory of St Garmon
