= South Wales Bible Training Institute =

Defunct Bible college in Porth, Wales

- Type: Bible college
- Active: 1919–1937
- Founders: R. B. Jones
- Religious affiliation: fundamentalist / evangelical
- Location: Porth, Rhondda Cynon Taf, Wales; 51.613°N 3.412°W
- Campus: Tynycymmer Hall, Porth

The South Wales Bible Training Institute was a Bible college in Porth. It was started by R. B. Jones in 1919. Classes were initially held in his church's vestry in Ynyshir, but later moved to Tynycymmer Hall in Porth. It was inspired by American fundamentalist Bible schools, especially Moody Bible Institute. It closed in 1937.

South Wales Bible Training Institute trained men and women in Bible knowledge "for all kinds of Christian work at home and abroad." Densil D. Morgan has called it and the Bible College of Wales "Welsh fundamentalism's two most visible inter-war manifestations".
