= Bonc yr Hafod =

Country park in Wrexham County Borough

Bonc yr Hafod Country Park
- Parc Gwledig Bonc yr Hafod (Welsh)
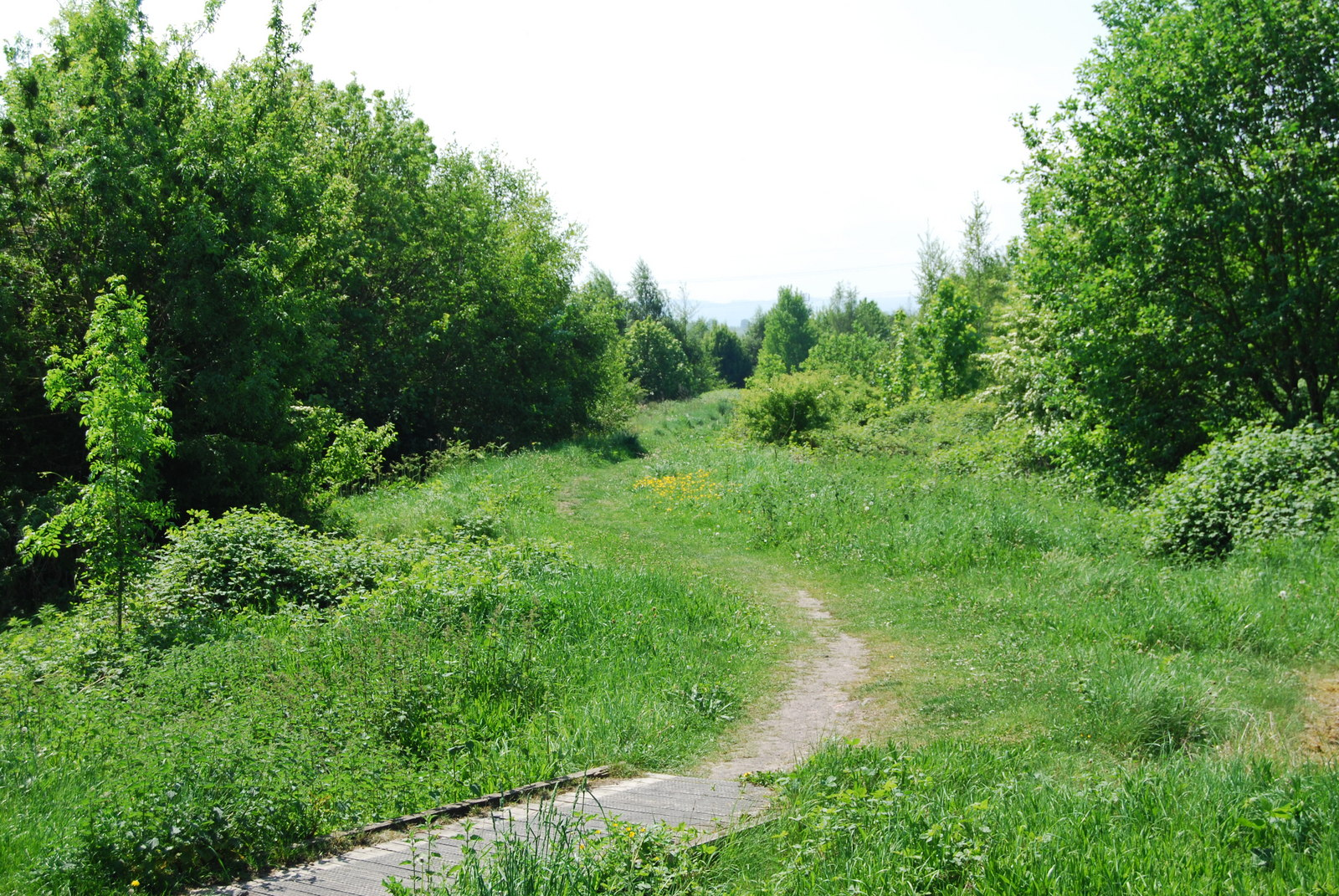
- Pathway in the country park

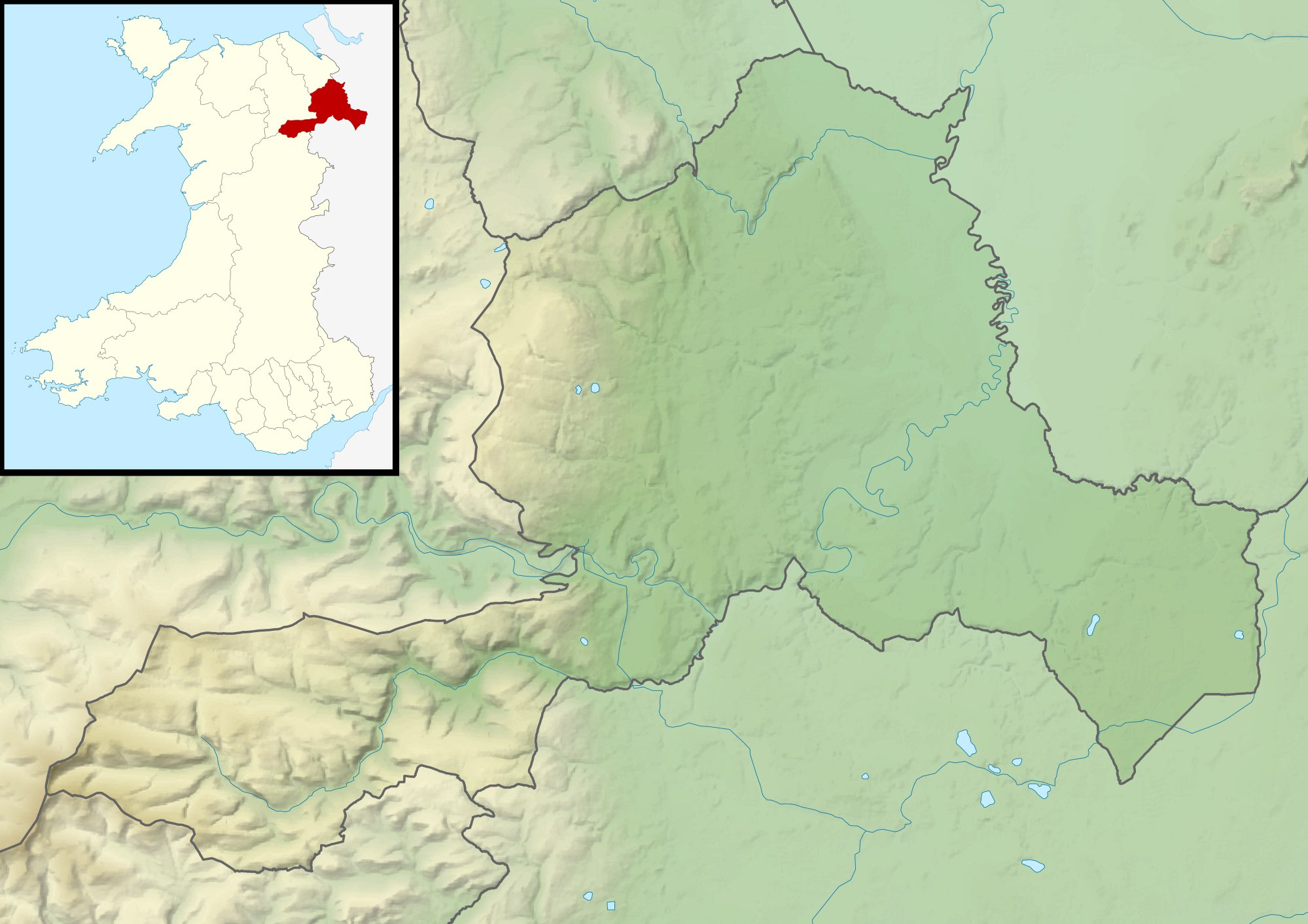
- Location within Wrexham
- Interactive map of Bonc yr Hafod Country Park
- Type: Country park
- Location: Wrexham County Borough, Wales
- Nearest city: Wrexham
- OS grid: SJ310468
- Coordinates: 53.0142°N 3.0287°W
- Area: ~90 acres (0.36 km^{2})
- Established: 1997
- Manager: Wrexham County Borough Council
- Paths: Yes
- Terrain: Hill
- Parking: Yes (Hafod Road)
- Website: www.wrexham.gov.uk/service/parks-and-countryside/bonc-yr-hafod-country-park

Bonc yr Hafod (Welsh for 'Hafod bank') is a country park, on the former site of Hafod Colliery, near Johnstown and Pentre Bychan in Wrexham County Borough, Wales. The country park is centred on a former spoil tip hill, known locally as "Picnic Mountain" (Welsh: Mynydd Picnic), rising up 150 metres (490 ft). The country park is 90 acres (0.36 km^{2}) in size of mainly woodlands and grasslands. The park is home to one of the largest community woodlands in North East Wales.

== Description ==
The country park is situated on the old "Hafod Colliery" site, and is 90 acres (0.36 km^{2}) in size, with mainly woodlands and grasslands. The park is home to one of the largest community woodlands in North East Wales.

Within the park there is a hill, known locally as "Picnic Mountain" (Welsh: Mynydd Picnic), rising up 150 metres (490 ft). The hill is made from the mining waste collected from the various mine shafts and tunnels when the site was operating as a colliery.

=== Biodiversity ===
The park is within the Johnstown Special Area of Conservation along with Stryt Las Park, due to the local presence of the rare Great Crested Newts. Other fauna include: dragonflies, grass snakes, buzzards, kestrels and skylarks. Notable flora is present in the summer, with wildflowers such as the Common Spotted-orchid and Birdsfoot trefoil, whereas in the winter the park is mainly covered in fungi such as the Fly-agaric toadstool. Wildflowers are widely present in the park, due to the soil's low nutrient content as being a former spoil heap. The park is also part of the Stryt Las a'r Hafod Site of Special Scientific Interest (SSSI).

== History ==
The country park was once the site of the Hafod Colliery. A deep mine was first sunk at the site in the 1867, to replace the former Wynnstay Colliery (whose Engine House and Fan House can still be seen on either side of the B5605 to Rhosymedre) after flooding caused it to close in the 1850s, with Hafod being in operation for around 100 years. Coal was the main product extracted from the mine, but natural gas was also piped out of the mine to fire the quarry tile production nearby, often also owned by the operator of the colliery. Many homes of the miners working the colliery were made from the bright red clay extracted from the colliery. The colliery employed over 1900 people from mainly the nearby villages of Rhosllanerchrugog, Ponciau and Johnstown.

To reach the depths of the coal seams, 25 million tons of waste stone and shale were extracted and banked onto a spoil tip, forming the hill at Hafod. The coal later extracted at the site over its 100 years of operation was more than the waste spoil.

The mine contributed to the building of Johnstown and Rhosllanerchrugog, as the coal mine was a main economic and social force for the area.

The colliery pit was closed in 1968. In the 1970s the spoil tip was re-shaped and spread-out as a disaster prevention measure following the Aberfan disaster. The tip's peaks were removed, and the hillsides of the tip were made less steep. During the 1980s, there was coal extraction from the tip by a private company. Terraces were dug into the hillside, and power coal was extracted and burned for electricity. During this extraction, the spoil tip was extended southwards to cover the area where the former colliery buildings once stood.

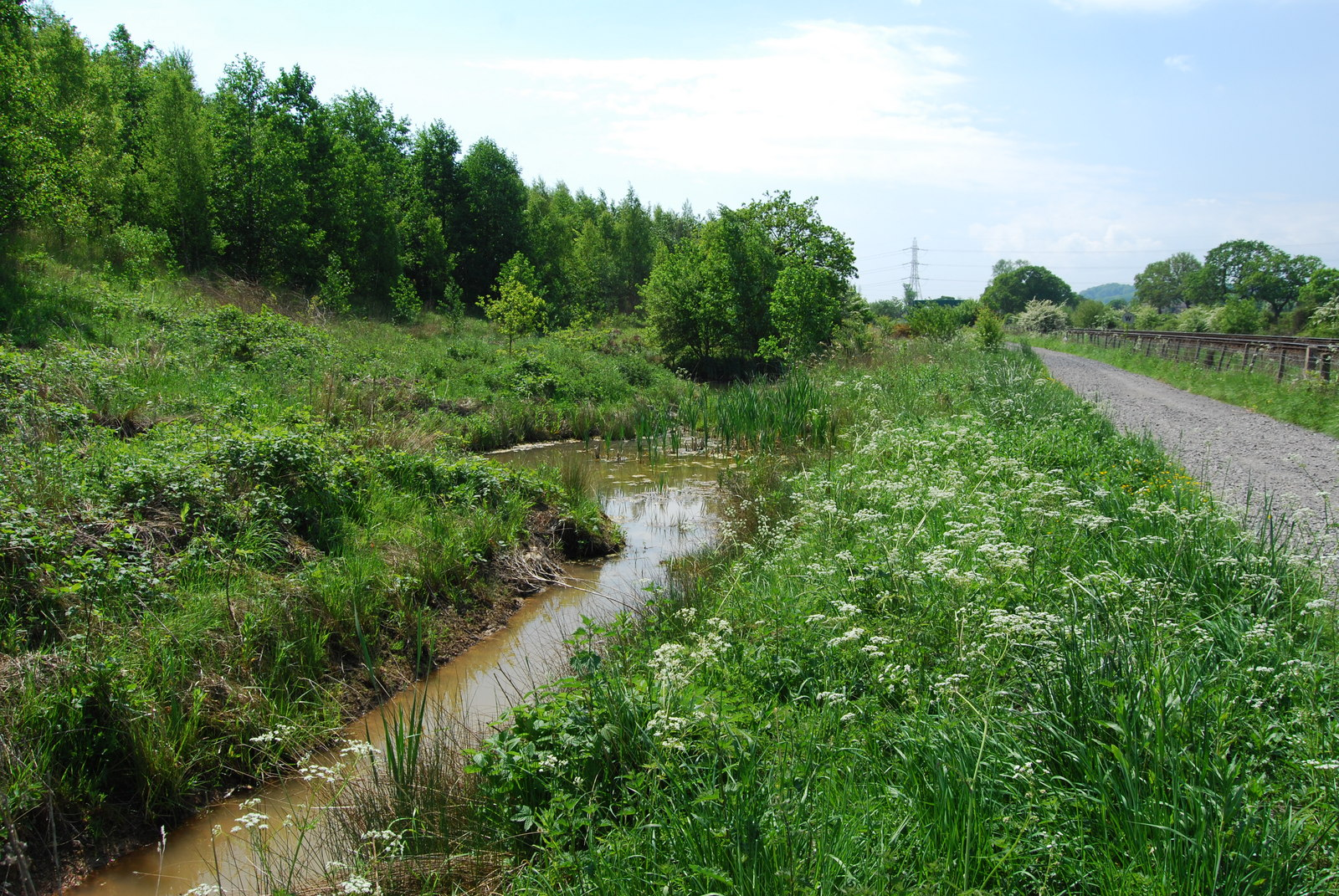
A pond within the park.

In 1991, the Wrexham Maelor Groundwork Trust (now Groundwork North Wales) was established, and in co-operation with Wrexham Maelor Council, they were responsible for landscaping the spoil heap into the Bonc yr Hafod / Hafod Community Woodland following a public consultation into the future of the spoil tip. Over the new few years in the mid-1990s the spoil heap was landscaped and the soil conditions improved to allow for the planting of trees and grow grasslands. To improve the soil, wood residue and dried sewage sludge was added. A stone-armoured drainage network was also built to prevent water scouring the spoil tip in the event of a flash flood. Up to 80,000 trees were planted, covering three quarters of the site, with the remaining sections of the park near its pathway network becoming grassland.

In 1997, the ownership of the park was passed to Wrexham County Borough Council, and managed as a country park.

In 2021, the First Minister of Wales Mark Drakeford announced that two woodlands would be created in Wales to commemorate those lost during the COVID-19 pandemic in Wales. One of the two woodlands, covering a proposed 14 hectares (0.14 km^{2}), is set to be planted adjacent to the country park on its eastern side, between it and the A483 dual carriageway, and within the National Trust Cymru's Erddig estate.

== See also ==
- Parks and open spaces in Wrexham
- Erddig
