= James Sauvage =

American opera singer

James Sauvage in 1877

James Sauvage (born James Savage), (9 May 1849 – 27 November 1922) was a Welsh baritone singer.

== Early life ==
Sauvage grew up in the mining community of Penrhos, Rhosllannerchrugog, Wales, the son of Thomas and Mary Savage of The Square. Before he was nine years old, he began working in one of the local collieries, the Brandie Pit No. 6 at Ruabon, working twelve-hour days. His musical talents appeared at an early age and as a child his voice was highly appreciated in local concerts and eisteddfodau, and he sang alto in the choir at the Calvinistic Methodist Capel Mawr (literally "Big Chapel") in Rhos.

At the age of eighteen, he left to seek work in the coalfields of Ohio in the United States with several other young men from Rhos. A few years later, in the town of Jackson, Ohio, he met Lewis William Lewis (known by his bardic name of 'Llew Llwyfo') of Penysarn, Llanwenllwyfo, Anglesey, Wales. Lewis was touring the Welsh communities of the US with a concert party he had brought over from Wales. Llew Llwyfo managed to persuade James Savage to give up his job in the mines and join the concert party, a decision which changed the course of his life.

== Musical career ==
On returning to Wales, Sauvage began to make a name for himself in the musical world, and was frequently called upon to perform at the National Eisteddfod. He later gained a place at the Royal Academy of Music, London, England and in two years, the shortest time in record there for a student, won the bronze, silver, and gold medals. He was later elected associate of the institution and soon after became a Fellow of the Royal Academy.

Although he started his singing career as a tenor he later developed as a world-famous baritone. He was widely known as an operatic singer, and for a number of years was a member of the Carl Rosa Opera Company, and his repertoire included the standard English, French and Italian works.

Sauvage continued to make regular visits to the United States and eventually the family settled there in Lincoln Park, Newark, New Jersey. James took up the position of Director of Music at the Peddie Memorial Church in Newark and later was appointed Professor of Singing at Vassar College in New York. James Sauvage eventually became a naturalised United States citizen.

Every summer James made an annual 'pilgrimage' back to Rhosllannerchrugog, travelling in some style between New York and Liverpool on the best of the Cunard Line liners. He made his last visit to Rhos in the summer of 1922.

== Death and legacy ==
Professor James Sauvage died in November 1922 at Newark, New Jersey at the age of 73. David Lloyd George, the former British Prime Minister, wrote of James Sauvage:

About thirty five year ago he was the principal vocalist in the Criccieth Eisteddfod. After having charmed the thousands who came to listen to him from the hills and valleys, he came home with me for a cup of tea. When he learned that my mother could not attend the eisteddfod, owing to ill health, he sang to her all of his programme of songs and encores, with the same vigour and enthusiasm that he displayed in singing to the thousands. What pleasure this gave to my dear old mother! Ever since there has been a warm spot in my heart for the famous musician.

== Personal life ==
James Savage married Eleanor Lewis, the daughter of his mentor Llew Llwyfo, on 11 December 1871 at St. Louis, Missouri. They had six children. Their first child Lillian was born in St. Louis in 1872. Their second child Thomas (always to be known as 'Tonzo') was born in Rhyl, Wales in 1874 and in 1898 married Elsie Peddie in Newark, New Jersey, the daughter of Republican politician Thomas Baldwin Peddie. Their third child, Vilda, was born in Aberystwyth, Wales in 1875 while James was studying at Aberystwyth University. James and Eleanor's fourth child, Mary Blodwen, was born in Fulham, London, England in 1877. They had two more children, Louis Idris born in Hammersmith, London, England in 1885 and James Elwyn born in 1890 in Newark, New Jersey.

== Sources ==
- Obituary of James Sauvage, "Rhos Herald", Rhosllannerchrog, Wales, 1922
- Obituary of James Sauvage, "Newark Call", Newark, New Jersey, USA, 1922
- Ellis Island Records
- UK Census Records
- USA Census Records
- Missouri Marriage Records, 1805-2002 at Ancestry.com
