= Parks and open spaces in Wrexham =

The city of Wrexham has two main city parks: Bellevue Park and Acton Park. On the outskirts of the city, there is also open parkland on and surrounding the Erddig estate. There is also a city centre green and various smaller parks and open spaces.

A total of 13 parks and green spaces in Wrexham city have been – or are in the process of being – legally protected by the green space charity Fields in Trust, ensuring that they can never be built on or lost to development. A further 24 parks and open spaces have also been awarded such protection in the wider Wrexham County Borough.

== Parks ==
=== Bellevue Park ===
Bellevue Park (Parciau; 53.0434°N 2.9997°W) – opened in 1910. It is located to the south-east of Wrexham city centre in Offa. It hosts a Queen Victoria statue originally from Gulidhall Square on Chester Street, and a bandstand pavilion opened in 1915. The park has hosted the National Eisteddfod of Wales twice in 1912 and 1933. The park was neglected during the 1970s, and many of the amenities were in a poor state of repair. A major project was undertaken to refurbish the Park back to its original splendour. This was funded by the Heritage Lottery Fund, Urban Parks Project, Welsh Development Agency, and the European Regional Development Fund. The park reopened in its restored original Edwardian condition in June 2000. It now boasts children's play areas, a bowling green constructed in 1914 which is home to the Parciau Bowling Club, tennis, and basketball courts and an original Edwardian bandstand set in an amphitheatre. In the summer months social events take place in the park, such as music concerts, and children's outdoor activity events.

=== Acton Park ===
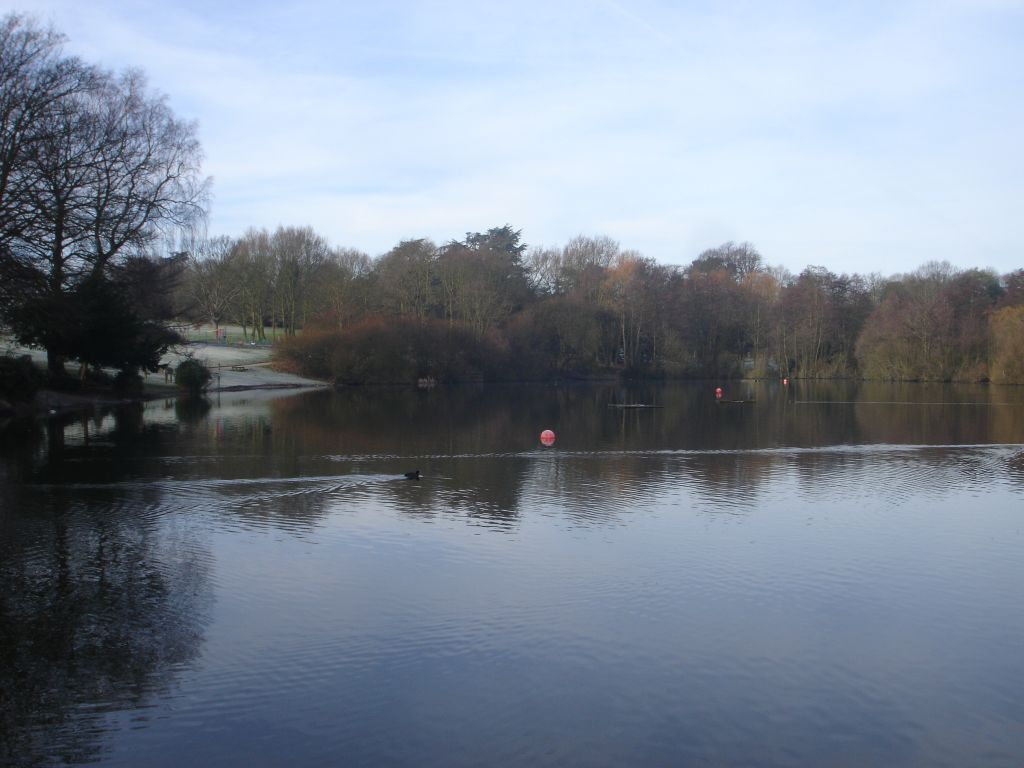
The lake at Acton Park

Acton Park (53.0616°N 2.9795°W) is 0.5 miles (0.8 km) north of Wrexham city centre, between the communities of Acton and Borras Park and the suburb of Garden Village. The site of the park was originally the landscaped grounds of Acton Hall, created in the 1790s. The grounds and hall were transferred to Wrexham Municipal Borough Council in 1947, with the hall demolished in 1954. The park covers approximately 64 acres (26 ha).

Acton Park features a bowling green, tennis courts, a children's play area, a Japanese-style garden and a large lake which has attracted diverse wildlife. The general layout of the park has remained unchanged since it was laid out in the 18th century and now boasts many mature trees. The park also is home to Gorsedd stones, originally constructed for the National Eisteddfod in Bellevue Park, until they were moved to Acton Park.

== Open spaces and smaller parks ==
=== Llwyn Isaf ===
Llwyn Isaf (53.0477°N 2.9932°W), – which is situated alongside Wrexham Guildhall, is a popular green area within the city centre. The green was originally the landscaped grounds of a mansion house of the same name. It now lies at the centre of Wrexham's civic centre just off Queens Square and near Wrexham Library, with it sometimes known as "Library Field". The Welsh Children in Need concert was held at this location in 2005. Council-sponsored events such as Christmas fairs and the Wrexham Food and Drink Festival (Wrexham Feast) are held on the site. The green hosts a bandstand.

=== Dean Road Field ===
Dean Road Field is a playing field in Rhosnesni, located off Dean Road and Holt Road. The council considered changing the status of the field into a "town or village green". Proposals to construct housing on the site have faced local opposition.

=== Nine Acre Field ===
Nine Acre Field (sometimes partly Welsh: Cae Nine Acre) is an open space in Wrexham. In September 2022, the council proposed it become the Queen Elizabeth II Park, following her death a few weeks prior, in which the council would also protect the site as a permanent green space. In June 2023, it was announced the site would be re-opening for public use. It was also utilised by pupils from the former Grove Park School.

=== Morgan Llwyd Memorial Park ===
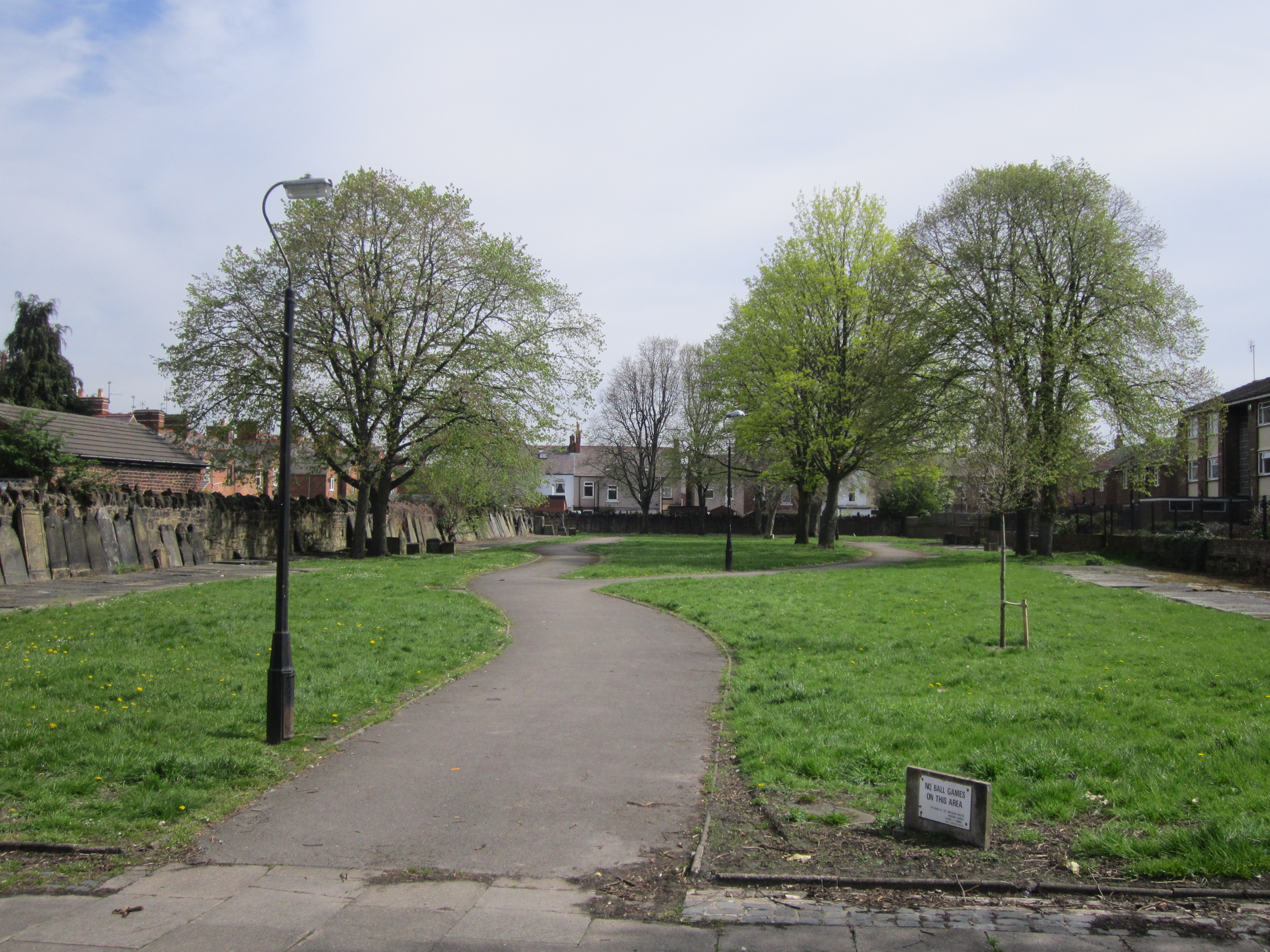
Looking towards the graveyard.

The Morgan Llwyd Memorial Park, also formerly known as the Dissenters' Burial Ground, (or the Dissenters' Graveyard or The Bun Hill Fields of North Eastern Wales), is a former nonconformist graveyard in Rhosddu, Wrexham.

The site was originally a quillet ("small tract of land"), possibly the field called Talar-y-geifr, that was part of the Wrexham Regis "common fields" (an open-field system on common land) and was used as a burial ground for two centuries by Wrexham Dissenters, also termed nonconformists.

The Royal Commission on the Ancient and Historical Monuments of Wales and Monmouthshire used the term "Dissenter's Graveyard" and compared it as the Bunhill Fields of Wrexham. In 1655, the site appeared in the will of Daniel Lloyd, the possible original donor of the land, which Lloyd allocated for a "new churchyard", and the site covered 2 1/2 roods (0.625 acres (2,530 m^{2})). The site was acquired around 1655, during the Commonwealth of England and Interregnum, by a congregation under Morgan Llwyd O Wynedd, who was later buried on the site in June 1659.

After Llwyd's death, the congregation's successors from Chester Street Baptist Church later managed the burial ground. The last record of the site belonging to the Dissenters was in 1697. Although by 1779, the successors could not locate the papers proving the transfer, nevertheless it was not doubted that they had full ownership rights by the start of the 18th century. Other dissenter groups were also allowed to be buried on the site. In 1820, it was claimed there was a gravestone on the grounds engraved with "1656" as the date; although later surveys could not locate the stone to verify it, there was no suspicion that the original claim was a mistake.

On one night in 1848, the brasses on almost all the ground's tombstones (except one) were vandalised and destroyed, as their brasses were removed, which was possibly linked to Wrexham races that night. There are no full burial records of the site.

In 1857, the perimeter hedge around the graveyard was replaced with a wall, while in 1883 part of it was given up to allow the widening of Rhosddu Road.

The ground was officially closed in 1888 by an order of the council, although some later burials were permitted, with the last occurring in 1901. In April 1912, a memorial to Morgan Llwyd was unveiled at the graveyard's entrance by Margaret Lloyd George. In 1960, the ground was acquired by Wrexham Borough Council, and laid out to be a park for the wider use of the borough. The grounds reopened on 1 May 1963 as the "Morgan Llwyd Memorial Park". It is now regarded as a public park.

=== Rhosddu Park ===
Located opposite the memorial park, on the other side of Rhosddu Road, is Rhosddu Park. It was noted to potentially be the first park in the UK, alongside the opposite former cemetery, to put up signs discouraging human defecation, alongside other notices to discourage anti-social behaviour. In Summer 2019, a community event fair "fun day" was held in the park. It is also known as the “Rhosddu Recreation Ground”. It was created through the generosity of owners of the Island Green Brewery, William and John Jones. Some consider it as Wrexham’s first public park.

=== Other protected fields ===
There are other protected open spaces across Wrexham, including open spaces at Anthony Eden Drive, Rosewood Avenue, Wyndham Gardens, and Tanycoed. Recreation grounds at Queen's Park (Caia Park), playing fields and play areas at Brickfield (Court Road, Erddig Road), Ashfield (next to Wrexham Tennis Centre), and Coed Aben. As well as Owain Glyndwr Fields at Maesgwyn, Rhosnesni (the Rhosnesni playing fields, colloquially Spider Park) and Tanydre. All protected by Fields in Trust and managed by Wrexham council.

=== Other minor open spaces ===
There is also a green in Garden Village.

== Open parkland ==
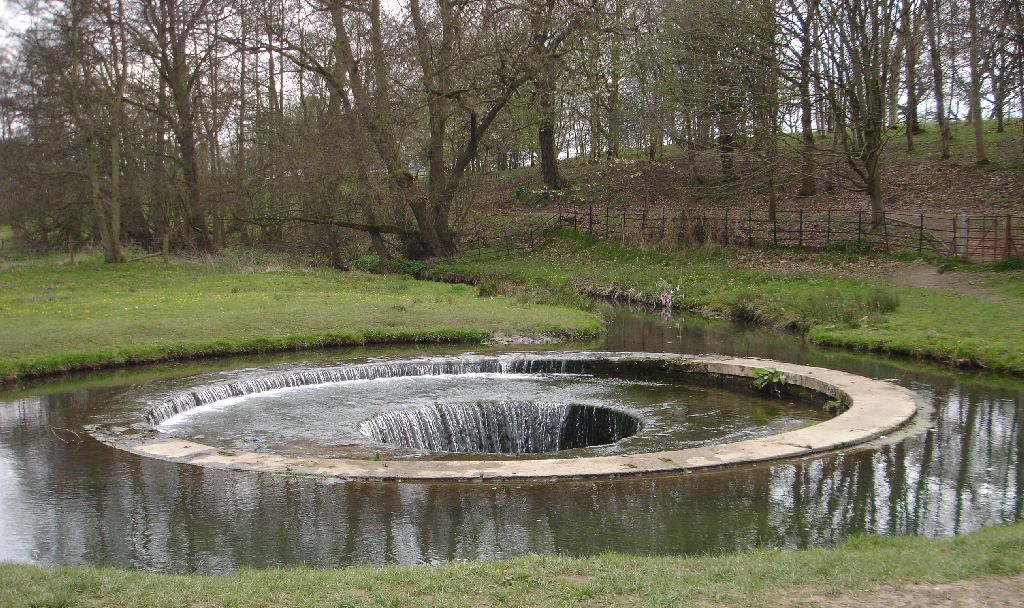
The 'Cup and Saucer' at Erddig Park

Erddig Park (53.0306°N 3.0027°W) is two miles (3 km) south of the city centre, where the city meets the Clywedog Valley. The park is owned and managed by the National Trust, and is home to Erddig Hall and its formal gardens. The park is also home to a number of notable historic features. These include a hydraulic ram known as the "Cup and Saucer", which is used to pump water from the park to Erddig Hall, and the remains of Wristleham motte and bailey which is thought to be the beginnings of Wrexham as a city in the 12th century.

== Allotments ==
There are three allotments in the city of Wrexham, and an additional one in Tanyfron, in the wider county borough. The three within Wrexham city are located on Erddig Road, Victoria Road, and Prices Lane.

== Nearby country parks ==
There are seven parks and country parks on the outskirts of Wrexham, in the wider Wrexham County Borough, at Tŷ Mawr (Cefn Mawr), Alyn Waters (Gwersyllt), Minera Leadmines (Minera), Bonc-yr-Hafod (Hafod), Moss Valley (Moss), Nant Mill (River Clywedog trail) and Stryt Las (Johnstown); as well as two other country houses at Brynkinalt and Iscoyd Park.

== See also ==
- Wrexham Cemetery – Described as Wrexham's first park when it opened
