= Caradog Roberts =

Welsh musician

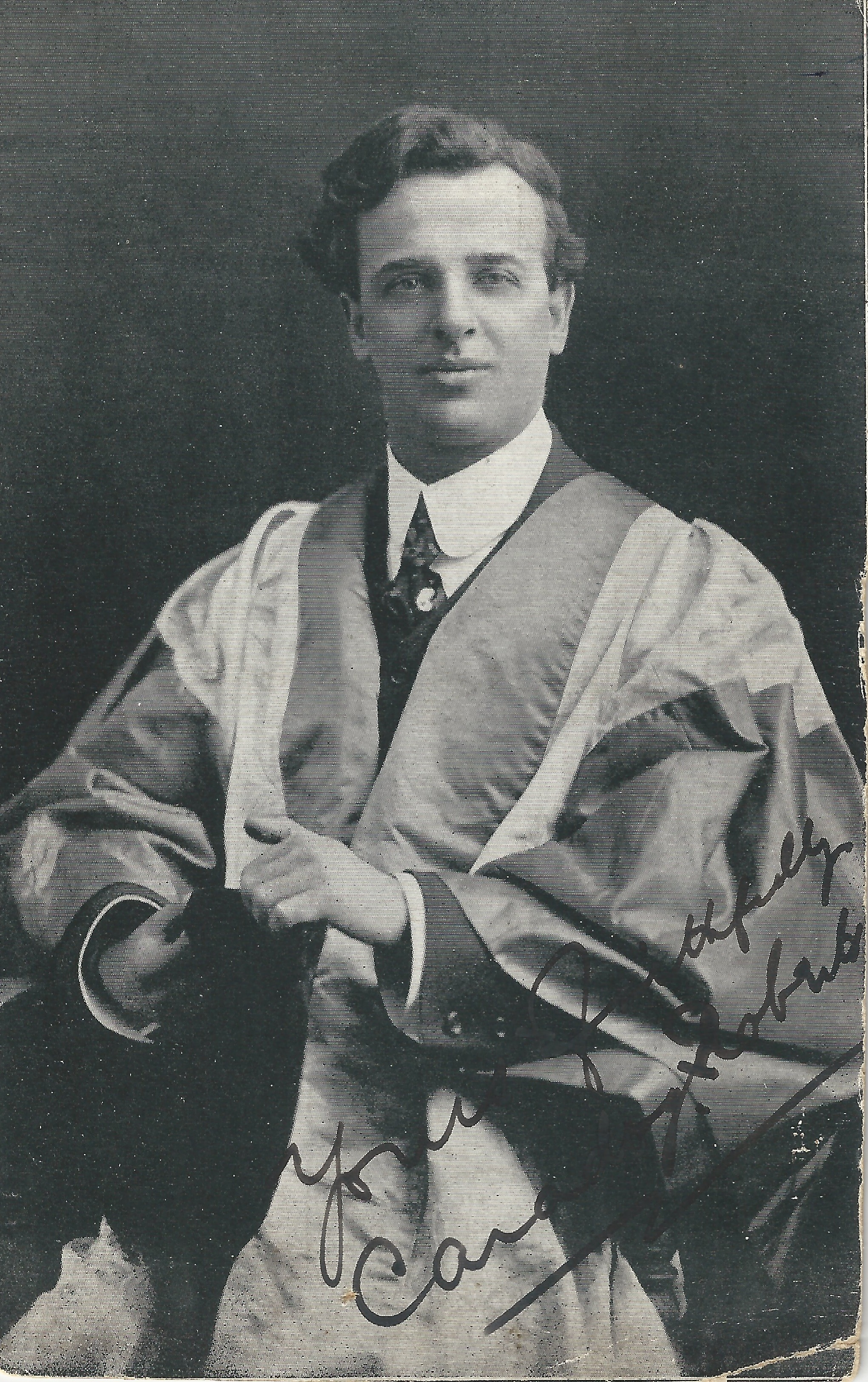
Caradog Roberts (1915)

Caradog Roberts (30 October 1878 — 3 March 1935) was a Welsh composer, organist and choirmaster.

Roberts was born in Rhosllannerchrugog to John and Margaret Roberts. He showed musical talent since his childhood, winning several prizes at Welsh festivals (eisteddfodau) in which he participated.

He studied piano and organ, becoming organist of Mynydd Seion Congregational church, Ponciau from 1894 until 1903. In the next year he took the same position at Bethlehem Congregational church, Rhosllanerchrugog, a post he retained until his death. He took the degrees of B.Mus. (1906) and D.Mus. (1911), both at Oxford University. From 1914 to 1920, he was Director of Music at Bangor University.

Roberts was one of the editors of Y Caniedydd Cynulleidfaol Newydd (1921), the hymnal of the Welsh Independent Church, as well as Caniedydd Newydd yr Ysgol Sul (1930), the Sunday School hymnal of that same church.

Roberts was a prolific composer and arranger of hymn tunes, several of which were incorporated into Welsh hymnaries. Among the most well-known are Rachie and In Memoriam, a tribute to Welsh composer Harry Evans.

He died in Wrexham, Denbighshire, on 3 March 1935, and is buried in Rhosllannerchrugog cemetery.
