= R. B. Jones =

Welsh evangelical preacher

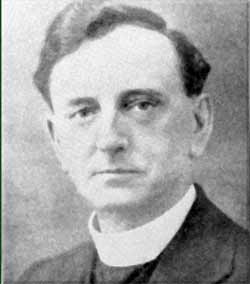
R. B. Jones

Rhys Bevan Jones (19 September 1869 – 10 April 1933) was a Welsh evangelical preacher. He was the founding principal of the South Wales Bible Training Institute.

Jones was born in Dowlais, attended Pontypool Baptist College, and was ordained in 1893. He was involved in the 1904–1905 Welsh revival, and brought it to Rhosllanerchrugog. D. Densil Morgan and David Ceri Jones note that Jones' "reputation as a stern prophet of the divine wrath" was consolidated during the revival.

David W. Bebbington suggests that Jones was the "chief exponent of Keswick teaching in Wales," and notes that he experienced "total consecration" under the guidance of F. B. Meyer in 1904. Jones most likely also wrote the first Welsh language book on premillennialism.
