= Daniel Lloyd (actor and musician) =

Welsh actor and singer-songwriter

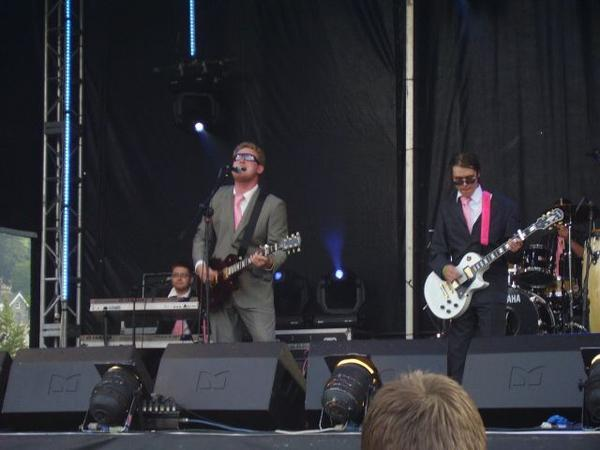
- Daniel Lloyd on stage with Mr Pinc
- Born: 26 July 1982 (age 44); Rhosllannerchrugog, North Wales
- Occupations: Actor, singer-songwriter
- Years active: 2004–present
- Spouse: Elen
- Website: http://www.myspace.com/officialdaniellloyd

Daniel Owain Lloyd (born 26 July 1982, Rhosllannerchrugog, Wales) is a bilingual Welsh actor and singer-songwriter. He is the frontman for the Welsh language band Daniel Lloyd a Mr Pinc, who reformed in 2017 after a 6-year break, as well as a solo artist and established actor.

== Biography ==
His acting credits include four rock and roll pantomimes at Clwyd Theatr Cymru as well Mickey in Tipyn o Stad and Dafydd Meirion in A470 for ITV Wales.

Lloyd's music career has seen him release two albums, Goleuadau Llundain (2005) with Mr Pinc, which reached number 4 in Radio Cymru's Welsh Language Music Chart, and Tro Ar Fyd (2009) as a solo artist, which reached number 3 in the same listings.

He has also appeared as Blondel/Will Scarlet in Robin Hood and the Babes in the Wood at Clwyd Theatr, Cymru.

He currently lives in Denbigh with his speech therapist girlfriend Elen. He announced he had got engaged to Elen during a holiday to Rome on Uned 5 on 7 February 2010. It was announced in an interview with Lisa Gwilym on her programme on the C2 strand of BBC Radio Cymru on 23 February 2011 that he was recently married to Elen.

He appeared as Deri in Gluscabi on a tour to schools and venues in South Wales, for Theatr na n'Og, up to June 2010 and as Storyteller/Emperor and Hans the Potwasher in Aladdin at Clwyd Theatr, Cymru, from November 2010 until January 2011.

He appeared in the roles of Georg and Rupert in Theatr Genedlaethol Cymru (the Welsh language national theatre) production of Spring Awakening, which is called Deffro'r Gwanwyn, from March–April 2011. After Deffro'r Gwanwyn he appeared in Clwyd Theatr Cymru's production of The Taming of the Shrew as the Tailor and various other characters. He appeared in The Comedy of Errors at Stafford Castle as Balthasar and various other characters and also as Moses in Animal Farm at Clwyd Theatr Cymru.

In August 2011 he played two gigs as part of the National Eisteddfod in Wrexham with his band Mr Pinc. After these gigs, the band took a break until 2018, allowing Dan to pursue his own solo project, but the band came back together by popular demand, and performed a series of gigs and released new material.

He appeared as King Camelot in Sleeping Beauty – The Rock and Roll Panto, at Clwyd Theatr Cymru. This will be his final appearance in panto at Clwyd as he has appeared in all seven of Peter Rowe's pantos over consecutive years.

He appeared in Mods and Rox at New Wolsey Theatre, Ipswich as Stevo and then in Clwyd Theatr Cymru's rock and roll panto Dick Whittington as Alderman Fitzwarren.

He filmed a role for the 2014 Muppets movie Muppets Most Wanted at Pinewood Studios in London, and then went into a UK tour of Some Like It Hotter as Jack Lemmon.

He then returned to Clwyd Theatr Cymru for the Rock and roll panto Beauty and the Beast where he played Sir Peacock Beauregarde. He is currently appearing as Mickey Gee in Theatr na nOg's production of Tom: A Story of Tom Jones.

In 2019, he began appearing in the S4C soap opera, Rownd a Rownd, as bar manager Aled Campbell.

Lloyd went on to appear in the Sky comedy drama Brassic, and completed a year long West End run of Roddy Doyle's The Commitments at the Palace Theatre, directed by Jamie Lloyd, in which he played the lead role of Deco alongside covering several other parts. In 2023, he was appointed Interim Associate Director at Theatr Clwyd, contributing to the artistic direction of its rock and roll pantomimes including Robin Hood (2022) and directing Sleeping Beauty (2023). His other directing credits at the venue include the Welsh language productions Hafan, Cytserau, and Wrecslam!, as well as Arandora Star and Far From The Madding Crowd for Theatr na nÓg. As of 2025, he continues to play Aled Campbell in Rownd a Rownd and remains a resident artist with Theatr Clwyd.
