= Rachie =

Welsh hymn tune

"Rachie"
"Rachie" played by Professor Colin Baker on a church organ

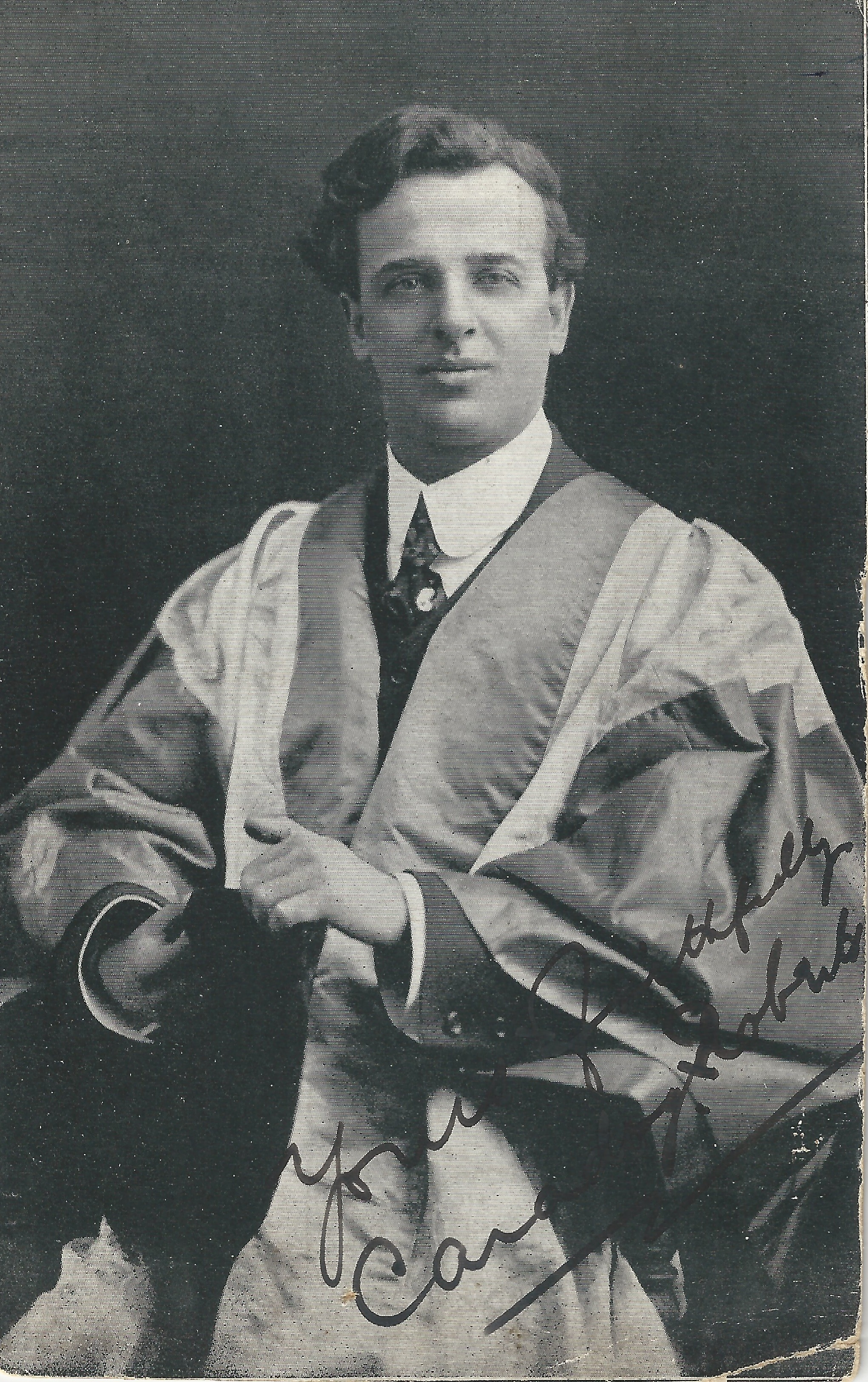
Dr Caradog Roberts

The first few bars as sung by Cantorion Cynwrig

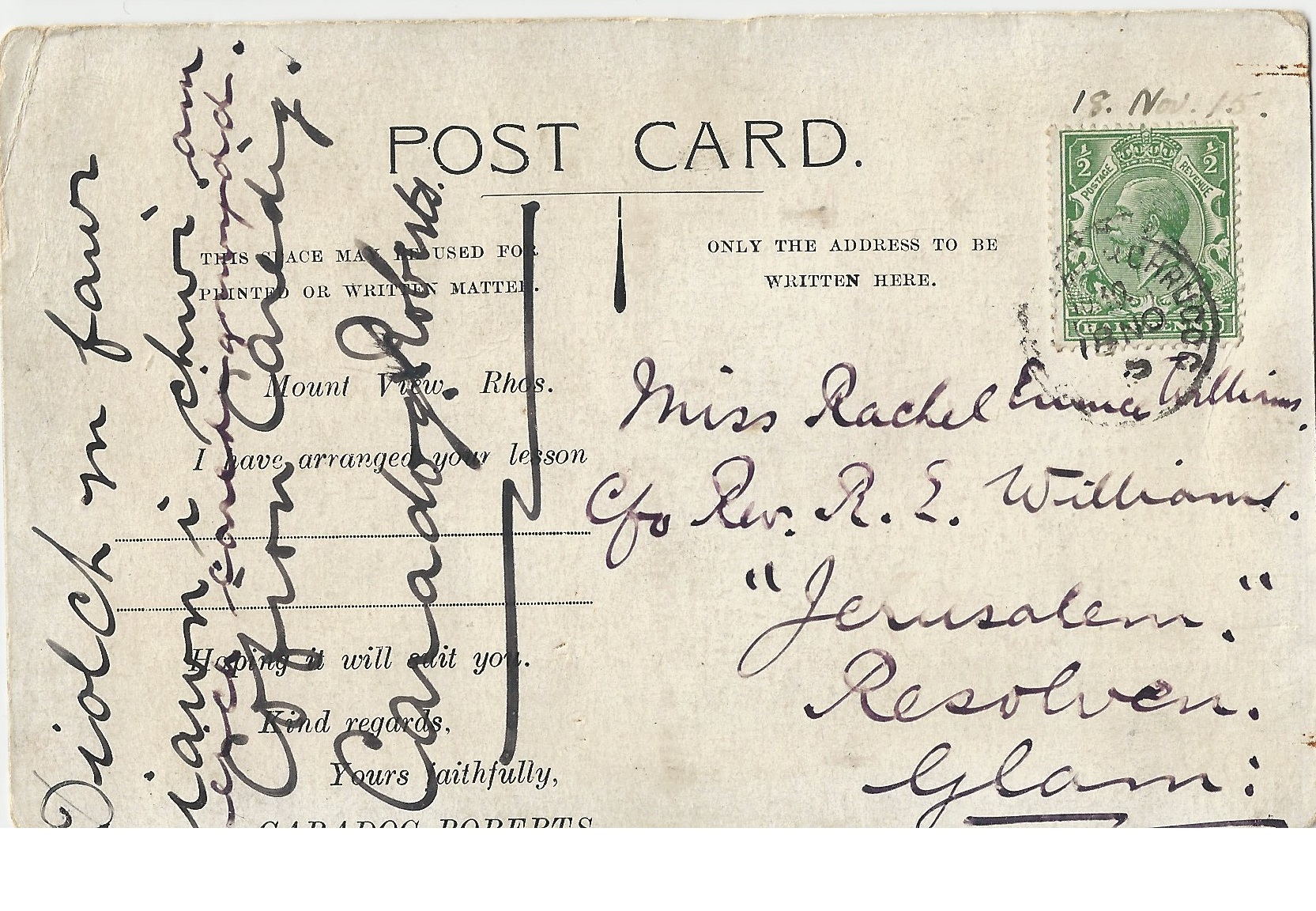
Postcard from Dr Caradog Roberts to Miss Rachel Emma Williams dated 18 November 15 (i.e. 1915), two years before the tune was first sung. The message reads: Diolch yn fawr iawn i chwi am eich caredigrwydd. Cofion Caredig. Caradog Roberts. (Translation: "Thank you very much for your kindness. Kindest wishes. Caredig Roberts."). The picture of Caradog Roberts (as above) is on the reverse of this postcard.

Rachie, frequently sung to the hymn I Bob Un Sydd Ffyddlon (English: "To All Who Are Faithful"), is a Welsh hymn tune. The music was composed by Caradog Roberts, with lyrics by Henry Lloyd, who is better known by his bardic name Ap Hefin. The lyrics are a call to battle, as can be seen with the English translation.

== Composer ==
The composer of the tune was Dr Caradog Roberts (1878–1935) who was born in Rhosllanerchrugog, near Wrexham. The tune was named after Rachel Williams, later Jenkins, of Resolven, near Neath. Composed during the First World War, Roberts said of his tune:

The committee of the Resolven Music Festival requested me to write a new tune for the festival. I went at it straight away and wrote two tunes the same morning. I rejected tune No.1 and sent No.2. The following year the same committee sent me a similar request for a new tune and said how much they had enjoyed the tune I had sent them the previous year... I was extremely busy then and had no time to compose, so I looked up some old mss. [manuscripts] of mine and found "Rachie", the tune I had rejected the previous year. I sent it simply to oblige the friends at Resolven. "Rachie", notwithstanding the fact that it had been turned down by me, turned out to be the most popular of my tunes. It is named after the daughter – then a child – of the pastor of the Congregational Church at Resolven and is pronounced ‘Ray-chee’, which is short for ‘Rachel’.

== Name ==
The name of the tune derives from a visit, on 7 April 1918, by Caradog Roberts to Resolven, to conduct a Cymanfa Ganu (a Welsh hymn singing festival) at the Jerusalem Chapel, which could seat 970 people. Roberts was hosted by the minister of the chapel, Reverend Robert Enoch Williams, whose tenure at the chapel extended from 1902 to 1934. His daughter was popularly known as Rachie, although christened Rachel.

Dr Caradog Roberts introduced his new tune to the Cymanfa Ganu in Jerusalem Chapel. Subsequently, he wrote to the Reverend Williams and asked if he could name the tune after the minister’s 12-year-old daughter Rachie. Her father agreed. (Note: This derives from two interviews with Menna Leyson, the niece of Rachel Jenkins (née Williams), by Professor Colin Baker on 22 April and 20 May 2013. During the interviews, Menna Leyson shared the correspondence that Rachel Jenkins had bequeathed her, including Rachel's notebook containing paper clippings regarding the tune. Menna Leyshon gave permission in that interview for the three pictures above to be made publicly available. Menna Leyson is the current owner of Rachel Jenkins' archives. Menna also became a professional accompanist of the highest repute, not least to Rachie.) (Note: Further evidence of the origins of the hymn tune derives from a church service in 1982 when a major contributor to this article was present. In 1982, when Professor Colin Baker was an organist at St James' Church in Upper Bangor, Gwynedd, Rachie herself came to a service, along with her sister-in-law (Morwen) and her niece, Menna Leyshon. Reverend Roberts announced the hymn Who is on the Lord's side? and that the tune would be "Rachie". He then explained to the congregation that this would be a special moment as Rachie was present in the congregation, along with her sister-in-law and Menna Leyson (who herself was an organist of that church and a much loved accompanist in Wales).)

== Publication and usage ==
"Rachie" was first published in 1921 in a Welsh Independents (Congregationalist) hymn book Y Caniedydd Cynulleidfaol Newydd (English: "The New Congregational Singer"), which was co-edited by Roberts. The words sung in Welsh to "Rachie" are typically "I Bob Un Sydd Ffyddlon" (English: "To All Who Are Faithful"), and were written by Henry Lloyd (1870-1946), who is better known by his bardic name Ap Hefin. The lyrics are a call to battle, this can also be seen in the English translation. The words express a similar call to arms as does the hymn "Onward, Christian Soldiers".

In 1931, the Salvation Army published the tune "Rachie" being sung to the words: "Hark! the sounds of singing, coming on the breeze. Notes of triumph winging, over lands and seas" (Charles Collier, 1915). The tune was published in The Salvation Army Tune Book for Congregational Singing. Later, the tune became the perfect accompaniment for the words of the hymn "Who is on the Lord's side?". This pairing was popularised in various hymn books from the 1960s onwards (e.g. Baptist Hymn Book, 1962; Hymns of Faith, 1964), sometimes transposed to the key of G major rather than the original A flat major.

The first recording of the tune "Rachie" appears to be on 23 June 1934 by the Salvation Army, recorded at a large Territorial Congress Salvation Army event at the Crystal Palace. The old 78 rpm recording was one of the first to be made by a mobile recording van; previously all recordings being made in a studio. The 78 rpm disc went on sale just three months later.

This first recording of "Rachie" started with the then General of the Salvation Army, General Edward Wiggins, who introduced the hymn, followed by a musical introduction from the united bands. The single microphone is suddenly moved around–first to record General Wiggins singing, then a soprano cornet, followed by the congregation singing. It is available on https://www.regalzonophone.com/Player MF220-MF239.htm.

The well-known male voice choir version of "Rachie" to the words I Bob Un Sydd Ffyddlon is an arrangement by Alwyn Humphreys (published by Curiad in North Wales in 1996) and has popularised an extra ending to "Rachie". This arrangement finishes with Haleliwia, Haleliwia, Moliant iddo byth, Amen (roughly translated as "Hallelujah, Hallelujah, Praise to him forever, Amen") that musically derives from the finale of the Welsh hymn tune Mawlgan (J. H. Roberts, 1848–1924).

"Rachie" is used in hymn singing in places of worship and as an exuberant tune for choirs, congregations and organs.

The opening chord of the tune "Rachie" does not follow the standard harmonisation of hymn tunes. Wyn Thomas, Senior Lecturer in Music at Bangor University, Wales (UK), comments as follows: "This tune is exceptional amongst Welsh hymn tunes, in that it begins with a tonic chord in its first inversion (i.e. a Ib chord or a I 6/3 chord). This is unheard of in the Welsh hymn tune repertoire because all other hymn tune composers establish the fundamental tonic (root-position) chord (i.e. chord Ia or I 5/3 chord) at the outset, with the tonic note in the bass part. Though Dr Caradog Roberts opens "Rachie" with a tonic chord, the 3rd of the chord appears in the bass part. This chordal arrangement gives rise to tonal ambiguity and can cause difficulty during unaccompanied performances."

== See also ==
- Resolven
- Cymanfa Ganu
- Rhosllannerchrugog#Musical heritage
