= Rhosllanerchrugog =

Village in Wales

Rhosllanerchrugog: Rhos
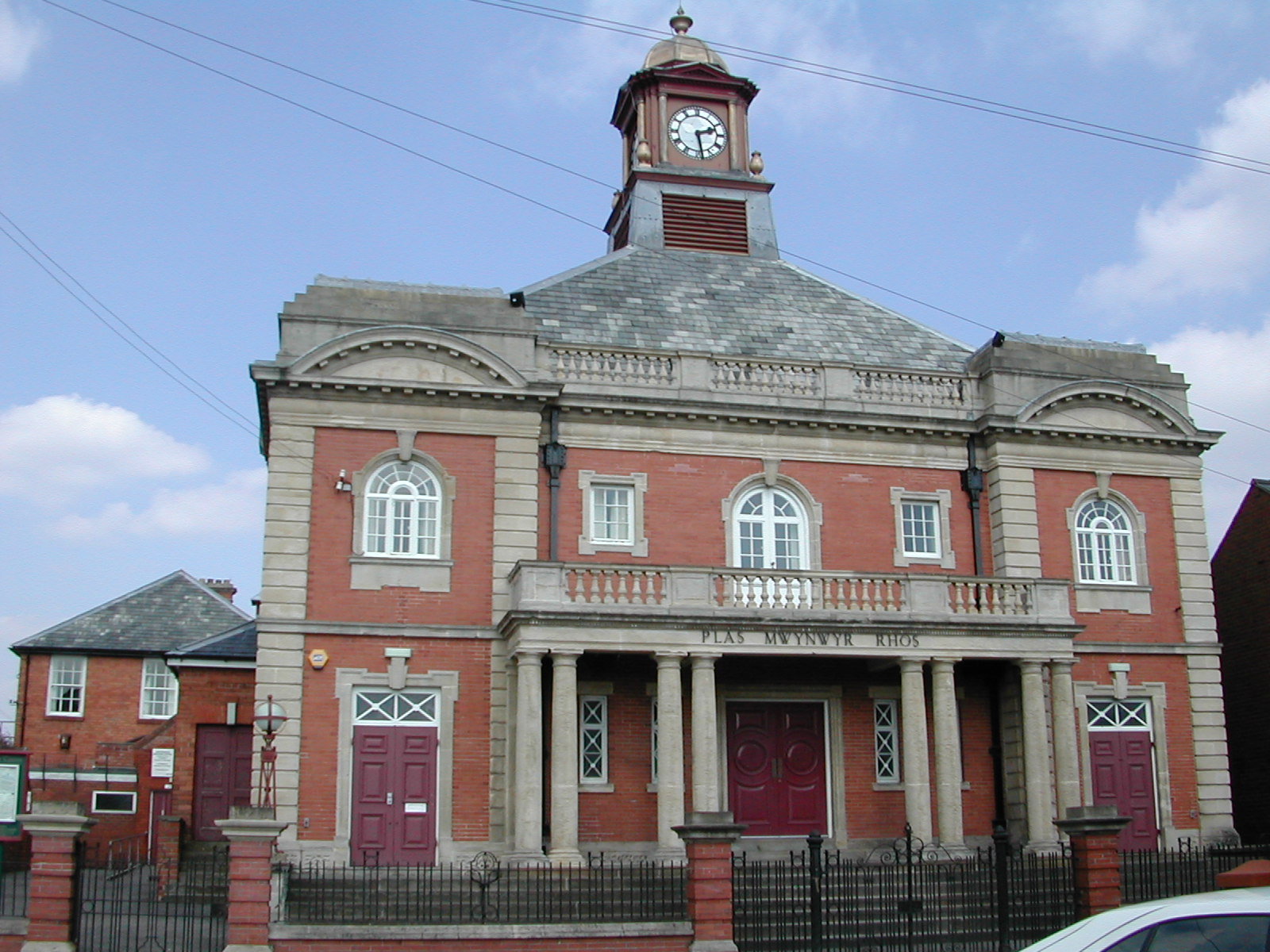
- Stiwt Theatre, Broad Street

- Location within Wrexham
- Population: 9,694 Census 2011
- OS grid reference: SJ295465
- Community: Rhosllanerchrugog
- Principal area: Wrexham
- Preserved county: Clwyd
- Country: Wales
- Sovereign state: United Kingdom
- Post town: WREXHAM
- Postcode district: LL14
- Dialling code: 01978
- Police: North Wales
- Fire: North Wales
- Ambulance: Welsh
- UK Parliament: Montgomeryshire and Glyndŵr
- Senedd Cymru – Welsh Parliament: Clwyd South
- List of places UK Wales Wrexham 53.011°N 3.052°W Map of the community

Rhosllanerchrugog (/ˌroʊsˌlænərˈkriːɡɒɡ/; standardised and also spelled as Rhosllannerchrugog, [r̥ɔsˌɬanɛrχˈrɨːɡɔɡ] or simply Rhos) is a village and community in Wrexham County Borough, Wales. It lies within the historic county of Denbighshire. The entire built-up area including Penycae, Ruabon and Cefn Mawr had a population of 25,362.

== Etymology ==
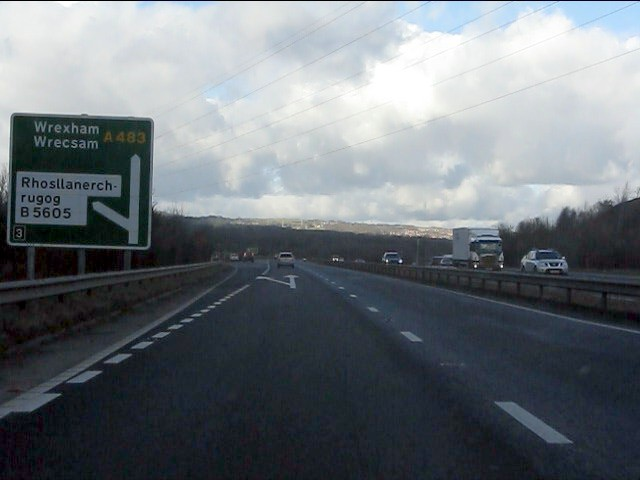
Road signs showing spellings of the village name.

The name of the village is derived from that of the old Llanerchrugog estate, once one of the landholdings of Cynwrig ap Rhiwallon, Lord of Maelor Gymraeg. The name Llanerchrugog is usually stated to be based on Welsh llannerch ('clearing' or 'glade'), and (with soft mutation), grugog ('heathery'), although an etymology based on crugog ('hilly' or 'rough') has also been suggested. The name of the mining village which later grew up on nearby moorland was usually written as Rhos Llanerchrugog, ('the Llanerchrugog moor', literally 'moor, heath of the heather glade') in the early and mid-19th century, but later often became written as Rhos-llanerchrugog and finally as a single word. The spelling Rhosllannerchrugog has also been used since 1997 as an alternative to the legal community name.

Locally, it is usually known simply as Rhos, or (in Welsh English) as the Rhos. In the dialect of the area this is invariably pronounced ['r̥əus], in opposition to the Standard Welsh [r̥oːs].

== History ==
The village was originally within the ancient parish of Ruabon and the township of Morton Above (i.e. Morton, or moor town, above Offa's Dyke) or Morton Wallichorum (the Welsh Morton). In 1844 Morton Above, along with part of the neighbouring township of Dynhinlle Ucha, became part of the newly created parish of Rhosllanerchrugog.

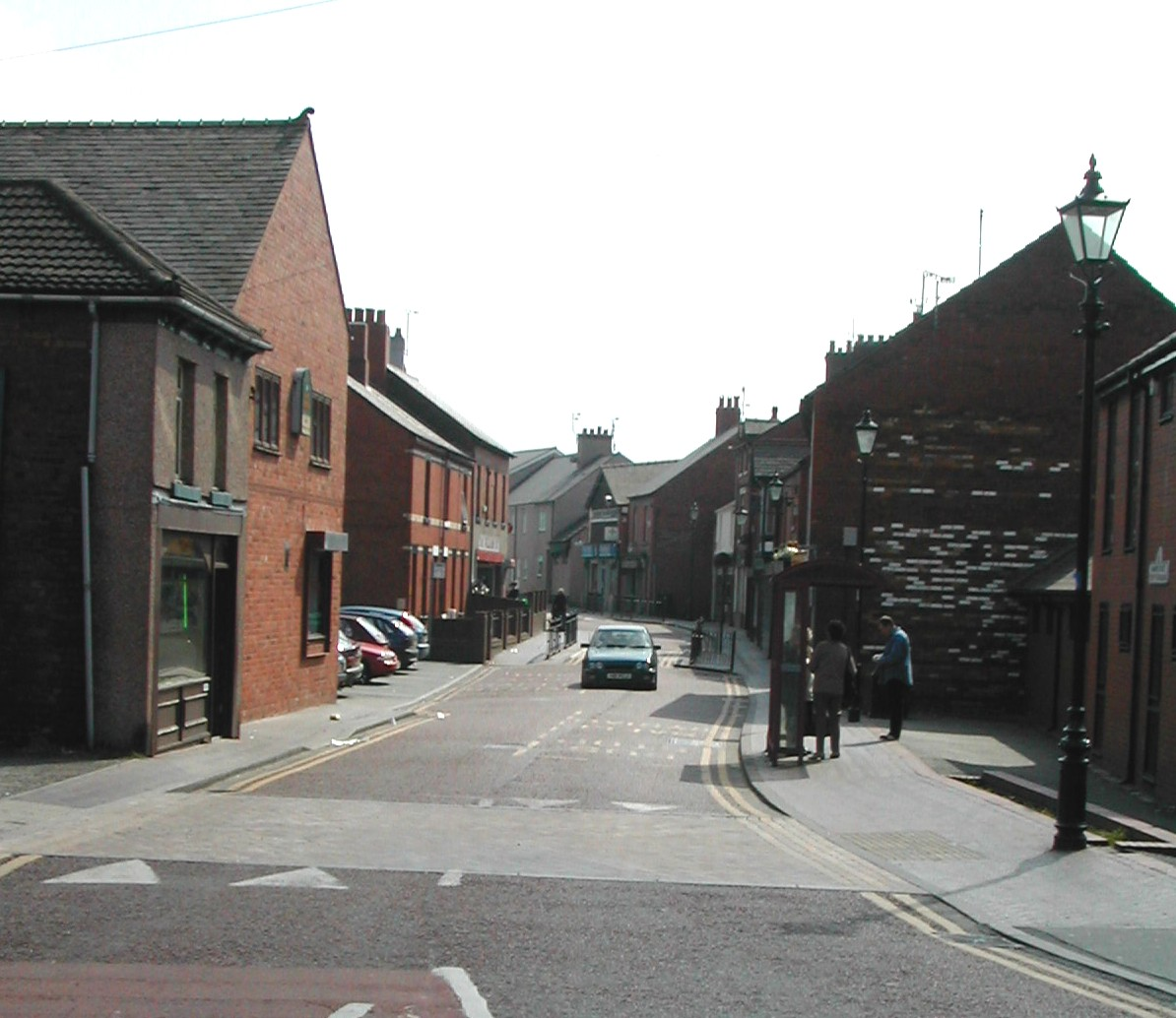
High Street

The Llanerchrugog estate itself was owned by the Jones family from at least the 1400s to the 19th century; in 1649 the landowner John Jones of Llanerchrugog claimed a detailed genealogy going back 2400 years to Dyfnwal Moelmud, and attempted to use his ancient rights of ownership to argue he should be exempt from taxes.

The development of the village can be attributed largely to the coal seams of north-east Wales that pass near it. The burgesses of Holt were granted the right to dig for coal at Rhos in their borough charter of 1563. A coal mining community was established during the 18th century, and grew substantially from the 1840s onwards. Unlike many other mining villages in the district and in other parts of Wales, the majority of early immigration to Rhos was from Welsh-speaking upland agricultural areas in West Wales, giving the village a distinct linguistic identity which it has retained until the present day. The proportion of Welsh-speakers in Rhos did not fall below 50% until the time of the 1981 census.

By the early 18th century the Rhosllanerchrugog mines were the property of the future Sir Watkin Williams-Wynn, 3rd Baronet, of Wynnstay, a member of the area's major landowning family and a prominent Jacobite. At the accession of George I in August 1714, Williams-Wynn incited the miners of Rhos to march to Wrexham, singing Jacobite songs, to sack two Dissenting meeting houses, to smash the windows of Whig tradesmen and to prevent the bells of Wrexham church ringing to celebrate the accession.

The available notes of Mr Kenrick, minister of the New Meeting, dispute many of these assertions. In Wrexham, it was on July 15, 1715 (before George I's accession), that Tory resentment overflowed into riots that were mainly directed at the Dissenters. The New Meeting House was destroyed and the Old Meeting House was badly damaged. The colliers came into town on July 20, 1715 to help and protect the rioters. Upon request from the Dissenters, Watkin Williams-Wynn interceded and persuaded the men to desist. Sporadic rioting continued, at least until October 20, 1715, which was the King's Coronation Day.

The Jacobite politics of the district's landlord and his tenants is popularly thought to be the source of the nickname "Jackos" or "Jacos" still applied to inhabitants of Rhos.

A symbol of Rhos' coal-mining and labour movement heritage is seen in the "Stiwt", the miners' institute in Broad Street. This was erected and paid for by the miners, during the general strike of 1926, as, a social and cultural centre for the community. The Welsh Religious Revival of 1904 also had a major impact on Rhos. The cynghanedd "Beibl a Rhaw i Bobl y Rhos" ("a bible and a spade for the people of Rhos") reflects the importance of both coal-mining and the chapels on the village's culture and heritage. The later strength of Nonconformity in Rhos became one of the village's distinctive features, along with its dialect, working-class institutions, and tradition of education, which for decades meant that no school in the area "[seemed] complete without a teacher from Rhos on the staff".

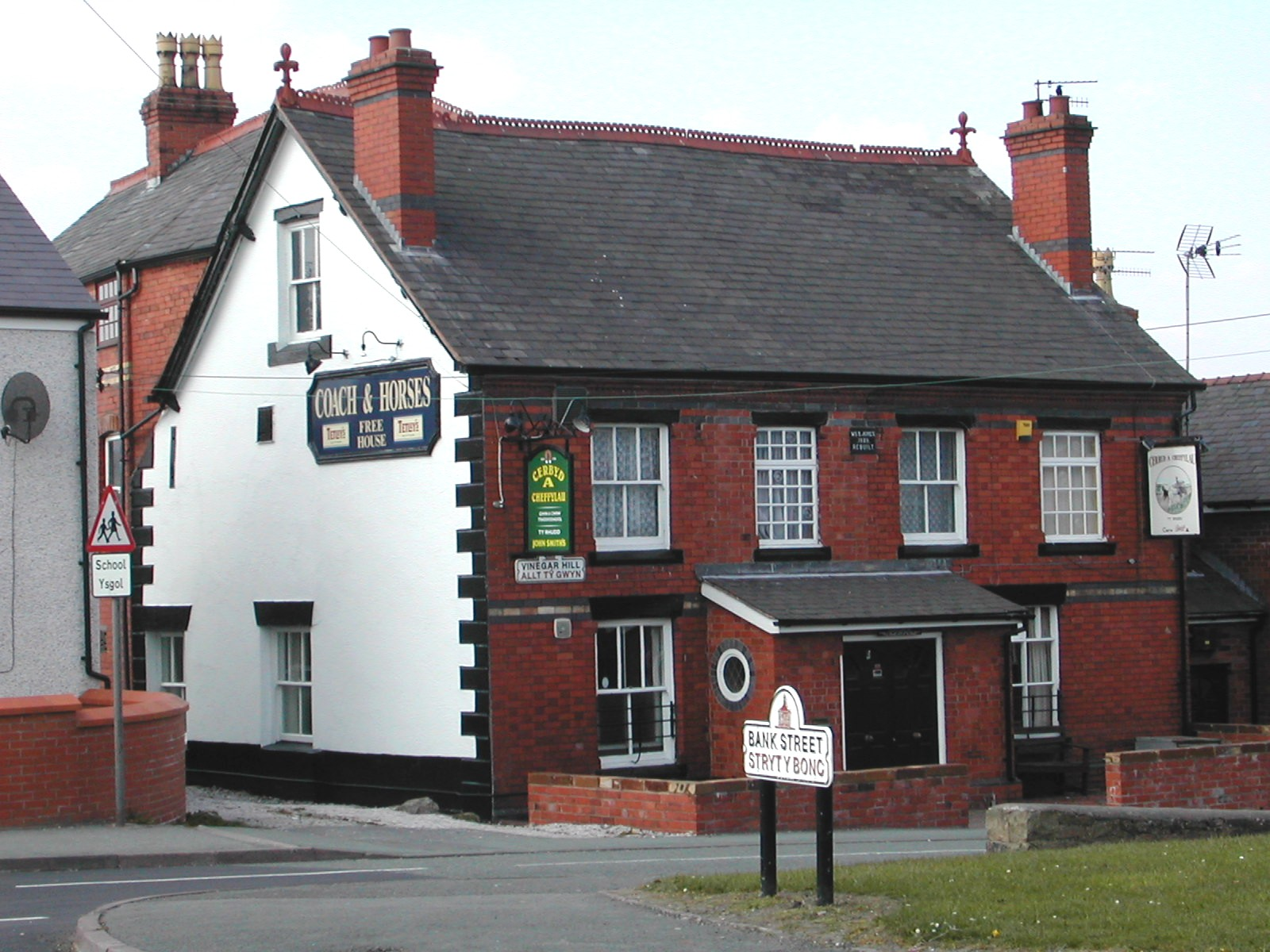
Coach & Horses public house, Vinegar Hill

Rhos hosted the National Eisteddfod in 1945 and 1961, and the Celtic League was founded there in 1961 during the Eisteddfod. The many informal fringe performances around this event were memorialised in the poem "The Cross Foxes" by Harri Webb, remembering the night when in Rhos "we drank the pub dry".

With a population of over 10,000, the modern community of Rhosllanerchrugog is one of the largest in Wales. The 2011 census showed that the population of the built-up area of Rhosllanerchrugog including adjoining Pen-y-cae is 13,501. The area retains a proportion of Welsh speakers above the national average, despite the loss of older speakers and the impact of non-Welsh speakers moving into the area: the 2001 Census showed that 31.5% of the community area was Welsh speaking, declining to 24% at the 2011 census. Welsh medium education is, however, popular and significantly increasing in the area.

== Architecture ==
Rhos contains a number of listed public buildings. Notable buildings in the village include:

The Stiwt Theatre, formerly the "Miners' Institute" (Plas Mwynwyr), which was built in 1926 to the designs of John Owen of Wrexham and F. A. Roberts, Mold. The Institute closed in 1977, following which the local council purchased the building in 1978. They decided to demolish the building in 1985, but it was saved as a result of local campaigning. Following fundraising efforts, it was renovated and reopened as a community theatre. The Stiwt Theatre holds the Wrexham young people's music festival since 2006. The Stiwt now do various shows and the grade II* listed building is open to the public to see.

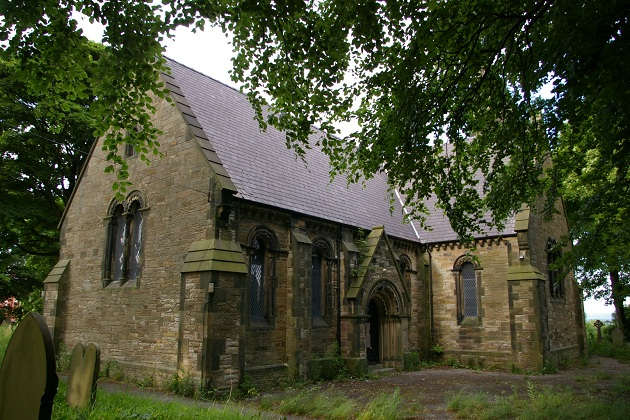
St John's Anglican parish church, 1852.

Church of St John Evangelist A grade II listed building, built in 1852 to a design by Thomas Penson and consecrated on 4 October 1853. A good example of a Romanesque Revival church, it is Norman style, with coursed and squared sandstone and slate roofs. It has a cruciform plan with nave, transept and chancel and bell tower in the angle of the south transept and the chancel. The church closed in 2004. The churchyard contains war graves of a British and a Canadian soldier of the First World War.

St David's Welsh Church, built in 1892 to a design by Douglas and Fordham of Chester. Since the closure of St. John's, this was used as the parish church until its closure in the early 2020s.

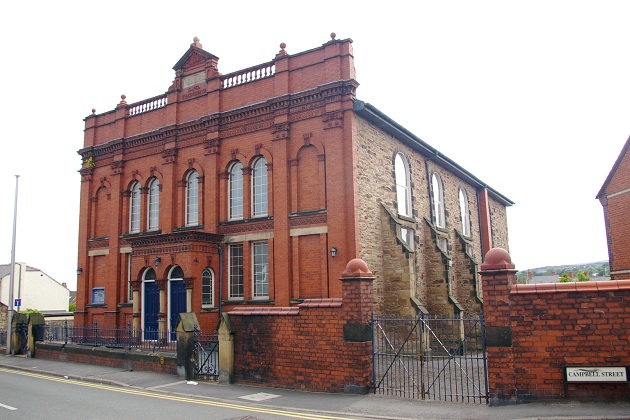
Penuel Welsh Baptist Chapel, 1856-9

Penuel Chapel (Capel Penuel) Two-storey Welsh Baptist chapel built in 1856–59, with a brick façade installed during renovations performed in 1891 to the designs of Owen Morris Roberts, Porthmadog. The chapel was the starting point site of R. B. Jones's campaign in the village during the religious revival in 1904–05. One of the chapel's ministers was Lewis Valentine.

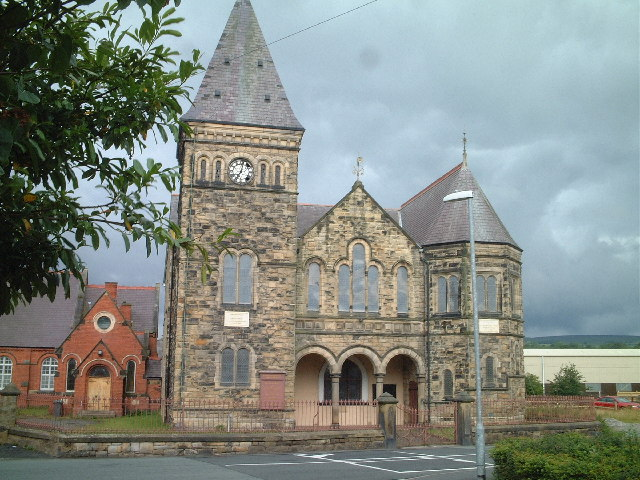
Capel Bach, Hall Street

Capel Bach, officially Bethlehem Welsh Independent Chapel, Hall Street. First built in 1812 and rebuilt in 1839, 1876 and (also to designs by architect Owen Morris Roberts of Porthmadog) in 1889. A large, two-storey Romanesque chapel with integral clock tower and canted stair tower: grade II listed as a prominent feature of Rhos and an unusual example of a Rundbogenstil facade. There is a 1908 organ by Norman and Beard: the composer Caradog Roberts was the organist here between 1904 and 1935.

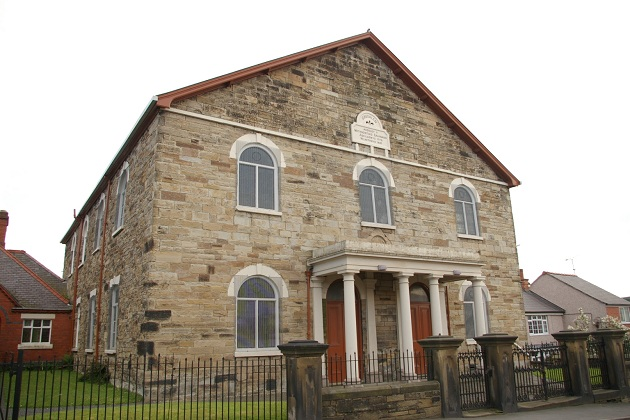
Capel Mawr, Brook Street.

Capel Mawr, officially Jerusalem Welsh Calvinistic Methodist Chapel, Brook Street, is a grade II listed chapel, built of stone in a classical gable-entry style. It was first built in 1770 and rebuilt in 1876 to the designs of Richard Owen of Liverpool. Fittings include a war memorial tablet and a 1927 stained glass window by Jones and Willis.

== Religious Revival 1904-1905 ==
Rhos was one of the centres of the Welsh Religious Revival of 1904–1905. R. B. Jones, a visiting Baptist preacher, held a campaign in Penuel Baptist Chapel, Rhosllanerchrugog in November 1904.

== Musical heritage ==
Rhos is known for its musical heritage, and has a concert hall at the Stiwt Theatre. Composers from the village include Caradog Roberts, best known for the hymn tune "Rachie"; and Arwel Hughes, conductor and composer of the hymn tune "Tydi a Roddaist". Notable performers from Rhos include the baritone James Sauvage and pianist Llŷr Williams.

Rhos has several choirs, including the Rhos Male Voice Choir (Côr Meibion Rhosllannerchrugog); the Rhos Orpheus Male Voice Choir (Côr Orffiws Y Rhos); Johns' Boys Male Chorus (Côr Meibion Johns' Boys); a Pensioners' Choir (Côr Pensiynwyr Rhosllannerchrugog); a Girls' Choir (Côr Merched Rhosllannerchrugog); and the Rhos Singers (Cantorion Rhos), a mixed voice choir. The male voice choirs have performed in many countries.

The Rhos Prize Silver Band was formed in 1884, but later became known as the Hafod Colliery Band. After the closure of Hafod Colliery in 1968 the band was renamed Rhos and District Silver Band. In 2001, the band changed its name to Wrexham Brass and is now based at the Glyndŵr University campus in Wrexham.

== Dialect ==
The village is well known for its unique dialect of the Welsh language, which has been the subject of several academic studies. Although having some similarities to the dialects of both North-East and Mid Wales, it has been described as "unlike anything else heard in Wales" and as frequently unintelligible to outsiders.

As well as features found elsewhere in North Wales, such as the loss of final [v] in words such as araf, "slow" (here pronounced ['ara]) or of final [ð] in words such as ffordd, "road", (here pronounced [fɔr]), the dialect shows numerous distinctive consonants and examples of metathesis. Vowels also differ widely from modern standard Welsh: one of its key features is the diphthongisation of vowels [e] and [o], as seen in the vowel of the name Rhos, locally ['r̥əus]. Another typical feature is the contraction of verbal phrases, so that for example Yr oedd gennyf ("I had") is rendered as ['ogai] and Mae'n rhaid i mi ("I have to") as ['haimi]. These features are to an extent becoming lost in younger speakers under the influence of Welsh medium education.

The Rhos dialect is also known for a unique vocabulary. The main example is a word that has become synonymous with the village: the demonstrative adjective nene (pronounced approximately [neːneː]), meaning "that", or more specifically "that over there". While the related forms ene ("that") and dene ("there [...] is") are found in other parts of North-East Wales, nene is specific to Rhos.

The word's association with the village is reflected in the title of the community's monthly newspaper, Nene, founded by the campaigner and local historian Ieuan Roberts ("Ieu Rhos", 1949–2016). In usage Nene is also combined with ene; an example is the question "Be 'di nene ene?" - "What's that there?"

== Cemetery controversy ==
In September 2006, letters were sent by Rhos Community Council to relatives of people buried in the village's cemetery, where former Miss World Rosemarie Frankland is buried, asking them to limit the number of floral tributes left at grave sites. The council reportedly planned to cover the cemetery with a lawn and feared that such tributes would breach health and safety rules. Feeling the council had handled the issue insensitively, relatives collected an 850-signature petition and 60 families made a public protest.

== Notable people ==
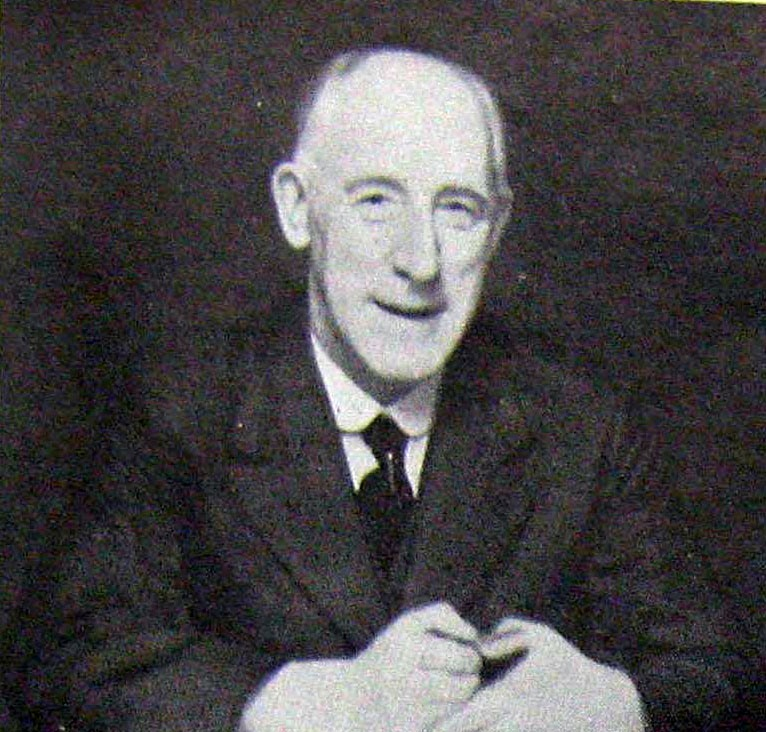
I.D.Hooson

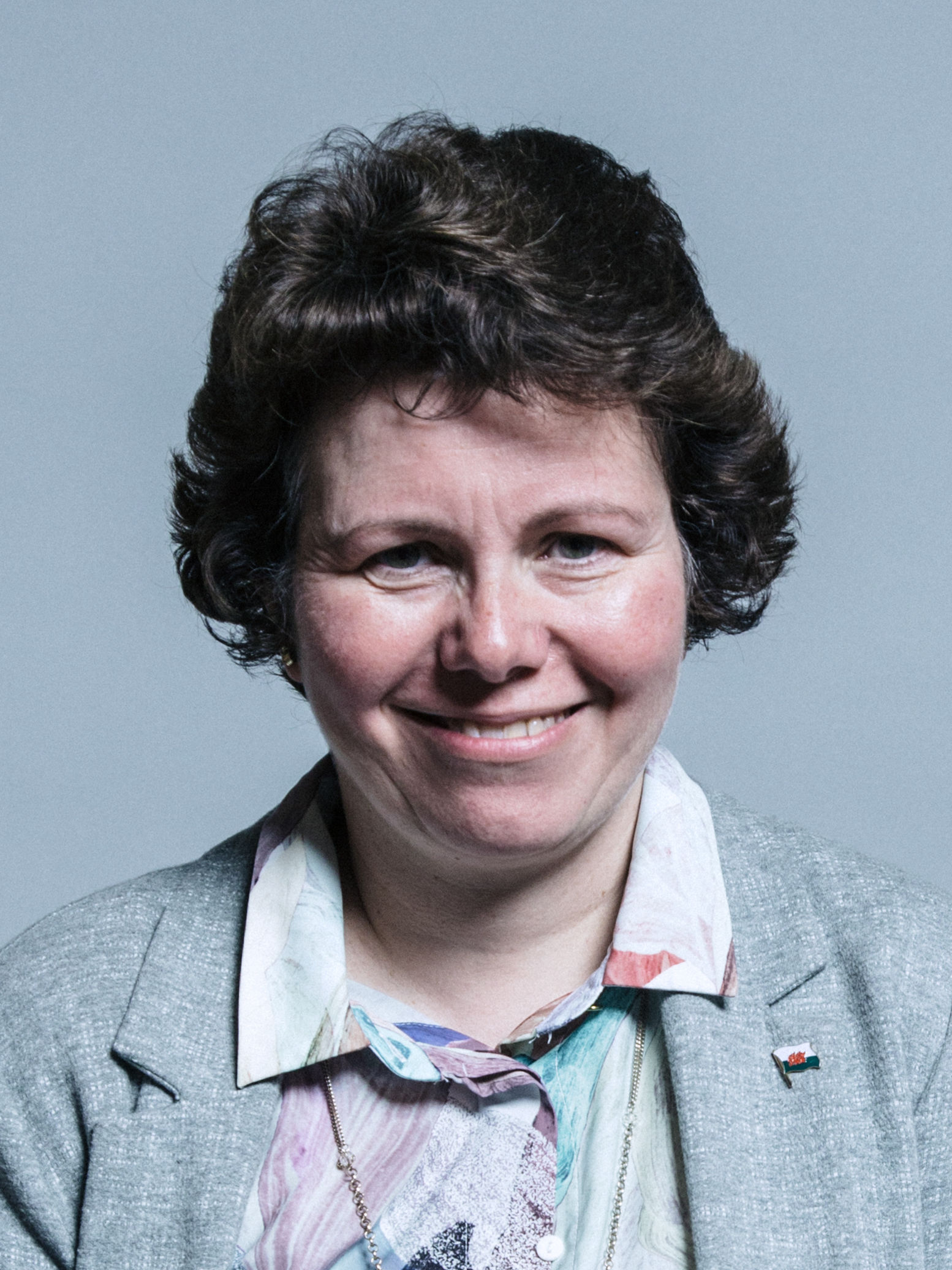
Susan Elan Jones, 2017

See Category:People from Rhosllanerchrugog

- James Sauvage (1849–1922) baritone singer.
- Robert Roberts (1865-1945), footballer with 38 caps for Crewe Alexandra F.C. and 2 for Wales
- Caradog Roberts (1878—1935), composer, organist and choirmaster.
- Isaac Daniel Hooson (1880–1948), solicitor and poet.
- Thomas William Jones, Baron Maelor (1898–1984), politician, MP for Merioneth
- Idwal Jones (1900–1982), politician, MP for Denbigh
- Arwel Hughes (1909–1988), orchestral conductor and composer.
- Meredith Edwards (1917–1999), character actor and writer.
- Tom Ellis (1924–2010), politician, MP for Wrexham
- Gordon Richards (1933–1993) footballer with 170 club caps.
- Rosemarie Frankland (1943–2000), Miss Wales, Miss UK and Miss World 1961.
- Aled Roberts (1962–2022), politician and Welsh Language Commissioner, 2019-2022.
- Stifyn Parri (born 1962), actor and TV personality
- Mark Lewis Jones (born 1964), actor
- Susan Elan Jones (born 1968 in Ponciau), politician, MP for Clwyd South
- Llŷr Williams (born 1976 in Pentre Bychan), concert pianist.
- Daniel Lloyd (born 1982), actor and singer-songwriter

== Stiwt Theatre ==
The Stiwt is a 490-seater theatre located in the village. Founded in 1926 by the Miner's Institute, (lending it its name, 'Stiwt' coming from the word 'Institute' in 'Miner's Institute'), the day-to-day running of the Stiwt was paid for by weekly contributions from the Miner's wages. Paying in 20d a week, the Stiwt was both built and run by the wages of the Miners, the descendants of which continually have to fight to keep it open after almost facing closure in 1977, 1996 and 2016. Today the Stiwt is funded and run by Wrexham County Borough Council, the Arts Council of Wales, Rhos Community Council and Friends of the Stiwt.

== Transport ==
The village was once linked to the Great Western Railway by the Rhos Branch, which ran to the village from nearby Wrexham via Rhostyllen and Legacy Station (near Talwrn, named after the short-lived Legacy colliery). Passenger services opened with great celebration on 1 October 1901, with around a thousand people carried on the first day. In 1905 the passenger service was extended to halts at Brook Street (the location of the Rhos goods station), Pant and (via the former Ruabon Brook Tramway) Wynn Hall, although goods trains ran through to Froncysyllte wharf on the Shropshire Union Canal via Plas Bennion and Acrefair. Passenger services were discontinued in 1931, except for Saturday football specials which ran occasionally until 1951-1952. To the East of Rhos a second line had been laid in 1868 North from Gardden Lodge Junction (near Ruabon) and extended as far as Bryn-yr-Owen colliery, and in 1874 was extended to the Legacy Colliery (which suspended production in mid-1874 with the loss of 111 jobs never to resume). When the Rhos Branch was built it linked to this line at Legacy Junction, and in 1905 the Great Western Railway introduced passenger services from Wrexham via Legacy Station, with halts at Fennant Road, Aberderfyn and trains terminating at the halt at Ponkey Crossing. The line was referred to as the Ponkey Branch line. The passenger services were withdrawn in 1915, and the line from Legacy junction was lifted a few years later, though the line south from Ponkey gasworks continued in use for freight until 1964.

Rhosllannerchrugog was also the end of the line of the Wrexham and District Electric Tramways. The tram service began operating in 1903, and originally ran from Penybryn in Wrexham to the New Inn in Johnstown, but this was soon extended up Gutter Hill to Duke Street in Rhos. The company had its depot and staging area in nearby Johnstown. The trams were eventually and gradually replaced by buses owned by the same company, which was renamed the Wrexham & District Transport Company; for many years tram lines were visible outside the garage at the bottom of Gutter Hill.

Several local companies operated bus services in the village. The red and cream buses of Phillips & Son of Rhostyllen ran from Wrexham to Rhos via Johnstown, and at one time on to Tainant, from 1927 until it was taken over by Crosville in 1979. T. Williams & Sons ran a service from Rhos to Wrexham from the 1920s until 1986. The last surviving independent local company, Wright & Son, ran a service from Pen-y-cae to Wrexham via Rhos, and later via Ponciau also. When the bus industry was deregulated in 1986 there was fierce competition between Wright's and the much larger Crosville. Wright's ceased operations in 1993, leaving Crosville as the sole service provider in the area. Crosville itself became part of the Arriva group, which still operates a frequent bus service between Rhos and Wrexham city centre.

Tickets from local bus services

The nearby A483 road provides links to Liverpool and Manchester to the north and Birmingham, Swansea and Cardiff to the south.

== See also ==
- Rhos Aelwyd
- Rhosllanerchrugog FC

== Bibliography ==
Books about Rhosllannerchrugog include:

- Hanes Rhosllannerchrugog ("The History of Rhosllannerchrugog") (1945) J. Rhosydd Williams
- Through These Windows, A Place and Its People (1981) Bill Portmadoc-Jones.
- Rhos-Llannerch-Rugog: Atgofion ("Memories of Rhosllannerchrugog") (1955) William Phillips (1880–1969)
- Rhosllannerchrugog, Johnstown, Ponciau, Pen-y-cae, a collection of pictures (2 volumes, 1991–92), Dennis W Gilpin
- From Pit to Pitch: A pictorial history of football in Rhos, John E Matthews (1991)
- Language Obsolescence and Revitalization: Linguistic Change in Two Socio-linguistically Contrasting Welsh Communities (1998) Mari Jones (study of the language of Rhosllannerchrugog)
