= Johnstown, Wrexham =

Village in Wrexham County Borough, Wales

Coordinates: 53.009°N 3.038°W

Johnstown
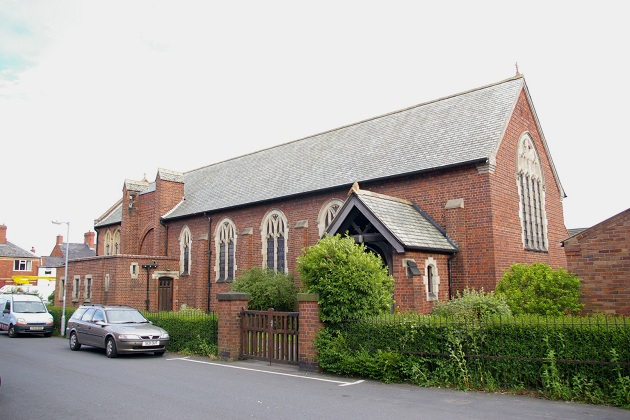
- St. Mary's Church, Johnstown

- Location within Wrexham
- Population: 3,266 (2011)
- OS grid reference: SJ303463
- Community: Rhosllannerchrugog
- Principal area: Wrexham
- Country: Wales
- Sovereign state: United Kingdom
- Post town: WREXHAM
- Postcode district: LL14
- Dialling code: 01978
- Police: North Wales
- Fire: North Wales
- Ambulance: Welsh
- UK Parliament: Clwyd South
- Senedd Cymru – Welsh Parliament: Clwyd South

Johnstown is a village (and former electoral ward) in Wrexham County Borough, Wales, and forms part of the historic coal mining community of Rhosllannerchrugog. It is thought to have been named after John Bury, a mid-19th century member of Wrexham's first Town Council, who built several houses in the area.

The disused coal mine at Hafod is situated to the east of the village and the mine's former coal tip has now been converted to a country park, Bonc yr Hafod. The nearby clay quarry was used as a landfill site for waste from Liverpool. It now takes waste from anywhere after the transfer to Cory's.

The village has approximately 4,000 inhabitants, living in 1,300 households which are split into three main areas, the Moreton Estate, Nant Parc and the older part of the village (taken from police figures). The ward population at the 2011 census was 3,266.

Johnstown is a located on the historic earth work of Offa's Dyke.

There is only one school in Johnstown: Ysgol Yr Hafod.

There are two public houses in Johnstown; The New Inn and The Grapes

In April 2012, a planning application was submitted by developers Capital & Centric Plc for a new supermarket on the disused Griflex industrial unit, potentially creating 300 jobs for the area.
