= Cefn railway station =

Disused railway station in Wales

Cefn

General information
- Location: Cefn Mawr, Wrexham; Wales
- Coordinates: 52.9693°N 3.0697°W
- Grid reference: SJ281418
- Platforms: 2

Other information
- Status: Disused

History
- Original company: Shrewsbury, Oswestry and Chester Junction Railway
- Pre-grouping: Great Western Railway
- Post-grouping: Great Western Railway

Key dates
- 12 October 1848: Station opens as Rhosymedre
- July 1849: resited and named Cefn
- 12 September 1960: Closed to passengers
Location

Cefn railway station was a minor railway station on the Great Western Railway's London to Birkenhead main line serving the mining village of Cefn Mawr in Wales. It opened as Rhosymedre in 1848 but was resited on an adjacent site in 1849 and named Cefn. It had an adjacent signal box but the station seems not to have handled freight traffic. The remains of the station and yard area can be seen just to the north of Cefn Viaduct (also known as Dee Viaduct). Although the station is gone the railway remains open as part of the Shrewsbury to Chester Line.

== Historical services ==
Express trains did not call at Cefn and the station would only have been served by West Midlands & Shrewsbury to Wrexham & Chester local trains.

== Neighbouring stations ==
Preceding station	Historical railways	Following station
Whitehurst Halt	Great Western Railway; Shrewsbury to Chester Line	Rhosymedre Halt
