= Tŷ Mawr Country Park =

Country park in Wrexham County Borough

- Parc Gwledig Tŷ Mawr (Welsh)
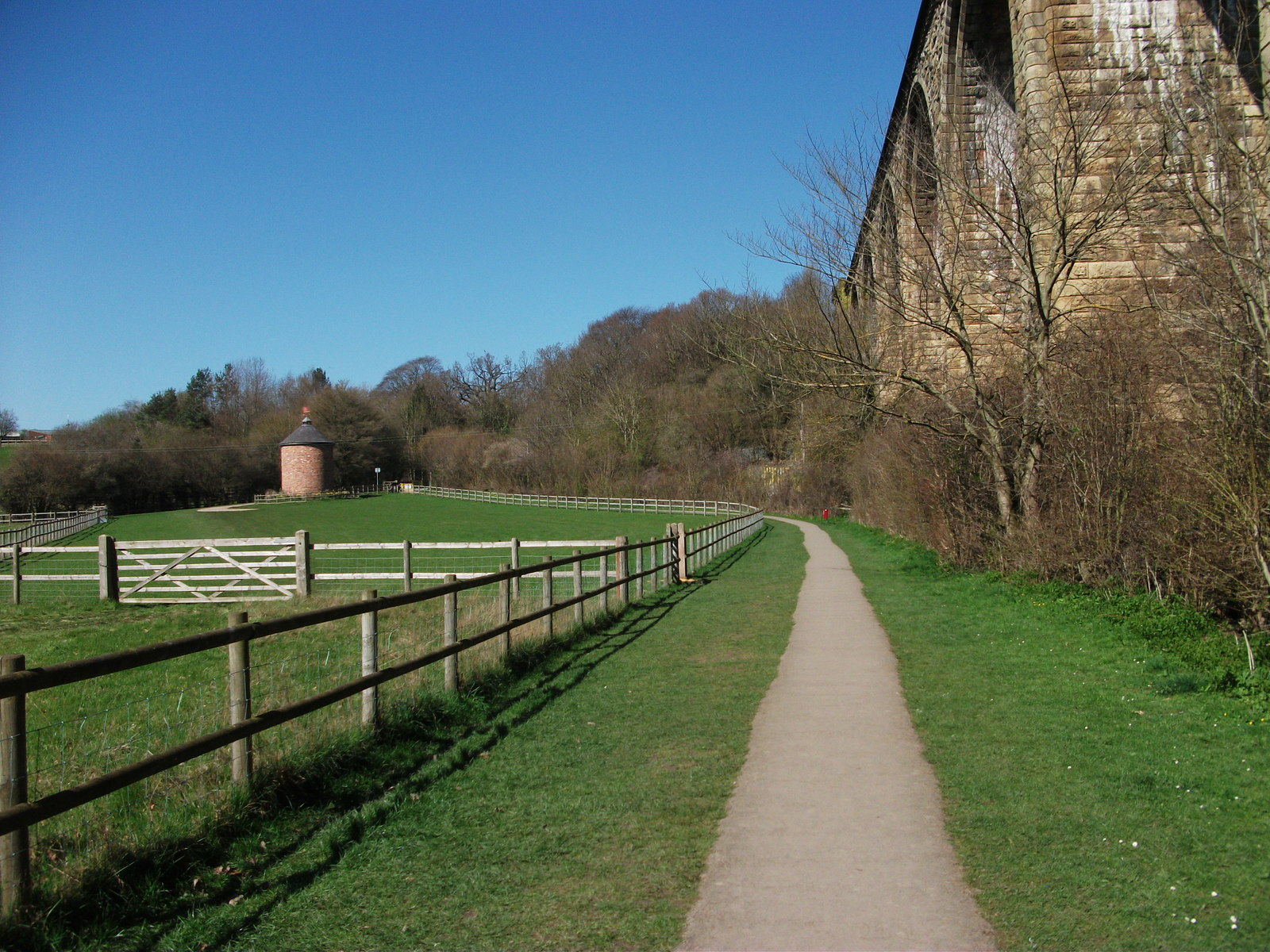
- Footpath within the park, with the Cefn Viaduct to the right and a Dovecote to the left.

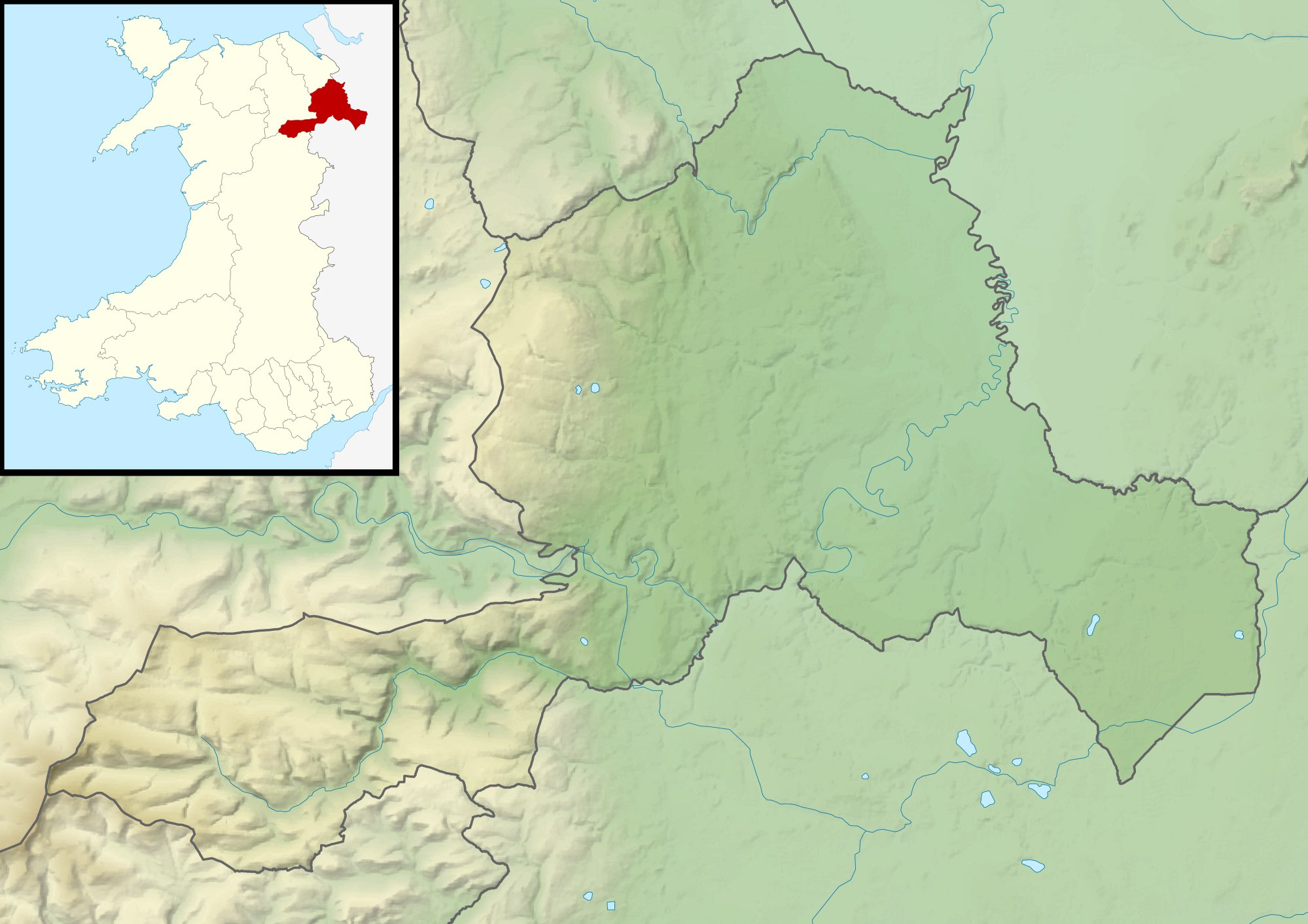
- Location within Wrexham
- Type: Country park
- Location: Cae Gwilym Lane, Cefn Mawr, Cefn, Wrexham County Borough, Wales LL14 3PE
- Nearest town: Chirk
- OS grid: SJ283413
- Coordinates: 52.964584°N 3.070795°W
- Area: 35 acres (140,000 m^{2})
- Manager: Wrexham County Borough Council
- Visitors: 47,000 (in 2016)
- Awards: Green Flag Award
- Paths: One surfaced circular pathway (1 mi (1.6 km))
- Species: Domesticated animals
- Parking: Pay and display
- Public transit: Ruabon (2 miles (3.2 km) north)
- Facilities: public toilets; Visitor centre; BMX track; Trim trail; play area
- Website: wrexham.gov.uk/service/parks-and-countryside/ty-mawr-country-park

Tŷ Mawr Country Park (Welsh: Parc Gwledig Tŷ Mawr) is a country park and farm park near Cefn Mawr in Wrexham County Borough, Wales. The country park lies between Cefn-bychan and Newbridge to the north, the River Dee to the south and west, and the Cefn Viaduct carrying the Shrewsbury–Chester line to the east.

== Description ==
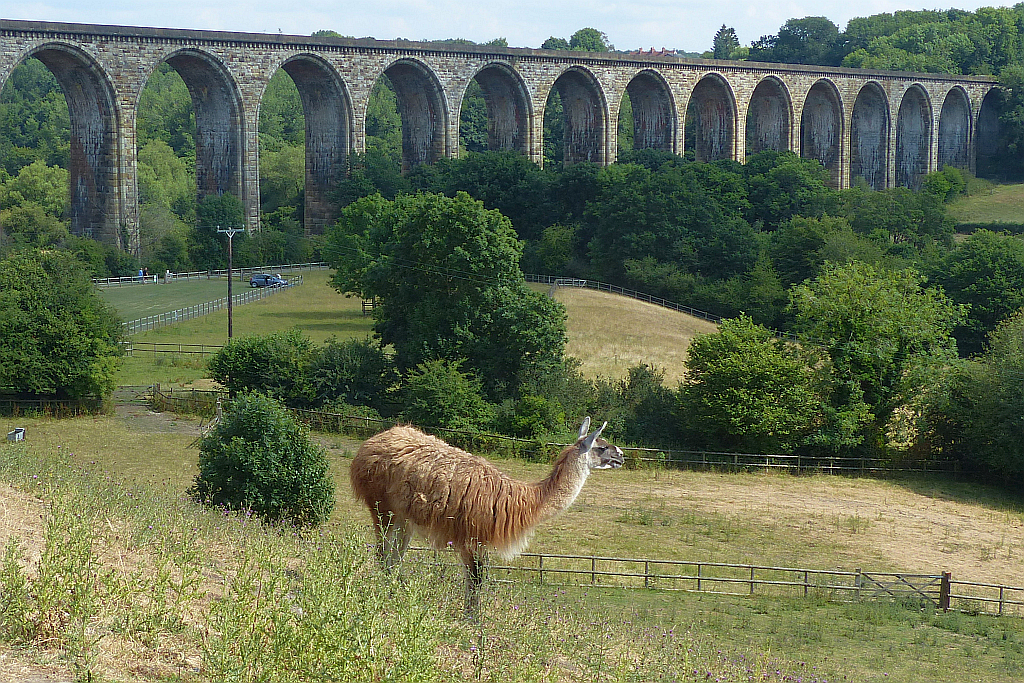
A llama in the country park, with the Cefn Viaduct behind.

The country park lies on the banks of the River Dee and its SSSI, within the Vale of Llangollen in the Dee Valley. It is situated next to and underneath the stone-built Cefn Viaduct carrying the Shrewsbury to Chester railway line. It is situated 5 miles (8.0 km) south of Wrexham. The park is downstream from Pontcysyllte Aqueduct has been within the boundaries of the buffer zone of the aqueduct's World Heritage Site since 2009, and within the Clwydian Range and Dee Valley Area of Outstanding Natural Beauty since 2011.

The country park has been accredited with the Green Flag Award annually since 2006.

The park is connected to the Cefn Mawr Heritage Trail, a longer circular walk, and the Viaduct - Aqueduct Walk. It is also located near the Offa's Dyke National Trail and parts of Offa's Dyke on the otherside of the River Dee.

There is a picnic area with some wooden sculptures which overlooks the viaduct.

In 2016, the park had 47,000 visitors. In July 2024, the country park was awarded the Green Flag Award.

=== Farm park ===
The country park hosts a "farm park" (a petting zoo situated in an organic working farm), home to various farm animals, such as donkeys, sheep, pigs, goats, chickens, ducks and the two llamas in the park, named Carlos and Pedro who guard the sheep from foxes. The park also contains organic wildflower meadows, various wild birds, insects and other wild animals which thrive on the park's land due to the absence of any use of chemicals and pesticides.

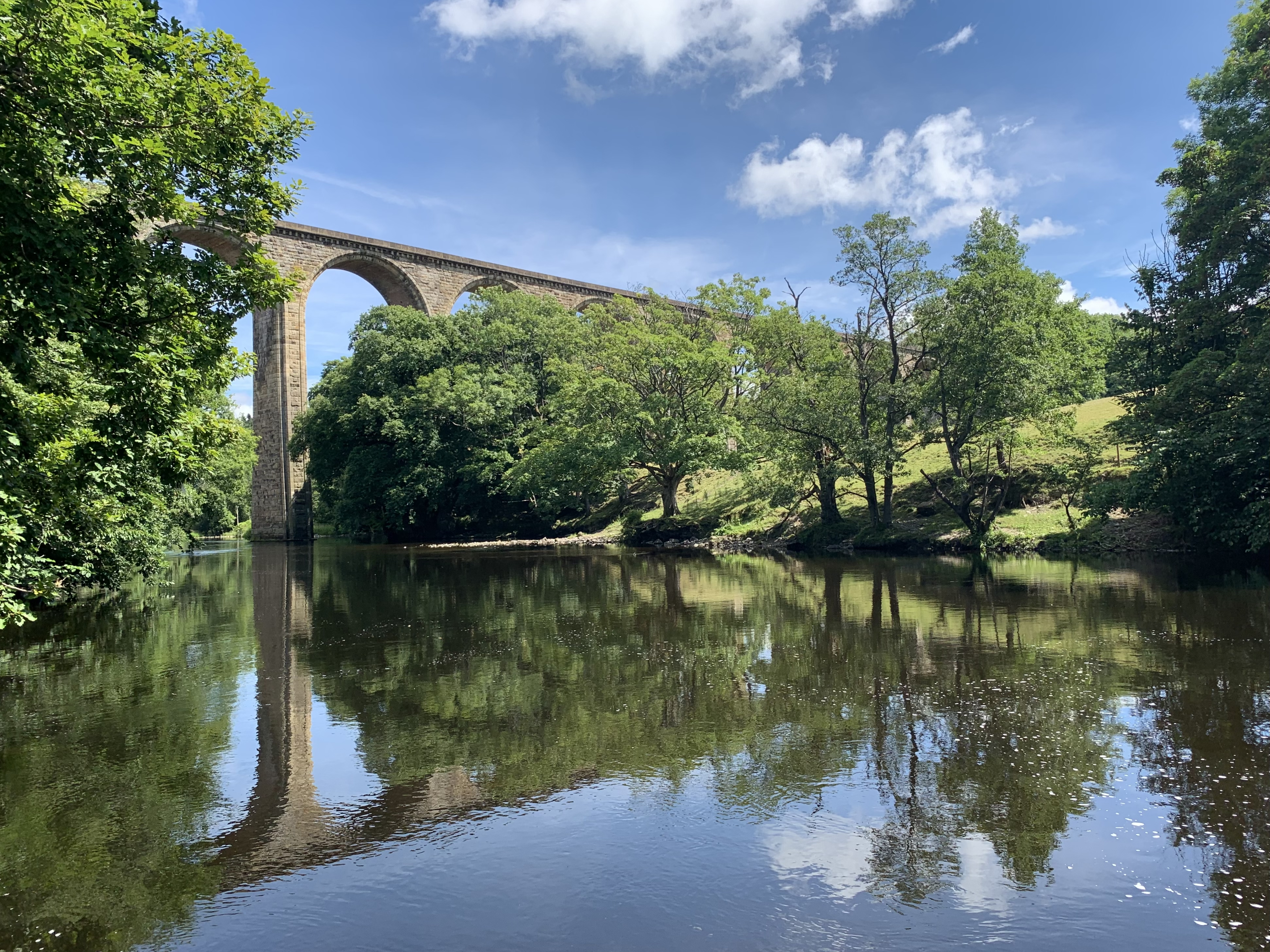
The River Dee next to the park, with the Cefn Mawr Viaduct in the background.

The park hosts Visitor centre and a Barn Centre which serves as the community centre for the park, used for education, park events, children's birthday parties, or various community or private events.

==== Sponsorship scheme ====
Since 2006, there has been a sponsorship scheme at the country park to support the animals within the park. Animals open to sponsorship are: llamas, sheep, goats, rabbits, ducks, chickens, cats and guinea pigs. They cost either £10 or £15 annually depending on animal.

== Tŷ Mawr Trail ==
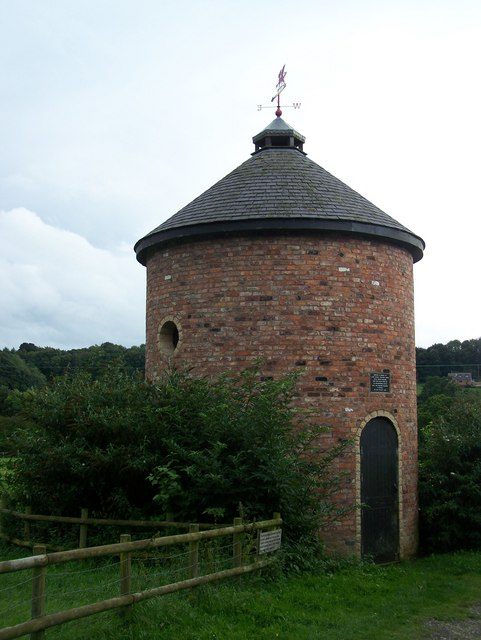
Front of the Dovecote

The country park contains a 1 mile (1.6 km) circular trail on tarmac surfaced footpaths. Starting at the visitor centre and going anti-clockwise, the trail passes a goat field, the River Dee and Aqueduct Path, a riverside beach, then parallels the Cefn Viaduct until it reaches a Dovecote and the "Mini Beast Woods".

== Larry the Llama ==
Logo of the park

On 5 February 2009, "Larry the Llama" (full name Lawrence) who was based at the country park since 2003 was transferred out of the park due to his attacks on the park's sheep. Llamas are housed at the country park to guard the sheep on site from wild foxes. By 2009, the llama was discovered to be biting and chasing the park's sheep, inflicting serious injuries on some. Senior ranger Liz Carding theorised that the events could have been a power struggle over food, with Carding stating that Larry may have realised that if he had scared sheep away there would be more food for himself. Staff at the park initially separated Larry from the sheep, but his behaviour failed to improve, and Larry the Llama was moved to a farm in Powys. Two new Llamas were bought as replacements and delivered to the park in March 2009, the llama half-brothers Carlos and Pedro from Cheshire.

== See also ==
- Parks and open spaces in Wrexham
- Wynnstay
- Shrewsbury and Chester Railway
