= Cefn Viaduct =

Cefn Viaduct may refer to one of these places in Wales:

- Cefn Coed Viaduct, viaduct in Merthyr Tydfil County Borough
- Cefn Newbridge Viaduct, viaduct in Wrexham County Borough
