= Cefn Mawr =

Village in Wrexham County Borough, Wales

Coordinates: 52.973°N 3.076°W

Cefn Mawr: Welsh: Cefn-mawr
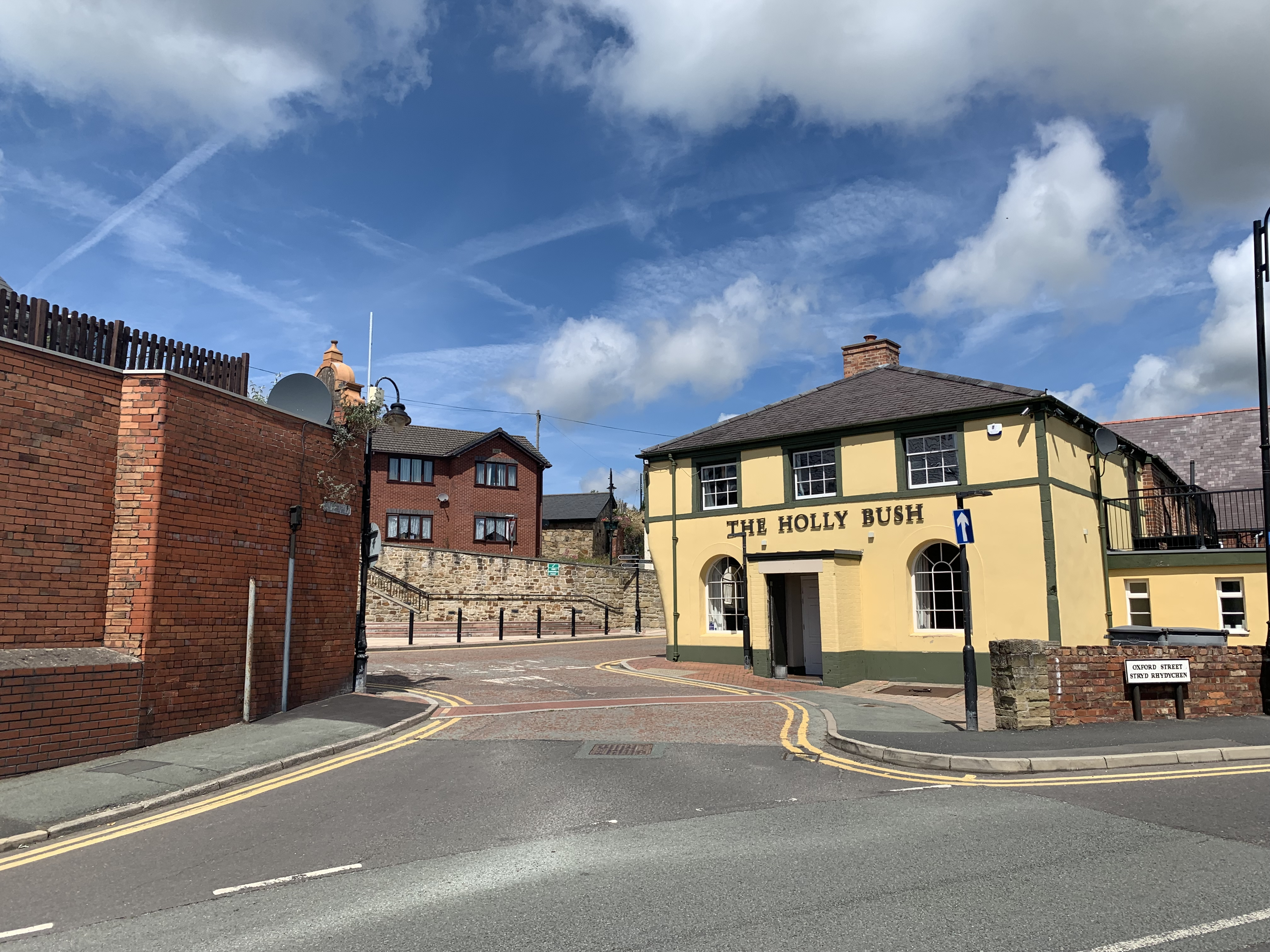
- The Holly Bush pub in the centre of the village.

- Location within Wrexham
- Population: 6,669 (2001 Census, includes the villages Acrefair, Rhosymedre and Newbridge)
- OS grid reference: SJ277423
- Community: Cefn
- Principal area: Wrexham
- Preserved county: Clwyd
- Country: Wales
- Sovereign state: United Kingdom
- Post town: WREXHAM
- Postcode district: LL14
- Dialling code: 01978
- Police: North Wales
- Fire: North Wales
- Ambulance: Welsh
- UK Parliament: Montgomeryshire and Glyndŵr
- Senedd Cymru – Welsh Parliament: Wrexham

Cefn Mawr (Welsh: Cefn-mawr; Welsh pronunciation) is a village in the community of Cefn within Wrexham County Borough, Wales. Its name translates as "big ridge". The population in 2001 was 6,669, increasing to 7,051 in 2011.

The community of Cefn comprises the villages of Cefn Mawr, Cefn-bychan ("little ridge"), Acrefair, Penybryn, Newbridge, Plas Madoc and Rhosymedre and is situated on the northern slopes of the Dee Valley.

== History ==
Cefn Mawr was part of the ancient parish of Ruabon and the area was known as Cristionydd Cynrig (or Cristioneth Kenrick in English). In 1844, most of Cristionydd Cynrig, together with the neighbouring township of Coed Cristionydd became part of the new parish of Rhosymedre.

Cefn railway station served the village from 1848 to 1960.

== Industry ==
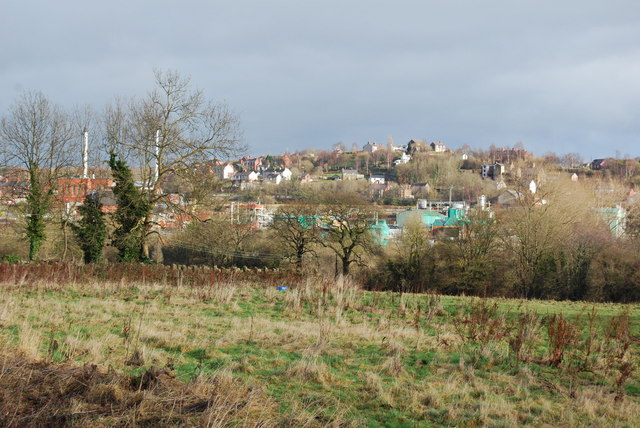
The former chemical works at Cefn Mawr, with the village on the hillside above

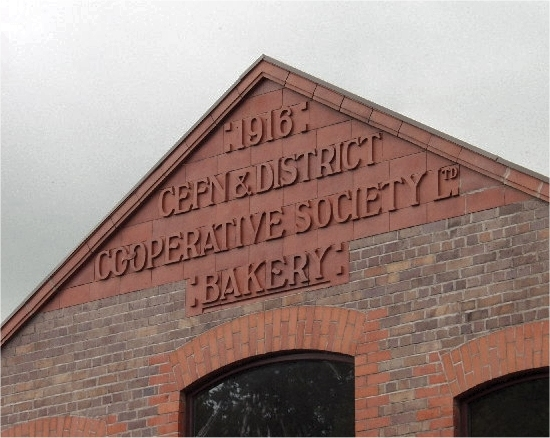
The former bakery of the Cefn & District Co-operative Society

Cefn Mawr was formerly heavily industrialised, with large deposits of iron and coal and sandstone, and heavy industry dominated the area in the 18th and 19th centuries. Iron was worked at several blast furnaces and forges throughout the area and coal was mined at pits in Cefn, Plas Kynaston and Dolydd. Stone was cut at quarries above Cefn Mawr. Much of the mineral wealth of the area was exported by canal over the Pontcysyllte Aqueduct on the Shropshire Union Canal, until the railway reached Ruabon in 1855.

In 1867 Robert Ferdinand Graesser, an industrial chemist from Obermosel in Saxony, Germany, established a chemical works at Plas Kynaston to extract paraffin oil and paraffin wax from the local shale. The company later expanded into the production of coal tar, and carbolic acid (phenol). The site soon became the world's leading producer of phenol. In 1919 the US chemical company Monsanto entered into a partnership with Graesser's chemical works to produce vanillin, salicylic acid, aspirin, and later rubber processing chemicals. The site was later operated by Flexsys, a subsidiary of Solutia, but production ceased in 2010. With the closure of the nearby Air Products and Chemicals site (formerly Hughes and Lancaster, and before that the New British Iron Company) at Acrefair, manufacturing in the village has almost disappeared. A large Tesco store was opened in March 2012 on the former site of the village football team, Cefn Druids. After buying this land, Tesco agreed to contribute to the construction of the new football ground located half a mile (1 km) away near the neighbouring village of Rhosymedre.

== Notable residents ==
- Miles Thomas, (1897–1980), former chairman of the British Overseas Airway Corporation.
- Peter Halliday (1924–2012), actor most prominently featured in Doctor Who.
- Gareth Valentine, born 1956, composer, arranger, conductor and musical director known for his works on musical productions in London's West End.
- Neco Williams, born 2001, professional footballer for Nottingham Forest and the Wales national football team.

== Leisure and education ==
Tŷ Mawr Country Park is located in the area, and features the Cefn Viaduct, built by Thomas Brassey in 1848 to carry the Shrewsbury and Chester Railway across the valley of the River Dee. The village has two primary schools: an English, Cefn Mawr County Primary School, and a Welsh, Ysgol Min Y Ddol. There is also a public library.

The community has three football teams: Cefn Druids, Cefn Albion and Cefn Mawr Rangers F.C.
