= Whitehurst Halt railway station =

Former railway station in Wales

Whitehurst Halt

General information
- Location: Whitehurst, Wrexham; Wales
- Coordinates: 52.9537°N 3.0633°W
- Grid reference: SJ285401
- Platforms: 2

Other information
- Status: Disused

History
- Original company: Shrewsbury, Oswestry and Chester Junction Railway
- Pre-grouping: Great Western Railway

Key dates
- 12 October 1848: Opened as Llangollen Road
- 1 July 1862: Closed
- 1 October 1905: Reopened as Llangollen Road Halt
- 1 May 1906: Renamed Whitehurst Halt
- 12 September 1960: Closed
Location

Whitehurst Halt was a small railway station located on the Shrewsbury to Chester Line about a mile and a half north of Chirk in Wales, immediately on the north side of the 46-yard Whitehurst Tunnel. It was opened by the Great Western Railway as Llangollen Road Halt and the name was changed on 1 May 1906.

Preceding station	Historical railways	Following station
Chirk	Great Western Railway; Shrewsbury to Chester Line	Cefn
