= Newbridge Lodge =

Grade I listed house in Wrexham County Borough, Wales

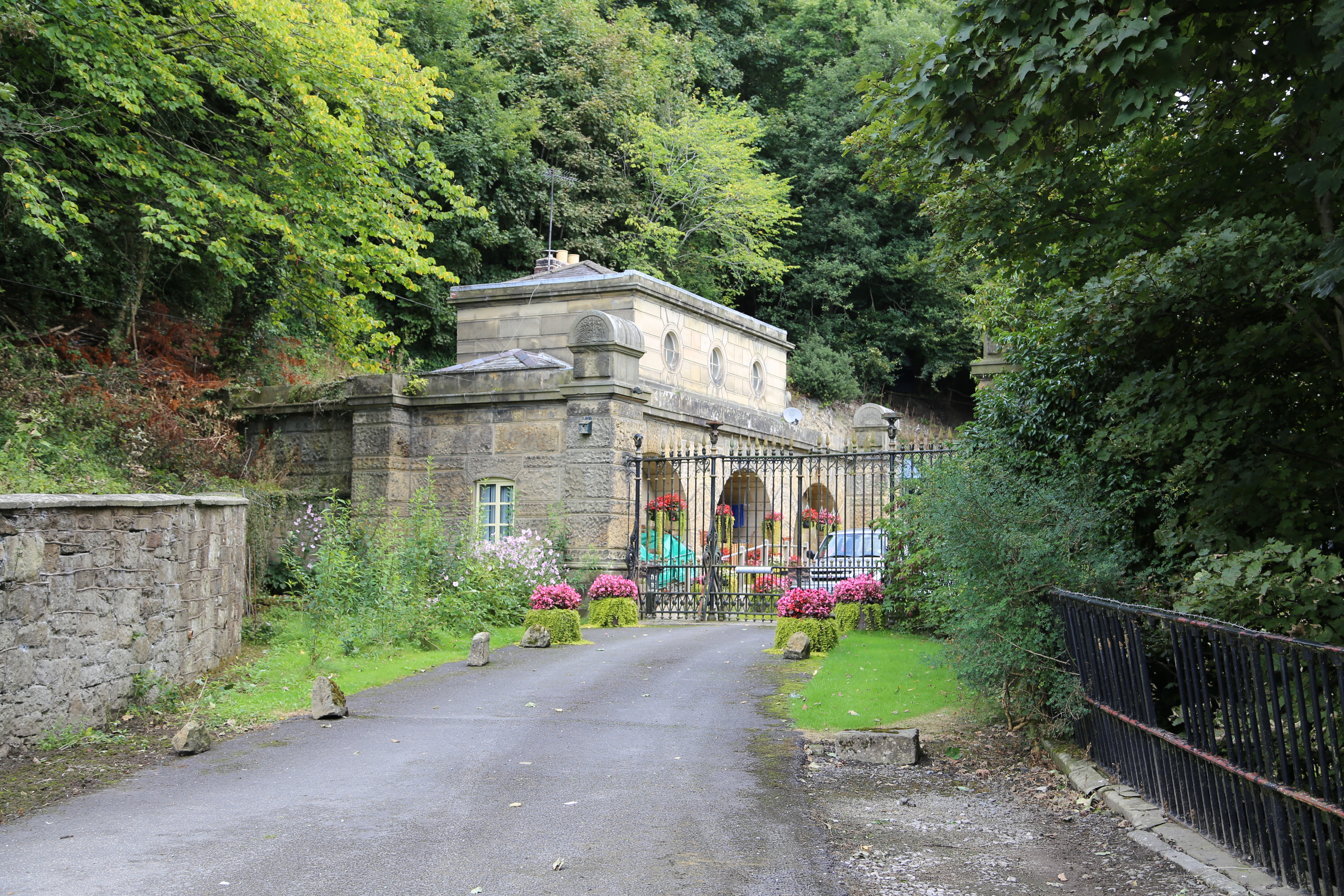
- "brilliant originality"

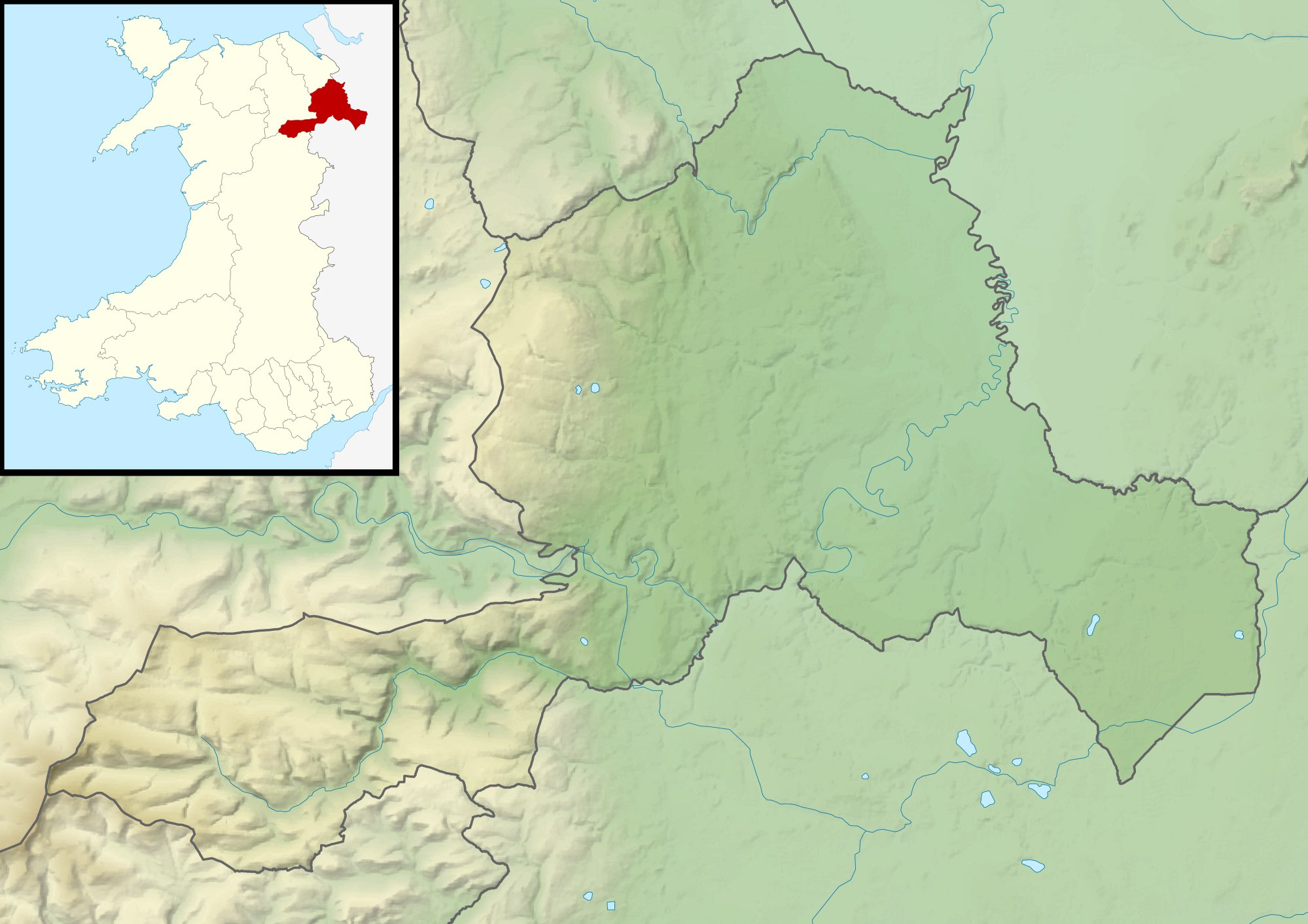
- Location within Wrexham
- 52.9691°N 3.0628°W
- Type: House
- Location: Newbridge, Wrexham County Borough

History
- Built: 1827–1828

Site notes
- Architect: Charles Robert Cockerell
- Architectural style: Neoclassical
- Owner: Privately owned

Listed Building – Grade I
- Official name: Newbridge Lodge
- Designated: 23 August 1955
- Reference no.: 16872

Listed Building – Grade I
- Official name: Entrance gates and railings at Newbridge Lodge
- Designated: 23 August 1955
- Reference no.: 16873

Newbridge Lodge is a gatehouse to the Wynnstay estate near Ruabon, in Wrexham County Borough, North Wales. Designed by Charles Robert Cockerell in 1827–1828 for Sir Watkin Williams-Wynn, 5th Baronet, it is a Grade I listed building. Its gates and railings have a separate Grade I listing.

== History and description ==
The Williams-Wynn baronets of Wynnstay Hall were, in the 18th and 19th centuries, "the richest, most powerful and most profusely hospitable" family in North Wales. Their Wynnstay estate saw extensive development; firstly by the 3rd baronet, who engaged Francis Smith of Warwick in the mid-18th century, and subsequently by the 4th and 5th baronets. The 5th baronet commissioned Charles Robert Cockerell to undertake work at the hall, and also to construct the Newbridge Lodge, purportedly in anticipation of a Royal visit which did not, in fact, occur. (Note: Wynnstay Hall was very badly damaged by a fire in the 1850s and almost completely rebuilt in a French Renaissance revival style by Benjamin Ferrey. Edward Hubbard was not overly impressed, describing Ferrey's rebuilding as having, "much of the coarseness and little of the gusto associated with the genre.")

Edward Hubbard, in his Clwyd volume in the Pevsner Buildings of Wales series, applauds the "brilliant originality" of Cockerell's design. (Note: The Royal Institute of British Architects library holds a design, dated 1827, that has similarities to the Newbridge Lodge.) The lodge is of two storeys, the lower floor with an arcaded and rusticated loggia. The construction material is local ashlar. The lodge is set back from the road and enclosed by a set of elaborate gates with railings. Both the lodge and the gates are Grade I listed buildings, the Cadw listing record describing them as "one of the finest lodge designs of its period in Britain."

== Sources ==
- Hubbard, Edward (2003). Clwyd (Denbighshire and Flintshire). The Buildings of Wales. New Haven and London: Yale University Press. ISBN 978-0-300-09627-9. OCLC 315792534.
