= Newbridge, Wrexham =

Village in Wrexham County Borough, Wales

Coordinates: 52.967966°N 3.063582°W

Newbridge
- Village
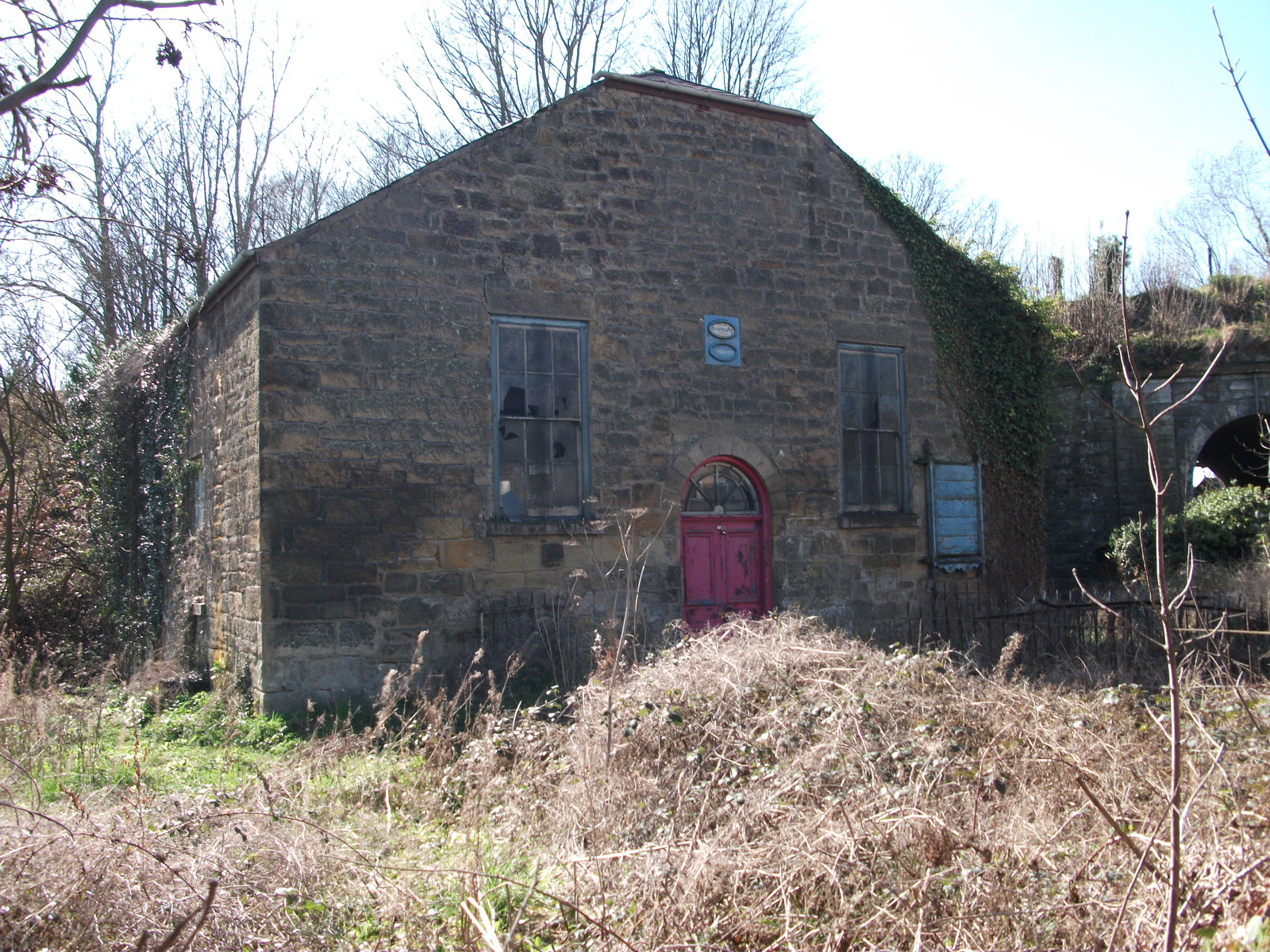
- Derelict Baptist Chapel in the village.

- Location within Wrexham
- OS grid reference: SJ 2866 4170
- Community: Cefn
- Principal area: Wrexham
- Preserved county: Clwyd
- Country: Wales
- Sovereign state: United Kingdom
- Post town: WREXHAM
- Postcode district: LL14
- Dialling code: 01978
- Police: North Wales
- Fire: North Wales
- Ambulance: Welsh
- UK Parliament: Clwyd South
- Senedd Cymru – Welsh Parliament: Clwyd South

Newbridge is a village in Wrexham County Borough, Wales. The village is within the community of Cefn, to the south-east of Cefn Mawr. Newbridge is bounded to the west by the Shrewsbury–Chester railway line and the Newbridge Railway Viaduct which crosses the River Dee, which meanders to the south and east of the village. The Clwydian Range and Dee Valley AONB since 2011 borders the village to the south, as does the Wynnstay estate, and Tŷ Mawr Country Park is on the other side of the viaduct to the west.

== Description ==
Newbridge is named after the arched bridge crossing the Dee in the village, present since at least 1478, connecting Plas Offa north to Ruabon. The bridge is part of the B5605 Newbridge Road.

Its location next to the river, has historically allowed for a rolling mill to be present in the area of the modern-day village in 1808 and a furnace by 1820 to power the production of wrought iron obtained in the Cefn Mawr area. The Pen y Bont brick and tile works, established in about 1865, were located to the south-east on the opposite bank of the river, near the village. In 1965, it was recorded that stone-built dwellings in the village were pulled down to be replaced by bungalows. Some of the original stone-built dwellings were later modified to integrate brick into their designs. There was a pub known as the Black Lion on Park Road in the village, dating to 1810.

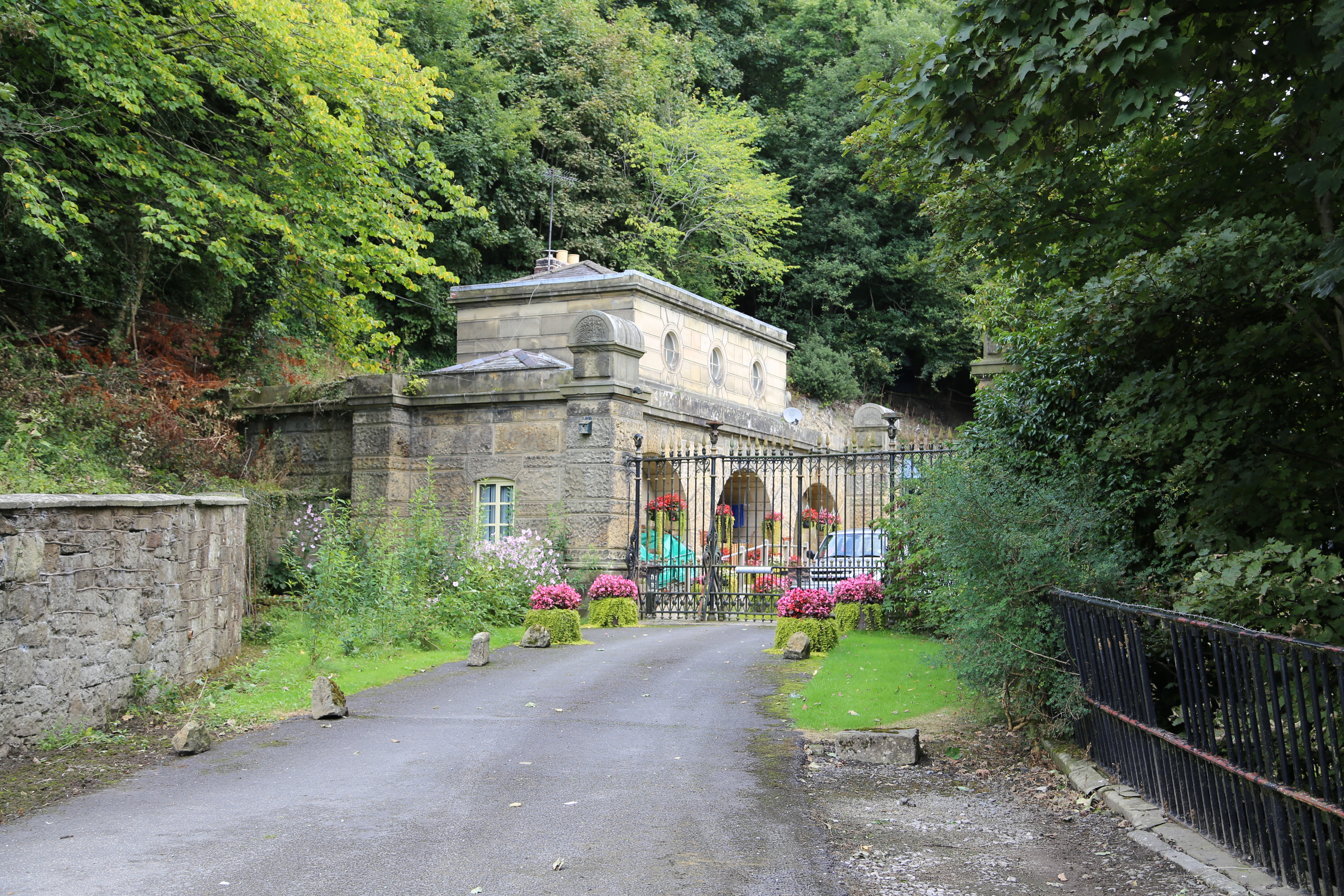
Newbridge Lodge to the north of the village.

Newbridge Lodge, a Grade I listed building is situated to the north of the village.

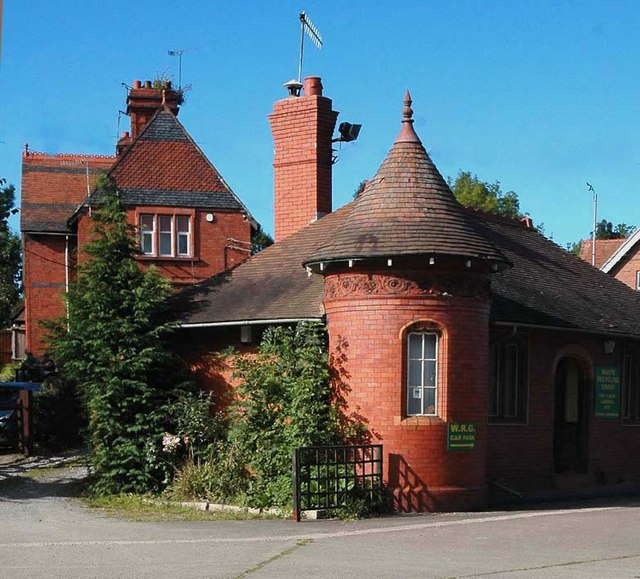
Brick building at Pen-y-bont works to the south-east of the village.

The earliest date for Newbridge Chapel located in the village is 1825 which indicates that the settlement was "well established" by then, but it was not until later in the nineteenth-century that there were houses interspersed both along the main road and on the back lanes of the village. Development in the area later shifted away from the village by the mid-nineteenth century, leaving the village with a "characteristically haphazard pattern".

In 2016, the Newbridge Arms pub, located to the north of the village, renamed itself "Pubby McPubface" based on the Boaty McBoatface internet naming poll of RRS Sir David Attenborough.

Since January 2021 following Storm Christoph, part of the B5605 Newbridge Road between the village and Cefn Mawr has been damaged due to a landslide. Part of the road's pavement collapsed down an embankment following flooding. The lack of progress of the road's repair for over a year has been criticised by local residents and politicians. Wrexham County Borough Council applied for Welsh Government funding for the repair, but the government rejected the application in June 2021 as it did not meet the "relevant criteria". A new business case for repair was submitted by the council to the government in February 2022, and in April 2022, the government awarded the council £2.8 million to repair the road. The road serves as an important alternative diversion route should the A5 and A483 viaducts be closed at the same time due to windy conditions.
