= Cefn Viaduct, Wrexham =

Railway viaduct in Wrexham County Borough, Wales

Cefn (Newbridge) Viaduct
- Traphont Cefn (Newbridge) (Welsh)
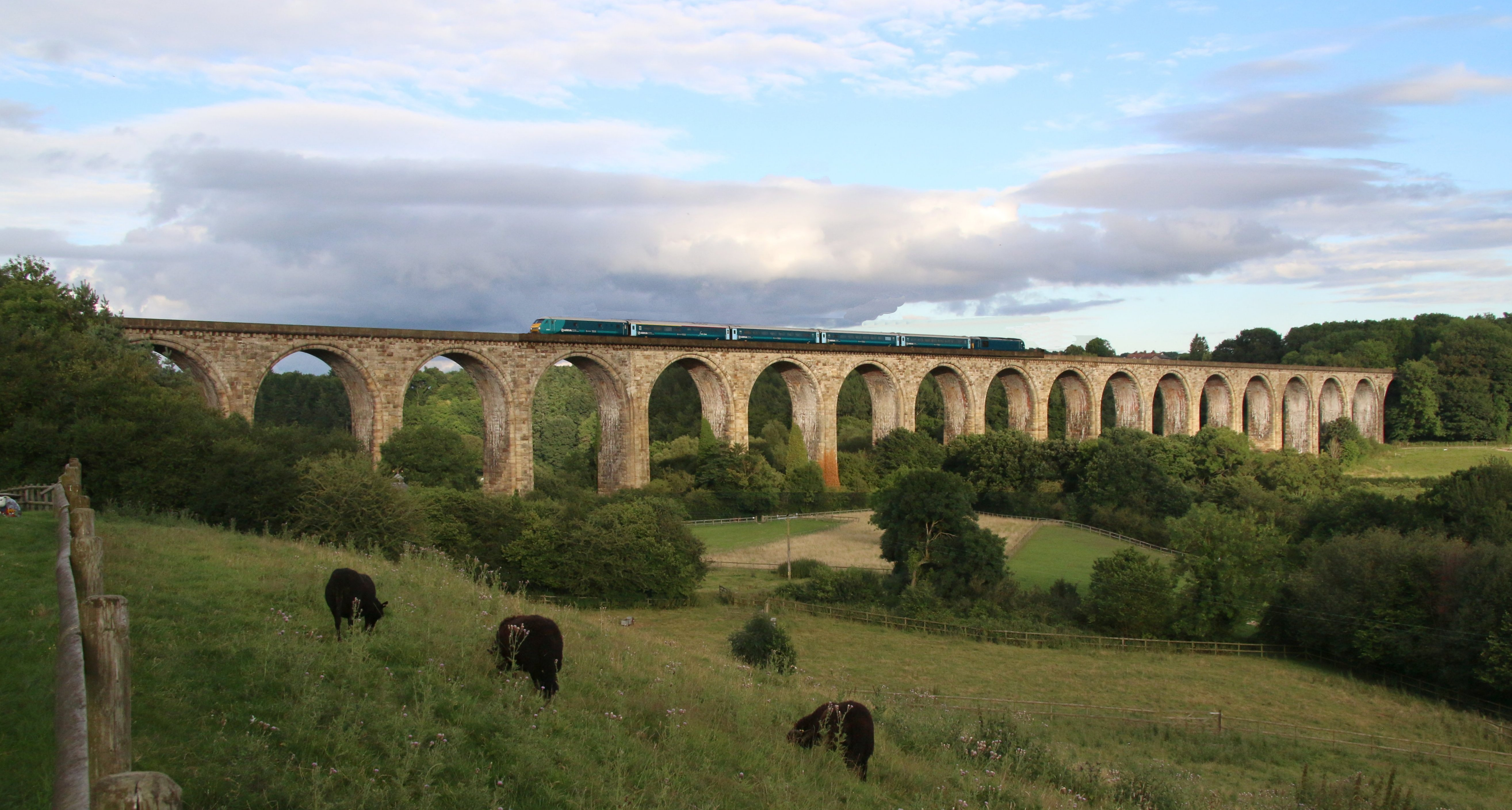
- The viaduct with an Arriva Trains Wales Premier Service
- Interactive map of Cefn (Newbridge) Viaduct
- 52.96337°N 3.06538°W
- Location: Cefn and Chirk, Wrexham, Wales
- Nearest city: Wrexham

History
- Built: 1848
- Built for: Shrewsbury and Chester Railway

Site notes
- Height: 44.8 metres (147 ft)
- Architect: Henry Robertson
- Current use: Railway viaduct

Listed Building – Grade II*
- Official name: Cefn (Newbridge) Viaduct (partly in Cefn Community); Railway Viaduct over River Dee
- Designated: 4 January 1966; Amended 29 July 1998 and 30 April 1996
- Reference no.: 628 and 619 (dual-listed)

The Cefn (Newbridge) Viaduct (Note: also known as the Cefn Mawr Viaduct, Cefn-bychan Viaduct, Dee Railway Viaduct, Newbridge (Railway) Viaduct or simply the Cefn Viaduct; Welsh: Traphont Cefn) is Grade II* listed railway viaduct across the River Dee between Cefn and Chirk communities in Wrexham County Borough, Wales. The viaduct is near the villages of Cefn Mawr (and Cefn-bychan), Pentre and Newbridge. The viaduct forms the eastern boundary of Tŷ Mawr Country Park and is around a mile downstream of Pontcysyllte Aqueduct.

== Naming ==
The viaduct is listed by Cadw as the "Cefn (Newbridge) Viaduct" and "Railway Viaduct over River Dee". There are other names for the structure, named based on either the surrounding features or simply shortened to Cefn Viaduct. The viaduct is also named after the surrounding places such the Cefn Mawr Viaduct, Cefn-bychan Viaduct, Newbridge (Railway) Viaduct or Dee Railway Viaduct.

== Description ==
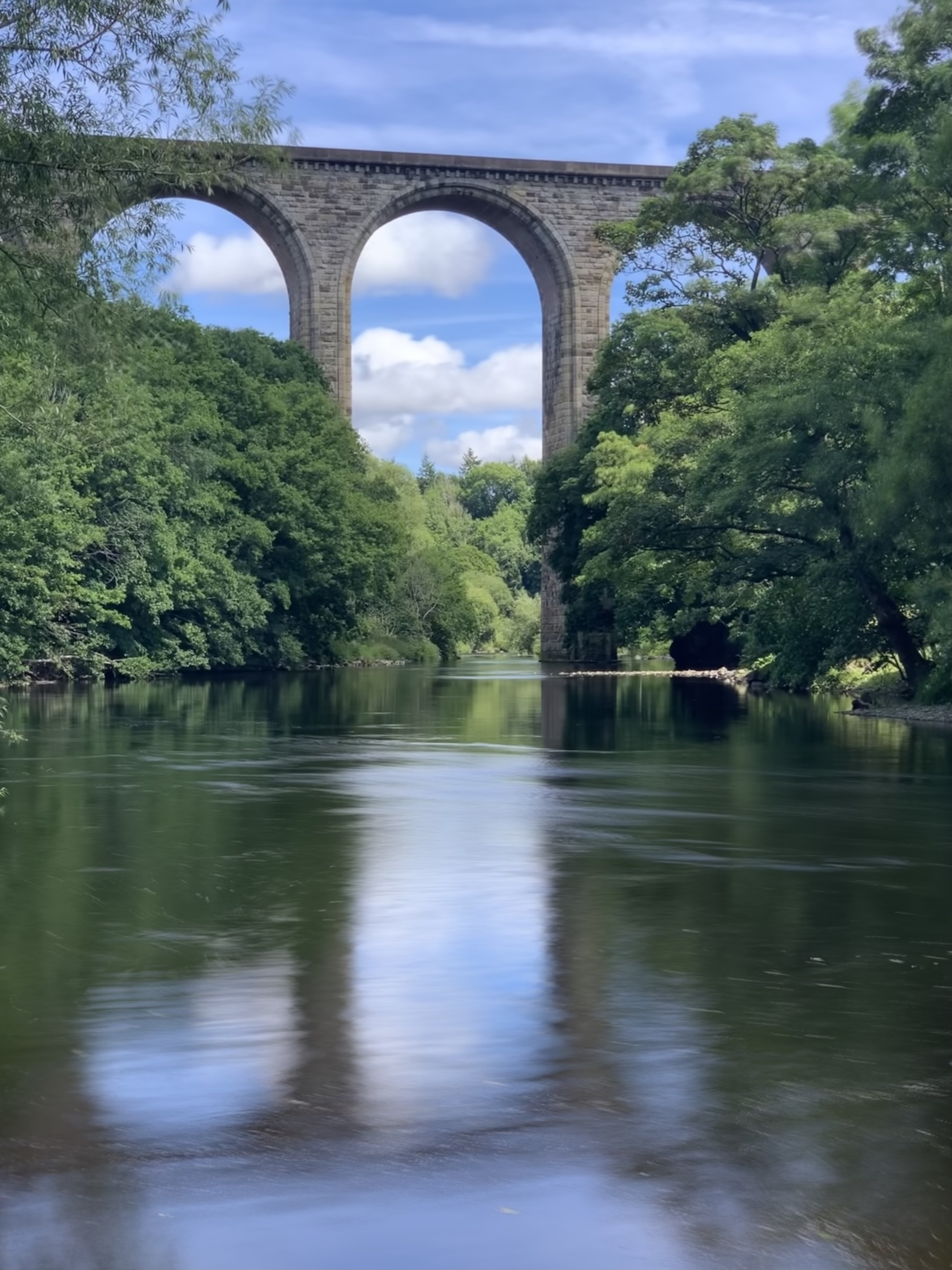
The viaduct from the River Dee

The viaduct was designed by Henry Robertson, chief engineer of the Shrewsbury and Chester Railway, to carry the railway line across the River Dee between Newbridge and Cefn-bychan. Building commenced in 1846, with Thomas Brassey as the general contractor. It was completed on 14 August 1848, with the ceremony of keying the viaduct's last stone performed by William Ormsby Gore, and opened for service in October 1848. The cost of construction was £72,346 in 1848, equivalent to £6,010,000 in 2021. The entire railway line was initiated by Robertson, who had received training from George Stephenson, and recognised that the existing canal network was not meeting the material transport needs between Wrexham and Chester. By 1845, rival schemes were proposed to link Chester and Shrewsbury via Ruabon, with Robertson stating to a parliamentary committee that the railway line would open the coalfields at Ruabon and Wrexham to markets in Chester, Birkenhead and Liverpool. The line became part of the Great Western Railway (GWR) system in 1854, but was not converted to broad gauge as part of GWR. Tŷ Mawr Country Park is immediately west of the viaduct.

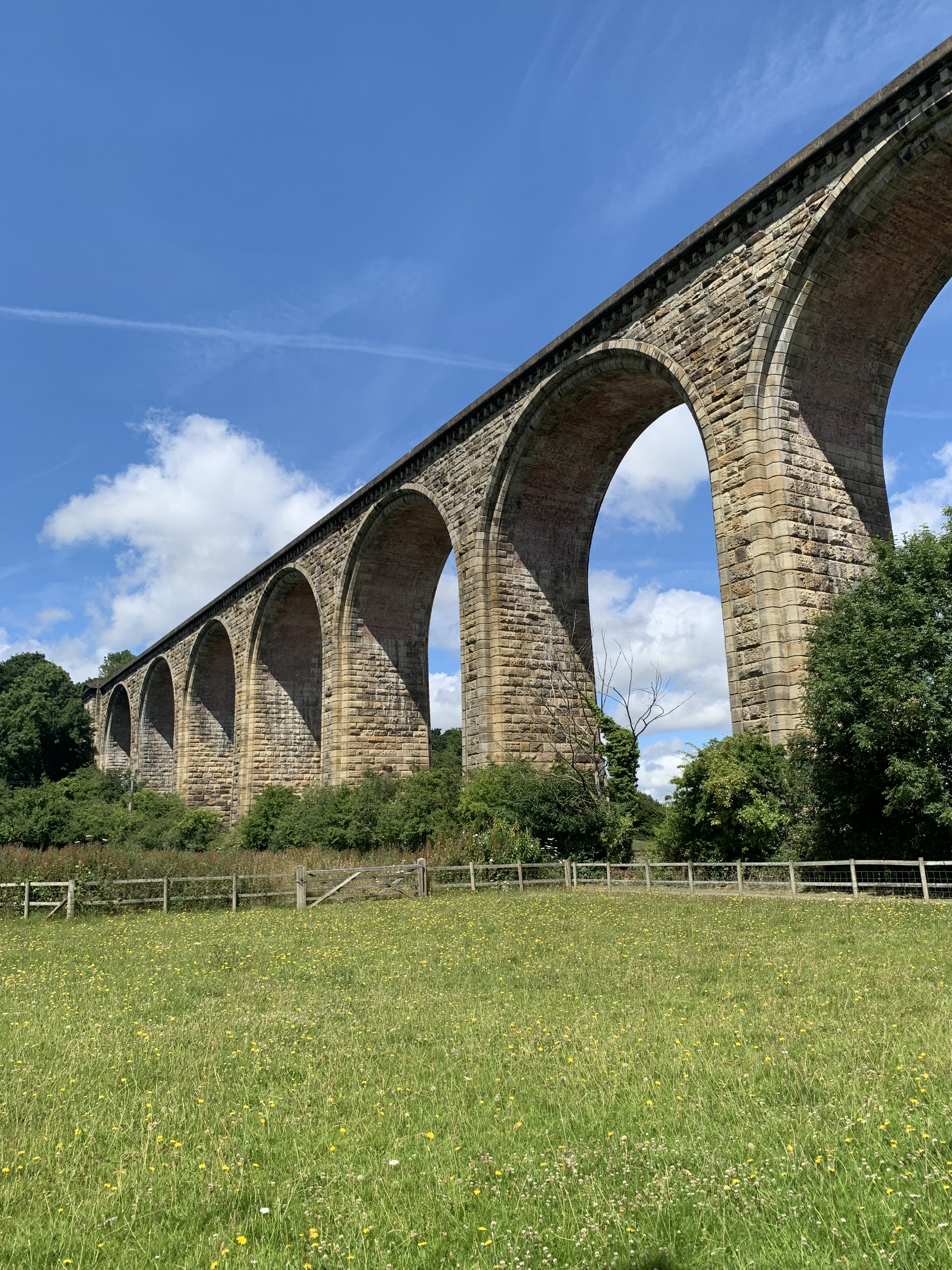
The viaduct's structure from ground level

=== Design ===
The viaduct is built of coursed squared Cefn sandstone from Chatham's Quarry, with the upper arched stage of brick faced with stone. It is 460 m (1,510 ft) long, comprising 19 arches of 18.2 m (60 ft) span, and two arches of 9 m (30 ft), and rising 44.8 m (147 ft) above the river. At the time of opening it was claimed to be the longest viaduct in Britain.

It is listed as a Grade II* building because of the structure's "highly impressive and architecturally elegant example of mid 19th century railway engineering".

== 1928 rail crash ==
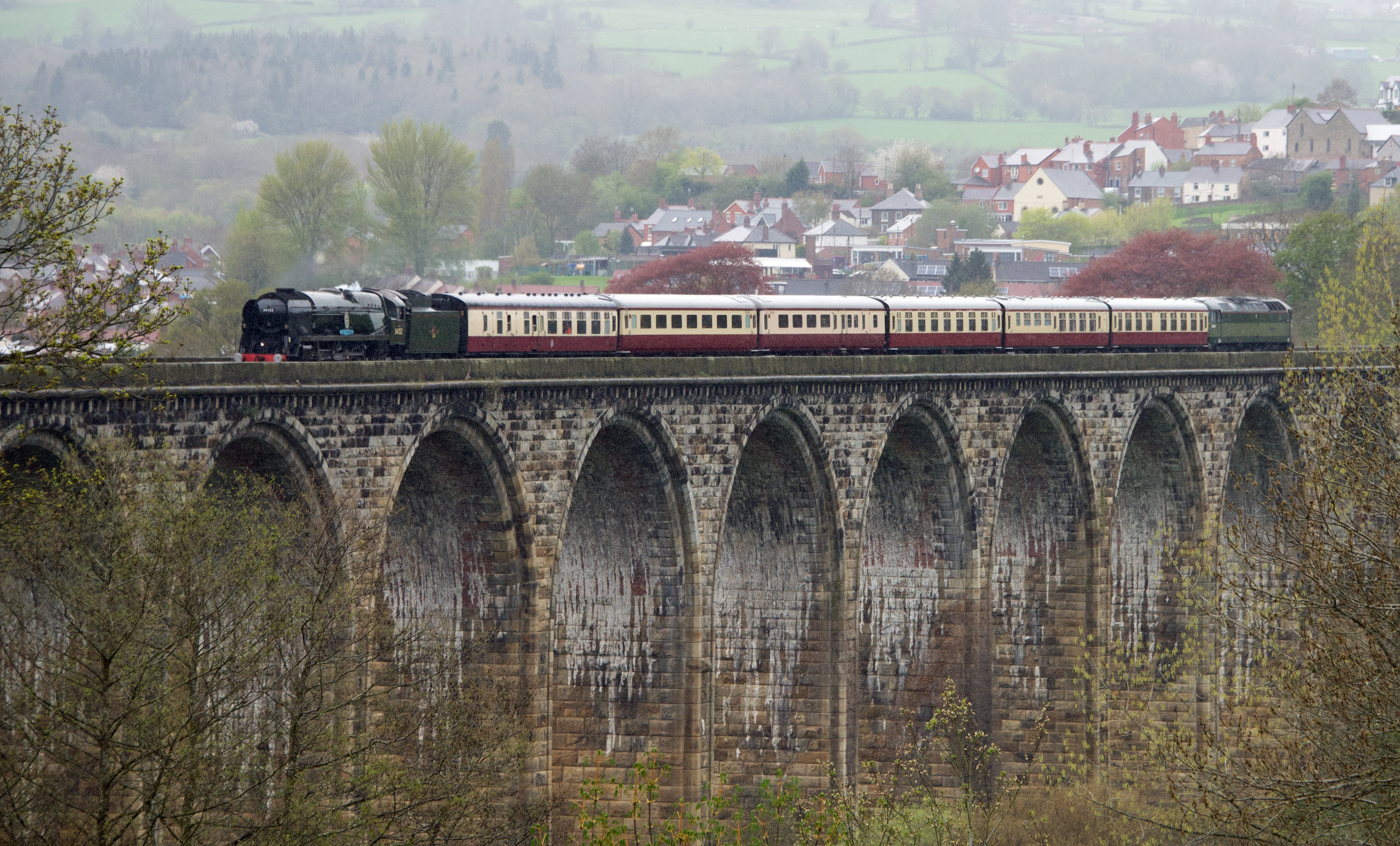
Steam locomotive passenger service on the viaduct

On 25 January 1928 at 4:05 a.m., two freight trains collided on the viaduct. A 3.30 a.m. Oswestry to Birkenhead 26-wagon freight train suffered engine failure on the viaduct caused by a missing cotter, and driver Johnson decided to stop on the viaduct for inspection and repair. While the train was stationary on the viaduct, the approaching 12.45 a.m. Wolverhampton (Oxley) to Birkenhead 47-wagon freight train crashed into the rear of the stationary Oswestry train after being previously signalled for clear passage on the viaduct. Some personnel on board the trains were injured: the Oswestry guard suffered injuries and burns, the Oswestry driver and Oxley guard were slightly injured, and the Oxley driver and fireman suffered from shock. The Oxley train's wheels and three wagons were derailed and damaged, five wagons of the Oswestry train were completely wrecked, and the guard's van and some other wagons of the Oswestry train caught fire. Before the accident, signalman Edwards of the Llangollen Junction signal box was contacted by Richards, signalman of Black Park, at 4.01 a.m. asking whether the Oswestry train had passed out of section. It had passed Black Park at 3.50 a.m. The usual journey time between Llangollen Junction and Black Park was nine minutes, and Richards was aware of the approaching Oxley train. Edwards did not reply to Richards, and assumed the Oswestry train had passed him and he had forgotten to clear it, so he signalled "Train out of Section" to Black Park. Richards immediately asked for "Line Clear" for the approaching Oxley train, which Edwards accepted at 4.02 a.m. After passing through a bend, the Oxley train travelled at 30–35 mph (48–56 km/h) down a slight gradient, when driver Hopkins saw the Oswestry train's tail lamps on the viaduct. Hopkins immediately cut off steam and applied the brakes, throwing on-board guard Williams to the floor, but he was unable to stop the train fully; it was still moving at about 10 mph (16 km/h) when it crashed into the Oswestry train.

The line was blocked for almost 14 hours after the incident.

== See also ==
- Chirk Viaduct
