= Cefn, Wrexham =

Community in Wrexham County Borough, Wales

Cefn
- Community
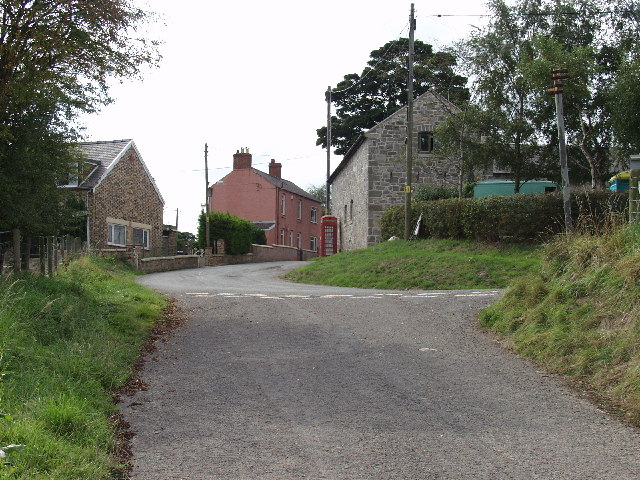
- Penybryn, a hamlet in the rural part of Cefn, on the slopes of the Ruabon Moors.
- Principal area: Wrexham
- Country: Wales
- Sovereign state: United Kingdom
- Ambulance: Welsh
- List of places UK Wales Map of the community

Cefn (Welsh for 'ridge') is a community in Wrexham County Borough, Wales. The community of Cefn includes the villages of Cefn Mawr, Cefn Bychan, Acrefair, Penybryn, Newbridge, Plas Madoc and Rhosymedre and is situated on the northern slopes of the Dee Valley. As well as the former industrial villages around Acrefair, it also includes some rural areas to the north on the slopes of Ruabon Moors. At the time of the 2001 census, it had a total population of 6,669 in 2,763 households, increasing to 7,051 at the 2011 Census.

The area formerly comprised the townships of Coed Cristionydd and Cristionydd Cynrig (or Cristionydd Kenrick), which became part of the parish of Ruabon. Parts of the townships were formed into the new parish of Rhosymedre in 1844. The corresponding civil parish of Cefn Mawr was formed into the community of Cefn in 1974, under the terms of the Local Government Act 1972.

== Governance ==
An electoral ward in the same name exists. This ward does not cover all the Community and at the 2011 Census had a population of 5,074.
