= Shrewsbury and Chester Railway =

Former railway company

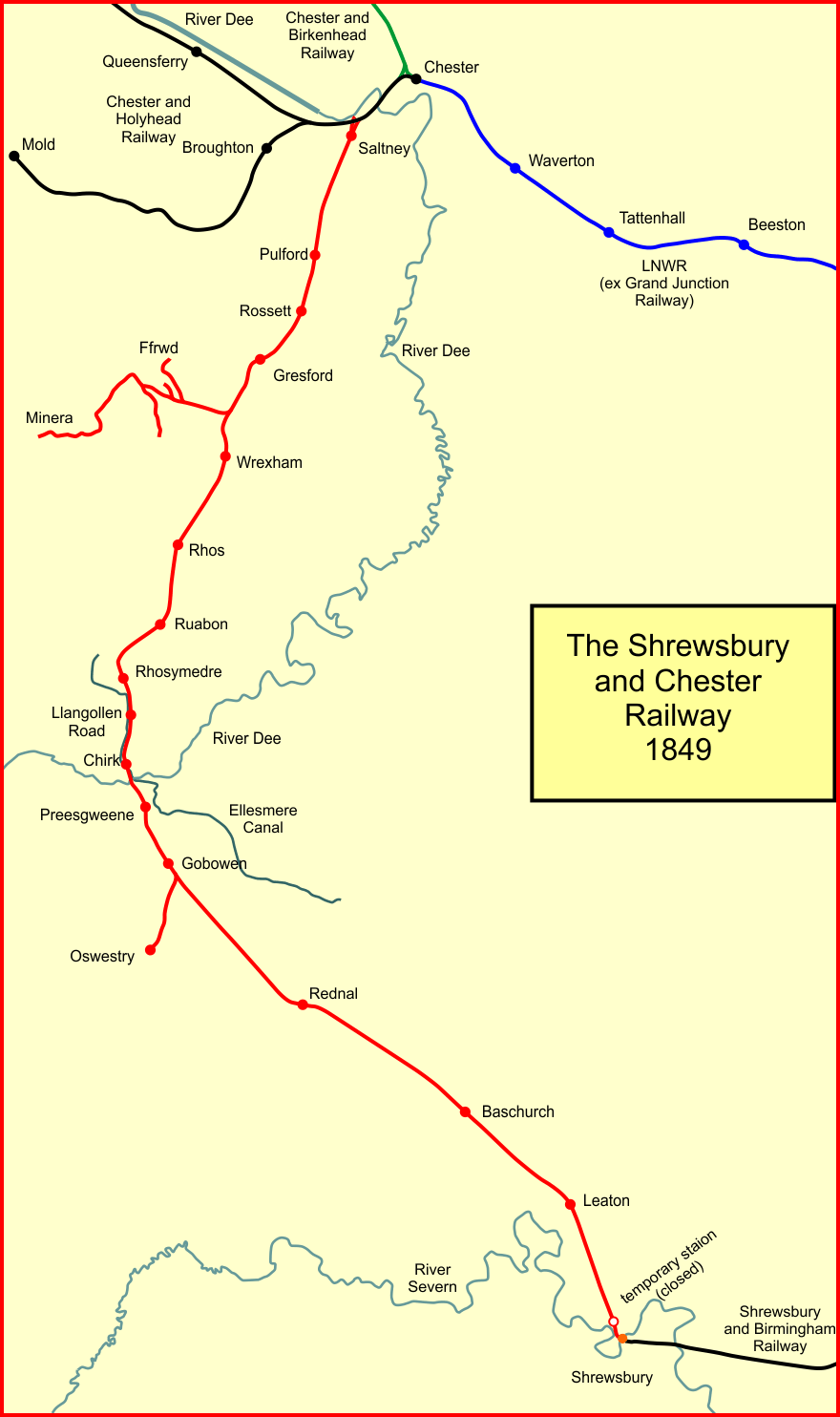
The Shrewsbury and Chester Railway in 1849

The North Wales Mineral Railway was formed to carry coal and ironstone from the mineral-bearing area around Wrexham to the River Dee wharves. It was extended to run from Shrewsbury and formed part of a main line trunk route, under the title the Shrewsbury and Chester Railway. It opened in 1846 from Chester to Ruabon, and in 1848 from Ruabon to Shrewsbury. It later merged with the Great Western Railway.

Much of its main line ran through rural areas, but the important mineral area west of Wrexham, and also near Ruabon, led to considerable development of mineral business. A dense network of branches to access pits and ironworks built up, although the hilly terrain made railway construction difficult. At the end of the nineteenth century, passenger services were put on for the mining communities.

The main line business developed too, enabling the GWR to access the Mersey, from London and from South Wales, and a heavy long-distance mineral flow built up. That traffic dwindled steeply in the 1930s; the main line suffered from the handicap of reaching the west bank of the Mersey, and later it was reduced to the status of a secondary route. The original main line remains open.

== North Wales Mineral Railway ==
North Wales Mineral Railway Act 1844
- Act of Parliament
- Parliament of the United Kingdom
- Long title: An Act for making a Railway from the River Dee in the County of the City of Chester to Wrexham in the County of Denbigh, to be called "The North Wales Mineral Railway."
- Citation: 7 & 8 Vict. c. xcix

Dates
- Royal assent: 6 August 1844

North Wales Mineral Railway Extension Act 1845
- Act of Parliament
- Parliament of the United Kingdom
- Long title: An Act to authorize the North Wales Mineral Railway Company to extend their Line to Ruabon, and to make a Branch Railway from Rhos Robin to Minera, and to raise additional Capital for those Purposes.
- Citation: 8 & 9 Vict. c. cxv

Dates
- Royal assent: 21 July 1845

North Wales Mineral Railway Deviation and Branches Act 1846
- Act of Parliament
- Parliament of the United Kingdom
- Long title: An Act to authorize the North Wales Mineral Railway Company to make certain Branches, and also to make a Deviation in their present Line of Railway.
- Citation: 9 & 10 Vict. c. ccl

Dates
- Royal assent: 27 July 1846

The North Wales Mineral Railway gained royal assent in 1844, during the early years of the Railway Mania.

The Chester and Holyhead Railway was being promoted from 1836, and more actively from 1840, and the idea of a railway feeder to that line arose. This was promoted locally, titled the North Wales Mineral Railway. As indicated by the name, it was intended to tap the mineral reserves of the area. The North Wales Coalfield runs from near Talacre at the mouth of the River Dee through Wrexham to Oswestry. The coal and associated iron industries became particularly active from the early eighteenth century, but poor transport links to markets suppressed the potential of the trade.

At first it was to include branches to coal pits and iron works, but these were dropped due to local opposition. The revised scheme was authorised by the North Wales Mineral Railway Act 1844 (7 & 8 Vict. c. xcix) on 6 August 1844. It was to run from Wrexham to a wharf at Saltney, and a connection at the latter place to the Chester and Holyhead Railway, which had gained its authorisation a month earlier in the same session.

In the following parliamentary session, authorisation was granted on 21 July 1845 by the North Wales Mineral Railway Extension Act 1845 (8 & 9 Vict. c. cxv) to extend the line south from Wrexham to Ruabon. To get better access to the pits, it was to include a branch from a junction at Wheatsheaf, a little north of Wrexham, to Brymbo and Minera, via a tunnel and inclined plane.

Further powers were taken the following year in the North Wales Mineral Railway Deviation and Branches Act 1846 (9 & 10 Vict. c. ccl), authorised 27 July 1846, for short stubs to access collieries at Ffrwd, Brynmally, Brymbo and Vron.

== Shrewsbury, Oswestry and Chester Railway ==
Shrewsbury, Oswestry and Chester Junction Railway Act 1845
- Act of Parliament
- Parliament of the United Kingdom
- Long title: An Act for making a Railway from Shrewsbury in the County of Salop to Ruabon in the County of Denbigh, to be called "The Shrewsbury, Oswestry, and Chester Junction Railway."
- Citation: 8 & 9 Vict. c. xlii

Dates
- Royal assent: 30 June 1845

With the realisation that it could become part of a through route, the NWMR began to make plans to extend the line southwards to Shrewsbury.

The forecast for the main line was disrupted when the Chester and Holyhead Railway (C&HR) proposed its own line south. This arose out of disagreements with the Grand Junction Railway, on which the C&HR would depend for access to London. The C&HR developed proposals for a line from Chester to Shrewsbury (to be called the Cheshire and Shropshire Junction Railway).

Such a railway would hugely reduce the income of the North Wales Mineral Railway, so the NWMR promoted its own route from Ruabon to Shrewsbury, named the Shrewsbury, Oswestry and Chester Junction Railway. It was this line that was authorised by the Shrewsbury, Oswestry and Chester Junction Railway Act 1845 (8 & 9 Vict. c. xlii), on 30 June 1845, unopposed in Parliament, and the CHR scheme was turned down.

== Shrewsbury and Chester Railway formed ==
Shrewsbury and Chester Railway Act 1846
- Act of Parliament
- Parliament of the United Kingdom
- Long title: An Act for the Consolidation of the Shrewsbury, Oswestry, and Chester Junction and the North Wales Mineral Railway Companies.
- Citation: 9 & 10 Vict. c. ccli

Dates
- Royal assent: 27 July 1846

The North Wales Mineral Railway (NWMR) and the Shrewsbury, Oswestry and Chester Railway (SO&CR) were allies, and their strength was in the end-to-end route. It made sense to combine formally, and on 27 July 1846 the Shrewsbury and Chester Railway was created by the Shrewsbury and Chester Railway Act 1846 (9 & 10 Vict. c. ccli).

Shrewsbury, Oswestry and Chester Railway (Crickheath and Wem Branches) Act 1846
- Act of Parliament
- Parliament of the United Kingdom
- Long title: An Act to authorize the Shrewsbury, Oswestry, and Chester Junction Railway Company to make Railways to Crickheath and Wem, and to raise additional Capital for those Purposes.
- Citation: 9 & 10 Vict. c. cclxxiv

Dates
- Royal assent: 27 July 1846

On the same day that royal assent was given to the Shrewsbury, Oswestry and Chester Railway (Crickheath and Wem Branches) Act 1846 (9 & 10 Vict. c. cclxxiv) containing proposals for a branch from Leaton to Wem, and from Gobowen via Oswestry to Crickheath (four miles south of Oswestry, to join a proposed Shropshire Union Railway branch there). The plans for the SO&CR had been prepared hastily, and included an independent station at Shrewsbury. Negotiations with the promoters of other lines resulted in agreement for a joint station near the centre. The extension to this station was authorised in the Shrewsbury and Chester Railway Act 1846; the joint station there was to be used also by the Shropshire Union Railway, the Shrewsbury and Hereford Railway, the Shrewsbury and Birmingham Railway.

The former NWMR main line from Ruabon (actually Rhosymedre, a little to the south) to Saltney, 15 miles, opened on 2 or 4 November 1846; the section of the Chester and Holyhead Railway (C&HR) from Saltney into Chester opened on the same day, worked temporarily by the Shrewsbury and Chester Railway (S&CR) as the C&HR was not yet operational. There were five passenger trains each way daily.

The Minera branch, with two rope-worked inclines and two tunnels, opened in July 1847, and two subsidiary branches off that line, to Ffrwd and Brynmally collieries opened in November 1847.

The SO&CR main line of 25 miles opened from Ruabon to a temporary terminus at Shrewsbury on 14 or 16 October 1848; the extension to the new joint station was opened on 1 June 1849. This was the first railway to enter Shrewsbury. There were two remarkable viaducts on the section between Ruabon and Shrewsbury, at Cefn over the Dee, and at Chirk over the River Ceiriog. The Dee viaduct is 510 yards in length, and was the largest in the country at the time of construction.

Chester was promised a joint station by the Shrewsbury and Chester Railway Act 1847 (10 & 11 Vict. c. ccliv) of 9 July 1847, to be used by S&CR, C&HR and LNWR trains; it opened on 1 August 1848. The Wem branch authorised in 1846 was never built, and the Crickheath branch was cut back to Oswestry from Gobowen; it opened on 23 December 1848.

== Dee Bridge failure ==
The Shrewsbury and Chester Railway (S&CR) used a section of the Chester and Holyhead Railway (C&HR) to reach Chester itself. On 24 May 1847 a bridge on that railway over the River Dee not far from Chester failed, and six persons were killed. The C&HR arranged for the bridge to be strengthened, and invited the S&CR to resume normal operation, but the S&CR waited for a Board of Trade inspection of the work; S&CR trains resumed operation over the strengthened bridge from 26 July.

== Shrewsbury and Birmingham Railway ==
The London and Birmingham Railway (L&BR) had encouraged the formation of the Shrewsbury and Chester Railway (S&CR), but the L&BR itself merged with the Grand Junction Railway, forming the London and North Western Railway (LNWR) in July 1846. Now the LNWR viewed the S&CR as an abstracter of business: with the Shrewsbury and Birmingham Railway it would compete with the LNWR for traffic between the Mersey and London. However the Great Western Railway was building its line to Birmingham, so that an alignment with the Great Western Railway would benefit the S&CR; equally the LNWR would oppose any such linkage.

The Shrewsbury and Birmingham Railway (S&BR) had been authorised in 1846, though the section south of Wolverhampton to Birmingham was omitted, in favour of the Stour Valley Line. A Birkenhead, Lancashire and Cheshire Junction Railway had opened in 1840, between Birkenhead and Chester, and the Shrewsbury railways (S&BR and S&CR) allied with it, achieving a through route from Birkenhead to Birmingham. The docks at Birkenhead, with the access to Liverpool, formed a key location at the time.

== Conflict with the LNWR ==
The London and North Western Railway (LNWR) chairman, Mark Huish, was accustomed to aggressive business tactics, and prohibited the sale of tickets to Wolverhampton from Chester station, and had Shrewsbury and Chester Railway (S&CR) and Birkenhead, Lancashire and Cheshire Junction Railway (BL&CJR) publicity defaced, and banned omnibuses put on to by-pass the obstruction. The BL&CJR board was intimidated by the LNWR action and at first submitted to the pressure; but in 1850 its shareholders protested at the loss of business, and co-operation with the S&CR was resumed. (The shareholders had discovered that three times as much traffic was being received from the Shrewsbury line as from the LNWR.

Shrewsbury and Chester Railway (Birkenhead Station) Act 1851
- Act of Parliament
- Parliament of the United Kingdom
- Long title: An Act to authorize the Shrewsbury and Chester Railway Company to abandon the Crickheath and Wem Branches, to construct a Station at Birkenhead, to enter into Arrangements with other Companies, and for other Purposes.
- Citation: 14 & 15 Vict. c. cxxxi

Dates
- Royal assent: 7 August 1851

In January 1851 the S&BR and the S&CR formed a traffic agreement with the GWR. The LNWR retaliated with a series of extremely improper business practices, including the forging of a traffic agreement using a false company seal. The S&CR obtained running powers over the whole of the Birkenhead line, enshrined in the Shrewsbury and Chester Railway (Birkenhead Station) Act 1851 (14 & 15 Vict. c. cxxxi), and the S&BR and the S&CR decided to merge with the GWR. At first this was refused by Parliament; the collaborative grouping continued nevertheless, and become known as “the Associated Companies”.

== Merging with the Great Western Railway ==
The amalgamation with the Great Western Railway (GWR) was again proposed, and it was approved by the Great Western, Birmingham and Chester Railways Act 1854 (17 & 18 Vict. c. ccxxii) to take place on 1 September 1854; in the process the new (expanded) GWR acquired its first 'narrow' (standard) gauge locomotives.

The Birkenhead company saw what was inevitable and made a traffic agreement with the GWR, and goods traffic from Birkenhead started on 2 February 1856. A passenger service between Birmingham and Birkenhead started on 1 May 1857. In 1859 the LNWR and the GWR agreed to joint operation of the Birkenhead line, and full joint ownership followed on 20 November 1860, ratified by the Birkenhead Railway (Vesting) Act 1861 (24 & 25 Vict. c. cxxxiv).

In August 1861 the GWR completed the laying of mixed gauge to Paddington, so that narrow gauge trains could run throughout from Birkenhead, and on 1 October 1861 the first narrow gauge through train ran.

For some time the GWR did little to develop long distance passenger traffic; it had the handicap of the long route via Oxford, and of serving Liverpool from the Birkenhead side of the Mersey. Only from 1880 was a fast through train put on, known as the Northern Zulu. From this time the North and West route had trains from Cardiff and the West of England. Goods traffic, more particularly mineral traffic, had long been a much more fruitful business; notwithstanding the existence of the North Wales Coalfield locally, there was a heavy traffic in coal from South Wales to the Wrexham area and Birkenhead for bunkering, and a corresponding southward traffic of iron ore to serve the ironworks of South Wales.

Passenger traffic developed from Birkenhead to GWR destinations, many of them outside London, as the LNWR service from Liverpool was superior. From the late 1890s through trains from Liverpool via the Mersey Railway were begun. In fact the dominant traffic was coal from South Wales to Birkenhead.

== Access to Minera improved ==
The 1847 branch from Wheatsheaf Junction to Minera via Brymbo was difficult to work, having two rope-worked inclines. The Shrewsbury and Chester Railway promoted a new line, the Wrexham and Minera Railway, which obtained royal assent to the Wrexham and Minera Railway Act 1861 (24 & 25 Vict. c. xxxii) on 17 May 1861. It ran by a more southerly route, from a junction south of Wrexham, at Croes Newydd to Brymbo, (Note: It is sometimes asserted that the Wrexham and Minera Railway ran throughout between the points in its name. In fact the western extremity was at Brymbo, where it joined the 1847 Minera branch, which continued in use westward from there.) and it opened on 22 May 1862. The Moss Incline, the rope-worked inclined plane immediately east of Moss on the original Minera branch line was closed.

== Wrexham, Mold and Connah's Quay Railway ==
There was dissatisfaction among industrialists over railway connections out of the area. In time the Wrexham, Mold and Connah’s Quay Railway was authorised on 7 August 1862. It was built from Wrexham to join the Buckley Railway, a former horse tramway that had been upgraded, and together the two short lines gave access to a wharf on the River Dee, and to a connection with the Chester and Holyhead Railway. The line opened on 1 January 1866 for mineral traffic, and for passengers after improvements, on 1 May 1866.

== LNWR branches ==
Since 1805 there had been a horse tramway from the canal at Pontcysyllte to Acrefair village, serving Kynaston colliery and iron works on the way, as well as quarries at Cefn. It was called the Ruabon Brook Tramway, owned by the canal company. It was leased to the London and North Western Railway (LNWR) in 1847, and in 1863 the LNWR converted the line to a locomotive railway, adding numerous short connections to pits and brickworks in the locality.

The LNWR had a branch line to Coed Poeth and Tryddyn. The Wrexham and Minera Extension Railway, from Brymbo to Tryddyn, was authorised in 1865, and the powers were transferred to the LNWR and GWR jointly, and opened in 1872.

== Ponkey branch ==
In 1861 the GWR opened a further branch from a junction just north of Ruabon station to furnaces at Ponciau (Ponkey) and Aberderfyn, opening on 1 August 1861, and on 27 August 1871 it was extended to Legacy Colliery.

== Moss Valley branch ==
The Great Western Railway opened a Moss Valley Branch of 3 miles, authorised by the Great Western Railway Act 1873 (36 & 37 Vict. c. cxc) on 21 July 1873 and opened on 11 May 1881; it ran to Ffrwd Ironworks from a junction with the Wrexham and Minera Railway main line near its origin.

== Passenger operation on the Brymbo lines ==
On the GWR line from Brymbo to Minera, passenger trains started operating as far as Coed Poeth on 15 November 1897, and the passenger service was extended to Berwig in 1905. From this time the motor-train system favoured by the GWR was used: a single coach incorporated a small steam engine; the arrangement was economical on lightly used passenger services, and a number of motor halts were opened to take advantage of the system. The Moss Valley branch received a similar passenger service from 1 May 1905, running from Wrexham as far up the valley as Moss Platform.

== Branch line extensions to Rhos ==
The GWR later obtained authorisation to construct a branch line (the “Rhos” branch) from near Wrexham to Rhos via the site of the closed Legacy Colliery, now Legacy Station, making new connections there with the Ponkey branch and the Plas Madoc branch. This new group of branches opened on 1 October 1901. Railmotors once again enabled a passenger service on local routes where patronage might not be heavy; from 1 May 1905 the passenger service on the Rhos branch was extended further south to Wynn Hall Halt, and from 5 June 1905 southwards from Legacy Station on the Ponkey branch as far as Ponkey Crossing Halt.

== Wrexham station improvements ==
The open cast working to the west of the coalfield declined as the pits became worked out, and increasingly at the end of the 19th century the focus was on underground working further east. Wrexham became the centre of railway activity as main branches led there, and the passenger facilities at Wrexham General station were substantially improved in the period 1909 – 1912.

== Passenger train services ==
In July 1938 there were expresses from London to Birkenhead at 09:10, 11:05, 14:10, 16:05 and 18:10, with some summer Saturday extras. Most of these trains advertised connections for the Isle of Man or Belfast, as well as Liverpool Landing Stage. Travel by the morning train occupied 5 hours and 7 minutes to Liverpool Landing Stage. Most of the expresses stopped at Shrewsbury, Gobowen, Ruabon, Wrexham and Chester, and there were some trains from the south coast conveying through coaches from multiple destinations.

The local service was fairly limited; taking Rednal as an example, there were seven weekday down trains calling, and most of the local trains did not run right through from Shrewsbury to Chester. The general pattern had been similar in 1910, but the journey time was slower (6 hours 40 minutes London to Liverpool) and the last train was earlier, at 16:55.

In 1960 there were express trains from London to Birkenhead at about two-hourly intervals, as well as a night train conveying a sleeping car. Most of the trains made connections to and from Oswestry at Gobowen. The local station service was very limited; for example Stanwardine Halt had three calls a day by down trains.

== Service reductions ==
Retrenchment in World War I resulted in the railmotor halts closing, as well as severance of the Ponkey to Legacy connection. Wrexham to Rhos passenger trains continued running until 30 December 1930.

The line between Pontcysyllte and Pant closed in 1953, and between Pant and Rhos on 14 October 1963. Competition from road services for local transport after World War II resulted in a steep decline in passenger and goods business at intermediate stations, and most of those were closed on 10 September 1962.

When the electrification of the former LNWR London to Birmingham route was complete in March 1967, through trains from Paddington were discontinued, from 4 March 1967.

The Gobowen to Oswestry line passenger service was discontinued on 7 November 1966; it was singled on 2 November 1971 with occasional freight operation, until 28 October 1988.

The original main line from Saltney Junction (Chester) to Shrewsbury remains active, with passenger stations open at Wrexham General, Ruabon, Chirk and Gobowen. Trains are about every hour but at irregular times.

== Location list: main line and Oswestry branch only ==
=== Main line ===
- Chester; joint station;
- Saltney Junction; divergence from Holyhead line;
- Saltney; opened 4 November 1846; closed 1 January 1917; reopened 4 July 1932; closed 12 September 1960;
- Balderton; opened July 1901; closed 3 March 1952;
- Rossett; opened 4 November 1846; closed 26 October 1964;
- Gresford; opened 4 November 1846; closed 10 September 1962;
- Rhosrobin Halt; opened 1 September 1932; closed 6 October 1947;
- Wheatsheaf Junction; divergence to 1847 Minera Branch;
- Wrexham; opened 4 November 1846; renamed Wrexham General; still open;
- Croes Newydd North Junction; divergence to Minera Branch;
- Croes Newydd South Junction; convergence from Minera Branch;
- Rhos Junction; divergence of Legacy line;
- Rhos; opened 14 October 1848; closed February 1855;
- Johnstown and Hafod; opened 1 June 1896; closed 12 September 1960;
- Wynnville Halt; opened 1 February 1934; closed 12 September 1960;
- Gardden Lodge Junction; convergence of Ponkey Branch;
- Ruabon; opened 4 November 1846; still open;
- Plas Madoc Junction; divergence of Plas Madoc branch;
- Llangollen Line Junction; divergence of Llangollen branch;
- Rhosymedre Halt; opened 1 September 1906; closed 2 March 1959;
- Rhosymedre; opened 14 October 1848; renamed Cefn 1849; closed 12 November 1960;
- Fron Branch Junction; divergence of Fron Branch;
- Llangollen Road; opened 14 October 1848; closed 1 July 1862; reopened as Llangollen Road Halt; opened 1 October 1905; renamed Whitehurst Halt 1906; closed 12 September 1960;
- Chirk; opened 14 October 1848; still open;
- Trehowell Halt; opened 27 July 1935; closed 29 October 1951;
- Preesgweene; opened 14 October 1848; closed March 1855; reopened November 1871; renamed Weston Rhyn; 1935; closed 12 September 1960;
- Gobowen; divergence of Oswestry line; opened 14 October 1848; still open;
- Whittington; opened 14 October 1848; renamed Whittington Low Level 1924; closed 12 September 1960;
- Rednal; opened 14 October 1848; renamed Rednal and West Felton 1907; closed 12 September 1960;
- Haughton Halt; opened 22 September 1934; closed 12 September 1960;
- Stanwardine Halt; opened 27 February 1933; closed 12 September 1960;
- Baschurch; opened 14 October 1848; closed 12 September 1960;
- Oldwoods Halt; opened 3 July 1933; closed 12 September 1960;
- Leaton; opened 14 October 1848; closed 12 September 1960;
- Shrewsbury (temporary station); opened 14 October 1848; closed 1 June 1849 on completion of line;
- Shrewsbury; opened 1 June 1849; sometimes known as Shrewsbury General; still open.

=== Oswestry branch ===
- Gobowen; above;
- Park Hall Halt; opened 5 July 1926; closed 7 November 1966;
- Oswestry; opened 1 January 1849; closed 9 July 1924, service diverted to Cambrian Railways station.

== See also ==
- Shrewsbury–Chester line
