= Los Angeles Philharmonic =

Orchestra in California, US

- Orchestra
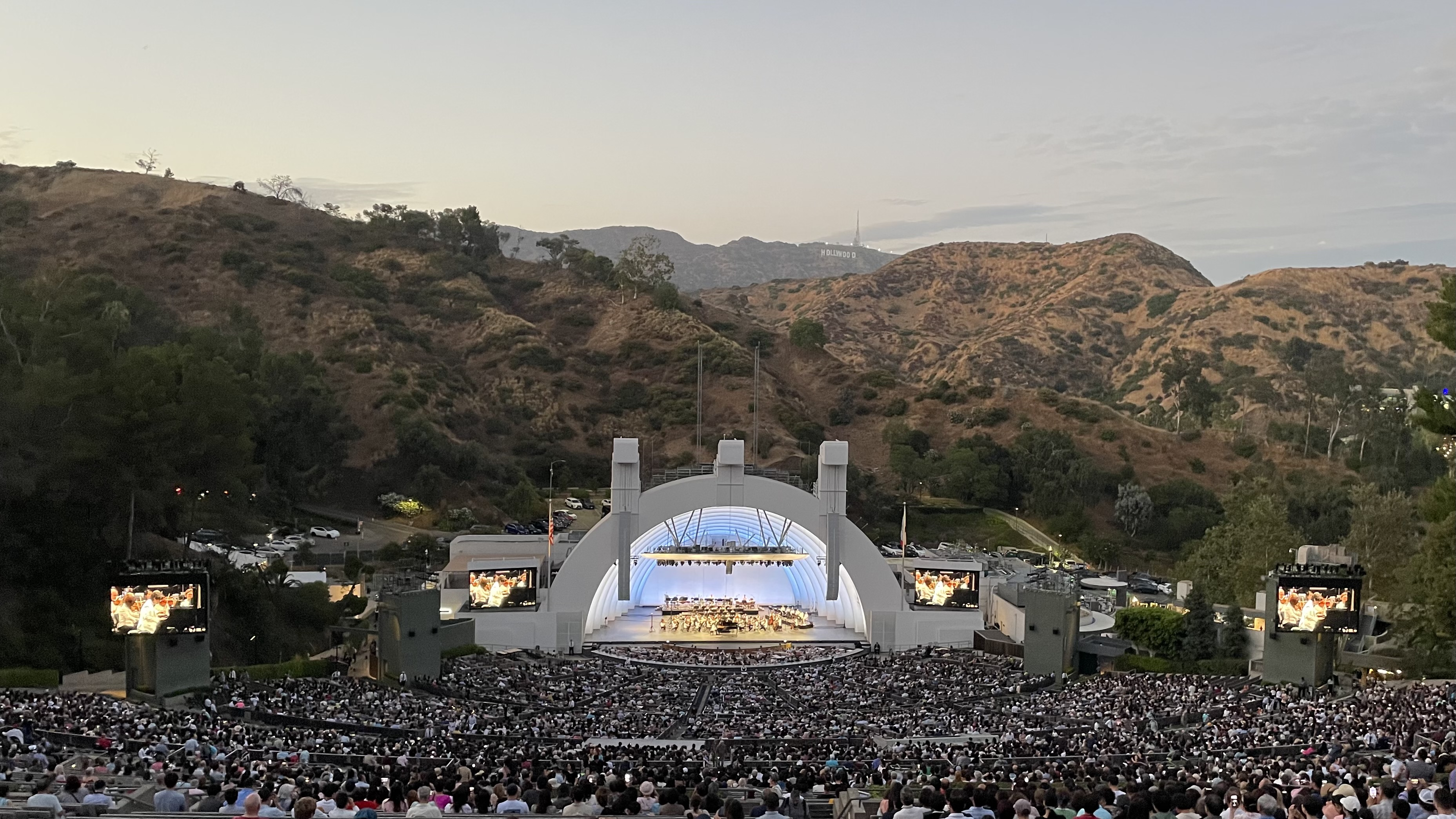
- Los Angeles Philharmonic concert at the Hollywood Bowl
- Short name: LA Phil
- Founded: 1919; 107 years ago
- Location: Los Angeles, United States
- Concert hall: Walt Disney Concert Hall; Hollywood Bowl
- Music director: Daniel Harding (designated)
- Website: www.laphil.com

The Los Angeles Philharmonic (LA Phil) is an American orchestra based in Los Angeles, California. The orchestra holds a regular concert season from October until June at the Walt Disney Concert Hall and a summer season at the Hollywood Bowl from July until September.

Since the opening of the Walt Disney Concert Hall on October 23, 2003, the Los Angeles Philharmonic has presented 57 world premieres, one North American premiere, and 26 U.S. premieres, and has commissioned or co-commissioned 63 new works. The orchestra's former chief executive officer, Deborah Borda, has said, "Our intention has been to integrate 21st-century music into the orchestra's everyday activity, especially since we moved into the new hall".

== History ==
=== 1919–1933: Founding the Philharmonic ===
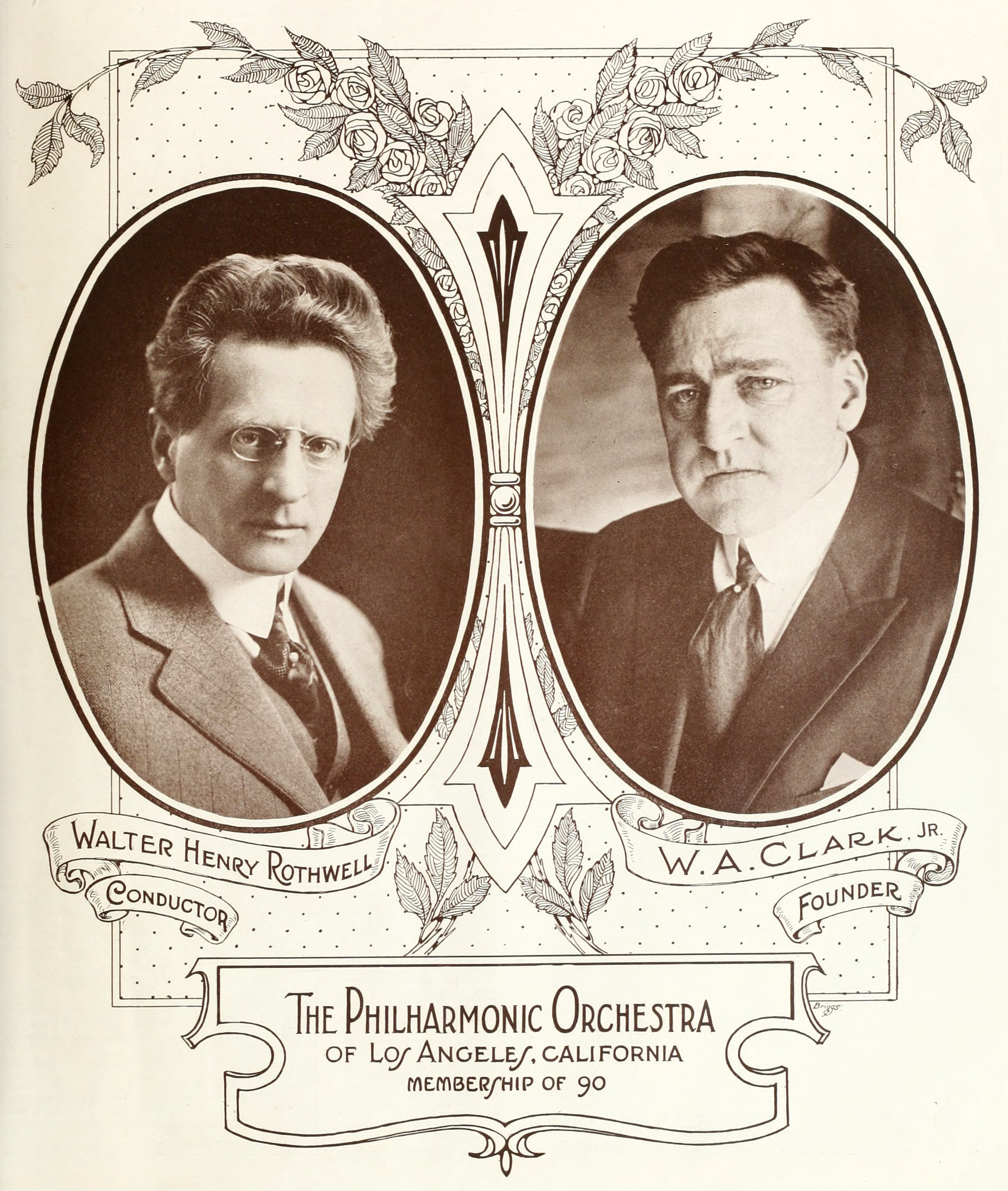
Walter H. Rothwell, first conductor, and W. A. Clark Jr., founder of the Los Angeles Philharmonic

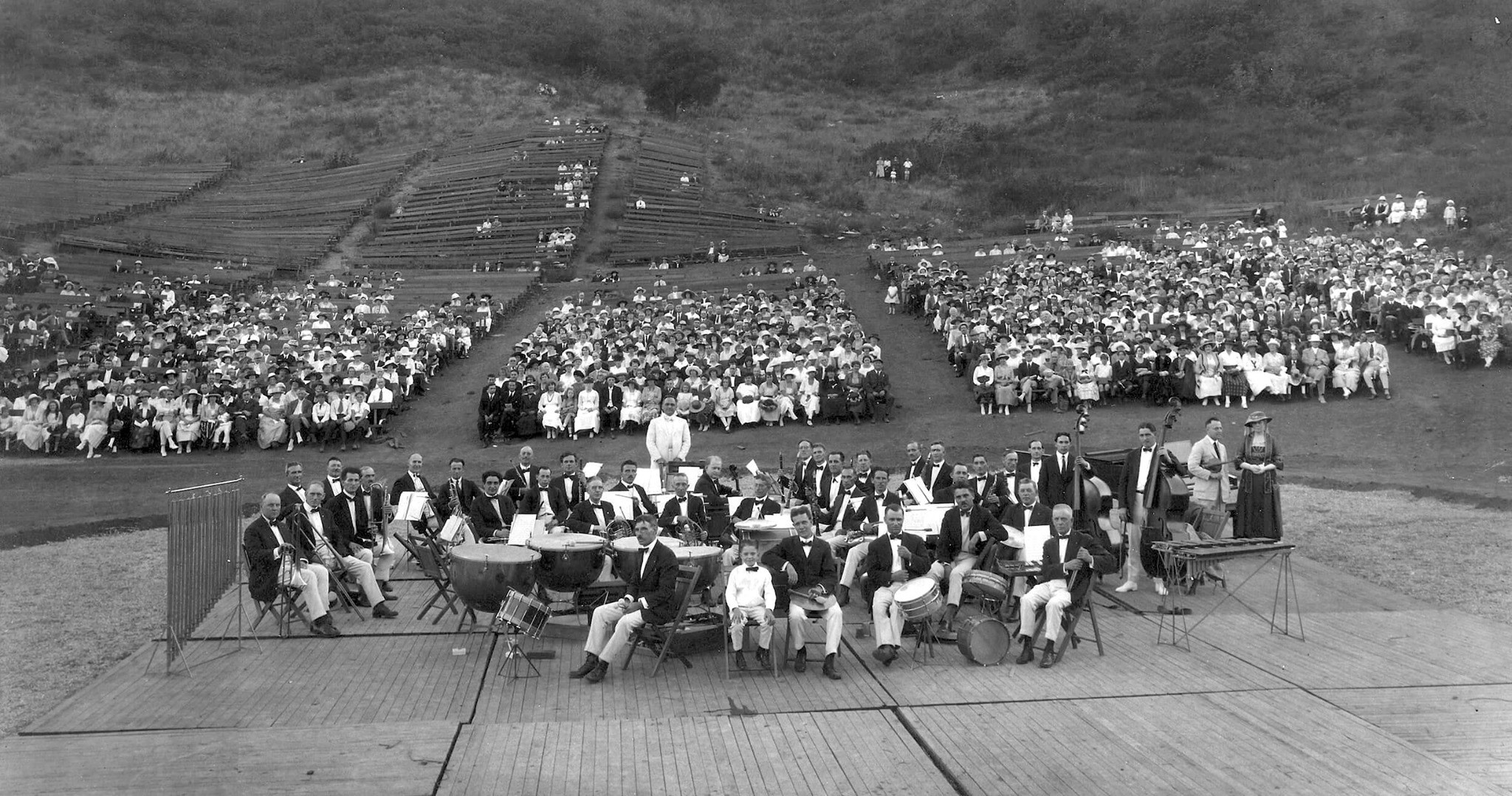
Los Angeles Philharmonic performing at the Hollywood Bowl on August 28, 1921

The orchestra was founded and single-handedly financed in 1919 by William Andrews Clark, Jr., a copper baron, arts enthusiast, and part-time violinist. He originally asked Sergei Rachmaninoff to be the philharmonic's first music director; however, Rachmaninoff had only recently moved to New York, and he did not wish to move again. Clark then selected Walter Henry Rothwell, former assistant to Gustav Mahler, as music director, and hired away several principal musicians from East Coast orchestras and others from the competing and soon-to-be defunct Los Angeles Symphony. The orchestra played its first concert in the Trinity Auditorium in the same year, eleven days after its first rehearsal. Clark himself would sometimes sit and play with the second violin section.

After Rothwell's death in 1927, subsequent Music Directors in the decade of the 1920s included Georg Schnéevoigt and Artur Rodziński.

=== 1933–1950: Harvey Mudd rescues orchestra ===
Otto Klemperer became music director in 1933, part of the large group of German emigrants fleeing Nazi Germany. He conducted many LA Phil premieres, and introduced Los Angeles audiences to new works by Igor Stravinsky and Arnold Schoenberg. The orchestra responded well to his leadership, but Klemperer had a difficult time adjusting to Southern California, a situation exacerbated by repeated manic-depressive episodes.

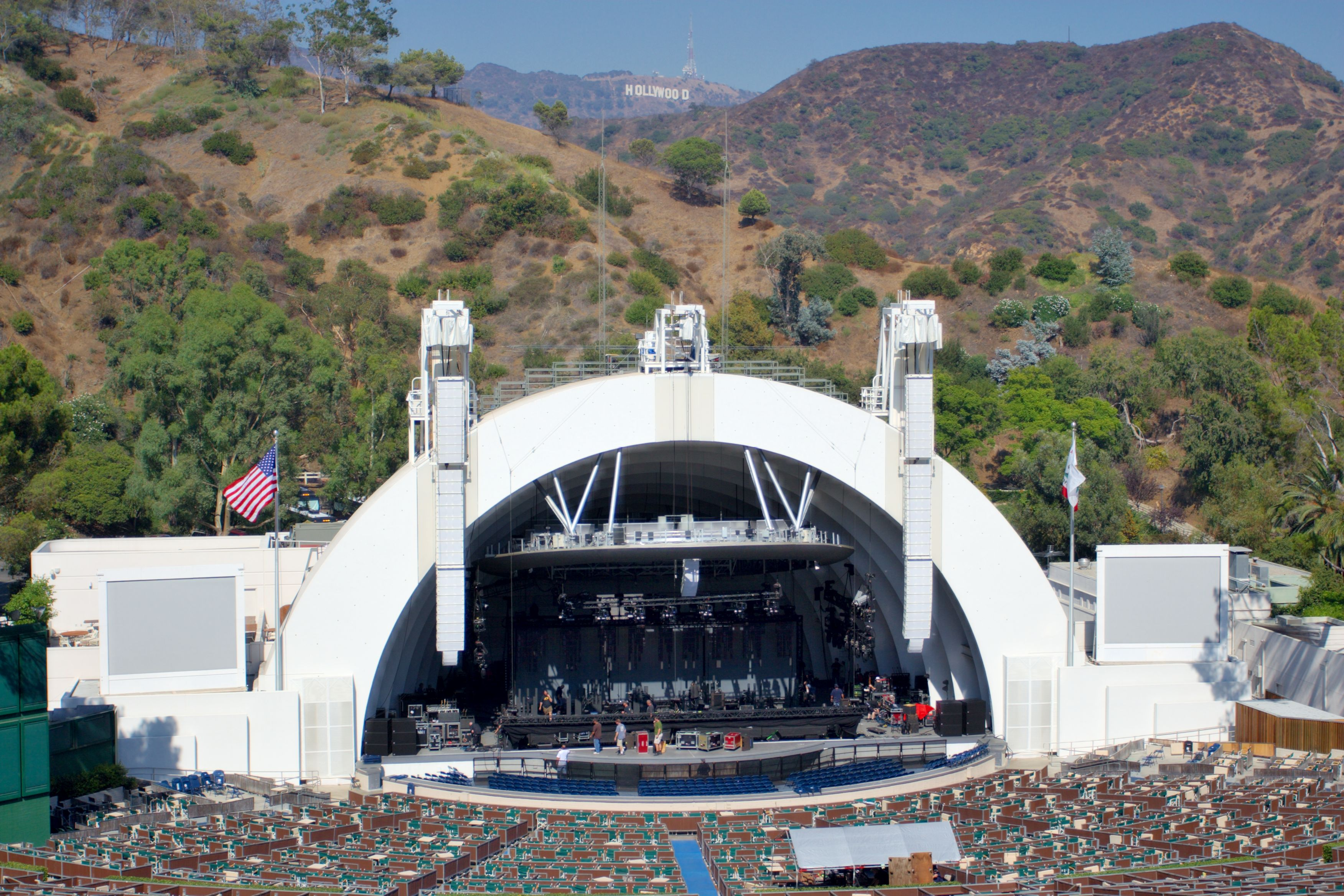
Hollywood Bowl

The situation grew more challenging when founder William Andrews Clark died without leaving the orchestra an endowment. The newly formed Southern California Symphony Association was created with the goal of stabilizing the orchestra's funding, with the association's president, Harvey Mudd, stepping up to personally guarantee Klemperer's salary. The philharmonic's concerts at the Hollywood Bowl also brought in much needed revenue. As a result, the orchestra navigated the challenges of the Great Depression and remained intact.

After completing the 1939 summer season at the Hollywood Bowl, Klemperer visited Boston, where he was diagnosed with an acoustic neuroma. Brain surgery left him partially paralyzed in the face and with impaired hearing in his right ear. He went into a depressive state and was institutionalized. When he escaped, The New York Times ran a cover story declaring him missing. After he was found in New Jersey, a picture of him behind bars was printed in the New York Herald Tribune. He subsequently lost the post of music director, though he still would occasionally conduct the philharmonic. He led some notable concerts, including the orchestra's premiere performance of Stravinsky's Symphony in Three Movements in 1946.

John Barbirolli was offered the position of music director after his contract with the New York Philharmonic expired in 1942. He declined the offer and chose to return to England instead. The following year, Alfred Wallenstein was chosen by Mudd to lead the orchestra. The former principal cellist of the New York Philharmonic, he had been the youngest member of the Los Angeles Philharmonic when it was founded in 1919. He turned to conducting at the suggestion of Arturo Toscanini. He had conducted the L.A. Philharmonic at the Hollywood Bowl on a number of occasions and, in 1943, took over as music director. Among the highlights of Wallenstein's tenure were recordings of concertos with fellow Angelenos, Jascha Heifetz and Arthur Rubinstein.

=== 1951–1968: Dorothy Buffum Chandler's influence ===
By the mid-1950s, department store heiress and wife of the publisher of the Los Angeles Times, Dorothy Buffum Chandler became the de facto leader of the orchestra's board of directors. She led efforts to create a performing arts center for the city, which would eventually become the Los Angeles Music Center and serve as the philharmonic's new home. In addition, she and others sought a more prominent conductor to lead the orchestra. Following Wallenstein's departure, Chandler led efforts to hire Eduard van Beinum, then principal conductor of the Concertgebouw Orchestra, as the LAPO music director. The philharmonic's musicians, management and audience all held Beinum in high regard, but in 1959, he suffered a fatal heart attack while on the podium during a rehearsal of the Concertgebouw Orchestra.

In 1960, the orchestra, under Chandler's leadership, signed Georg Solti to a three-year contract as music director. This followed his guest conducting appearances in winter concerts downtown, at the Hollywood Bowl, and in other Southern California locations including CAMA concerts in Santa Barbara. Solti was scheduled to officially begin his tenure in 1962, and the philharmonic anticipated he would lead the orchestra when it moved into its new home at the then yet-to-be-completed Dorothy Chandler Pavilion. He had even begun appointing musicians to the orchestra. However, in 1961, Solti abruptly resigned before officially taking the post after claiming that the philharmonic board of directors did not consult him before naming then 26-year-old Zubin Mehta to be assistant conductor of the orchestra. Mehta was subsequently named to replace Solti.

=== 1969–1997: Ernest Fleischmann's tenure ===
In 1969, the orchestra hired Ernest Fleischmann to be executive vice president and general manager. During his tenure, the philharmonic instituted several ideas, including the creation of the Los Angeles Philharmonic Chamber Music Society and the Los Angeles Philharmonic New Music Group and its "Green Umbrella" concerts. These adjunct groups, composed of the orchestra's musicians, offered performance series separate and distinct from traditional philharmonic concerts. These initiatives were later adopted by other orchestras worldwide. This concept, considered innovative for its time, stemmed from Fleischmann's philosophy, which he articulated in his May 16, 1987, commencement address at the Cleveland Institute of Music titled, "The Orchestra is Dead. Long Live the Community of Musicians."

When Zubin Mehta left for the New York Philharmonic in 1978, Fleischmann convinced Carlo Maria Giulini to take over as music director. Giulini's tenure with the orchestra was well regarded, but he resigned after his wife became ill and returned to Italy.

In 1985, Fleischmann turned to André Previn, hoping that his conducting credentials and experience at Hollywood Studios would bring a local flair and strengthen the connection between conductor, orchestra, and city. While Previn's tenure was musically solid, other conductors including Kurt Sanderling, Simon Rattle, and Esa-Pekka Salonen, achieved greater box office success. Previn frequently clashed with Fleischmann, notably over Fleischmann's decision to name Salonen as "principal guest conductor" without consulting Previn. This mirrored the earlier Solti/Mehta controversy. Due to Previn's objections, the offer of the position and an accompanying Japan tour to Salonen was withdrawn. Shortly after, in April 1989, Previn resigned, and four months later, Salonen was named music director designate, officially assuming the post in October 1992. Salonen's U.S. conducting debut with the orchestra took place in 1984.

Salonen's tenure began with a residency at the 1992 Salzburg Festival in concert performances and as the pit orchestra in a production of the opera Saint François d'Assise by Olivier Messiaen. This marked the first time an American orchestra was given that opportunity. Salonen later led the orchestra on numerous tours across the United States, Europe, and Asia, as well as residencies at the Lucerne Festival in Switzerland, The Proms in London, a festival in Cologne dedicated to Salonen's own works, and in 1996 at the Théâtre du Châtelet in Paris for an Stravinsky festival conducted by Salonen and Pierre Boulez. During the Paris residency, key philharmonic board members heard the orchestra perform in improved acoustics, inspiring renewed fundraising efforts for the soon-to-be-built Walt Disney Concert Hall.

Under Salonen's leadership, the philharmonic became known as a highly innovative and respected orchestra. Alex Ross of The New Yorker said:

The Salonen era in L.A. may mark a turning point in the recent history of classical music in America. It is a story not of an individual magically imprinting his personality on an institution—what Salonen has called the "empty hype" of conductor worship—but of an individual and an institution bringing out unforeseen capabilities in each other, and thereby proving how much life remains in the orchestra itself, at once the most conservative and the most powerful of musical organisms. ... no American orchestra matches the L.A. Philharmonic in its ability to assimilate a huge range of music on a moment's notice. [Thomas] Adès, who first conducted his own music in L.A. [in 2005] and has become an annual visitor, told me, "They always seem to begin by finding exactly the right playing style for each piece of music—the kind of sound, the kind of phrasing, breathing, attacks, colors, the indefinable whole. That shouldn't be unusual, but it is." John Adams calls the Philharmonic "the most Amurrican [sic] of orchestras. They don't hold back and they don't put on airs. If you met them in twos or threes, you'd have no idea they were playing in an orchestra, that they were classical-music people."

=== 1998–2009 ===
When Fleischmann decided to retire in 1998 after 28 years at the helm, the orchestra named Willem Wijnbergen as its new executive director. Wijnbergen, a Dutch pianist and arts administrator, was the managing director of the Concertgebouw Orchestra in Amsterdam. Initially, his appointment was hailed as a major coup for the orchestra. One notable decision during his tenure was to revise Hollywood Bowl programming by increasing the number of jazz concerts and appointing John Clayton as the orchestra's first Jazz Chair. In addition, he established a new World Music series with Tom Schnabel as programming director. Despite some successes, Wijnbergen departed the orchestra in 1999 after a year marked by controversy. It remains unclear whether he resigned or was dismissed by the philharmonic's board of directors.

Later that year, Deborah Borda, then executive director of the New York Philharmonic, was hired to lead the orchestra's executive management. She began her tenure in January 2000 and was later given the title of president and chief executive officer. Following the financial challenges of Wijnbergen's brief tenure, Borda focused on stabilizing the organization's finances. Described as "a formidable executive who runs the orchestra like a lean company, not like a flabby non-profit," she is credited with putting the "organization on solid financial footing." Borda is widely recognized, along with Salonen, Frank Gehry, and Yasuhisa Toyota, for the orchestra's successful transition to Walt Disney Concert Hall, and for supporting and complementing Salonen's artistic vision. One example is cited by Alex Ross:

Perhaps Borda's boldest notion is to give visiting composers such as [John] Adams and Thomas Adès the same royal treatment that is extended to the likes of Yo-Yo Ma and Joshua Bell; Borda talks about "hero composers." A recent performance of Adams's monumental California symphony "Naïve and Sentimental Music" in the orchestra's Casual Fridays series ... drew a nearly full house. Borda's big-guns approach has invigorated the orchestra's long-running new-music series, called Green Umbrella, which Fleischmann established in 1982. In the early days, it drew modest audiences, but in recent years attendance has risen to the point where as many as sixteen hundred people show up for a concert that in other cities might draw thirty or forty. The Australian composer Brett Dean recently walked onstage for a Green Umbrella concert and did a double-take, saying that it was the largest new-music audience he'd ever seen.

On July 13, 2005, Gustavo Dudamel made his debut with the LA Philharmonic at the orchestra's summer home, the Hollywood Bowl. On January 4, 2007, Dudamel made his Walt Disney Concert Hall debut with the LA Philharmonic. On April 9, 2007, the symphony board announced the departure of Esa-Pekka Salonen as music director at the end of the 2008–2009 season, and the appointment of Dudamel as Salonen's successor. In 2007, two years before Dudamel officially became music director, the LA Philharmonic established YOLA (Youth Orchestra Los Angeles). "The model for YOLA – a nonprofit initiative that supplies underprivileged children with free instruments, instruction, and profound lessons about pride, passion, community, and commitment – is El Sistema, Venezuela's national music training program which, 27 years ago, nurtured the talents of a 5-year-old violin prodigy named Gustavo." On May 11, 2009, shortly before the start of his inaugural season with the LA Philharmonic, Dudamel, was included as a finalist in Time's "The Time 100: The World's Most Influential People."

=== 2009–present ===
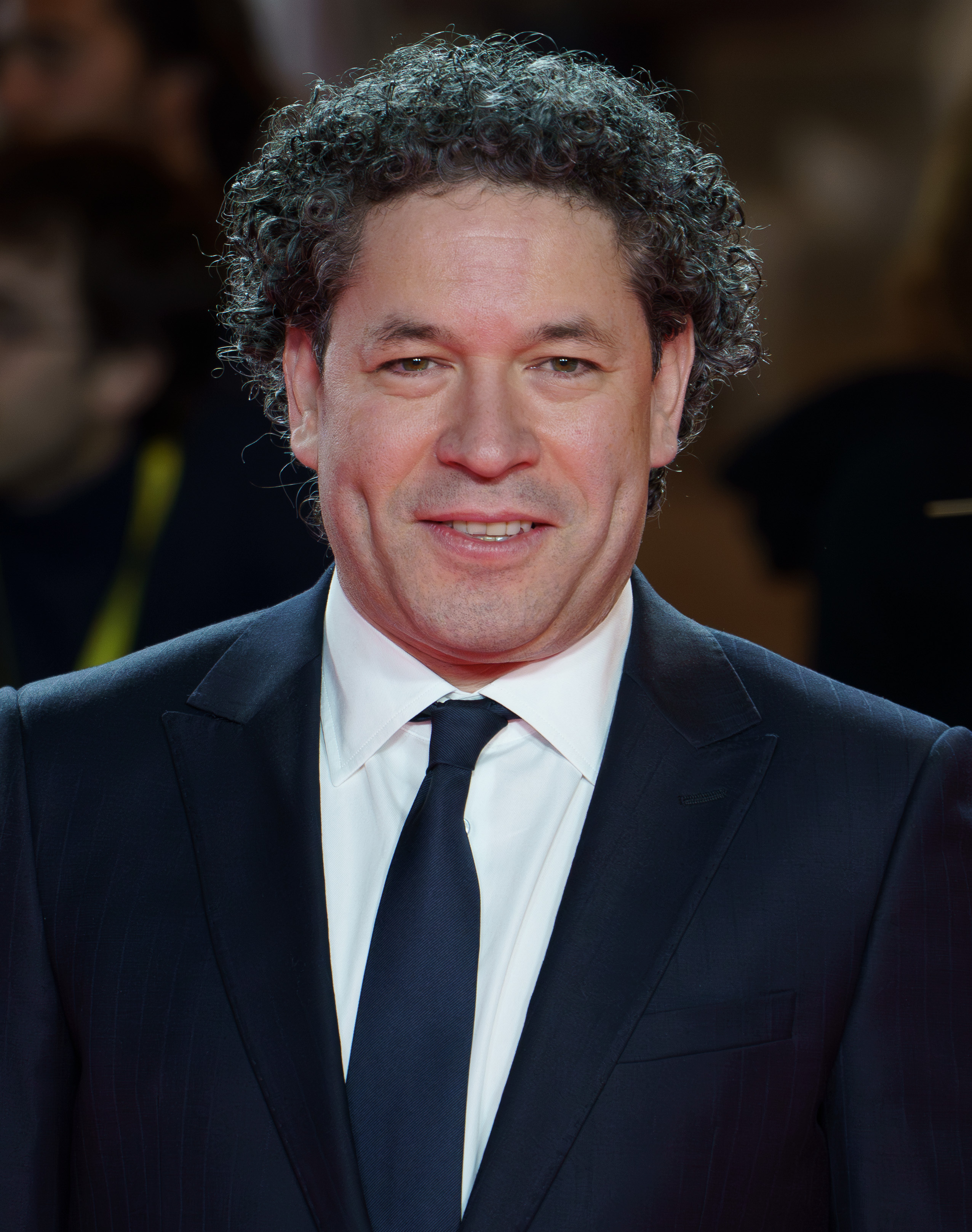
Gustavo Dudamel – Malaga Film Festival 2025

Dudamel began his official tenure as music director of the Los Angeles Philharmonic in 2009 with concerts at both the Hollywood Bowl (¡Bienvenido Gustavo!) on October 3, 2009 and the Inaugural Gala at Walt Disney Concert Hall on October 8, 2009. In 2010 and 2011, Dudamel and the LA Phil received the Morton Gould Award for Innovative Programming by the American Society of Composers, Authors and Publishers (ASCAP), and in 2012 Dudamel and the orchestra won the first place Award for Programming Contemporary Music by ASCAP.

In 2012, Dudamel, the Los Angeles Philharmonic and the Simón Bolívar Symphony Orchestra of Venezuela performed all nine of Mahler's symphonies over three weeks in Los Angeles and one week in Caracas. The project was described as both "a mammoth tribute to the composer" and "an unprecedented conducting feat for the conductor." That same year, the orchestra launched a three-year project to present the Mozart/Da Ponte operas, directed by Christopher Alden with each designed in collaboration with famous architects (sets) and clothing designers. The series launched in 2012 with Frank Gehry and Rodarte designing Don Giovanni and continued in 2013 with Jean Nouvel and Azzedine Alaïa designing Le Nozze di Figaro. In 2014, the featured designers for the Così fan tutte production were Zaha Hadid and Hussein Chalayan.

In October 2011, Dudamel was named Gramophone Artist of the Year. In 2012, Dudamel and the LA Phil were awarded a Grammy award for Best Orchestral Performance for their recording of Brahms' Fourth Symphony. Dudamel was also named Musical America's 2013 Musician of the Year.

The LA Phil's Centennial celebration featured all three of its living music directors: Zubin Mehta (Conductor Emeritus), Esa-Pekka Salonen (Conductor Laureate), and Gustavo Dudamel (Music & Artistic Director). They shared the stage at Walt Disney Concert Hall on October 24, 2019, the orchestra's actual 100th anniversary, according to the LA Phil. Each director led a specific program, culminating in a world premiere From Space I Saw Earth for three conductors by Daníel Bjarnason. In 2020 and 2021, Dudamel and the LA Phil were awarded consecutive Grammy awards for Best Orchestral Performance for their recordings of Andrew Norman's Sustain (2020), and for the collected symphonies of Charles Ives (2021).

In May 11, 2021, following 18 months of canceled concerts due to the COVID-19 pandemic, the Los Angeles Philharmonic announced that it once again will perform for a live audience in summer at the Hollywood Bowl. The season began on May 15 with a free concert for frontline and essential workers given by the LA Phil with Dudamel, featuring Jessie Montgomery's Starburst, the Barber Adagio for Strings and Beethoven's Symphony No. 3, Eroica.

In February 2023, the orchestra announced that Dudamel is to conclude his tenure as its music director at the close of his current contract, at the end of the 2025–2026 season. In February 2024, Dudamel and the LA Phil won the Best Orchestral Performance Grammy award for a fourth time, with their performance of Adès: Dante (2020) by Thomas Adès. In May 2024, the orchestra announced the appointment of Kim Noltemy as its next president and chief executive officer, effective July 2024.

In February 2025, Dudamel and the LA Phil won the Best Orchestral Performance Grammy award for a fifth time, with Ortiz: Revolución diamantina the first full album of orchestral works by Mexican composer Gabriela Ortiz. As the composer for some of the most intense and arresting music of our time, Ortiz's work unites disparate worlds and lives through a compelling rhythmic drive, a street-born authenticity, and a vivid sense of color. The album was nominated for four awards at the 2025 Grammys, receiving three, including Best Classical Compendium and Best Contemporary Classical Composition.

In September 2025, with the search for a new music director still ongoing, the orchestra announced that Salonen would take the newly created title of "Creative Director" beginning in Fall 2026 for a five-year term; responsibilities including conducting six weeks of concerts per seasons. The orchestra later clarified that the position will be concurrent to the eventual music director and also to John Adams' role of Creative Chair, that Salonen would keep his title of conductor laureate, and not be involved in either programming decisions outside his six weeks or have any role in filling open chairs within the orchestra.

On May 26, 2026, the orchestra announced that Daniel Harding would be their next music director, effective at the beginning of the 2027–28 season. The initial contract is for six years, with Harding conducting eight weeks during the first season and 12 weeks each season thereafter.

== Performance venues ==
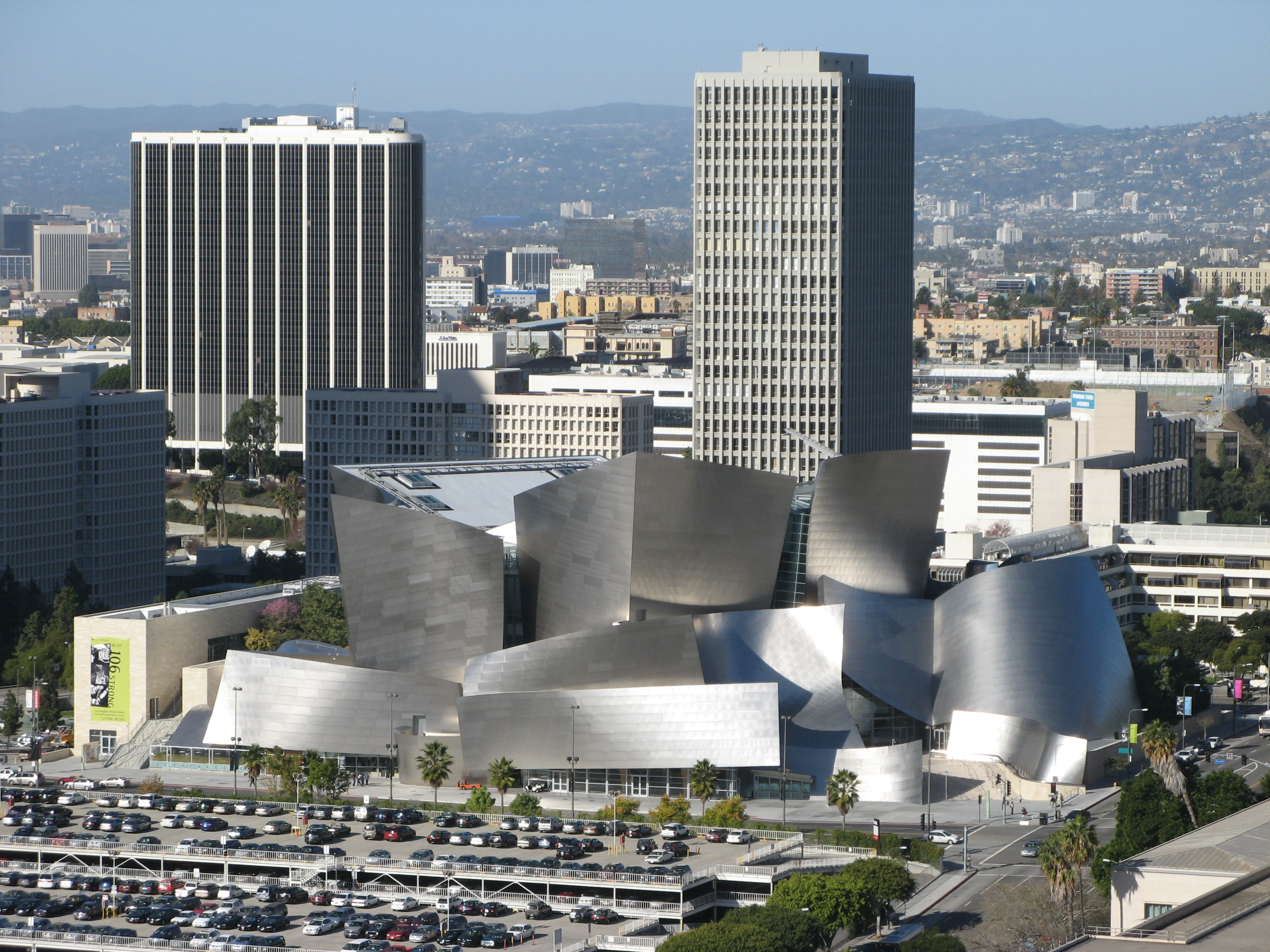
Walt Disney Concert Hall

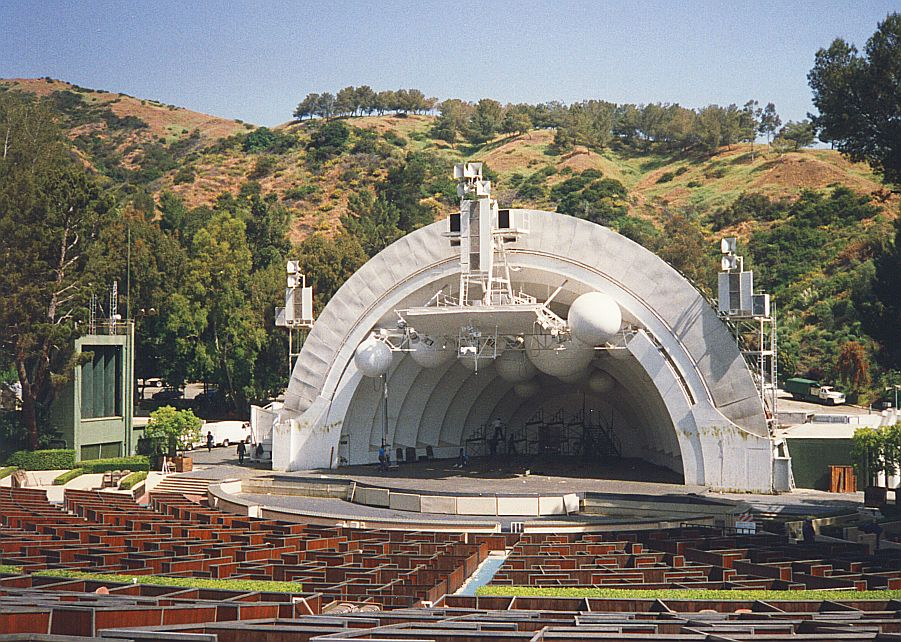
Hollywood Bowl

The orchestra played its first season at Trinity Auditorium at Grand Ave and Ninth Street. In 1920, it moved to Fifth Street and Olive Ave, in a venue that had previously been known as Clune's Auditorium, but was renamed Philharmonic Auditorium. From 1964 to 2003, the orchestra played its main subscription concerts in the Dorothy Chandler Pavilion of the Los Angeles Music Center. In 2003, it moved to the new Walt Disney Concert Hall designed by Frank Gehry adjacent to the Chandler. Its current "winter season" runs from October through late May or early June.

Since 1922, the orchestra has played outdoor concerts during the summer at the Hollywood Bowl, with the official "summer season" running from July through September.

The LA Philharmonic has played at least one concert a year in its sister city, Santa Barbara, presented by the Community Arts Music Association (CAMA), along with other regular concerts throughout various Southern California cities such as Costa Mesa as part of the Orange County Philharmonic Society's series, San Diego, Palm Springs, among many others. In addition, the orchestra plays a number of free community concerts throughout Los Angeles County.

== Conductors ==
=== Music Directors ===
- Walter Henry Rothwell (1919–1927)
- Georg Schnéevoigt (1927–1929)
- Artur Rodziński (1929–1933)
- Otto Klemperer (1933–1939)
- Alfred Wallenstein (1943–1956)
- Eduard van Beinum (1956–1959)
- Zubin Mehta (1962–1978)
- Carlo Maria Giulini (1978–1984)
- André Previn (1985–1989)
- Esa-Pekka Salonen (1992–2009)
- Gustavo Dudamel (2009–2026)
- Daniel Harding (2027–)

Georg Solti accepted the post in 1960, but resigned in 1961 without officially beginning his tenure.

=== Conductor Laureate ===
- Esa-Pekka Salonen (2009–present)

=== Conductor Emeritus ===
- Zubin Mehta (2019–present)

=== Creative Director ===
- Esa-Pekka Salonen (2026–present)

=== Principal Guest Conductors ===
- Michael Tilson Thomas (1981–1985)
- Simon Rattle (1981–1994)
- Leonard Slatkin (Hollywood Bowl, 2005–2007)
- Bramwell Tovey (Hollywood Bowl, 2008–2010)
- Susanna Mälkki (2017–2022)

Rattle and Tilson Thomas were named principal guest conductor concurrently under Carlo Maria Giulini, though Tilson Thomas's tenure ended much earlier. Until 2016, they were the only two conductors to officially hold the title as such (though as stated above, Esa-Pekka Salonen was initially offered the position under Previn before having the offer withdrawn).

Beginning in the summer of 2005, the philharmonic created the new position of Principal Guest Conductor of the Los Angeles Philharmonic at the Hollywood Bowl. Leonard Slatkin was initially given a two-year contract, and in 2007 he was given a one-year extension. In March 2008, Bramwell Tovey was named to the post for an initial two-year contract beginning Summer of 2008; he subsequently received a one-year extension. After Tovey's term ended, no conductor has since held the position at the Hollywood Bowl.

In April 2016, the LA Phil announced Susanna Mälkki as the orchestra's next principal guest conductor, becoming first woman to hold the post. Her tenure began with the 2017–2018 season under an initial contract of three years. She held the post through the 2021–2022 season.

=== Other notable conductors ===
Other conductors with whom the orchestra has had close ties include Sir John Barbirolli, Bruno Walter, Leopold Stokowski, Albert Coates, Fritz Reiner, and Erich Leinsdorf; more recently, others have included Kurt Sanderling, Pierre Boulez, Leonard Bernstein, Charles Dutoit, Christoph Eschenbach, and Rafael Frühbeck de Burgos.

Many composers have conducted the philharmonic in concerts and/or world premieres of their works, including Igor Stravinsky, William Kraft, John Harbison, Witold Lutosławski, Aaron Copland, Pierre Boulez, Steven Stucky, John Williams, Jerry Goldsmith, John Adams, Thomas Adès, and Esa-Pekka Salonen.

A number of the philharmonic's assistant or associate conductors have gone on to have notable careers in their own right. These include Lawrence Foster, Calvin E. Simmons, and William Kraft under Mehta, Sidney Harth and Myung-whun Chung under Giulini, Heiichiro Ohyama and David Alan Miller under Previn, and Grant Gershon, Miguel Harth-Bedoya, Kristjan Järvi, and Alexander Mickelthwate under Salonen. Lionel Bringuier was originally named assistant conductor under Salonen before being promoted to associate conductor and, finally, resident conductor under Dudamel; since then, Mirga Gražinytė-Tyla has served as assistant conductor and associate conductor under Dudamel. In 2026, Anna Handler was named as the orchestra's first ever Composer-in-Residence, with an initial contract lasting three years involving conducting three weeks per year with the orchestra plus chamber music and other appearances.

== Other resident artists ==
=== Composers ===
- 1981–1985: William Kraft
- 1985–1988: John Harbison
- 1987–1989: Rand Steiger
- 1988–2009: Steven Stucky
- 2009–2027: John Adams (continuing beyond 2027 in emeritus status)
- 2027–TBA: Thomas Adès
- 2027–2032: Joe Hisaishi (for the Hollywood Bowl and The Ford)

Kraft and Harbison held the title "Composer-in-Residence" as part of a Meet the Composer (MTC) sponsorship. Steiger was given the title "Composer-Fellow", serving as an assistant to both Harbison and Stucky.

Stucky was also a MTC "Composer-in-Residence" from 1988 to 1992, but was kept on as "New Music Advisor" after his official MTC-sponsored tenure ended; in 2000, his title was again changed to "Consulting Composer for New Music." In the end, his 21-year residency with the orchestra was the longest such relationship of any composer with an American orchestra.

Adams has been named the orchestra's "Creative Chair" beginning in Fall 2009, coinciding with the beginning of Dudamel's tenure. In November 2026, the orchestra announced that Thomas Adès would take over the position of the newly clarified position of "Creative Chair for New Music," with Adams being given emeritus status; both of these would coincide with the start of Daniel Harding's tenure as Music Director at the start of the 2027/2028 season.

Hisiashi was named to the newly created post of "Composer-in-Residence for the Hollywood Bowl and The Ford," effective 2027.

=== Artistic director and creative chairs for Jazz ===
- 2002–2006: Dianne Reeves
- 2006–2010: Christian McBride
- 2010–2027: Herbie Hancock (continuing beyond 2027 in emeritus status)
- 2027–TBA: Samara Joy

Reeves was named the first "Creative Chair for Jazz" in March 2002. Instead of just focusing on summer programming, the new position involved the scheduling of jazz programming and educational workshops year round; as such, she led the development of the subscription jazz series the orchestra offered when it moved into Walt Disney Concert Hall. In addition, she was the first performer at the 2003 inaugural gala at the Walt Disney Concert Hall. Her contract was initially for two years, and was subsequently renewed for an additional two years.

McBride took over the position in 2006 for an initial two-year position that was subsequently renewed for an additional two years through to the start of the 2010 summer season at the Hollywood Bowl. In 2009, the orchestra introduced Hancock as McBride's eventual replacement. In 2026, the orchestra announced that beginning in 2027, Joy would take over for Hancock, who would then take the title of emeritus chair; both moved will coincide with the beginning of Harding's tenure as Music Director

In 1998, prior to the establishment of the Creative Chair for Jazz, John Clayton was given the title "Artistic Director of Jazz" at the Hollywood Bowl for a three-year term beginning with the 1999 summer season. His band, the Clayton-Hamilton Jazz Orchestra, acted as the resident jazz ensemble.

== Recordings ==
The orchestra occasionally made 78-rpm recordings and LPs in the early years with Alfred Wallenstein and Leopold Stokowski for Capitol Records, and began recording regularly in the 1960s, for London/Decca, during the tenure of Zubin Mehta as music director. A healthy discography continued to grow with Carlo Maria Giulini on Deutsche Grammophon and André Previn on both Philips and Telarc Records. Michael Tilson Thomas, Leonard Bernstein, and Sir Simon Rattle also made several recordings with the orchestra in the 1980s, adding to their rising international profile. In recent years, Esa-Pekka Salonen has led recording sessions for Sony and Deutsche Grammophon. A recording of the Concerto for Orchestra by Béla Bartók released by Deutsche Grammophon in 2007 was the first recording by Gustavo Dudamel conducting the LA Phil.

The Los Angeles Philharmonic has performed music for motion pictures, such as the 1963 Stanley Kramer film It's a Mad, Mad, Mad, Mad World (composed by Ernest Gold), the 2025 film Superman, the pilot film of the original Battlestar Galactica TV show (composed by Stu Phillips and Glen A. Larson), and the most recent 2021 film version of the Broadway musical West Side Story (composed by Leonard Bernstein). The LA Philharmonic also performed the first North American concert for the Final Fantasy franchise game music, Dear Friends: Music From Final Fantasy by Nobuo Uematsu. The orchestra has most recently recorded the sound track for the video game: BioShock 2 as composed by Garry Schyman.

The album Fandango includes a performance of Alberto Ginastera's Four Dances from Estancia, recorded live at Walt Disney Concert Hall in October 2022 and Arturo Márquez's new violin concerto Fandango, written for violinist Anne Akiko Meyers.

== Recent world premieres ==
Season	Date	Composer	Composition	Conductor
2011–12	October 20, 2011	Enrico Chapela	Concerto for Electric Guitar	Gustavo Dudamel
	November 11, 2011	Richard Dubugnon	Battlefield	Semyon Bychkov
	November 25, 2011	Anders Hillborg	Sirens	Esa-Pekka Salonen
	December 2, 2011	Dmitri Shostakovich (posth.)	Prologue to Orango (reconstructed by Gerard McBurney)	Esa-Pekka Salonen
	April 10, 2012	Oscar Bettison	Livre de Sauvages	John Adams
	May 8, 2012	Joseph Pereira	Percussion Concerto	Gustavo Dudamel
	May 31, 2012	John Adams	The Gospel According to the Other Mary	Gustavo Dudamel
2012–13	September 28, 2012	Steven Stucky	Symphony	Gustavo Dudamel
	October 16, 2012	Daníel Bjarnason	Over Light Earth	John Adams
	January 18, 2013	Peter Eötvös	DoReMi	Pablo Heras-Casado
	February 26, 2013	Unsuk Chin	Graffiti	Gustavo Dudamel
	February 26, 2013	Joseph Pereira	Concerto for Percussion and Chamber Orchestra	Gustavo Dudamel
	April 16, 2013	Matt Marks	TBD	Alan Pierson
	April 18, 2013	Ted Hearne	But I Voted for Shirley Chisholm	Joshua Weilerstein
2014–15	November 20, 2014	Stephen Hartke	Symphony No. 4 "Organ"	Gustavo Dudamel
	May 14, 2015	Kaija Saariaho	True Fire	Gustavo Dudamel
	May 26, 2015	Christopher Cerrone; Sean Friar; Dylan Mattingly	The Pieces That Fall to Earth; Finding Time; Seasickness and Being (in love)	John Adams
	May 28, 2015	Bryce Dessner; Philip Glass	Quilting; Concerto for Two Pianos	Gustavo Dudamel
	May 29, 2015	Steven Mackey	Mnemosyne's Pool	Gustavo Dudamel
2015–16	2016-02-25	Andrew Norman	Play: Level 1	Gustavo Dudamel
	2016-05-06	Louis Andriessen	Theatre of the World	Reinbert de Leeuw
	2016-05-28	Arvo Pärt	Greater Antiphons	Gustavo Dudamel
2016–17	2017-02-24	James Matheson	Unchained	James Gaffigan
	2017-04-15	María Huld Markan Sigfúsdóttir	Aequora	Esa-Pekka Salonen
2017–18	2017-10-12	Gabriela Ortiz	Téenek – Invenciones de territorio	Gustavo Dudamel
	2017-10-15	Arturo Marquez	Danzón No. 9	Gustavo Dudamel
	2017-12-02	Tania Leon	Ser (Being)	Miguel Harth-Bedoya
	2018-01-25	Joseph Pereira	Concerto for timpani and two percussion	Gustavo Dudamel
	2018-02-23	Nico Muhly	Organ Concerto	James Conlon
	2018-03-31	Isaac Pross Adam Karelin Benjamin Beckman	Under the Table Constructs a(de)scendance	Ruth Reinhardt
	2018-04-13	Esa-Pekka Salonen	Pollux	Gustavo Dudamel
2018–19	2018-09-27	Julia Adolphe	Underneath the Sheen	Gustavo Dudamel
	2018-09-30	Paul Desenne	Guasamacabra	Gustavo Dudamel
	2018-10-04	Andrew Norman	Sustain	Gustavo Dudamel
	2018-11-01	Steve Reich	Music for Ensemble and Orchestra	Susanna Malkki
	2018-11-18	Christopher Cerrone	The Insects Became Magnetic	Roderick Cox
	2019-01-10	Philip Glass	Symphony No. 12 Lodger	John Adams
	2019-02-07	Du Yun	Thirst	Elim Chan
	2019-02-17	Adolphus Hailstork	Still Holding On	Thomas Wilkins
	2019-03-07	John Adams	Must the Devil Have All the Good Tunes?	Gustavo Dudamel
	2019-04-05	Unsuk Chin	SPIRA	Mirga Gražinytė-Tyla
	2019-05-02	Louis Andriesson	The only one	Esa-Pekka Salonen
	2019-05-10	Thomas Ades	Inferno	Gustavo Dudamel
2019–20	2019-10-03	André Previn	Can Spring be Far Behind?	Gustavo Dudamel
	2019-10-10	Esteban Benzecry	Piano Concerto "Universos infinitos"	Gustavo Dudamel
	2019-10-19	Esa-Pekka Salonen	Castor	Esa-Pekka Salonen
	2019-10-24	Daníel Bjarnason	From Space I saw Earth for three conductors	Gustavo Dudamel, Zubin Mehta, Esa-Pekka Salonen
	2019-10-26	Esa-Pekka Salonen	Castor and Pollux (Gemini)	Esa-Pekka Salonen
	2019-10-27	Gabriela Ortiz	Yanga	Gustavo Dudamel
	2020-01-18	Julia Wolfe	Flower Power	John Adams
	2020-03-22	Julia Adolphe	Cello Concerto (Postponed)	Karen Kamensek
2020–21	2021-08-24	Arturo Marquez	Fandango -Violin Concerto, written for Anne Akiko Meyers	Gustavo Dudamel
2021–22	2021-12-03	Julia Adolphe	Woven Loom, Silver Spindle	Xian Zhang

== Awards ==
2010 & 2011, ASCAP Morton Gould Award for Innovative Programming

2012, ASCAP Award for Programming Contemporary Music

Grammy Award for Best Instrumental Soloist(s) Performance (with orchestra)

- 1997, The Three Piano Concertos by Béla Bartók, conducted by Esa-Pekka Salonen

Grammy Award for Best Orchestral Performance

- 2012, Symphony No. 4 by Johannes Brahms, conducted by Gustavo Dudamel
- 2020, Sustain by Andrew Norman, conducted by Gustavo Dudamel
- 2021, Complete Symphonies by Andrew Norman, conducted by Gustavo Dudamel
- 2024, Dante by Thomas Adès, conducted by Gustavo Dudamel

Grammy Award for Best Choral Performance

- 2022, Symphony No. 8 by Gustav Mahler, conducted by Gustavo Dudamel

== Management ==
=== Funding ===
The Los Angeles Philharmonic's endowment grew significantly in the early 21st century, reaching around $255 million in 2017. In 2002, it received its largest gift to date when the Walt and Lilly Disney family donated $25 million to endow the music directorship. David Bohnett donated $20 million in 2014 to endow the orchestra's top administrative post and create a fund for technology and innovation.

As of 2019, the Los Angeles Philharmonic's annual budget is at approximately $125 million.

=== Chief executives ===
- 1969–1997: Ernest Fleischmann
- 1998–2000: Willem Wijnbergen
- 2000–2017: Deborah Borda
- 2017–2019: Simon Woods
- 2019–present: Chad Smith

== See also ==
- Hollywood Bowl Orchestra
- Los Angeles Junior Philharmonic Orchestra
- Los Angeles Philharmonic discography
- Los Angeles Philharmonic Institute
- Category:Music commissioned by the Los Angeles Philharmonic (50)
