= Viola concerto =

Musical work for solo viola and ensemble

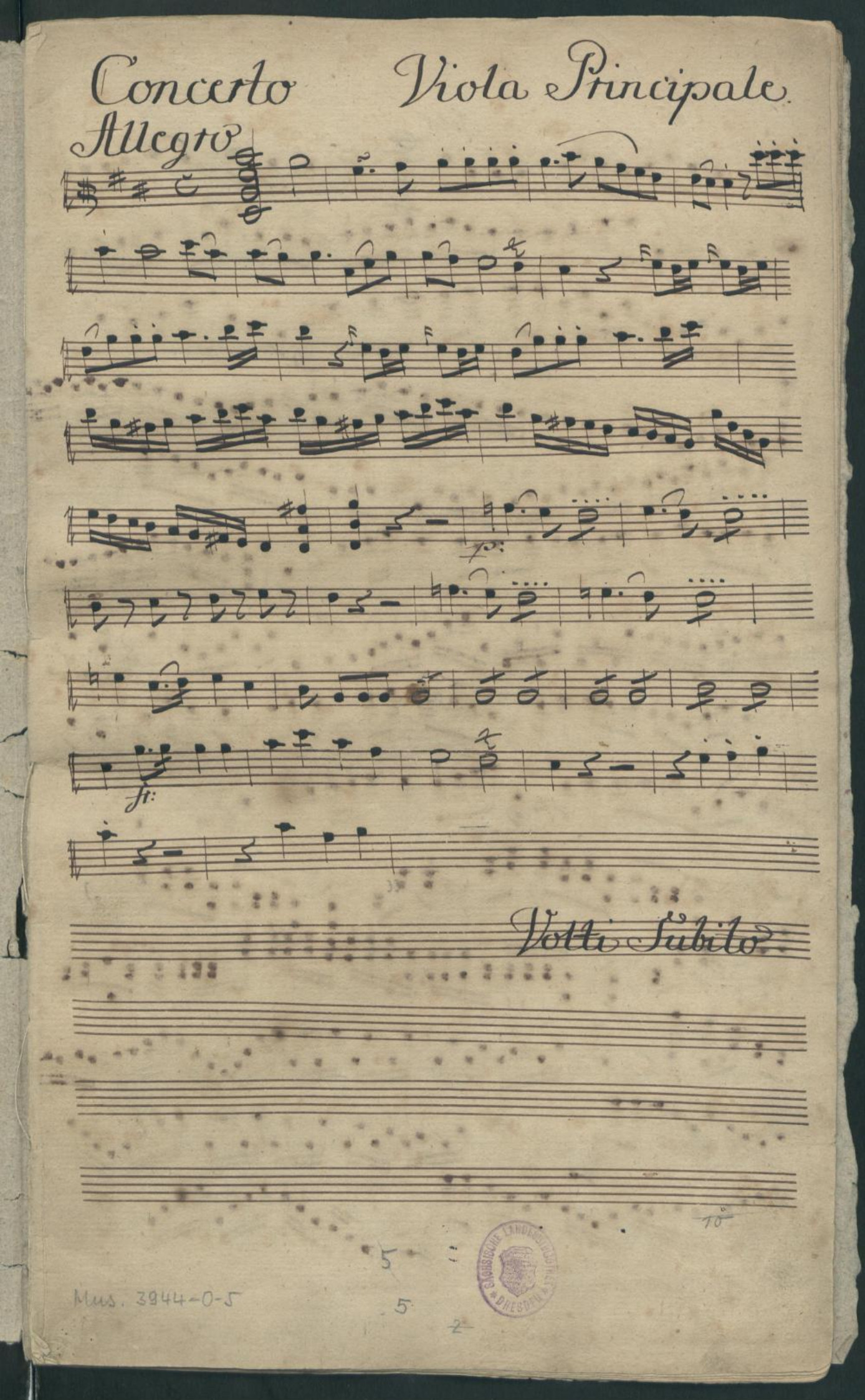
First page of the viola solo part, in the manuscript parts set of Hoffmeister's viola concerto in D

A viola concerto is a concerto contrasting a viola with another body of musical instruments such as an orchestra or chamber music ensemble. Throughout music history, especially during the Baroque, Classical, and Romantic eras, viola was viewed mostly as an ensemble instrument. Though there were a few notable concertos written for the instrument in this time period, these instances were quite rare and the instrument continued to be ignored. However, during the 20th century, the instrument was revitalized thanks to the work of a number of violists and composers, which led to the commission and composition of many more viola concertos, expanding the repertoire significantly.

== History ==
=== Early history ===
Early examples of violas taking solo roles in orchestral settings include Johann Sebastian Bach's Brandenburg Concerto No. 6, scored for two solo violas, Georg Philipp Telemann's Concerto in G major, and Carl Stamitz's Viola Concerto in D major. Arguably, one of the first concertante works to use the viola without caution was Wolfgang Amadeus Mozart's Sinfonia Concertante, scored for solo violin and viola. Although not much work was written for the viola alone in the Classical or Romantic periods, with only a few example concerto-like pieces emerging such as Max Bruch's Romanze, Hector Berlioz's Harold en Italie, or Johann Nepomuk Hummel's Potpourri, the viola concerto would see significant growth from the late 1800s.

=== Revitalization ===
A number of violists and composers are credited with revitalizing the viola concerto and expanding its repertoire, with many of them located in Britain in the early 1900s.

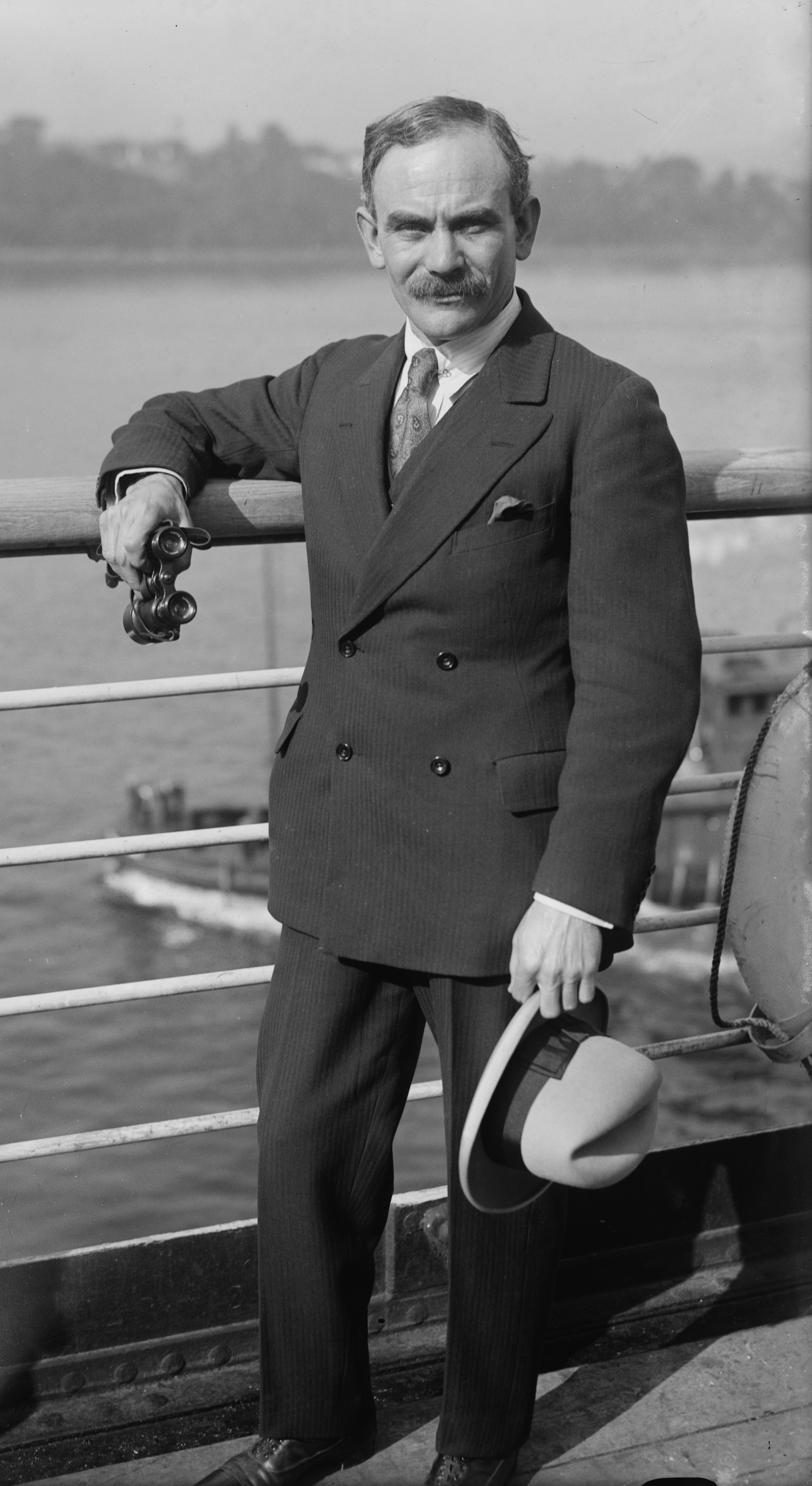
Lionel Tertis

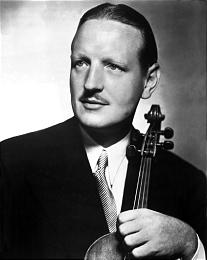
William Primrose

British violist Lionel Tertis is often credited with popularizing the viola as a solo instrument in the early 20th century through advocating for the composition of new pieces, as well as arranging works for the viola. A number of works were dedicated to Tertis including concertos by William Walton and Edwin York Bowen, and other concertante works such as Arnold Bax's Phantasy for Viola and Orchestra. Tertis also commissioned pieces such as Ralph Vaughan Williams' Flos Campi and Gustav Holst's Lyric Movement for Viola and Small Orchestra, in addition to gaining permission to transpose works for the viola, such as Edward Elgar's Cello Concerto and Frederick Delius's Caprice and Elegy for Cello and Orchestra.

William Primrose was also an important figure in establishing the role of the viola as a solo instrument, having a number of concertos dedicated to him by composers such as Quincy Porter and Darius Milhaud. He also commissioned works, with the most famous being Béla Bartók's posthumously completed Viola Concerto.

Other contemporary composers, such as Alfred Schnittke and Krzysztof Penderecki, have composed pieces for Viola and Orchestra. Orchestrations of accompaniments from chamber works into concertante works have also become more popular, with more well known transcriptions being those of Shostakovich's Viola Sonata or Rebecca Clarke's Viola Sonata.

== List of viola concertos ==
- Samuel Adler
  - Viola Concerto (1999)
- Julia Adolphe
  - Unearth, Release (2016)
- Airat Ichmouratov
  - Concerto No. 1 for Viola and Orchestra, Op. 7 (2004)
  - Concerto No. 2 "Rennsteig" for Viola and String Orchestra with Harpsichord, Op. 41 (2015)
- Miguel del Aguila
  - Concierto en Tango (2014)
- Kalevi Aho
  - Viola Concerto (2006)
- Necil Kazım Akses
  - Viola Concerto (1977)
- Malcolm Arnold
  - Viola Concerto with Small Orchestra, Op. 108 (1971)
- Henk Badings
  - Viola Concerto (1965)
- Johann Sebastian Bach
  - Brandenburg Concerto No. 6 (Solo parts for two violas)
- Simon Bainbridge
  - Viola Concerto (1976)
- Lubor Bárta
  - Viola Concerto (1957)
- Béla Bartók
  - Viola Concerto, Sz. 120, BB 128 (1945, unfinished, completed initially by Tibor Serly, though other completions have also been done)
- Stanley Bate
  - Viola Concerto, Op. 46 (1944–1946)
- Sadao Bekku
  - Viola Concerto (1971)
- William Henry Bell
  - Viola Concerto "Rosa Mystica" (1916)
- Jiří Antonín Benda
  - Viola Concerto in F major (about 1775)
- Valentin Bibik
  - Viola Concerto No. 1, Op. 53 (1984)
  - Viola Concerto No. 2, Op. 104 (1994)
- Boris Blacher
  - Viola Concerto (1954)
- Herbert Blendinger (born 1936)
  - Concerto for Viola and Orchestra, Op. 38 (1982)
  - Concerto for Viola and String Orchestra, Op. 16 (1962)
- Tim Brady
  - Viola Concerto (2012)
- Joly Braga Santos
  - Viola Concerto Op. 34 (1960)
- Max Bruch
  - Concerto for Clarinet, Viola, and Orchestra, Op. 88 (1911)
- Revol Bunin
  - Viola Concerto, Op. 22 (1953)
- Willy Burkhard
  - Viola Concerto, Op. 93 (1953/54)
- Diana Burrell
  - Viola Concerto "...calling, leaping, crying, dancing..." (1994)
- Britta Byström
  - Viola Concerto "A walk after dark" (2013)
- Cristian Carrara
  - Viola Concerto "The Waste Land" (2016)
- Henri Casadesus
  - Concerto in B minor in the style of George Frideric Handel
  - Concerto in C minor in the style of Johann Christian Bach
  - Concerto in D major in the style of Carl Philipp Emanuel Bach
- Gyula Dávid
  - Viola Concerto (1950)
- Brett Dean
  - Viola Concerto (2004)
- Edison Denisov
  - Viola Concerto (1986)
- Carl Ditters von Dittersdorf
  - Viola Concerto in F major
- Iván Erőd
  - Viola Concerto, Op. 30 (1979–1980)
- Cecil Forsyth
  - Viola Concerto in G minor (1903)
- Benjamin Frankel
  - Viola Concerto, Op. 45 (1967)
- Kenneth Fuchs
  - Viola Concerto "Divinum Mysterium" (2010)
- Srul Irving Glick
  - Concerto for Viola and Strings
- Steven Gellman
  - Viola Concerto (2004)
- Mikhail Goldstein
  - Viola Concerto in C major (attributed to Ivan Khandoshkin)
- Evgeny Golubev
  - Viola Concerto, Op. 57 (1962)
- Morton Gould
  - Viola Concerto (1943)
- Sofia Gubaidulina
  - Viola Concerto (1996)
- John Harbison
  - Viola Concerto (1988)
- Hans Henkemans
  - Viola Concerto (1954, premiered 1956)
- Jacques Hétu
  - Viola Concerto Op. 75
- Jennifer Higdon
  - Viola Concerto (2015)
- Franz Anton Hoffmeister
  - Viola Concerto in B♭ major
  - Viola Concerto in D major
- Robin Holloway
  - Viola Concerto (1984)
- Gordon Jacob
  - Viola Concerto No. 1 (1925)
  - Viola Concerto No. 2 (1979)
- Michael Jarrell
  - Viola Concerto "Emergences-Résurgences" (2016)
- Giya Kancheli
  - Viola Concerto Mourned by the Wind (1986)
- Nigel Keay
  - Viola Concerto (2000)
- Aaron Jay Kernis
  - Viola Concerto (2014)
- Erland von Koch
  - Viola Concerto, Op. 33 (1946 rev. 1966)
- Peter Paul Koprowski
  - Viola Concerto (1996)
- Joseph Martin Kraus
  - Viola Concerto in C major (attributed to Roman Hoffstetter)
  - Viola Concerto in E♭ major
- Samuel de Lange
  - Viola Concerto (1900)
- Victor Legley
  - Viola Concerto, Op. 78 (1971)
- Kenneth Leighton
  - Concerto for Viola, Harp, Strings and Tympani Opus 15 (1952)
- Ulrich Leyendecker
  - Concerto for Viola and Orchestra (2008)
- Peter Lieberson
  - Viola Concerto (1992)
- Magnus Lindberg
  - Viola Concerto (2023-2024)
- Zdeněk Lukáš (born 1928) (Kabeláč student)
  - Viola Concerto (1983)
- Peter Machajdík
  - Concerto for Viola and String Orchestra "Behind the Waves" (2016)
  - Concerto for Viola and String Orchestra "Between the Waves" (2021)
- James MacMillan
  - Viola Concerto (2013)
- Jef Maes
  - Viola Concerto (1943)
- Bohuslav Martinů
  - Rhapsody-Concerto for Viola and Orchestra (1952)
- Darius Milhaud
  - Viola Concerto No. 1, Op. 108 (1929)
  - Viola Concerto No. 2, Op. 340 (1955)
- Paul Müller-Zürich
  - Viola Concerto in F minor, Op. 24 (1934)
- Nico Muhly
  - Viola Concerto (2015)
- Gösta Nystroem
  - Viola Concerto "Hommage à la France" (1940)
- Krzysztof Penderecki
  - Viola Concerto (1983)
- Allan Pettersson
  - Viola Concerto (1979)
- Walter Piston
  - Viola Concerto (1957)
- Mikhail Pletnev
  - Viola Concerto (1997)
- Quincy Porter
  - Viola Concerto (1948) ()
- Osmo Tapio Räihälä
  - Viola Concerto "Håkan en Belgique" (2002)
- Behzad Ranjbaran
  - Viola Concerto (2014)
- Alessandro Rolla
  - Concertino in E♭ major for Viola and Orchestra (or String Quartet), BI. 328/546
  - Viola Concerto in C major, BI. 541
  - Viola Concerto in D major, BI. 542
  - Viola Concerto in D major, BI. 543
  - Viola Concerto in E♭ major, BI. 544
  - Viola Concerto in E♭ major, BI. 545
  - Viola Concerto in E♭ major, BI. 547
  - Viola Concerto in E major, BI. 548
  - Viola Concerto in F major, BI. 549
  - Viola Concerto in F major, BI. 550
  - Viola Concerto in F major, BI. 551
  - Viola Concerto in F major, BI. 552
  - Viola Concerto in F major, BI. 553
  - Viola Concerto in F major, BI. 554
  - Viola Concerto in B♭ major, BI. 555
- Julius Röntgen
  - Triple Concerto for Violin, Viola, Cello, and Strings in B♭ major (1922)
  - Triple Concerto for Violin, Viola, and Cello (1930)
- Hilding Rosenberg
  - Viola Concerto (1942, 1964, 1945; three versions – 1942, 1964, both for viola and strings, 1945 for larger orchestra)
- Miklós Rózsa
  - Viola Concerto, Op. 37 (1979)
- Edmund Rubbra
  - Viola Concerto in A minor, Op. 75
- Ahmet Adnan Saygun
  - Viola Concerto (1977)
- Alfred Schnittke
  - Viola Concerto (1985)
- Joseph Schubert
  - Viola Concerto in C major
  - Viola Concerto in E♭ major
- Peter Seabourne
  - Viola Concerto (2020)
- Tibor Serly
  - Viola Concerto (1929)
- Ragnar Søderlind
  - Viola Concerto "Nostalgia delle radici" (2003)
- Anton Stamitz
  - Concerto in B♭ major
  - Concerto in F major (1779)
  - Concerto in G major (score published by Schott in 1970; referred to as Concerto No. 2)
  - Concerto in D major (published by Breitkopf & Härtel in 1971; referred to as Concerto No. 3)
- Carl Stamitz
  - Concerto No. 1 in D major (1774)
  - Concerto No. 2 in B♭/A major
  - Concerto No. 3 in A major
- Johann Stamitz
  - Multiple viola concertos (at least one, in G major, published by Litolff in 1962; may have been meant for viola d'amore)
- Frank Stiles
  - Viola Concerto (1955) (composed for and dedicated to Winifred Copperwheat)
- Toru Takemitsu
  - Viola Concerto "A String Around Autumn" (1989)
- Cengiz Tanç
  - Viola Concerto (1986)
- Josef Tal
  - Viola Concerto (1953)
- Georg Philipp Telemann
  - Viola Concerto in G major, TWV 51:G9 (often played by students and young violists as a part of the Suzuki method)
- Haukur Tómasson
  - Viola Concerto, "Echo Chamber" (2015)
- Joan Tower
  - Viola Concerto, "Purple Rhapsody" (2005)
- Erkki-Sven Tüür
  - Viola Concerto, "Illuminatio" (2008)
- Johann Baptist Wanhal
  - Viola Concerto in C major
  - Viola Concerto in F major (according to Duke University, both were originally for violoncello or bassoon)
- William Walton
  - Viola Concerto in A minor (1928–29, revised in 1961; premiered by Paul Hindemith)
- Christian Wilhelm Westerhoff
  - Viola Concerto No. 1 in G major
  - Viola Concerto No. 2 in C major
  - Viola Concerto No. 3 in C major
- Jörg Widmann
  - Viola Concerto (2015)
- John Williams
  - Viola Concerto (2009)
- John Woolrich
  - Viola Concerto (1993)
- Edwin York Bowen
  - Viola Concerto (1908)
- Carl Friedrich Zelter
  - Viola Concerto E♭ major
- Joseph Schmitt
  - Viola Concerto in C major
- Paul Hindemith
  - Der Schwanendreher

== List of other works for viola and orchestra ==
- Airat Ichmouratov
  - Fantasy on D. Shostakovich's Opera "Lady Macbeth of Mtsensk" for Viola and Orchestra, Op. 12 (2006)
  - 3 Romances for Viola, String Orchestra, and Harp, Op. 22 (2009)
- Arnold Bax
  - Phantasy for Viola and Orchestra (1920)
- Hector Berlioz
  - Harold en Italie (1834)
- Ernest Bloch
  - Suite for Viola and Orchestra (1919)
  - Suite Hébraïque (1951)
- Johannes Brahms
  - Sonata for Viola and Orchestra (1894) (transcription of Brahms' Clarinet (or Viola) Sonata, Op. 120 No. 1 by Luciano Berio)
- Max Bruch
  - Romance for Viola and Orchestra, Op. 85
- Rebecca Clarke
  - Sonata for Viola and Orchestra (1919) (Sonata for Viola and Piano orchestrated in 2004–2005 by Ruth Lomon)
- Benjamin Dale
  - Romance (from the Dale's Suite in D major for Viola and Piano (1906), Op. 2, arranged for viola and orchestra in 1909)
- Gyula Dávid
  - Music for Viola and Orchestra (2011)
- Cornelis Dopper
  - Nocturne for Viola and Orchestra (1937)
- Iván Erőd
  - Koncertant Fantasy for Viola and String Orchestra, Op. 35 (1980–1981)
- Morton Feldman
  - The Viola in My Life IV (1971)
- Geoffrey Gordon
  - Meditation and Allegro for Viola and Ensemble (2010)
- Sofia Gubaidulina
  - Two Paths: A Dedication to Mary and Martha for Two Viola Soloists and Orchestra (1998)
- Paul Hindemith
  - Kammermusik No. 5 for Viola and Chamber Orchestra
  - Konzertmusik for Viola with Chamber Orchestra
  - Trauermusik for Viola and Strings
- Gustav Holst
  - Lyric Movement for Viola and Small Orchestra (1933)
- Alan Hovhaness
  - Talin for Viola and Strings, Op. 93, No. 1 (1951–52)
- Herbert Howells
  - Elegy for Viola, String Quartet and String Orchestra, Op. 15 (1917)
- Johann Nepomuk Hummel
  - Potpourri for Viola and Orchestra, Op. 94
- Joseph Jongen
  - Suite, Op. 48 (1915)
- Darius Milhaud
  - Concertino d'été, Op. 311 (1951)
  - Air (from Sonata No. 1), Op. 242 (1944)
- Wolfgang Amadeus Mozart
  - Sinfonia Concertante for Violin, Viola and Orchestra
- Thea Musgrave
  - Lamenting with Ariadne for Viola and Chamber Orchestra
- Niccolò Paganini
  - Quartet 15 for Viola and Orchestra (1820) (transcription of Paganini's Guitar Quartet No. 15)
  - Sonata per la Grand Viola (1834)
- Joseph de Pasquale
  - Theme and Variations for Viola, String Orchestra, and Harp (1954)
  - Variations for Viola, String Orchestra, and Harp (1984)
- Alessandro Rolla (1757–1841)
  - Introduction and Divertimento in F major for Viola and Large Orchestra (incomplete), BI. 329
  - Divertimento in F major for Viola and Orchestra d'Archi, BI. 330
  - Rondo in G major for Viola and String Orchestra, 2 Oboes, and 2 Horns, BI.331
  - Divertimento in G major for Viola and Orchestra, BI. 332
  - Adagio and Thema with Variations in G major for Viola and Orchestra, BI. 333
- Antonio Rolla (1798–1837)
  - Variazioni Brillanti in F major for Viola and Orchestra, Op. 13 (1822)
- Julius Röntgen
  - Introduction, Fugue, Intermezzo and Finale for Violin, Viola, Cello
- Robert Schumann
  - Märchenbilder for Viola and Orchestra (1851) (arranged by Max Erdmannsdörfer from Schumann's Märchenbilder for piano and viola, Op. 113)
- Peter Sculthorpe
  - Elegy for Viola and Strings (2006)
- Tibor Serly
  - Concerto for Viola and Orchestra (1929)
  - Rhapsody for Viola and Orchestra (1948)
- Dmitri Shostakovich
  - String Quartet No. 13 for Viola and Orchestra (1970) (transcription of Shostakovich's String Quartet No. 13 by composer and pianist Alexander Tchaikovsky)
  - Sonata for Viola, Percussion, and Orchestra (1975) (transcription of Shostakovich's Sonata for Viola and Piano by violist and composer Vladimir Mendelssohn)
- Leó Weiner
  - Ballad for Viola and Orchestra (version of the Ballad for Clarinet and Orchestra, Op. 28; may also be found as part of the Clarinet-Piano version numbered Op. 8; premiered by Ilari Angervo & Finnish Radio Symphony Orchestra, conducted by Ernest Martinez-Izquierdo)
- John Woolrich
  - Ulysses Awakes (1989)
- Ralph Vaughan Williams
  - Suite for Viola and Orchestra
  - Suite Flos Campi for Viola, Chorus and Orchestra (technically not a concerto)
- Bernd Alois Zimmermann
  - Antiphonen für Viola und 25 Instrumentalisten

== See also ==
- Viola sonata
- String instrument repertoire
