= Kammermusik (Hindemith) =

Compositions by Paul Hindemith

- Chamber music and concertos by Paul Hindemith
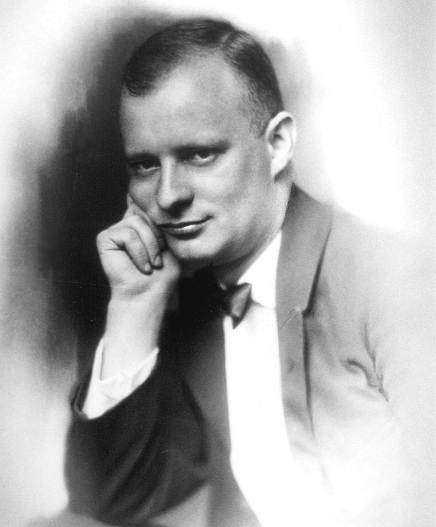
- The composer in 1923
- Opus: 24, 36 & 46
- Form: Eight compositions, each of several movements
- Composed: 1920s

Kammermusik (Chamber Music) is a group of eight chamber music compositions by Paul Hindemith. He wrote them, each in several movements, during the 1920s. They are grouped in three opus numbers: Op. 24, Op. 36 and Op. 46. Six of these works, Kammermusik Nos. 2–7, are not what is normally considered chamber music – music for a few players with equally important parts such as a wind quintet – but rather concertos for a soloist and chamber orchestra. They are concertos for piano, cello, violin, viola, viola d'amore and organ. The works, for different ensembles, were premiered at different locations and times. The composer was the soloist in the premiere of the viola concertos, while his brother Rudolf Hindemith was the soloist in the premiere of the cello concerto. Kammermusik is reminiscent of Bach's Brandenburg Concertos, also concertos for different solo and orchestra instruments, and in a neo-Bachian spirit of structure, polyphony and stability of motion.

== Background ==
Between 1921 and 1927, the majority of Germany's composers were writing nationalistic music, as Germany was recovering from World War I. Many Germans were shocked by the Armistice, and one particular soldier, Adolf Hitler, blamed it on Germany's lack of cultural unity. Over the course of his rise to political power, he repeatedly brought this up, with an emphasis on Richard Wagner, a composer whom he believed to be representative of true German culture.

Hindemith was not among the composers writing for the cause of cultural unification; his works were largely exploratory of the wind medium. Throughout his Kammermusik, he repeatedly used wind instruments. He utilized wind instruments in both works from Op. 24, with Kleine Kammermusik, Op. 24, No. 2, being a wind quintet for flute, oboe, clarinet, horn and bassoon. This work was experimenting with jazz and looking towards his colleague and friend Igor Stravinsky, who coincidentally also explored jazz with his Three Pieces for Solo Clarinet (1918). Its third movement was the result of a letter he received from an American composer describing jazz. In Hindemith's Kleine Kammermusik, Op. 24, No. 2, the composer alludes to Stravinsky by utilizing repeated patterns, similar to repetitive patterns in a groove-like rhythm in that movement.The exploration of jazz by both Stravinsky and Hindemith reflects Ravel's practice of using Basque dance music. This work in particular would go on to become a staple in the wind quintet literature.

The six concertos of Kammermusik have been compared to Bach's Brandenburg Concertos. Hindemith pursued polyphony and a "Baroque stability of motion" as neo-Bachian elements, in a "post-war reaction against the twin emotional excesses of Romanticism and Expressionism". Some musicologists and performers count only the numbered works as Hindemith's Kammermusiken, excluding the wind quintet.

== Overview ==
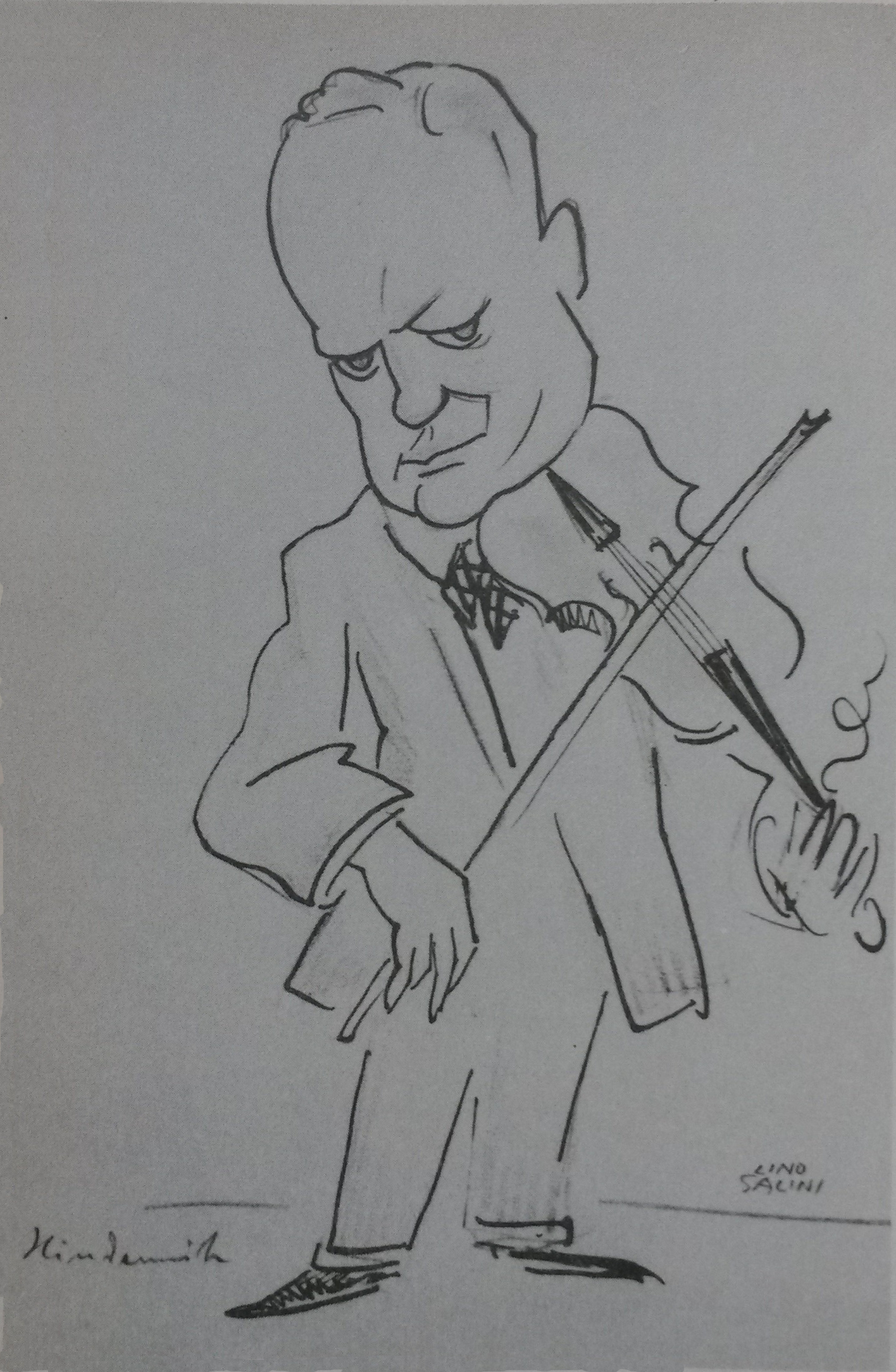
Caricature of Hindemith playing viola

Hindemith's Op. 24 consists of two works. The first, Kammermusik Op. 24, No. 1, was composed for a 13-piece orchestra. The second, Kleine Kammermusik, Op. 24, No. 2, was for wind quintet.

Like Op. 24, Hindemith's Op. 36 also consists of multiple works, Kammermusik Nos. 2–5. These would be named in the order of Kammermusik, the number within the set, the opus number, and then the number within the opus number. For example, Kammermusik No. 3, Op. 36, No. 2 would be the third in the overall set, is included within Op. 36, and is the second piece within Op. 36. All eight works with the exception of Kleine Kammermusik, Op. 24, No. 2 follow this format.

=== Table of Kammermusiken ===
In the table, the first column shows the title, the second the opus number (Op.), the third the number within the opus (No.), the fourth the type of composition, the fifth the number of movements if not 4 (M), and the sixth year and place of the premiere.

Composition	Op.	No.	M	Type	Premiere
Kammermusik No. 1	24	1		Chamber music	1922: Donaueschingen
Kleine Kammermusik	24	2	5	Wind quintet	1922: Cologne
Kammermusik No. 2	36	1		Piano concerto	1924: Frankfurt
Kammermusik No. 3	36	2		Cello concerto	1925: Bochum
Kammermusik No. 4	36	3	5	Violin concerto	1925: Dessau
Kammermusik No. 5	36	4		Viola concerto	1927: Berlin, Kroll Opera House
Kammermusik No. 6	46	1		Viola d'amore concerto	1928: Cologne
Kammermusik No. 7	46	2		Organ concerto	1928: Frankfurt

== Compositions ==
=== Kammermusik No. 1 ===
Kammermusik No. 1
- Opus: 24, No. 1
- Composed: 1922
- Performed: 31 July 1922: Donaueschingen
- Movements: 4

Kammermusik No. 1, Op. 24, No. 1 was composed in 1922, set for flute, clarinet, bassoon, trumpet, harmonium, piano, string quintet and percussion. It is structured in four movements:

1. Sehr schnell und wild (very fast and wild)
2. Mäßig schnell Halbe (moderately fast half-notes)
3. Quartett: Sehr langsam und mit Ausdruck (quartet: very slow and with expression)
4. Finale 1921: Lebhaft (lively)

It is dedicated to the Prince of Fürstenberg, "Dedicated to His Highness the Prince of Fürstenberg". The composition was premiered in Donaueschingen on 31 July 1922 as part of the second Donaueschingen Chamber Music Festival, conducted by Hermann Scherchen.

After the premiere, Hindemith was stamped "the badboy" of the music of the 1920s. A reviewer wrote: "We've reached it at last! Modern German music has finally managed to embrace today's lifestyle having its fling at its most frivolous and vulgar. The man who brought about this wonder is the composer Paul Hindemith in his Kammermusik op. 24/1. One is confronted with a kind of music the likes of which no German composer with an artistic attitude has ever even dared think about, let alone write, music of a lewdness and frivolity only possible for a very special kind of composer."

=== Kleine Kammermusik ===
Kleine Kammermusik
- Wind quintet
- Opus: 24, No. 2
- Composed: 1922
- Performed: 13 June 1922: Cologne
- Duration: 13 min.
- Movements: 5

Kleine Kammermusik
Performed by the Soni Ventorum Wind Quintet

Kleine Kammermusik (Small Chamber Music or Little Chamber Music), Op. 24, No. 2, was composed in 1922 for wind quintet. It is structured in five movements:

1. Lustig. Mäßig schnell Viertel (merry. moderately fast quarter-notes)
2. Walzer: Durchweg sehr leise (waltz: consistently very soft)
3. Ruhig und einfach (calm and simple)
4. Schnelle Viertel (fast quarter notes)
5. Sehr lebhaft (very lively)

Hindemith composed the work for the Frankfurter Bläser-Kammermusikvereinigung (Frankfurt Wind Chamber Music Association), one of the first wind ensembles in Germany, and dedicated it to them. He took some material from the earlier work, Kammermusik No. 1, compared to which this was named Kleine. The music was premiered in Cologne on 13 June 1922 as part of the second Rheinisches Kammermusikfest (Rhenish Chamber Music Festival) by the Frankfurter Bläser-Kammermusikvereinigung. The duration is given by the publisher Schott as 13 minutes.

=== Kammermusik No. 2 ===
Kammermusik No. 2
- Chamber piano concerto
- Opus: 36, No. 1
- Composed: 1924
- Dedication: Emma Lübbecke-Job
- Performed: 31 October 1924: Frankfurt
- Movements: 4
- Scoring: piano; 12 instruments

Kammermusik No. 2, Op. 36, No. 1, was composed in 1924 as a chamber piano concerto, for piano and 12 instruments. The title on the composer's score is Kammermusik II (Klavierkonzert). It is structured in four movements:

1. Sehr lebhafte Achtel (very lively eighth notes)
2. Sehr langsame Achtel (very slow eighth notes)
3. Kleines Potpourri: Sehr lebhafte Viertel (little potpourri: very lively quarter notes)
4. Finale: Schnelle Viertel (fast quarter-notes)

The piano part is not in the tradition of virtuoso pianism, but returns to mostly two-part writing, similar to Bach's Inventions. It is an early work in neo-Bachian style. The work is dedicated to the pianist who was soloist in the premiere: "For Emma Lübbecke-Job". It was premiered in Frankfurt on 31 October 1924, with the Frankfurter Museumsorchester conducted by Clemens Krauss.

=== Kammermusik No. 3 ===
Kammermusik No. 3
- Chamber cello concerto
- Opus: 36, No. 2
- Composed: 1925
- Dedication: Elsa and Willi Hof
- Performed: 30 April 1925: Bochum
- Movements: 4
- Scoring: cello; 10 instruments

Kammermusik No. 3, Op. 36, No. 2, was written in 1925, like a cello concerto for cello and ten instruments. The title of Hindemith's score reads: Paul Hindemith op 36 II / Kammermusik No III / für obligates Violoncello und zehn Soloinstrumente. It is structured in four movements:

1. Majestätisch und stark. Mäßig schnelle Achtel (majestic and strong: moderately fast eighth-notes)
2. Lebhaft und lustig (lively and merry)
3. Sehr ruhige und gemessen schreitende Viertel (very calm and measuredly striding quarter-notes)
4. Mäßig bewegte Halbe. Munter, aber immer gemächlich (very agitated half-notes. Cheerful, but always leisurely

It is dedicated: "For Elsa and Willi Hof". It was premiered in Bochum on 30 April 1925 by members of the municipal orchestra (Städtisches Orchester Bochum), conducted by the composer, with his brother Rudolf Hindemith as the cellist.

=== Kammermusik No. 4 ===
Kammermusik No. 4
- Chamber violin concerto
- Opus: 36, No. 3
- Composed: 1925
- Dedication: "Yashnykneshpeff for a dear lion's birthday"
- Performed: 17 September 1925: Dessau
- Movements: 5
- Scoring: violin; chamber orchestra

Kammermusik No. 4, Op. 36, No. 3, was written in 1925, like a violin concerto for violin and a larger chamber orchestra. The title of Hindemith's score reads Paul Hindemith Op 36 3 | Kammermusik No IV | für Solo-Violine und grösseres Kammerorchester. It is structured in five movements:

1. Signal: Breite, majestätische Halbe (broad majestic half-notes)
2. Sehr lebhaft (very lively)
3. Nachtstück: Mäßig schnelle Achtel (nocturne: moderately fast eighth-notes)
4. Lebhafte Viertel (lively quarter notes)
5. So schnell wie möglich (as fast as possible)

Hindemith wrote in his catalogue that he enjoyed writing this work very much. He scored it for extreme registers, high piccolo flutes and low contrabassoon, bass tuba and four double basses, for a piercing tutti sound. The music is dedicated: "Yashnykneshpeff for a dear lion's birthday" ("Yashnykneshpeff für eines lieben Löwen Geburtstag"). It was premiered in Dessau on 17 September 1925 for the opening concert of the concert series of the Friedrich Theatre, conducted by Franz von Hoesslin, with violinist Licco Amar as the soloist.

=== Kammermusik No. 5 ===
Kammermusik No. 5
- Chamber viola concerto
- Opus: 36, No. 4
- Composed: 1925
- Dedication: Arnold Mendelssohn
- Performed: 3 November 1927: Berlin, Kroll Opera House
- Movements: 4
- Scoring: viola; chamber orchestra

Kammermusik No. 5, Op. 36, No. 4, was composed in 1925, like a viola concerto for viola and larger chamber orchestra ("für Solo-Bratsche und größeres Kammerorchester (Bratschenkonzert)"). It is structured in four movements:

1. Schnelle Halbe (fast half-notes)
2. Langsam (slow)
3. Mäßig schnell (moderately fast)
4. Variante eines Militärmarsches (variant of a military march)

The work is regarded as one of the most difficult viola concertos. The orchestra is formed by several wind instruments, and only cellos and double basses for strings, probably to grant the viola dominance. The last movement, named "variant of a military march" is based on the Bavarian Defilers' March which the viola "brings out of step".

The concerto is dedicated to Arnold Mendelssohn ("Herrn Professor Arnold Mendelssohn gewidmet"). Mendelssohn, the son of cousin of Felix Mendelssohn, was his teacher at the Musikhochschule Frankfurt. It was premiered at the Kroll Opera House in Berlin on 3 November 1927 by the Staatskapelle Berlin, conducted by Otto Klemperer, with the composer as the viola soloist.

=== Kammermusik No. 6 ===
Kammermusik No. 6
- Chamber viola d'amore concerto
- Opus: 46, No. 1
- Composed: 1927
- Performed: 29 March 1928: Cologne
- Movements: 4
- Scoring: viola d'amore; chamber orchestra

Kammermusik No. 6, Op. 46, No. 1, was written in 1927 as a concerto for viola d'amore and chamber orchestra ("für Viola d'amore und Kammerorchester (Viola d'amore-Konzert)"). It is structured in four movements:

1. Mäßig schnell, majestätisch (moderately fast, majestic)
2. Langsam (slow)
3. Variationen (variations)
4. Lebhaft, wie früher (lively, as before)

The work bears no dedication. It was premiered in Cologne on 29 March 1928 by members of the municipal orchestra of Frankfurt (Städtisches Orchester Frankfurt), conducted by Ludwig Rottenberg, and the composer as the viola d'amore soloist. Reviewer Theodor W. Adorno noted then: "At times in the slow parts there are passages of a great, mournfully sad stillness, just like the mood in the evening on the edge of a large city". Hindemith revised the work with a less difficult solo part in 1929.

=== Kammermusik No. 7 ===
Kammermusik No. 7
- Chamber organ concerto
- Opus: 46, No. 2
- Composed: 1927
- Dedication: Frankfurt radio station
- Performed: 1 August 1928: Frankfurt
- Movements: 3
- Scoring: organ; chamber orchestra

Kammermusik No. 7, Op. 46, No. 2, was composed in 1927 as a concerto for organ and chamber orchestra ("für Orgel und Kammerorchester (Orgelkonzert)"). It is structured in three movements:

1. Nicht zu schnell (not too fast)
2. Sehr langsam und ganz ruhig (very slow and completely calm)
3. [Achtel bis 184] (eighth notes up to 184)

It is dedicated to the Frankfurt radio station ("Dem Frankfurter Sender gewidmet"). It was premiered in Frankfurt on 1 August 1928, conducted by Rottenberg, with Reinhold Merten as the organ soloist.
