= Purple Rhapsody =

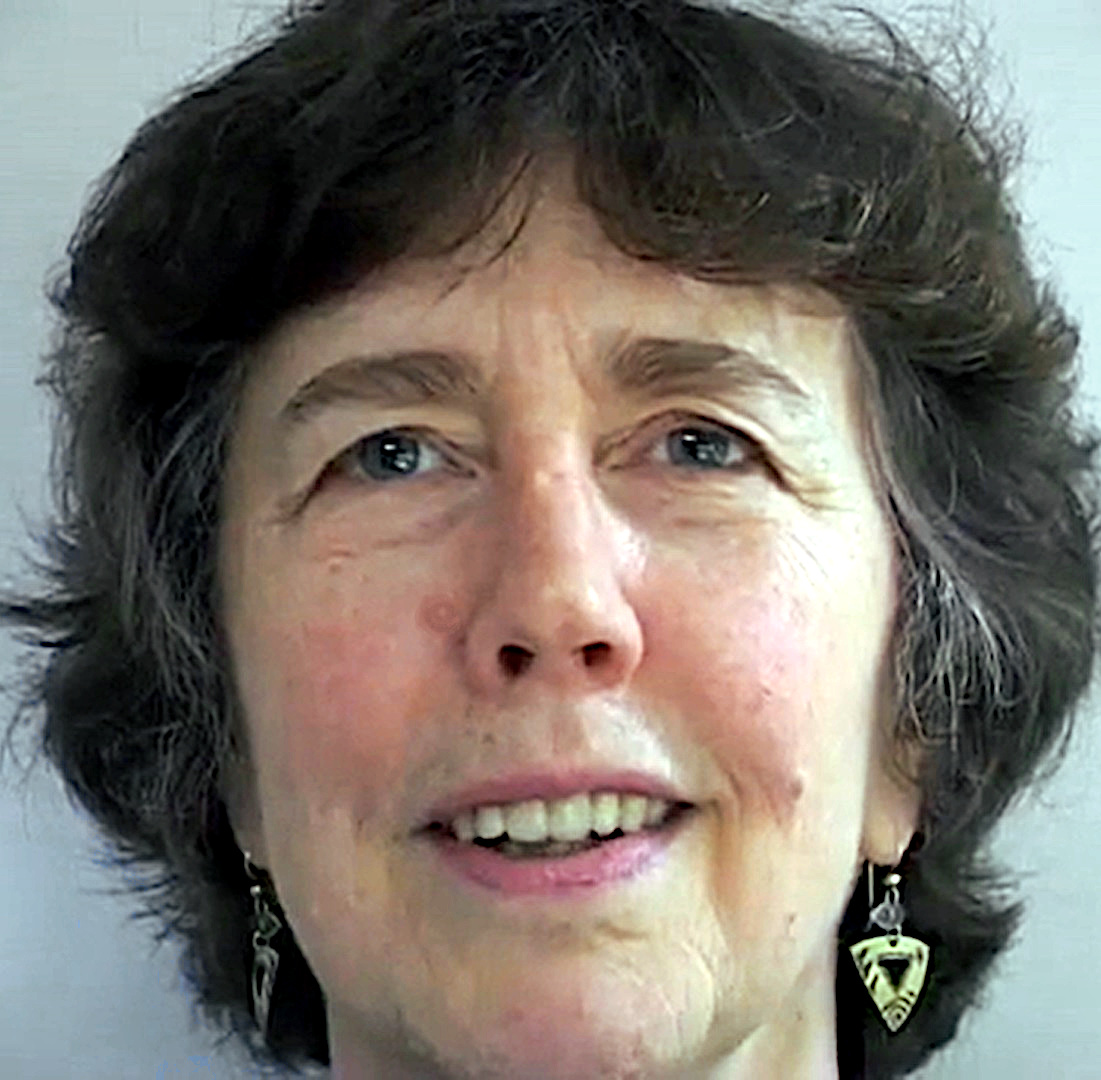
Joan Tower ca. 2002–05

Purple Rhapsody is a viola concerto by the American composer Joan Tower. The work was jointly commissioned by the Omaha Symphony Orchestra with the Buffalo Philharmonic Orchestra, the Virginia Symphony Orchestra, the Kansas City Symphony, the ProMusica Chamber Orchestra, Peninsula Music Festival Orchestra, and the Chautauqua Symphony Orchestra with a grant from the Serge Koussevitzky Music Foundation in the Library of Congress. It was first performed on November 4, 2005, by the Omaha Symphony Orchestra and the violist Paul Neubauer, to whom the piece is dedicated.

== Composition ==
Purple Rhapsody has a duration of roughly 18 minutes and is composed in one continuous movement. Tower described the origins of the title in the score program notes, writing, "The sound of the viola has always reminded me of the color purple-a deep kind of luscious purple." This mental association was also reflected in her work Wild Purple, her first solo viola composition for Paul Neubauer. When writing for the viola, Tower says she tries to make the instrument "sing", making optimal use of the instrument's melodic characteristics, something that is often difficult to achieve. "[It] is not an easy task since the viola is one of the tougher instruments to pit against an orchestra." To address this problem, Tower deliberately omitted instruments that share the viola's range, specifically horns and oboes. She concluded, "I am hoping that at the climaxes of some of these 'rhapsodic' and energetic lines, the orchestra does not overwhelm the viola."

=== Instrumentation ===
The work is scored for a small orchestra comprising two flutes (doubling piccolo), two clarinets (doubling bass clarinets), two bassoons, two trumpets, bass trombone, timpani, percussion, and strings.

== Reception ==
Allan Kozinn of The New York Times praised Purple Rhapsody, remarking, "...this Neo-Romantic score has its own allure, most notably a seductively singing solo viola line, set atop — and sometimes woven into — a sumptuous, assertive orchestral fabric." The violist Paul Neubauer, for whom the concerto was written, also lauded the work, saying, "It's a fabulous, exciting piece. It has a rhapsodic feel with big sweeping orchestral sections and fast passage work for me. It's very dramatic — there's arresting tension."
