= A String Around Autumn =

Viola concerto by Toru Takemitsu

- Viola concerto by Toru Takemitsu
- Catalogue: W18 (Siddons)
- Form: Concerto
- Based on: Poem by Makoto Ōoka
- Composed: 1989
- Performed: 29 November 1989: Paris
- Published: 1991: Japan
- Movements: 1
- Scoring: Viola and large orchestra

A String Around Autumn (Japanese: ア・ストリング・アラウンド・オータム), sometimes also called the Viola Concerto, is a concerto for viola and orchestra by Japanese composer Toru Takemitsu. It was finished in 1989.

== Composition ==
The composition was commissioned by the Festival d’Automne à Paris in 1989 as part of their commemoration of the French Revolution’s bicentennial. The title is based on a short poem by Makoto Ōoka:

Sink
Don’t sing.
Be simply
Silent.
Be simple:
A string
To wind around
Autumn.

— Makoto Ōoka, A String Around Autumn

Takemitsu stated that he chose this title because of the two words at the end: string and, more especially, autumn, even though some critics have acknowledged the two intended comparisons between the "string" (being the solo viola) and "autumn", which is the season in which the festival took place. Takemitsu, a French music lover, decided to create a composition very similar to the style of Claude Debussy and, especially, Olivier Messiaen, his "spiritual mentor", for the French audience of the festival.

Even though the work is usually referred to as a concerto, Takemitsu initially called it an "imaginary landscape". This viola concerto was first performed in the Salle Pleyel in Paris, on November 29, 1989. On this occasion, the soloist was Nobuko Imai, with the Orchestre de Paris conducted by Kent Nagano. It was later published by Schott Japan in 1991 and has received a catalogue number W18 by James Siddons.

== Structure ==
The composition takes around 16 minutes to perform and is in one movement. It is scored for a solo viola and a large orchestra, consisting of 3 flutes, 2 oboes, English horn, 4 clarinets, 3 bassoons, 4 horns, 3 trumpets, 3 trombones, vibraphone, glockenspiel, chimes, suspended cymbals, gongs, tamtams, 2 harps, piano, celesta, and a large section of strings.

== Recordings ==
- Nobuko Imai, the violist who premiered this piece, recorded it in August 1990, with the Saito Kinen Orchestra under Seiji Ozawa. It has been distributed by Decca Records.
- Philip Dukes recorded it again with the BBC National Orchestra of Wales on February 4 to 6, 2001, in the Salle de musique l'heure bleu, in La Chaux-de-Fonds, Switzerland. It was released under BIS Records.
- Nobuko Imai recorded the piece again in September 21 to 24, 2006 in the Salle de musique l'heure bleu, in La Chaux-de-Fonds, Switzerland, this time with the Orchestra of the Conservatoire Supérieur et Académie de Musique Tibor Varga, under Gábor Takács-Nagy. This recording was released by Pan Classics.
