= From Space I Saw Earth =

Composition by Daníel Bjarnason

- Orchestral composition by Daníel Bjarnason
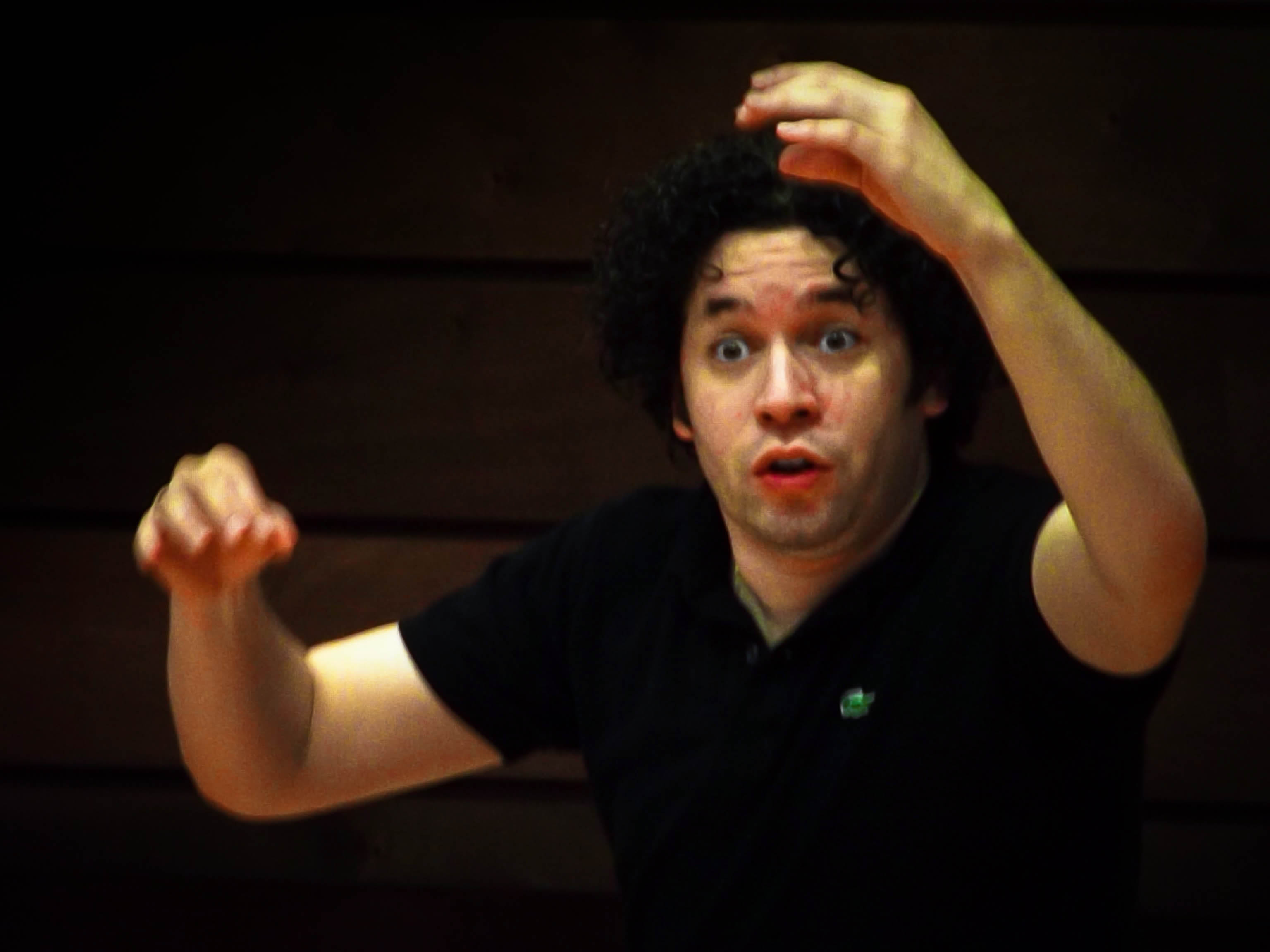
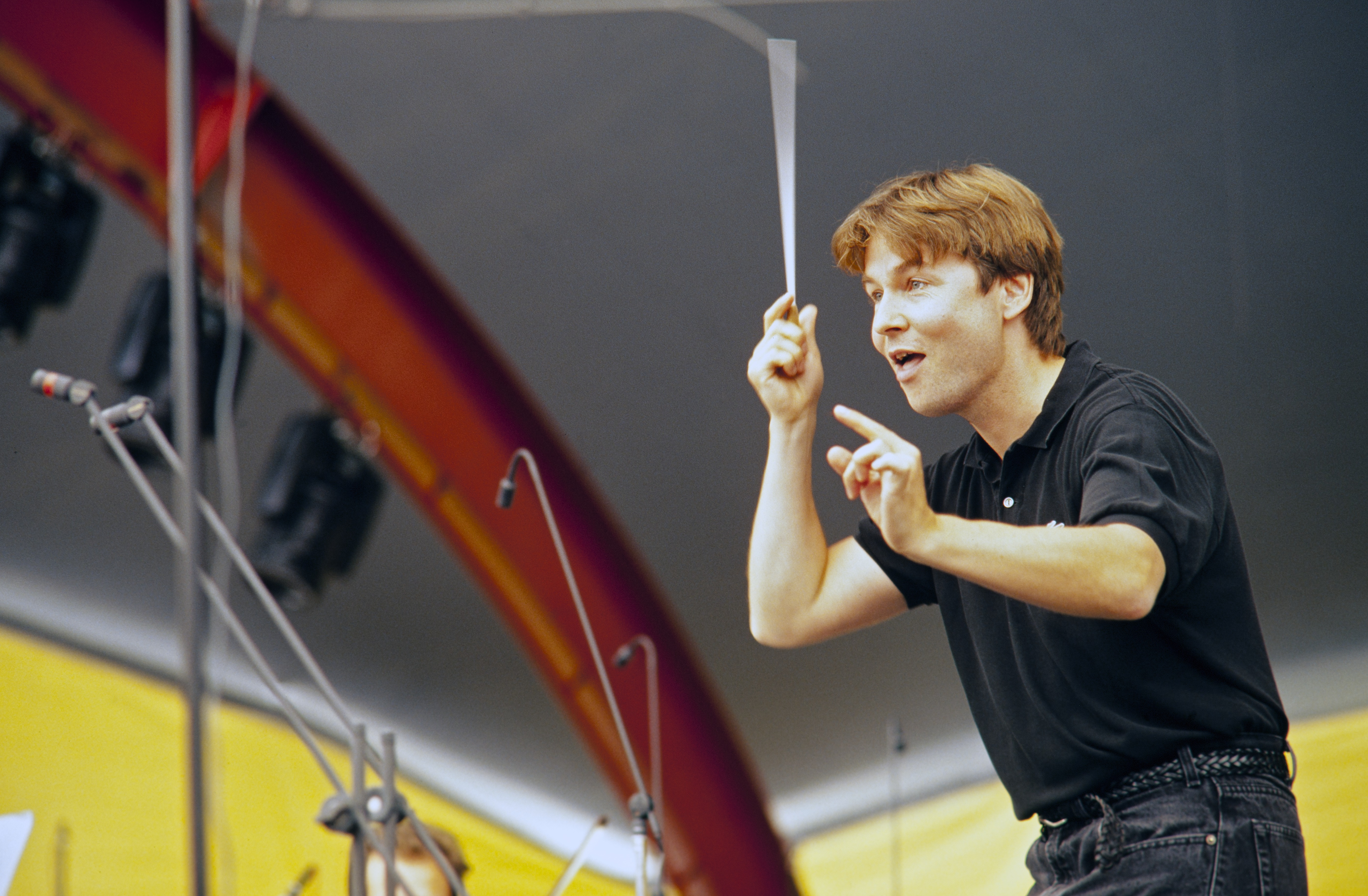
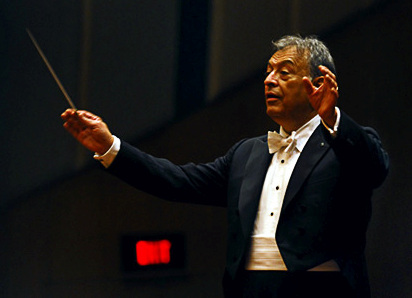
- From left: Gustavo Dudamel, Esa-Pekka Salonen, and Zubin Mehta
- Period: Contemporary
- Composed: 2019
- Scoring: Orchestra

Premiere
- Date: October 24, 2019
- Location: Walt Disney Concert Hall
- Conductor: Gustavo Dudamel; Esa-Pekka Salonen; Zubin Mehta
- Performers: Los Angeles Philharmonic

From Space I Saw Earth is a composition for orchestra and three conductors by the Icelandic composer Daníel Bjarnason. The piece was commissioned by the Los Angeles Philharmonic, and was premiered with Gustavo Dudamel, Esa-Pekka Salonen and Zubin Mehta to celebrate the orchestra's centennial on October 24, 2019.

== Background and composition ==
The Los Angeles Philharmonic has performed under its last three principal conductors – Zubin Mehta, Esa-Pekka Salonen, and Gustavo Dudamel – for nearly three-fifths of its history. For its Centennial Birthday Celebration Concert & Gala, the organization commissioned Daníel Bjarnason to compose a piece in which all three conductors would perform with the orchestra simultaneously. (Mehta claims that a piece for three conductors was his idea.)

Daníel (Note: Icelandic surnames are patronymic; it is proper to address Icelandic people by their given names, not simply by the reference to their father (here: Bjarnason).) said that From Space I Saw Earth is his third work to be inspired by the Apollo 11 Moon landing and the Space Race, and that the title is also in reference to the overview effect. He has described the piece as "one piece of music which is running on parallel timelines that are constantly diverting, coming together and diverting again".

The orchestra is divided into three groups, with one conductor leading each. For the most part, each group is intended to work independently; each of the conductors (along with their respective groups) performs at a slightly different tempo, and an element of indeterminacy is built into the piece. However, the conductors do sometimes realign with one another at fermatas in the music, after which one conductor cues the others to proceed. Because of this, the three groups are positioned in a triangle (two toward the back of the stage, and one at the front), so that the conductors can see one another. For the premiere, Dudamel's group, which was at the front of the stage, consisted of the orchestra's string section with one percussionist; Mehta and Salonen's groups, at the back of the stage, were each made up of a mix of woodwinds, brass, and percussion.

At the end of the piece, musicians walk down the aisles playing crotales. At the premiere, this role was given to Youth Orchestra Los Angeles teachers and students.

== Performance and recording ==
From Space I Saw Earth was premiered by the Los Angeles Philharmonic with Dudamel, Salonen, and Mehta at their Centennial Concert on October 24, 2019. On May 8, 2020, this concert was broadcast on an episode of PBS' series Great Performances. A live recording of the concert was also released on DVD by Naxos.
