= Viola Concerto (Harbison) =

Viola concerto by John Harbison

The Concerto for Viola and Orchestra is a viola concerto by the American composer John Harbison. The work was commissioned by the Saint Paul Chamber Orchestra, the Los Angeles Chamber Orchestra, and the New Jersey Symphony Orchestra with contributions from Meet The Composer and Reader's Digest. It was first performed by Jaime Laredo and the New Jersey Symphony Orchestra under the direction of Hugh Wolff on May 18, 1990.

== Composition ==
=== Background ===
Harbison had an early interest in the viola, describing it as his "instrument of choice" as a child. He later wrote in score program notes, "It had a commanding awkward size, a somewhat veiled slightly melancholic tone quality, and it seemed always in the middle of things, a good vantage point for a composer (which I already wanted to be)." However, Harbison was instructed to start on the violin due to the instrument's smaller size. He recalled, "When it was clear I would never have large hands I insisted on switching [to viola] anyway and my first summer as a violist was spent in an informal chamber music group playing Haydn quartets. That summer in Princeton New Jersey I remember as my happiest, the company of my friend John Sessions in the quartet, the wonderful music we were exploring, and the rich possibilities of the instrument I had always wanted to play." Harbison said he "never became an outstanding violist," but remarked, "When it came to writing a concerto for viola I wrote for the violist I never was, the true soloist, and for the instrumental timbres I felt to be most typical of the instrument, its tenor and alto voice, rather than its rather unnatural treble."

The composer further described the concerto, saying, "The piece moves from inwardness to ebullience and from ambiguous and shifting harmonic language to a kind of tonality. Within this broad scenario there was room for the kind of paradoxes I enjoy: a first movement in which nothing seems capable of repetition followed by one with literal repeats, a third movement of great formal and metrical simplicity followed by a finale filled with intricate metrical modulations."

=== Structure ===
The concerto has a duration of approximately 20 minutes and is composed in four movements:

1. Con moto, rubato
2. Allegro brillante
3. Andante
4. Molto allegro, gioioso

=== Instrumentation ===
The work is scored for a solo viola and an orchestra consisting of two flutes (2nd doubling piccolo), two oboes (2nd doubling English horn), clarinet, bass clarinet, two bassoons (2nd doubling contrabassoon), two horns, two trumpets, timpani, percussion, celesta, harp, and strings.

== Reception ==
The viola concerto has been praised by music critics. Reviewing the world premiere, James R. Oestreich of The New York Times wrote:

The quick movements, especially the dynamic second and the skittish fourth, are taut and gripping. The Adagio third movement - Mr. Harbison's paean to the viola, perhaps - is moving in a central hymnlike episode, but eventually the soloist's peregrinations come to seem a bit indulgent. The finale appealingly stands Stravinsky on his head, as a brittle, polished Neo-Classical manner becomes increasingly overrun by rough rhythmic interjections until in the end the primitivist of Sacre du Printemps emerges.

Andrew Farach-Colton of Gramophone compared the work favorably to Walter Piston's Viola Concerto, writing, "Harbison's Concerto is if anything even darker in mood, though it's more luminously scored." He added, "The first movement has an improvisatory air (note, for example, the spontaneous-sounding chirping of woodwinds that accompany the viola's opening solo) that stands in stark contrast with the obsessive character of the brief scherzo-like movement that follows. The composer writes that the concerto 'moves from inwardness to ebullience and from an ambiguous and shifting harmonic language to tonality' – a dramatic structure similar to Piston's." In 2009, the music Mark Swed of the Los Angeles Times said the piece "doesn't get the attention it deserves."
