= Daníel Bjarnason =

Icelandic composer and conductor (born 1979)

- Born: 26 February 1979 (age 47); Iceland
- Genres: Classical, experimental
- Occupations: Composer; conductor
- Label: Bedroom Community
- Website: www.danielbjarnason.com

Daníel Bjarnason (born 26 February 1979) is an Icelandic composer and conductor. He has garnered widespread acclaim for his debut album, Processions (2010), with TimeOut NY writing he "create(s) a sound that comes eerily close to defining classical music's undefinable brave new world".

== Life and career ==
Born on 26 February 1979, Daníel studied composition, piano and conducting in Reykjavik, before going on to further study orchestral conducting at the Hochschule für Musik Freiburg. He has had a number of works commissioned and debuted by Los Angeles Philharmonic.

Daníel is currently composer-in-residence at the Muziekgebouw Frits Philips, Eindhoven, Netherlands and was artist-in-residence with Iceland Symphony Orchestra from 2015 to 2018. He has also collaborated with artists from many different genres, including Ben Frost, Sigur Rós and Brian Eno.

Various conductors have also performed Daníel's work, including Gustavo Dudamel, John Adams, André de Ridder, James Conlon, Louis Langrée and Ilan Volkov.

Daníel's recent work has included collaborations with the Los Angeles Philharmonic, Rambert Dance Company, Britten Sinfonia, Cincinnati Symphony Orchestra, So Percussion and the Calder Quartet. In August 2017, he acted as a co-curator, composer and conductor at the Los Angeles Philharmonic's Reykjavik Festival.

== Awards ==
Daníel has won numerous awards at the Icelandic Music Awards, including Song of the Year (2015) for "Ek ken di nag" and Composer of the Year, 2013 for his works The Isle Is Full of Noises and Over Light Earth. Over Light Earth (2013) won the Icelandic Music Award for the best classical CD of the year in 2013. Also in 2013, he and Ben Frost won the Edda Award for best soundtrack for their score to film The Deep, directed by Baltasar Kormákur. In 2010, Daníel nominated for the prestigious Nordic Council's Music Prize, and won the Kraumur Music Award. Daníel has also been awarded a grant from the Kristján Eldjárn Memorial Fund.

== Discography ==
=== Albums ===
- Processions (2010) – Bedroom Community
- Sólaris (with Ben Frost) (2011) – Bedroom Community
- Over Light Earth (2013) – Bedroom Community
- Djúpið (2017) – Bedroom Community

=== Works ===
==== Solo and small chamber works ====
- 5 Chinese Poems (2001)
- 4 Seasons of Yosa Buson (2003)
- Skelja (2006)
- Fanfare for Harpa (2011)
- Four Anachronisms (2012)
- Qui Tollis (2013)
- Ek Ken Die Nag (2014)
- Stillshot (2015)

==== Ensemble and chamber orchestra ====
- All Sounds to Silence Come (2007)
- Over Light Earth (2012)

==== Orchestra ====
- Emergence (2011)
- Blow Bright (2013)
- Collider (2015)
- From Space I Saw Earth for three conductors (2019)

==== Solo with ensemble/orchestra ====
- Solitudes (2003)
- Sleep Variations (2005)
- Processions (2009)
- Bow to String (2010)
- Sólaris (2011)
- The Bells (2021)

==== Chorus ====
- Enn fagnar heimur (2011)
- Ek Ken Die Nag (2014)

==== Chorus and orchestra ====
- The Isle Is Full of Noises (2012)

==== Solo voice with ensemble ====
- Larkin Songs (2010)

==== Operas ====
- Brothers (2017)
- Agnes (TBA)

==== Film scores ====
- Reykjavik Guesthouse (2003)
- Come To Harm (2011)
- The Deep (2012)
- Under the Tree (2017)
- The Last Whale Singer (2026)

==== Music for dance ====
- Smáljón í sjónmáli (2011)
- Frames – Alexander Whitley/Rambert (2015)

==== Collaborations ====
- Efterklang (Arranging for and performing in live project "Efterklang, Daníel Bjarnason and their Messing Orchestra")
- Ben Frost (Sólaris, The Deep)
- Olivia Pedroli (Arranging for and appearing on albums The Den and A Thin Line)
- Ólöf Arnalds (Arrangements on albums Við og við and Innundir skinni)
- Hjaltalín (Arranging for and performing in live project "Alpanon" with Iceland Symphony Orchestra)
- Sigur Rós (Arrangements on albums Valtari and Kveikur)
