= Nobuko Imai =

Japanese violist

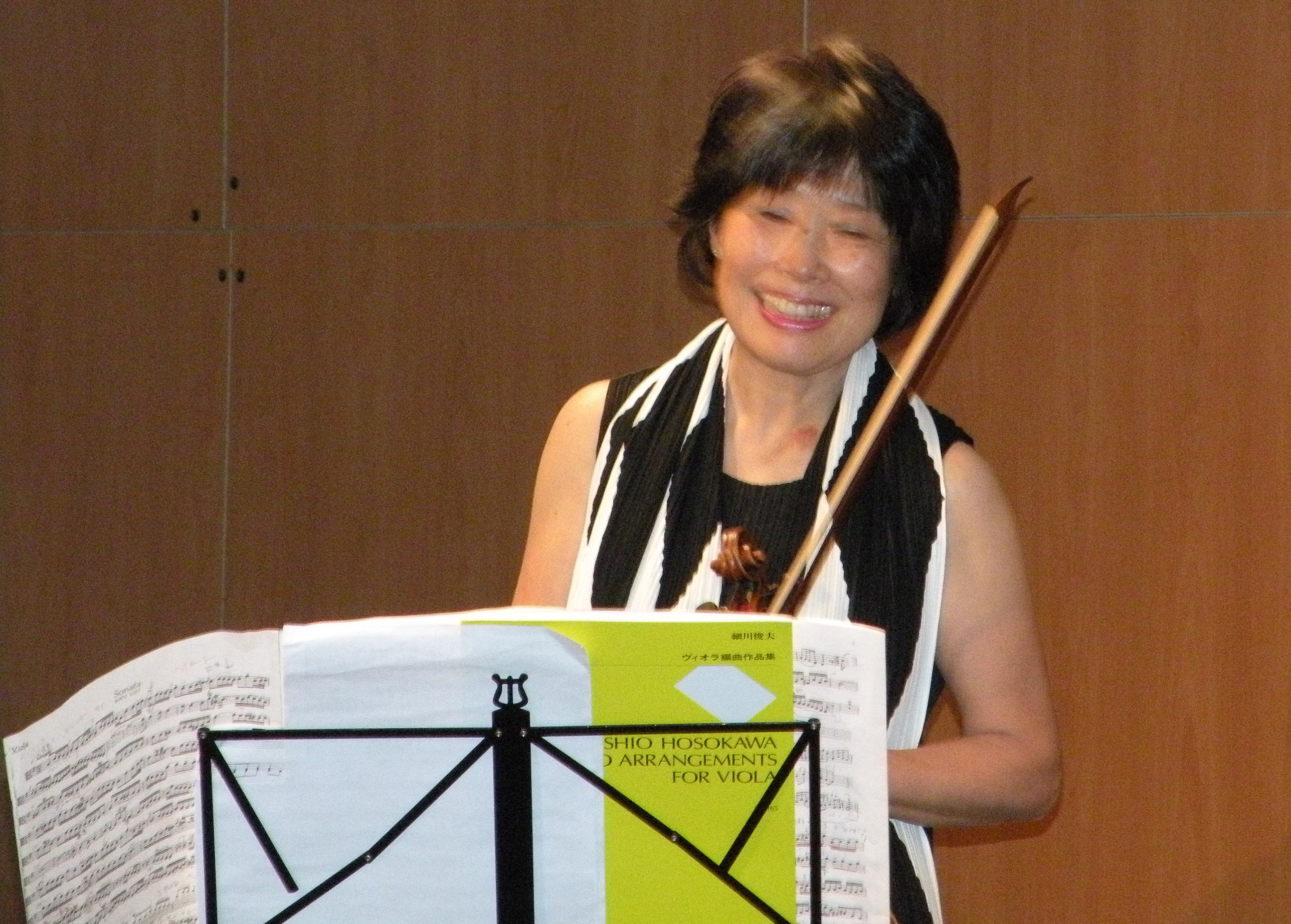
- At La Folle Journée in Nantes, 2009
- Born: March 18, 1943 (age 83); Tokyo, Japan
- Occupation: violist

Nobuko Imai (今井 信子, Imai Nobuko; born March 18, 1943) is a Japanese classical violist with a career as soloist and chamber musician. Since 1988 she has played a 1690 Andrea Guarneri instrument.

== Biography ==
Born in Tokyo, Imai began her musical training at the age of six. She began studying at Tokyo's Toho Gakuen School of Music and switched to viola there. Then she went to the United States where she studied at the Juilliard School and Yale University. She won the Young Concert Artists International Auditions in 1967 and won highest prize at both the Geneva International Music Competition and ARD International Music Competition at Munich.

Imai has worked in chamber music projects with artists such as Martha Argerich, Kyung-Wha Chung, Heinz Holliger, Mischa Maisky, Midori, Sir Colin Davis, Tsuyoshi Tsutsumi, Murray Perahia, Gidon Kremer, Yo Yo Ma, Itzhak Perlman, András Schiff, Isaac Stern and Pinchas Zukerman, and appeared as soloist with the Berlin Philharmonic Orchestra, Royal Concertgebouw Orchestra, Vienna Symphony Orchestra, Royal Stockholm Philharmonic Orchestra, London Symphony Orchestra, the BBC Symphony Orchestra, Boston Symphony Orchestra, and Chicago Symphony Orchestra. She is a former member of the Vermeer Quartet and is the founder and a member of the Michaelangelo Quartet, where she performs together with Mihaela Martin, Daniel Austrich and Frans Helmerson. For young musicians from Japan and the Netherlands, she founded the East West Baroque Academy.

Imai's discography includes more than 30 releases on labels such as BIS, Chandos, DG, EMI, Hyperion, and Philips. She has been a recipient of numerous awards including the Avon Arts Award (1993), Japan's Suntory Music Award (1995) and Mainichi Award of Arts (1996).

Toru Takemitsu composed for her a Viola Concerto A String Around Autumn in 1989.

On 24 October 1974, Nobuko Imai appeared with a Japanese combined orchestra which included the Toho Gakuen School of Music Orchestra and members of the Japan Philharmonic with conductor Seiji Ozawa and cellist Tsuyoshi Tsutsumi in a world-wide telecast (carried on the PBS television network in the U.S.) from the United Nations building in New York City. In the concert, she performed the viola solo in Strauss' Don Quixote.

Imai recorded the viola solo in Sir Colin Davis' 1975 recording of Berlioz' Harold in Italy, which was much praised by music critics.

In May 2023, BBC Music Magazine listed Imai amongst the twelve greatest violists of all time. The twelve listed, were: Wolfgang Amadeus Mozart, Carl Stamitz, Lionel Tertis, Rebecca Clarke, Paul Hindemith, William Primrose, Nobuko Imai, Kim Kashkashian, Yuri Bashmet, Tabea Zimmermann, Lawrence Power and Timothy Ridout.

== Teaching ==
Between 1983 and 2003 Imai taught as a professor at the Hochschule für Musik Detmold. She currently teaches at the Conservatory of Amsterdam (website of conservatory), at the Conservatoire Supérieur et Académie de Musique Tibor Varga in Sion, Switzerland, at the Conservatoire Supérieur de Musique de Genève in Geneva (website of conservatory) and at the Reina Sofía School of Music in Madrid.

== Literary works ==
- Akogare: Viola Totomoni (憧れ ヴィオラとともに), Shunjusha (2007, 2013)
