= Unearth, Release =

Unearth, Release is a viola concerto by the American composer Julia Adolphe. The work was commissioned by the League of American Orchestras and the New York Philharmonic with support from the Virginia B. Toulmin Foundation. It was first performed on July 16, 2016, at Guilford College by the violist Cynthia Phelps and Eastern Music Festival Orchestra under Gerard Schwarz. Adolphe later revised the work, however, and the revised version was given its premiere on November 17, 2016, at David Geffen Hall by Phelps and the New York Philharmonic conducted by Jaap van Zweden. Adolphe dedicated the piece Cynthia Phelps and the New York Philharmonic.

== Composition ==
Adolphe completed Unearth, Release in 2016 at the age of 28 while pursuing her doctorate at the USC Thornton School of Music. The concerto has a duration of roughly 19 minutes and is cast in three movements:

1. Captive Voices
2. Surface Tension
3. Embracing Mist

=== Instrumentation ===
The work is scored for a solo viola and an orchestra consisting of two flutes (2nd doubling alto flute and piccolo), two oboes (2nd doubling English horn), two clarinets (2nd doubling bass clarinet), two bassoons (2nd doubling contrabassoon), four horns, two trumpets, two trombones, bass trombone, tuba, timpani, two percussionists, piano, harp, and strings.

== Reception ==
Unearth, Release received a positive response from music critics. It was praised by Anthony Tommasini of The New York Times and Eric C. Simpson of the New York Classical Review wrote, "Adolphe has an expressive voice that combines strong melodic writing with atmospheric orchestration." He added, "The concerto in total is only nineteen minutes long, but it is a complex, evocative work, and marks an important success for its 28-year-old composer." Justin Davidson of Vulture further remarked:

Adolphe, who at 28 qualifies as a bona fide phenom, has written a concerto that captures the fragile clarity of twilight. The viola does not naturally rocket above a low accompaniment or pierce a thick fortissimo. It's never the loudest, highest, or lowest voice in the room. Instead, it must achieve prominence through charm and negotiation. That’s a job for Cynthia Phelps, the orchestra's stupendous section leader, and Adolphe helps her by threading the dark, velvety viola through a shadowed orchestral landscape. The soloist flaps like a bat against a window in the first movement and skips lightly over the waves in the second. But it's the final movement that lingers longest in the mind, the viola curling softly on a vaporous pillow of strings. I did not know while I was hearing that passage that Adolphe had subtitled it "Embracing Mist," but I didn't need to: The score conjures the image with wondrous precision, even without an assist from program notes.
