= Walter Henry Rothwell =

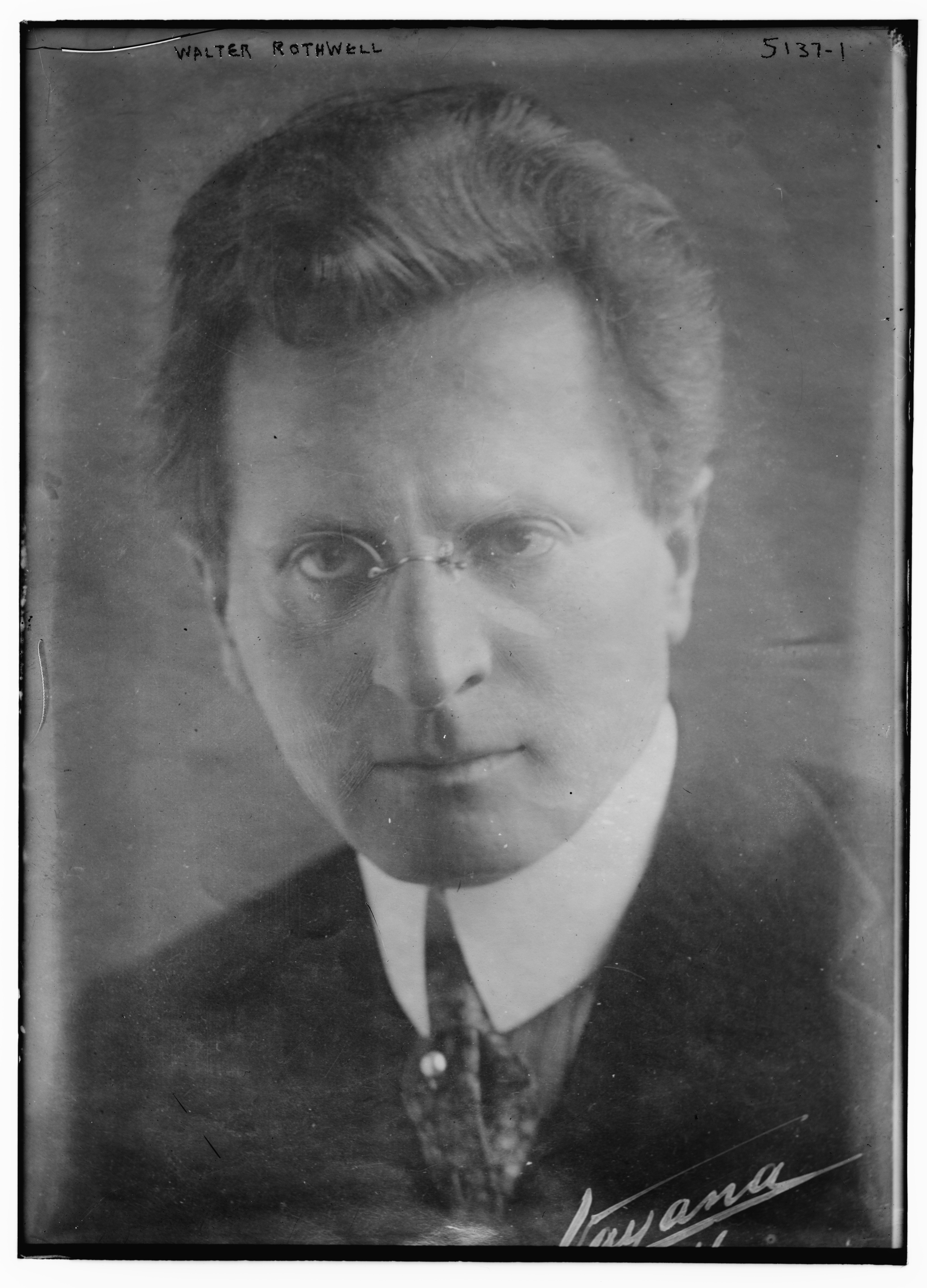
Walter Henry Rothwell circa 1920

Walter Henry Rothwell (22 September 1872 – 13 March 1927) was an English conductor.

== Biography ==
He was born in London on 22 September 1872 to an English father and an Austrian mother.

After initial training from his mother, who had been a piano pupil of Friedrich Wieck, he entered the Royal Academy of Music in Vienna at the age of nine. On graduating from the academy he undertook further studies in piano and composition in Vienna before becoming a coach at the Court Opera in that city. In this role he was discovered by an impresario named Pollini who brought him to Hamburg where he was assistant conductor to Gustav Mahler.

After a two-year apprenticeship under Mahler, Rothwell left Hamburg to conduct operatic performances in many European cities, becoming director of the Royal Opera in Amsterdam. In 1904-5 he went on a large tour of the United States with the Henry W. Savage company conducting Parsifal by Wagner: this was so successful that he later undertook a similar tour of Madama Butterfly by Puccini (eventually marrying Elizabeth Wolff, the soprano in the latter work's title role).

He returned to Europe to conduct opera in Frankfurt, but soon sought release to take the podium of the St Paul Symphony Orchestra, deciding that he preferred symphonic conducting to opera. He conducted this orchestra for seven years until it was disbanded because of financial problems resulting from the United States' entry into World War I. He moved to New York City and focused on teaching and guest conducting appointments.

In the summer of 1919, Rothwell became the first music director of the Los Angeles Philharmonic, chosen by founder William Andrews Clark, Jr. after the position was declined by Sergei Rachmaninoff.

He continued in this position until 13 March 1927 when he died of a heart attack while driving to the beach at Santa Monica, California where he often would go to study music scores.
