= Julia Adolphe =

American classical composer (born 1988)

Julia Adolphe (born May 16, 1988 in New York City) is an American composer of contemporary classical music. Her works include choral, orchestral, operatic, chamber and art song pieces.

Her initial mainstream recognition was in November 2016 at the New York premiere of her viola concerto Unearth, Release, which was co-commissioned by the New York Philharmonic and the League of American Orchestras. Adolphe has a Bachelor of Arts from Cornell University and a Master of Music degree in music composition from USC and is pursuing her doctoral degree from the USC Thornton School of Music.

She is the niece of composer Bruce Adolphe.

== Awards, prizes and grants ==
List of Awards
Morton Gould Young Composer Award
Theodore Front Prize
Jimmy McHugh Composition Prize
John James Blackmore Prize
John S. Knight Prize
American Composers Forum Grant
New Music USA Grant
Sam Spiegel Foundation Grant
Anna Sosenko Assist Trust Grant
Puffin Foundation Grant

== List of compositions ==
=== Opera ===
Year	Title
2012	Sylvia
In Progress	A Barrel of Laughs, A Vale of Tears

=== Orchestral ===
Year	Title
2014	Dark Sand, Sifting Light for orchestra
2016	Unearth, Release for viola and orchestra
2017	Shiver and Bloom for chamber orchestra
2017	White Stone for orchestra
2018	Underneath the Sheen for orchestra
2020	Paper Leaves on Fields of Clay for orchestra
2021	Woven Loom, Silver Spindle for violin and orchestra
2022	Makeshift Castle for orchestra
2023	Crown of Hummingbirds for chorus and orchestra
2025	Chrysalis for cello and orchestra
2026	We the Living for chorus and string orchestra

=== Choral ===
Year	Title
2016	Sea Dream Elegies for SATB chorus, oboe/English horn, and cello
2016	Whispers of Jasmine for SATB chorus
2017	Equinox for SATB chorus

=== Chamber ===
Year	Title
2009	White Flag for solo cello
2010	Between the Accidental for string quartet
2011	I Felt a Cleaving for soprano, mezzo-soprano, flute, oboe, bass clarinet, and piano
2013	Wordless Creatures for flute/alto flute, clarinet/bass clarinet, trumpet, percussion, harp, piano, violin, cello, and double bass
2014	Nine Lives for flute/alto flute/piccolo, oboe/English horn, clarinet/bass clarinet, violin, and cello
2014	Veil of Leaves for string quartet
2016	Footsteps for soprano, harp, viola, and Persian daf
2016	Moonlight Trio for soprano, two mezzo-sopranos, flute/alto flute, cello, and piano

=== Art song ===
Year	Title
2008	If Only She for mezzo-soprano and piano
2009	I Wish it Were T. S. Eliot for tenor and piano
2012	Noon, Not a Sound for mezzo-soprano and piano
2012	To Dissolve for tenor and piano
2015	Footsteps for soprano and piano
