= Viola Concerto (Kernis) =

2014 Viola Concerto by Aaron Jay Kernis

Aaron Jay Kernis's Viola Concerto was composed between 2013 and 2014 for the violist Paul Neubauer on a commission from the Saint Paul Chamber Orchestra, the Idyllwild Arts Academy, the Chautauqua Institution, and the Los Angeles Chamber Orchestra. Its world premiere was given by Neubauer and the Saint Paul Chamber Orchestra conducted by Roberto Abbado in Saint Paul, Minnesota, on April 24, 2014. The score is dedicated to Neubauer "with deepest admiration."

== Composition ==
=== Background ===
The concerto was written especially for Paul Neubauer, with whom had Kernis previously collaborated on his 1993 piano quartet Still Movement with Hymn. In the score program note, Kernis wrote, "In some ways this new concerto follows up on the tone of that piece. I have always been drawn to the soulful character of the viola, and have been excited to write this work from the moment Paul requested it."

=== Structure ===
The piece lasts about 27 minutes and is cast in three movements:

1. Braid
2. Romance
3. A Song My Mother Taught Me

The first movement is named for a series of weaving harmonies and melodies. The second movement is named after a series of piano pieces written by Clara Schumann titled "Romanze." The final movement contains musical quotes from Clara's husband Robert Schumann's 4 Klavierstücke, Op. 32, No. 4 and the popular Yiddish folk song "Tumbalalaika," which the composer's mother sang to him as a child.

=== Instrumentation ===
The work is scored for solo viola and an orchestra comprising two flutes (1st doubling two anvils; 2nd doubling piccolo), two oboes, two clarinets (1st doubling E♭ clarinet; 2nd doubling bass clarinet), two bassoons (2nd doubling keyboard melodica), two horns, two trumpets (both doubling keyboard melodicas), two percussionists, and strings.

== Reception ==
Reviewing the world premiere, Michael Anthony of the Star Tribune described the viola concerto as "a large three-movement work with vividly contrasting colors and carefully worked-out structures that offers the viola—as well as the orchestra—ample technical challenges along with numerous opportunities to show off the instrument's unique, dark sound. Passages of intense lyricism, especially in the movement marked 'Romance,' approach a kind of ecstasy that is one of the hallmarks of Kernis's music." He added, "Kernis has given the musical world something it needs: a viola concerto — and a good one." Mark Swed of the Los Angeles Times similarly called the piece "a traditional three-movement work for a solo instrument, but instead of a series of dramatic instances, it expresses a deep-seated goal. That goal is to explore the substance behind the Yiddish folk song 'Tumbalalaika.' It begins as a young man's simple quest for romance, which is ultimately a search for the meaning of life and death. Happiness, he must accept, is ever fleeting." He continued, "Music, here, serves as an illuminating metaphor for happiness. A song we might try to hold onto throughout our lives (as Kernis has with 'Tumbalalaika,' which was sung to him by his mother) can never be separated from its history or from the lives we lead."

== Recording ==
A recording of the concerto performed by Neubauer and the Royal Northern Sinfonia conducted by Rebecca Miller was released through Signum Records on January 26, 2018.
