= List of compositions by Ralph Vaughan Williams =

Vaughan Williams c. 1921, portrait by E. O. Hoppé

This is a list of compositions by Ralph Vaughan Williams.

== Operas ==
- Hugh the Drover, or Love in the Stocks (1910–14; revised 1924, 1933, 1956). Romantic ballad opera in 2 acts, with libretto by Harold Child (later revised by Ralph and Ursula Vaughan Williams)
  - A Cotswold Romance, Cantata for tenor, soprano, baritone, chorus and orchestra, adapted from Hugh the Drover by M. Jackson (1950)
- Sir John in Love (1924–28). Opera in 4 acts, based on The Merry Wives of Windsor by Shakespeare with interpolations from other authors.
  - In Windsor Forest, Cantata for chorus and orchestra, adapted from Sir John in Love (1931)
  - Fantasia on "Greensleeves" for strings and harp, adapted from Sir John in Love by Ralph Greaves (1889-1966) in 1934;
- The Poisoned Kiss, or The Empress and the Necromancer (1927–29; revisions 1936–37 and 1956–57). Romantic Extravaganza in 3 acts, with libretto by Evelyn Sharp (later amended by Ralph and Ursula Vaughan Williams)
- Riders to the Sea (1925–32), from the play by J. M. Synge
- The Pilgrim's Progress (1909–51). Morality in Prologue, 4 acts and Epilogue, based on John Bunyan's allegory
  - The Shepherds of the Delectable Mountains (1921). Libretto: Ralph Vaughan Williams (from John Bunyan) (Later incorporated, save for the final section, into The Pilgrim's Progress)
  - "Seven Songs from The Pilgrim's Progress" for voice and piano (1952)
  - "The 23rd Psalm" for soprano and chorus, arranged by John Churchill (1953)
  - Pilgrim's Journey, Cantata for soprano, tenor, baritone, chorus and orchestra adapted from The Pilgrim's Progress by Christopher Morris and Roy Douglas (1962)
- Thomas the Rhymer, Opera in 3 acts to libretto by Ursula Vaughan Williams, based on traditional ballads Thomas the Rhymer and Tam Lin. Uncompleted.

== Incidental music ==
- The Wasps (1909): to Aristophanes's play The Wasps, Overture and 17 items
  - Aristophanic Suite for orchestra (1912)
- The Bacchae (1911): to Euripides's tragedy
- The Death of Tintagiles (1913): to Maurice Maeterlinck's 1894 play
- Incidental music to Shakespeare's plays (1913): The Merry Wives of Windsor; Richard II, Henry IV Part 2, Richard III, Henry V
- The First Nowell (1958): nativity play adapted from medieval pageants by Simona Pakenham; score completed by Roy Douglas

== Ballets ==
- Old King Cole (1923) for orchestra and optional chorus
- On Christmas Night (1926): masque adapted from A Christmas Carol by Charles Dickens
- Job: A Masque for Dancing (1930)
  - The Voice out of the Whirlwind, Motet for mixed choir and organ or orchestra; adapted from "Galliard of the Sons of the Morning" from Job
- The Running Set (1933): Traditional Dance Tunes for orchestra
- The Bridal Day (1938–39): masque founded on Epithalamion by Edmund Spenser
  - Revised as Epithalamion (1957), Cantata for baritone, chorus and small orchestra

== Orchestral ==
- Symphonies
  - Symphony No. 1 A Sea Symphony (1903–1909) (with chorus, on texts by Whitman)
  - Symphony No. 2 A London Symphony (1911–13; revised 1918, 1920 and 1933)
  - Symphony No. 3 Pastoral Symphony (1921)
  - Symphony No. 4 in F minor (1931–34)
  - Symphony No. 5 in D major (1938–43)
  - Symphony No. 6 in E minor (1944–47, rev. 1950)
  - Symphony No. 7 Sinfonia antartica (1949–52) (partly based on his music for the film Scott of the Antarctic)
  - Symphony No. 8 in D minor (1953–55)
  - Symphony No. 9 in E minor (1956–57)
- Serenade in A minor (1898)
- Heroic Elegy and Triumphal Epilogue (1900)
- Bucolic Suite (1901)
- Burley Heath, impression for orchestra (1902–03)
- The Solent, impression for orchestra (1902–03)
- In the Fen Country, for orchestra (1904)
- Norfolk Rhapsody No. 1, for orchestra (1906, rev. 1914)
- Norfolk Rhapsody No. 2, for orchestra (1906, subsequently withdrawn; reconstructed and recorded in 2002 - see Norfolk Rhapsody No. 1)
- Harnham Down, impression for orchestra (1904–07)
- Fantasia on a Theme by Thomas Tallis (1910, rev. 1913 and 1919)
- Fantasia on "Greensleeves" (1934) (for string orchestra and harp; arranged by Ralph Greaves from Vaughan Williams's treatment of folk tunes in his opera Sir John in Love)
- Two Hymn Tune Preludes (1936) for small orchestra: 1. Eventide; 2. Dominus regit me
- Five Variants of Dives and Lazarus (1939) for strings and harp
- Partita for Double String Orchestra (1948), rewritten from Double Trio for string sextet with new finale
- Concerto Grosso, for three groups of strings, each requiring different levels of technical skill (1950)
- Flourish for Glorious John (1957)

== Concertante ==
- Fantasia for piano and orchestra (1896)
- The Lark Ascending for violin and orchestra (1914)
- Concerto Accademico for violin and string orchestra (1924–25)
- Flos Campi for viola, wordless chorus, and small orchestra (1925)
- Piano Concerto in C major (1926–31)
  - Arranged as Concerto for Two Pianos and Orchestra (1946) by Joseph Cooper in collaboration with the composer
- Fantasia on Sussex Folk Tunes (1929) for cello and orchestra; withdrawn by the composer
- Suite for Viola and Small Orchestra (1934)
- Sketches for Cello Concerto (1942–43); incomplete
  - 2nd movement completed by David Matthews (2009) as Dark Pastoral
- Oboe Concerto in A minor, for oboe and strings (1944)
- Concerto for Two Pianos and Orchestra (1946)
- Fantasia (quasi variazione) on the Old 104th Psalm Tune for piano, chorus, and orchestra (1949)
- Romance in D-flat major for harmonica and orchestra (1951) (written for Larry Adler)
- Tuba Concerto in F minor (1954)

== Choral ==
- Three Elizabethan Songs , partsongs for chorus 1. Sweet Day (setting by George Herbert) 2. The Willow Song (Othello) 3. O Mistress Mine (Twelfth Night) (1896)
- Come away, Death , partsong for SSATB. (1899)
- The Garden of Proserpine, cantata for soprano, chorus & orchestra, setting of Algernon Charles Swinburne (1899)
- A Cambridge Mass, Missa brevis for SATB, double chorus & orchestra (1899); Doctoral exercise, first performed 3 March 2011.
- "Rest", for unaccompanied SSATB (1902)
- Willow-Wood, Cantata for baritone, women's chorus and orchestra (1903, revised 1909), setting texts by Rossetti from The House of Life
- Toward the Unknown Region, song for chorus and orchestra, setting of Walt Whitman (1906)
- The truth sent from above arranged for unaccompanied chorus (1909)
- Five Mystical Songs for baritone, chorus, and orchestra, settings of George Herbert (1911)
- Fantasia on Christmas Carols for baritone, chorus, and orchestra (1912); arranged also for reduced orchestra of organ, strings, percussion)
- Five English Folk Songs freely arranged for Unaccompanied Chorus (1913)
  1. The Dark Eyed Sailor
  2. The Spring Time of the Year
  3. Just as the Tide was Flowing
  4. The Lover's Ghost
  5. Wassail Song
- O clap your hands, motet for chorus and orchestra, text from Psalm 47 (1920)
- Lord, thou hast been our refuge, motet for chorus, semi chorus and orchestra (or organ); text from Psalm 90 (1921)
- "Ca' the yowes" for tenor and chorus (1922), a setting of the folk song by Isabel Pagan/Robert Burns
- Mass in G minor for unaccompanied choir (1922)
- Sancta Civitas (The Holy City) oratorio, text mainly from the Book of Revelation (1923–25)
- Te Deum in G major (1928)
- Benedicite for soprano, chorus, and orchestra (1929)
- Three Choral Hymns (1929)
- Magnificat for contralto, women's chorus, and orchestra (1932)
- O How Amiable (1934) arrangement of a hymn for chorus and organ, originally written for the Abinger Pageant
- Five Tudor Portraits for contralto, baritone, chorus, and orchestra (1936)
- Dona nobis pacem, text by Walt Whitman and other sources (1936)
- Festival Te Deum for chorus and orchestra or organ (1937)
- Serenade to Music for sixteen solo voices and orchestra, a setting of Shakespeare, dedicated to Sir Henry Wood on the occasion of his Jubilee (1938)
- "Six Choral Songs To Be Sung In Time Of War" (1940)
- A Song of Thanksgiving (originally Thanksgiving for Victory) for narrator, soprano solo, children's chorus, mixed chorus, and orchestra (1944)
- An Oxford Elegy for narrator, mixed chorus, and small orchestra (1949)
- Folk Songs of the Four Seasons, Cantata for women's voices with orchestra or piano (1949).
  - Suite for small orchestra from Folk Songs of the Four Seasons, arranged by Roy Douglas (1956)
- Three Shakespeare Songs for SATB unaccompanied, composed for The British Federation of Music Festivals National Competitive Festival (1951)
- The Sons of Light (1950), Cantata for chorus and orchestra; text by Ursula Vaughan Williams
  - Sun, Moon and Stars (1955), Cycle of four songs from The Sons of Light with strings or piano
- O taste and see, a motet setting of Psalm 34:8. The original SATB version was composed for the Coronation of HM Queen Elizabeth II at Westminster Abbey in June 1953. (1953)
- Hodie, a Christmas cantata (1954)
- A Choral Flourish for unaccompanied SATB chorus, composed for a large choral event in the Royal Albert Hall at the invitation of (and dedicated to) Alan Kirby (c. 1952).
- Nine Carols for Male Voices arrangements made during the Second World War at the request of the British Council for performance by H.M. Forces in Iceland.

== Hymn tunes and carols ==
Vaughan Williams was the musical editor of the English Hymnal of 1906, and the co-editor with Martin Shaw of Songs of Praise of 1925 and the Oxford Book of Carols of 1928, all in collaboration with Percy Dearmer. In addition to arranging many pre-existing hymn tunes and creating hymn tunes based on folk songs, he wrote several original hymn tunes:

- Original hymn tunes included in The English Hymnal (1906)
  - "Come Down, O Love Divine": entitled Down Ampney in honour of Vaughan Williams's birthplace
  - "God Be With You Till We Meet Again" (Randolph)
  - "Hail Thee, Festival day" (Salva festa dies)
  - "For All the Saints" (Sine nomine)
- Original hymn tunes included in Songs of Praise (1925)
  - "Saviour, again to Thy dear name" (Magda)
  - "The night is come like to the day" (Oakley)
  - "Servants of God" (Cumnor)
  - "England Arise! the long, long night is over" (Guildford)
  - "At the Name of Jesus" (King's Weston)
- Original tunes included in Oxford Book of Carols (1928)
  - The Golden Carol ("Now is Christmas y-come")
  - Wither's Rocking Hymn ("Sweet baby, sleep!")
  - Snow in the Street ("From far away we come to you")
  - Blake's Cradle Song ("Sweet dreams, form a shade")
- Extra original hymn tunes included in the enlarged edition of Songs of Praise (1931)
  - "Into the woods my master went" (Mantegna)
  - "Servants of the great adventure" (Marathon)
  - "I vow to thee my country" (Abinger)
  - "Let us now praise famous men" (Famous Men)
  - "Fierce raged the tempest" (White Gates)

== Vocal ==
- "Summum bonum", song (1891), setting text by Browning
- "To daffodils", song (1895), setting text by Herrick
- "Dirge for Fidele", duet (1895), setting text by Shakespeare from Cymbeline, published 1922
- "Rondel", song (1896), setting text by Swinburne
- "How can the tree but wither", song (1896), setting text by Thomas, Lord Vaux
- "Claribel", song (1896), setting text by Tennyson
- "Linden Lea", song (1901); from the William Barnes poem “My Orcha’d in Lindèn Lea”
- "Blackmwore by the Stour", song (1902); from the William Barnes poem “Blackmwore Maïdens”
- "Boy Johnny", song (1902), setting text by Christina Rossetti
- "Whither Must I Wander", song (1902)
- "If I were a Queen", duet (1903), setting text by Christina Rossetti
- "When I am dead, my dearest", song (1903), setting text by Christina Rossetti
- "Tears, idle tears", song (1903), setting text by Tennyson
- "The Splendour Falls", song, setting text by Tennyson
- "The Winter's Willow", song (1903); from the William Barnes poem of the same name
- "Adieu", duet, translated from German by Arthur Foxton Ferguson (1903)
- "Think of Me", duet, translated from German by Arthur Foxton Ferguson (1903)
- "Orpheus with his Lute", song (1904), setting text by Shakespeare
- The House of Life, six sonnets by Dante Gabriel Rossetti (1904): 1. Lovesight; 2. Silent noon; 3. Love's minstrels; 4. Heart's haven; 5. Death-in-Love; 6. Love's last gift
- Two Vocal Duets, for soprano, baritone and violin with piano, setting texts by Walt Whitman (1904)
- Songs of Travel, song cycle for baritone and piano, setting texts by R. L. Stevenson (1901–04). Includes "The Vagabond".
  - Songs 1 3 8 arranged for baritone and orchestra (1905)
  - "I have trod the upward and the downward slope" was added to the original eight songs in 1960, after the composer's death
  - Songs 2 4 5 6 7 9 arranged for baritone & orchestra by Roy Douglas (1962)
- "Dreamland", song, setting text by Christina Rossetti (1906)
- "Nocturne", for baritone and orchestra, setting of "Whispers of Heavenly Death" by Walt Whitman (1908)
- "The Sky Above The Roof", song (1908), setting translation by Mabel Dearmer of Paul Verlaine poem 'Le ciel est pardessus le toit'
- On Wenlock Edge, song cycle (1909) for tenor, piano and string quartet, setting texts by A. E. Housman
- Four Hymns: (1914) for tenor and piano (or strings) with viola obbligato
- Merciless Beauty, three rondels for tenor, two violins and cello (1921)
- Four Poems by Fredegond Shove: for baritone and piano (1922–25): 1. Motion and Stillness; 2. Four Nights; 3. The New Ghost; 4. The Water Mill
- Two Poems by Seumas O'Sullivan (1925): 1. The Twilight People; 2. A Piper;
- Three Songs from Shakespeare (1925): 1. Take, O take those lips away; 2. When icicles hang by the wall; 3. Orpheus with his lute
- Three Poems by Walt Whitman for baritone and piano (1925): 1. Nocturne; 2. A Clear Midnight; 3. Joy, Shipmate, Joy!
- "Along the Field", for tenor and violin, setting texts by A. E. Housman (1927)
- "In the Spring", song (1952); from the William Barnes poem of the same name
- Ten Blake Songs, song cycle for high voice and oboe (1957), written for film The Vision of William Blake
- Four Last Songs (1954–58) to poems of Ursula Vaughan Williams: 1. Procris; 2. Tired; 3. Hands, Eyes and Heart; 4. Menelaus
- Three Vocalises (wordless) for soprano and clarinet (1958)

== Chamber ==
- String Quartet in C minor (1898)
- Quintet in D major for clarinet, horn, violin, cello, and piano (1898)
- Piano Quintet in C minor for violin, viola, cello, double bass and piano (1903)
- Scherzo for string quintet (1904)
- Nocturne & Scherzo for string quintet (1906)
- String Quartet No. 1 in G minor (1908)
- Phantasy Quintet for 2 violins, 2 violas, and cello (1912)
- Suite de Ballet for flute and piano (1913–24)
- Romance and Pastorale for violin and piano (1914)
- Romance for viola and piano (undated; possibly 1914)
- Six Studies in English Folk Song, for cello (or clarinet, violin, viola) and piano (1926)
- Double Trio for string sextet (1938): withdrawn and revised as Partita for Double String Orchestra
- Suite for Pipes (1939)
- Household Music: Three Preludes on Welsh Hymn Tunes for string quartet or other instruments (1941): 1. Fantasia, Crug-y-bar; 2. Scherzo, St. Denio; 3. Variation, Aberystwyth
- String Quartet No. 2 in A minor ("For Jean, on her birthday," 1942–44. Dedicated to the violist Jean Stewart)
- Sonata in A minor for violin and piano (1952)

== Keyboard ==
- Pezzo Ostinato for piano (1905)
- Three Preludes for Organ founded on Welsh hymn tunes (1920); 1. Bryn Calfaria, 2. Rhosymedre, 3. Hyfrydol
  - No. 2 & No. 3 arranged for orchestra by Arnold Foster
  - Arranged for two pianos by Leslie Russell (1939)
- Suite of Six Short Pieces for piano (1921)
  - Arranged for string orchestra by James Brown in collaboration with the composer as The Charterhouse Suite (1923)
- Prelude and Fugue in C minor for organ (1921)
  - Version for orchestra (1930)
- Hymn Tune Prelude on 'Song 13' by Orlando Gibbons for piano (1930)
  - Arranged for string orchestra by Helen Glatz
- Six Teaching Pieces for piano (1934)
- A Wedding Tune for Ann for organ (1943)
- A Winter Piece for piano (1943)
- Introduction and Fugue for two pianos (1947)
- The Old One Hundredth Psalm Tune, harmonisation and arrangement (1953)
- Two Organ Preludes founded on Welsh Folk Songs (1956): 1. Romanza, The White Rock; 2. Toccata, St. David's Day

== Film scores ==
- 49th Parallel, 1940, his first, talked into it by Muir Mathieson to assuage his guilt at being able to do nothing for the war effort
  - Song The New Commonwealth (1943) adapted from Prelude to 49th Parallel, words by Harold Child
  - The Lake in the Mountains for piano, based on episode from 49th Parallel (1947)
  - Prelude to 49th Parallel for orchestra, published 1960
- Coastal Command, 1942
- The People's Land, 1943
- The Flemish Farm, 1943
  - Suite The Story of a Flemish Farm in 7 movements (1945)
- Stricken Peninsula, 1945
- The Loves of Joanna Godden, 1946
- Scott of the Antarctic, 1948
  - Partially reused for his Sinfonia antartica (Symphony No. 7)
- The Dim Little Island, 1949
- Bitter Springs, 1950 (music composed jointly with Ernest Irving)
- The England of Elizabeth, 1955
  - Three Portraits from The England of Elizabeth: concert suite (1. Explorer; 2. Poet; 3. Queen) adapted by Muir Mathieson
  - Two Shakespeare Sketches from The England of Elizabeth adapted by Muir Mathieson

== Scores for radio ==
- BBC adaptation by Edward Sackville-West of John Bunyan's The Pilgrim's Progress, 1942
  - Some of this music was later used in the Morality Play The Pilgrim's Progress
- Richard II (1944); not used
- Incidental music to BBC production of Thomas Hardy's The Mayor of Casterbridge, 1951
  - Prelude on an Old Carol Tune (1953) was adapted from this incidental music

== Band ==
- Rhosymedre (transcription of his own organ prelude on a Welsh hymn tune) for concert band (1920)
- English Folk Songs, Suite for military band (1923)
  - Arranged for brass band by Gordon Jacob (1924)
  - Arranged for orchestra by Gordon Jacob (1942)
  - Arranged for piano by Michael Mullinar (1949)
- Sea Songs, Quick march for military and brass bands (1923)
  - Arranged by composer for orchestra (1942)
- Toccata Marziale for military band (1924)
- Overture: Henry V for brass band (1933/34)
- Flourish for Wind Band (1939)
- Prelude on Three Welsh Hymn Tunes for brass band (1955): 1. Ebenezer; 2. Calfaria; 3. Hyfrydol
- Variations for brass band (1957)
  - Arranged for orchestra by Gordon Jacob (1960)

== See also ==
- Kennedy, Michael: A Catalogue of the Works of Vaughan Williams
- List of works by category on the website of the Ralph Vaughan Williams Society
- The Da Capo Catalog of Classical Music Compositions
