= Viola repertoire =

Set of available musical works for viola

This article lists notable compositions within the viola repertoire.

== Viola alone ==
- Luciano Berio
  - Sequenza VI (1967)
- Bartolomeo Campagnoli
  - 41 Caprices for Viola (c. 1815)
- Franz Anton Hoffmeister
  - 12 Etudes for Viola (c. 1800)
- György Ligeti (1923–2006)
  - Sonata for Solo Viola (1994)
- Max Reger
  - 3 Suites for Solo Viola, Op. 131d

== Viola and piano ==
- Kurt Atterberg
  - Sonata in B minor for cello (or violin, or viola, or horn) and piano, Op. 27 (1925)
- Ludwig van Beethoven
  - Notturno in D major for viola and piano, Op. 42 (1803)
- Johannes Brahms
  - Sonata No. 1 in F minor for viola and piano, Op. 120 No. 1 (1894)
  - Sonata No. 2 in E♭ major for viola and piano, Op. 120 No. 2 (1894)
- Rebecca Clarke
  - Morpheus (1917)
  - Sonata for viola and piano (1919)
- Edward Elgar
  - Canto Popolare (1904)
- Paul Hindemith
  - Sonata in F for viola and piano, Op. 11 No. 4 (1919)
- Theodore Holland
  - Suite in D major for viola and piano (1938)
- Felix Mendelssohn
  - Viola sonata in C minor, MWV Q 14 (1824)
- Robert Schumann
  - Märchenbilder, Op. 113 (1851)
- Dmitri Shostakovich
  - Sonata for viola and piano, Op. 147 (1975)
- Henri Vieuxtemps
  - Élégie, Op. 30 (1848)
  - Sonata in B♭ major for viola and piano, Op. 36 (1862)
- Ralph Vaughan Williams
  - Romance for viola and piano (c. 1914)
- Graham Waterhouse
  - Sonata ebraica (2013)
- Henryk Wieniawski
  - Rêverie in F sharp minor (1885)

== Viola and other instruments ==
- Johann Sebastian Bach
  - Brandenburg Concerto No. 6 in B♭ major, BWV 1051 (1721)
- Ludwig van Beethoven
  - Serenade in D major for flute, violin and viola, Op. 25 (1795)
  - Duo in E♭ major for viola and cello, "mit zwei obligaten Augengläsern" ("with two obbligato eyeglasses"), WoO 32 (1796–97)
- Johannes Brahms
  - Two Songs for voice, viola and piano, Op. 91 (1884)
- Claude Debussy
  - Sonata for flute, viola and harp, L. 137 (1915)
- Michael Haydn
  - Duo for violin and viola in C major, Perger 127, MH 335
  - Duo for violin and viola in D major, Perger 128, MH 336
  - Duo for violin and viola in E major, Perger 129, MH 337
  - Duo for violin and viola in F major, Perger 130, MH 338
- Airat Ichmouratov
  - Three Romances for viola, strings and harp, Op. 22 (2009)
- Wolfgang Amadeus Mozart
  - Duo No. 1 in G major for violin and viola, K. 423 (1783)
  - Duo No. 2 in B♭ major for violin and viola, K. 424 (1783)
  - Kegelstatt Trio in E♭ major for clarinet, viola and piano, K. 498 (1786)
- Robert Schumann
  - Märchenerzählungen for clarinet, viola, and piano, Op. 132 (1853)
- Jean Sibelius
  - Duo for violin and viola, JS66 (1892)
- Ralph Vaughan Williams
  - Four Hymns for tenor, viola, and string orchestra (1914)
- Graham Waterhouse
  - Four Epigraphs after Escher for viola, heckelphone and piano, Op. 35 (1993)
- John Woolrich
  - Ulysses Awakes for viola and ten strings (1989)

== Viola and orchestra ==
- Julia Adolphe
  - Unearth, Release (2016)
- Henri Casadesus
  - Concerto in D major (1911) (attributed to C. P. E. Bach)
  - Concerto in B minor (1924) (attributed to George Frideric Handel)
  - Concerto in C minor (1942) (attributed to Johann Christian Bach)
- Béla Bartók
  - Concerto for viola and orchestra in A minor, Sz. 120, BB 128 (1945)
- Hector Berlioz
  - Harold en Italie, symphony for orchestra with viola obbligato, Op. 16, H. 68 (1834)
- Ernest Bloch
  - Suite Hébraïque for viola and piano or orchestra (1951)
- Max Bruch
  - Romanze for Viola, and Orchestra, Op. 85 (1911)
  - Concerto for clarinet, viola, and orchestra, Op. 88 (1911)
- Morton Gould
  - Concerto for viola and orchestra (1943)
- Jennifer Higdon
  - Concerto for viola and orchestra (2015)
- Paul Hindemith
  - Kammermusik No. 5 for viola and chamber orchestra, Op. 36 No. 4 (1927)
  - Der Schwanendreher for viola and small orchestra (1935)
  - Trauermusik for viola and orchestra (1936)
- Franz Anton Hoffmeister
  - Viola Concerto in D major (1799)
  - Viola Concerto in B♭ major (1799)
- Airat Ichmouratov
  - Viola Concerto No.1, Op.7 (2004)
- Peter Lieberson
  - Concerto for viola and orchestra (1992)
- James MacMillan
  - Concerto for viola and orchestra (2013)
- Wolfgang Amadeus Mozart
  - Sinfonia Concertante in E♭ major for violin, viola and orchestra, K. 364 (K. 320d) (1779)
- Nico Muhly
  - Concerto for viola and orchestra (2014)
- Walter Piston
  - Concerto for viola and orchestra (1957)
- Alfred Schnittke
  - Concerto for viola and orchestra (1985)
- Carl Stamitz
  - Concerto for viola in D major, Op. 1 (c. 1774)
- Richard Strauss
  - Don Quixote for cello, viola, and orchestra, Op. 35 (1897)
- Tōru Takemitsu
  - A String around Autumn for viola and orchestra (1989)
- Georg Philipp Telemann (1681–1767)
  - Concerto in G Major for viola and orchestra, TWV 51:G9
  - Concerto in G major for 2 violas and string orchestra, TWV 52:G3
- Ralph Vaughan Williams
  - Flos Campi for viola, wordless chorus, and small orchestra (1925)
  - Suite for viola and small orchestra (1933–1934)
- William Walton
  - Concerto for viola and orchestra in A minor (1928–1929)
