= Romance (music) =

Musical form of brief, simple melody

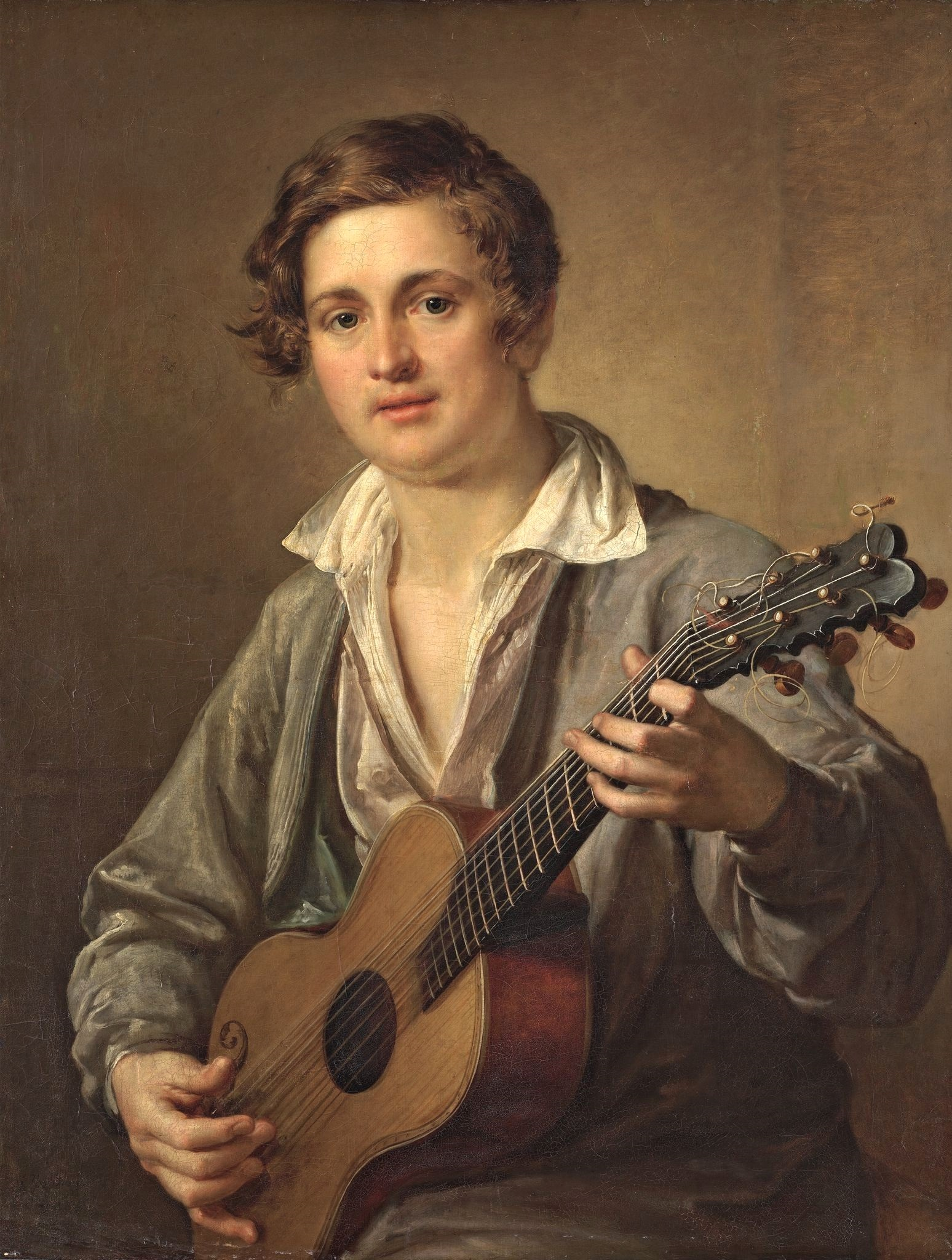
Russian Guitar Player, by Vasily Tropinin (1823)

The term romance (Spanish: romance/romanza, Italian: romanza, German: Romanze, French: romance, Russian: романс, Portuguese: romance, Romanian: romanţă) has a centuries-long history. Applied to narrative ballads in Spain, it came to be used by the 18th century for simple lyrical pieces not only for voice, but also for instruments alone. The Oxford Dictionary of Music states that "generally it implies a specially personal or tender quality".

== Instrumental music bearing the title "Romance" ==
Typically, a Classical piece or movement called a "Romance" is in three, meaning three beats in the bar.

- Amy Beach: Romance in A major, Op. 23, for violin and piano
- Ludwig van Beethoven: two violin romances (Romanzen) for violin and orchestra, No. 1 G major, Op. 40; No. 2 in F major, Op. 50 take the form of a loose theme and variations
- Johannes Brahms: Romanze in F major for piano, Op. 118, No. 5 (1893)
- Max Bruch: "Romance for Viola and Orchestra in F"
- Arthur Butterworth: Romanza for horn and string quartet with double bass ad libitum (or piano), Op. 12 (1951)
- Antonín Dvořák: Romance in F minor for violin and orchestra, Op. 11 (1873/1877)
- Edward Elgar:
  - Romance for bassoon and orchestra, Op. 62 (1910)
  - Enigma Variation XIII (Romanza: Moderato)
- Edvard Grieg: String Quartet No. 1 in G minor, Op. 27 (1878), second movement
- Erich Wolfgang Korngold: Romance from Concerto for violin and orchestra, second movement
- Miguel Llobet: Romanza
- Nikolai Medtner: Piano Sonata "Romantica" in B-flat minor, Op. 53, No. 1 (1929/1930), first movement
- Wolfgang Amadeus Mozart: Romanze from Eine Kleine Nachtmusik, the second movement; Piano Concerto No. 20, second movement
- Joseph Haydn: "Romance: Allegretto" from Symphony No. 85 in B♭, "La Reine," the second movement
- Romanza (Paganini-Ponce)
- Camille Saint-Saëns:
  - Romance in E major for cello and piano, from Suite for Cello and Piano Op. 16 (1862), later published as Op. 67 in 1866 as a standalone work for horn or cello and piano
  - Romance in F major for horn (or cello) and orchestra, Op. 36 (1874)
  - Romance in D-flat major for flute and piano (or orchestra), Op. 37 (1871)
  - Romance in D major for cello and orchestra, Op. 51 (1877)
- Clara Schumann: Drei Romanzen for violin and piano, Op. 22 (1853)
- Robert Schumann: Drei Romanzen (for piano), Op. 28 (1839)
- Robert Schumann: Drei Romanzen (for oboe or violin and piano), Op. 94 (1849)
- Dmitri Shostakovich: Romance from The Gadfly Suite
- Jean Sibelius: Romances for piano Op 24, Nos. 2, 5, and 9; Op. 78, No. 2
- Johan Svendsen: Romance for violin and orchestra, Op. 26 (1881)
- Ralph Vaughan Williams: Romanza, in his Tuba Concerto (1954), and Romance for viola and piano (unknown)
- Anonymous: "Romance/Romanza" for the classical guitar, known variously as Spanish Romance, Romance D'Amour, etc.

Mozart subtitled the second movement of his piano concerto no. 20 in D minor (K.466) "Romanze" and the second movement of his third horn concerto "Romance".

Franz Liszt wrote a Romance in E minor in 1842 in Moscow.

Robert Schumann was particularly fond of the title for lyrical piano pieces.

Georges Bizet's "Je crois entendre encore" from The Pearl Fishers (1863) is labelled a romance in the score.

Giuseppe Verdi's "Celeste Aida" from Aida (1871) is labelled romanza.

Franz Lehar's "Wie einen Rosenknospe" from "The Merry Widow" is labelled "Romance".

== Works with voice parts ==
- Lieder by Franz Schubert:
  - D 114, "Romanze" ['Ein Fräulein klagt’ im finstern Turm'] for voice and piano (1814; 2 versions)
  - D 144, "Romanze" ['In der Väter Hallen ruhte'] for voice and piano (1816, sketch)
  - D 222, "Lieb Minna" ['Schwüler Hauch weht mir herüber'] for voice and piano (1815, also appears as "Lieb Minna. Romanze")
  - D 907, "Romanze des Richard Löwenherz" ['Großer Taten tat der Ritter fern im heiligen Lande viel'] for voice and piano (1826?, two versions, 2nd version is Op. 86)
  - "Romanze", No. 3b of Schubert's Rosamunde
- Wilhelm Killmayer: Romanzen (1954)

== Romances sans paroles ==
So many composers in the French tradition wrote Romances sans paroles, "Romances without words", from the 1840s onwards that the radical poet Paul Verlaine in turn published a collection of his impressionistic poems as Romances sans paroles (1874).

== Russian romance ==
External video
- Top 25 Russian Romances on YouTube

During the 19th century Alexander Alyabyev (1787–1851), Alexander Varlamov (1801–48) and Alexander Gurilyov (1803–58) developed the French variety of the romance as a sentimental category of Russian art song. Black Eyes is perhaps the best known example. Among other notable examples of the Russian Romance are Shine, Shine, My Star and Along the Long Road.
