= Bieri =

Bieri or Biery is a surname. Notable people with these surnames include:

== Bieri ==
- James Bieri (1927–2025), American psychologist and biographer
- Lydia Bieri (born 1972), Swiss-American mathematician and physicist
- Maya Pedersen-Bieri (born 1972), Swiss skeleton racer
- Martin Bieri (born 1961), Swiss wheelchair curler, 2010 Winter Paralympian
- Peter Bieri (author) (1944–2023), Swiss author
- Peter Bieri (politician) (born 1952), Swiss politician
- Ramon Bieri (1929–2001), American actor

== Biery ==
- Edward A. Biery (1920–2012), American film editor
- James Biery, American organist, composer and conductor
- James Soloman Biery (1839–1904), American politician
