= Mujhme =

Song by Shreeraj Kurup
- Released: 11 March 2016 (India)
- Genre: Romance
- Length: 5:18
- Composer: Rajesh Murugeshan
- Lyricist: Shreeraj Kurup

Mujhme (Hindi:मुझमे; Urdu:مجھمے) is a Hindi cover of song Malare from the 2015 blockbuster Premam. The original song was composed by Rajesh murugeshan with Lyrics by Shabareesh Varma and vocals by Vijay Yesudas. Hindi lyrics is penned by Shreeraj Kurup and sung by Vibhas Purushu. It quickly became popular on social media upon release.

== Legacy ==
The song was featured in many leading newspapers, all praising the lyrics and vocals of the song. It has surpassed over 200k views on both Facebook and YouTube.
