= Skorzeny =

Skorzeny may refer to:

People

- Otto Skorzeny, (1908–1975), Austrian Waffen-SS officer
- Fritz Skorzeny, Austrian composer of classical music, see List of compositions for viola: S to Z

Fictional characters

- Janos Skorzeny, the fictional vampire in Kolchak: The Night Stalker
- Janos Skorzeny, the fictional werewolf in Werewolf
