= O sacrum convivium =

Latin prose text honoring the Blessed Sacrament

"O sacrum convivium" is a Latin prose text honoring the Blessed Sacrament. It is included as an antiphon to the Magnificat in the vespers of the liturgical office on the feast of Corpus Christi. The text of the office has been attributed to Saint Thomas Aquinas.

Its sentiments express the profound affinity of the Eucharistic celebration, described as a banquet, to the Paschal mystery : "O sacred banquet at which Christ is consumed, the memory of his Passion is recalled, our souls are filled with grace, and the pledge of future glory is given to us."

== Text ==
Original Latin (punctuation from Liber Usualis)

O sacrum convivium!
in quo Christus sumitur:
recolitur memoria passionis eius:
mens impletur gratia:
et futurae gloriae nobis pignus datur.
Alleluia.

Translation of original Latin

How holy this feast
in which Christ is our food;
his passion is recalled;
grace fills our hearts;
and we receive a pledge of the glory to come.
Alleluia.

== Indulgence ==
The 2004 Enchiridion Indulgentiarum grants a partial indulgence for saying this prayer.

== Various settings ==
O sacrum convivium exists in Gregorian and Ambrosian chant forms. Some of the many composers who have set the text are as follows:

- Gregor Aichinger
- Hendrik Andriessen
- Jacques Arcadelt
- Kim André Arnesen
- Jason Bahr
- Domenico Bartolucci
- Giuseppe Antonio Bernabei
- James Biery (With an alternate English text by Marilyn Biery)
- Douglas Brooks-Davies
- Javier Busto
- William Byrd
- Francisco José Carbonell (1985). His "O Sacrum Convivium" was awarded with the First Prize in the 2015 Chorus Austin Young Composers Competition.
- Marc-Antoine Charpentier, H.239 - 239 a, H.235, H.278 and H.240
- Giovanni Paolo Cima
- Giovanni Croce
- Don Michael Dice
- Eugene E. Englert
- Rolande Falcinelli
- Richard Farrant
- Johann Emanuel Faulhaber (1772-1835) compositore della "Reggia Città di Louny" (Bohemia)
- Andrea Gabrieli
- François Giroust
- Noël Goemanne
- Francisco Guerrero
- Matthew Harris
- Gabriel Jackson
- Frank La Rocca
- Kenneth Leighton
- Franz Liszt
- Dan Locklair
- Luca Marenzio
- Frank Martin
- Peter Mathews
- Olivier Messiaen's O sacrum convivium!
- Vytautas Miškinis
- Philip Moore
- Cristóbal de Morales
- Francisco J. Nunez
- Don Lorenzo Perosi
- Giovanni Pierluigi da Palestrina
- Giovanni Battista Pergolesi
- Roger T. Petrich
- Dominique Phinot
- Roberto Remondi
- Miguel Astor Salazar (1958). «O Sacrum Convivium» (2018) Obra premiada en el VI Concurso Internacional Amadeus de Composición Coral.
- Alwin Michael Schronen
- Fredrik Sixten O Sacrum Convivium
- Philip Stopford
- Steven Stucky
- Jan Pieterszoon Sweelinck
- Thomas Tallis
- Francisco Valls
- Jules Van Nuffel
- Ralph Vaughan Williams has a wordless chorus intone the chant melody in "Love Bade Me Welcome," the third of the Five Mystical Songs.
- Ludovico da Viadana
- Tomas Luis de Victoria
- Nicholas Wilton
