= Lawrence Power =

British violist (born 1977)

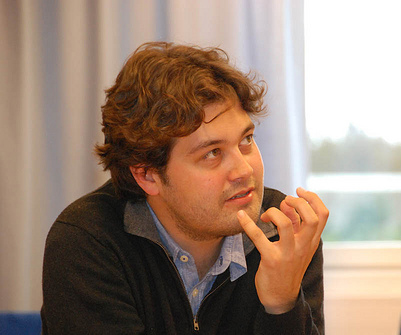
- Power in 2011
- Born: 1977 (age 47–48)
- Education: Guildhall School of Music and Drama; Juilliard School
- Occupations: Violist; Academic teacher
- Organizations: Nash Ensemble

Lawrence Power is a British violist, born 1977, noted both for solo performances and for chamber music with the Nash Ensemble and Leopold String Trio.

== Career ==
Power started out as a violist (rather than beginning studies on the violin and switching to viola) at his primary school aged eight. When 11, Power entered the Junior Department of the Guildhall School of Music and Drama in London studying with Mark Knight. Later Power spent a year at the Juilliard School with Karen Tuttle.

After a year in New York, Power returned to London and won first prize in the Primrose International Viola Competition in 1999. Following a third prize at the 2000 Maurice Vieux International Viola Competition in Paris, he made his first recording (Ligeti, Roslavets, Takemitsu and Prokofiev).

In 2001 Power was selected to become a BBC Radio 3 New Generation Artist until 2003.

Power is a visiting professor at the Royal College of Music in London and has given master classes at the Verbier Festival.

In 2003 Power was head-hunted to become the leader of the viola section of Berlin Philharmonic Orchestra, but despite playing with them in Mahler's 3rd Symphony at the Barbican under Haitink he did not audition for the position.

Since his London solo debut with The Philharmonia, he has performed in the UK and abroad, appearing as soloist with many orchestras such as the London Symphony, BBC Symphony, English Chamber, Scottish Chamber, Royal Liverpool Philharmonic, Bergen Philharmonic, Royal Stockholm Philharmonic, Verbier Festival Chamber, New Zealand Symphony, Lucerne Festival Strings and Symphonieorchester des Bayerischen Rundfunks.

At the Proms, he has played the Mozart Sinfonia concertante (with Maxim Vengerov) in 2006, the Walton Viola Concerto in 2007, Vaughan Williams's Flos Campi in 2008, and he took part in a chamber music Prom in 2009. James MacMillan dedicated his Viola Concerto to Power in 2013.

Power has a prominent career as a chamber musician, as violist in the Nash Ensemble and the Leopold String Trio. He has made guest appearances at international music festivals such as Edinburgh, Aldeburgh, Verbier, Vancouver, and Oslo. He was awarded the Cobbett Medal for services to chamber music in 2023.

Lawrence Power plays a 17-inch (43.3 cm) viola by Antonio Brensi of Bologna from c.1610.

== Commissions ==
In recent years Power has commissioned a series of major works for the viola. These include:

- Thomas Adès : Three Berceuses (2018)
- Gerald Barry : Viola Concerto (2019)
- Anders Hillborg : Viola Concerto (2021)
- Kurt Schwertsik : "Haydn Lived in Eisenstadt" for Viola and Piano (2021)
- Cassandra Miller : Viola Concerto (2022)
- Huw Watkins : Viola Concerto (2022/3?)

There are also the "Lockdown Commissions" - ten short pieces that were performed and videoed in venues vacated due to Coronovirus, starting in June 2020. The commissioned composers were: Martyn Brabbins, Garth Knox, Thomas Larcher, William Marsey, Cassandra Miller, Olli Mustonen, Esa-Pekka Salonen, Erkki-Sven Tüür, Huw Watkins and Héloïse Werner.

== Discography ==
Viola music

- Gerald Barry: Viola Concerto (2018–2019); Lawrence Power (viola), Britten Sinfonia, Thomas Adès (conductor); Signum Records SIGCD639 (2020)
- James MacMillan: Viola Concerto (2013); Lawrence Power (viola), Martyn Brabbins conducting the BBC Philharmonic; Hyperion Records CDA68317 (2020)
- Harold in Italy; Lawrence Power (viola), Bergen Philharmonic Orchestra, Andrew Manze (conductor); Hyperion Records CDA68193 (2018)

Hector Berlioz – Harold en Italie, Symphony in Four Parts with Viola Obbligato, Op. 16 (1834)
Carl Maria von Weber – Andante und Rondo ungarese (Andante and Hungarian Rondo) in C minor for viola and orchestra, Op. 35, J. 79 (1809)

- Fin de siècle: Music for viola and piano; Lawrence Power (viola), Simon Crawford-Phillips (piano); Hyperion Records CDA68165 (2016)

Henri Büsser – Appassionato, Op. 34 (1910)
Georges Hüe – Thème varié (1907)
Reynaldo Hahn – Soliloque et Forlane (1937)
Claude Debussy – Beau soir (1877–1878)
Ernest Chausson – Pièce, Op. 39 (1897)
Léon Honnoré – Morceau de Concert, Op. 23 (1890)
Louis Vierne – Deux Pièces: Le Soir and Légende, Op. 5 (1894–1895)
Lucien Durosoir – Vitrail (1934)
George Enescu – Concertstück (1906)
Maurice Ravel – Deux mélodies hébraïques No. 1: Kaddisch (1914)

- Arthur Benjamin: Violin Sonatina & Viola Sonata; Lawrence Power (viola), Simon Crawford-Phillips (piano); Hyperion Records CDA67969 (2014)

Elegy, Waltz and Toccata, Sonata in E minor for viola and piano (1942)
From San Domingo for viola and piano (1945); transcription by William Primrose
Jamaican Rumba for viola and piano (1937); transcription by William Primrose (1944)
Le Tombeau de Ravel, Valses-caprices for viola and piano (1949)
3 Pieces for violin and piano (1921, 1924)
Sonatina in B minor for violin and piano (1924)
A Tune and Variations for Little People for violin and piano (1937)

- York Bowen: The Complete Works for Viola and Piano; Lawrence Power (viola), Simon Crawford-Phillips (piano); with Philip Dukes, James Boyd, Scott Dickinson (violas); Hyperion Records CDA67651/2 (2008)

Allegro de Concert in D minor for viola and piano (1906)
Fantasia ("Fantasie Quartet") in E minor for 4 violas, Op.41 No.1 (1907)
Beethoven's "Moonlight" Sonata, Movement I for piano with viola obbligato; transcription by York Bowen; completed and edited by Lawrence Power
Melody for the C-String in F major for viola and piano, Op.51 No.2 (1918)
Melody on the G-String in G♭ major for viola and piano, Op.47 (1917)
Phantasy in F major for viola and piano, Op.54 (1918)
Rhapsody in G minor for viola and piano, Op.149 (1955)
Romance in A major for viola and piano (1908)
Romance in D♭ major for viola and piano (1900, 1904)
Viola Sonata No.1 in C minor for viola and piano, Op.18 (1905)
Viola Sonata No.2 in F major for viola and piano, Op.22 (1906)

- Bowen • Forsyth Viola Concertos; Lawrence Power (viola), Martyn Brabbins conducting the BBC Scottish Symphony Orchestra; Hyperion Records CDA67546 (2005)

York Bowen – Viola Concerto in C minor, Op.25 (1906–1907), world premiere recording
Cecil Forsyth – Viola Concerto in G minor (1903), world premiere recording

- Johannes Brahms: Viola Sonatas; Lawrence Power (viola), Simon Crawford-Phillips (piano), Tim Hugh (cello); Hyperion Records CDA67584 (2007); also released in 12-CD set Johannes Brahms: Complete Chamber Music; Hyperion Records CDS44331/42 (2008)

Sonata in F minor for viola and piano, Op.120 No.1 (1894)
Sonata in E♭ major for viola and piano, Op.120 No.2 (1894)
Trio in A minor for piano, viola and cello, Op.114 (1891)

- Benjamin Britten: Violin Concerto & Double Concerto; Lawrence Power (viola), Anthony Marwood (violin); Ilan Volkov conducting the BBC Scottish Symphony Orchestra; Hyperion Records CDA67801 (2012)

Double Concerto in B minor for violin, viola and orchestra (1932)
Lachrymae – Reflections on a Song by John Dowland for viola and string orchestra, Op. 48a (1950, orchestrated 1976)

- Paul Hindemith: The Complete Viola Music, Vol. 1 – Sonatas; Lawrence Power (viola), Simon Crawford-Phillips (piano); Hyperion Records CDA67721 (2008)

Sonata in F for viola and piano, Op.11 No.4 (1919)
Sonata for viola and piano, Op.25 No.4 (1922)
Sonata for viola and piano (1939)
Meditation from Nobilissima visione for viola and piano (1938)

- Paul Hindemith: The Complete Viola Music, Vol. 2 – Solo Sonatas; Lawrence Power (viola); Records CDA67769 (2010)

Sonata for solo viola, Op.11 No.5 (1919)
Sonata for solo viola, Op.25 No.1 (1922)
Sonata for solo viola, Op.31 No.4 (1923)
Sonata for solo viola (1937)

- Vincent d'Indy; Lawrence Power (viola), Thierry Fischer conducting the BBC National Orchestra of Wales; Hyperion Records CDA67690 (2009)

Choral varié for viola and orchestra, Op.55 (1903)
Lied for viola and orchestra, Op.19 (1884)

- Les Nouveaux Musiciens: Lawrence Power; Lawrence Power (viola), Simon Crawford-Phillips (piano); Harmonia Mundi HMN911756 (2001)

György Ligeti – Sonata for viola solo (1991–1994)
Sergei Prokofiev – Pieces from Romeo and Juliet for viola and piano, Op.64; transcriptions by Vadim Borisovsky

Introduction: The Montagues and Capulets
The Young Juliet
Dance of the Knights
Farewell before Parting and Death of Juliet
Mercutio

Nikolai Roslavets – Sonata No.1 for viola and piano (1926); completed by Alexander Raskatov
Tōru Takemitsu – A Bird Came Down the Walk for viola and piano, SJ 1092 (1994)

- Wolfgang Amadeus Mozart – Sinfonia Concertante for violin, viola and orchestra, K.364 (1779); Maxim Vengerov (violin), Lawrence Power (viola), UBS Verbier Festival Chamber Orchestra; EMI Classics (2007)
- Rózsa • Bartók Viola Concertos – Lawrence Power (viola), Andrew Litton (conductor), Bergen Philharmonic Orchestra; Hyperion Records CDA67687 (2010)

Miklós Rózsa – Viola Concerto, Op.37 (1982)
Tibor Serly – Rhapsody for viola and orchestra (1946–48)
Béla Bartók – Viola Concerto, Sz.120, BB128 (1945)

- Dmitri Shostakovich: Music for Viola and Piano; Lawrence Power (viola), Simon Crawford-Phillips (piano); Hyperion Records CDA67865 (2012)

Sonata for viola and piano, Op. 147 (1975)
5 Pieces from "The Gadfly" for viola and piano, Op. 97 (1955); transcriptions by Vadim Borisovsky
7 Preludes for viola and piano, Op. 34 (1932–1933); transcriptions by Yevgeny Strakhov

- Mark-Anthony Turnage – Eulogy for viola and orchestra (2003); Lawrence Power (viola), Nash Ensemble; ONYX 4005 (2005)
- Walton • Rubbra Viola Concertos; Lawrence Power (viola), Ilan Volkov conducting the BBC Scottish Symphony Orchestra; Hyperion Records CDA67587 (2007)

William Walton – Viola Concerto in A minor (original version, 1928–1929)
Edmund Rubbra – Meditations on a Byzantine Hymn for viola solo, Op.117 (1962)
Edmund Rubbra – Viola Concerto in A minor, Op.75 (1952)

- Ralph Vaughan Williams: The Early Chamber Music – Romance for viola and piano (c.1914); Lawrence Power (viola), Nash Ensemble; Hyperion Records CDA67381/2 (2002)
- Vaughan Williams • McEwen: Flos Campi, Viola Concerto; Lawrence Power (viola), Martyn Brabbins conducting the BBC National Orchestra and Chorus of Wales; Hyperion Records CDA67839 (2011)

Ralph Vaughan Williams – Suite for viola and small orchestra (1933–1934)
Ralph Vaughan Williams – Flos Campi, Suite for viola, wordless chorus and small orchestra (1925)
John Blackwood McEwen – Concerto for viola and orchestra (1901)

Chamber music

- Sergei Ivanovich Taneyev: String Trios; Leopold String Trio; Hyperion Records CDA67573 (2008)

String Trio in E♭ major, Op.31
String Trio in B minor
String Trio in D major

- William Walton: Chamber Music – Piano Quartet (1918–1921, revised 1975); Nash Ensemble; Hyperion Records CDA67340 (2002)
