= Rhosymedre =

Village in Wrexham County Borough, Wales

Coordinates: 52.977°N 3.069°W

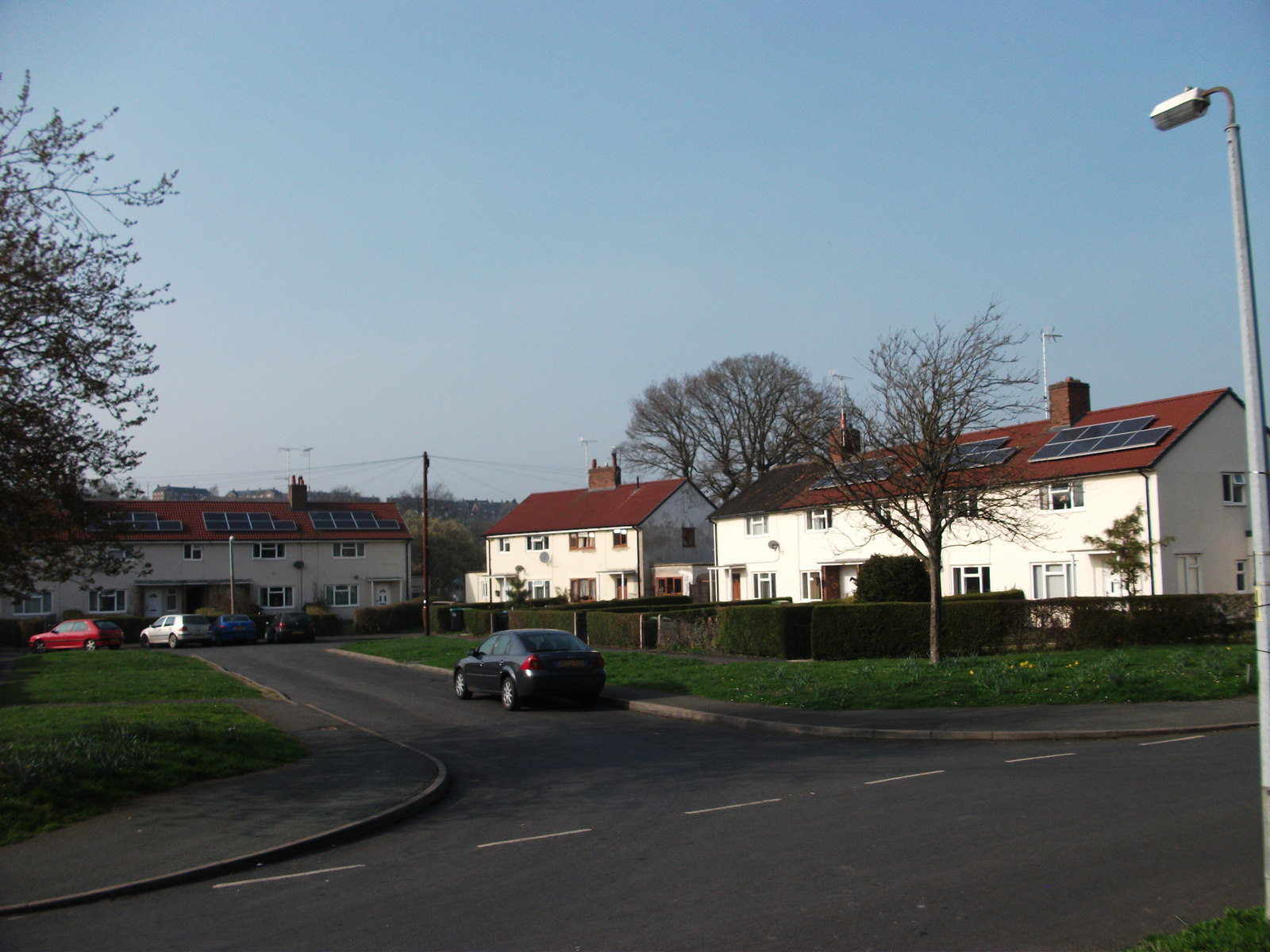
- Housing in Rhosymedre

- Location within Wrexham
- OS grid reference: SJ282427
- Community: Cefn
- Principal area: Wrexham
- Country: Wales
- Sovereign state: United Kingdom
- Post town: WREXHAM
- Postcode district: LL14
- Dialling code: 01978
- Police: North Wales
- Fire: North Wales
- Ambulance: Welsh
- UK Parliament: Clwyd South
- Senedd Cymru – Welsh Parliament: Clwyd South

Rhosymedre (Welsh pronunciation) is a village within the community of Cefn, in Wrexham County Borough, Wales.

The Anglican church, which was consecrated in 1837, is dedicated to St John the Evangelist, and is part of the Diocese of St Asaph. Former vicars include John David Edwards (vicar from 1843 to 1885), whose most famous hymn tune composition is Rhosymedre, upon which Ralph Vaughan Williams later based an organ prelude.

The quarry behind Rock Road was originally the source of stones for building the Llangollen Canal, and also the houses of the local mining community.

Rhosymedre Halt railway station served the village from 1906 to 1959.

== Sport ==
Rhosymedre is the location of the Cefn Mawr district's local football club, Cefn Druids A.F.C. who have been based at 'the Rock' on Rock Road, Rhosymedre since 2010. They currently play in the Welsh Premier League.
