= O sacrum convivium! =

Choral composition by Olivier Messiaen

- by Olivier Messiaen
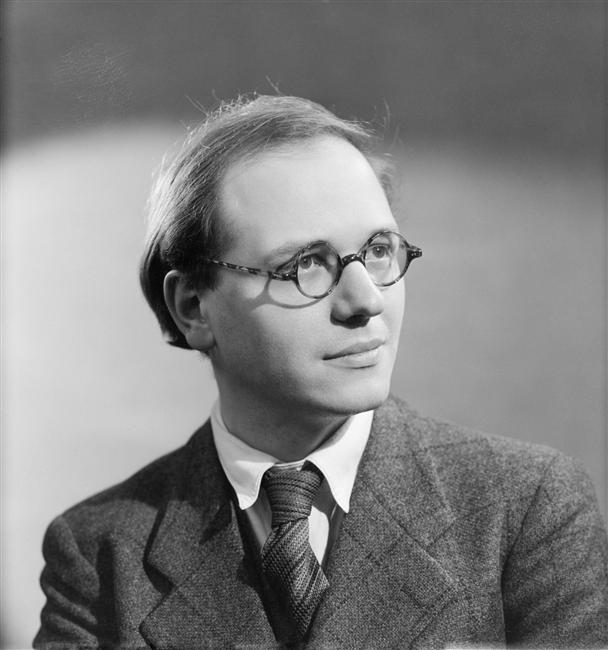
- Messiaen in 1937
- Text: O sacrum convivium
- Language: Latin
- Composed: 1937:
- Published: June 1937: Paris
- Scoring: Four-part mixed chorus Four solo voices (with optional organ accompaniment)

O sacrum convivium! (Latin: O sacred banquet) is a short offertory motet for four-part mixed chorus (with organ accompaniment ad libitum) by French composer Olivier Messiaen, setting "O sacrum convivium," a text attributed to Thomas Aquinas. It was composed and published in 1937.

== Composition ==
The composition of the motet on a Latin text for the offertory of the mass was commissioned by a clergyman, Abbé Brun, and Messiaen presumably completed it within the first months of 1937, when he was 29. He was a faithful Catholic for life, and composed many works related to religious topics, but never wrote any other sacred compositions meant to be performed in Catholic liturgy.

I understand completely your desire to renew the liturgy and your horror of recent hymns—which I share! Unfortunately, I believe my music to be much too complex to be of use to you: it can only be played on the piano, on the organ, and above all by an orchestra, and is intended only for an initiated élite. I think it would be unsingable by a congregation and also by young children.

— Olivier Messiaen, Letter to Abbé Pézeril, at the parish of Saint-Jacques-du-Haut Pas, May 11, 1964

Even though it is very likely that this piece was performed the year of its completion (probably with organ accompaniment), the first known performance was early the next year, in a concert by Les Amis de l'Orgue, at Sainte-Trinité, Paris, on 17 February 1938, where Messiaen and other composers performed their own compositions. The score was published in June 1937, soon after its completion, by Éditions Durand. The piece ultimately became popular, but the initial 1000-copy printing took over 16 years to sell. It was reprinted 18 times between 1954 and 1991, with a total of over 138,000 copies in print.

== Structure ==
This 35-bar piece is scored for four-part mixed chorus. Messiaen said that four unspecified solo voices could also be a suitable scoring for the piece, along with an optional accompaniment of an organ (ad libitum), which is unusually flexible for him. Since the date of its first known performance (Messiaen performed the piece together with either Mme Bourdette-Vial or Lucile Darlay), Messiaen also accepted a different scoring variation: soprano and organ. But in 1986, he listed the composition as for "mixed chorus a cappella", and this is the way it is most performed today. The tempo indication at the beginning of the piece is Lent et expressif (Slow and expressive) and performers are asked to count eighth notes, as no time signature is provided (as became usual in future Messiaen compositions). The number of eighth notes per bar varies greatly.

The text is taken from "O sacrum convivium", a Latin text celebrating the Blessed Sacrament. This was the first time Messiaen used a Latin text, instead of a text in French. A mainly tonal work, it is in F♯ major, Messiaen's favorite key. As in Le banquet céleste, F♯ major expresses the mystical experience of "superhuman love". Some scholars dispute the tonal aspect of the work and offer different explanations based on a system Messiaen later came to call "modes of limited transposition". Though one of the composer's best-known works, he said it was not representative of his style.
