= Javier Busto =

Composer, choirmaster (b1949)

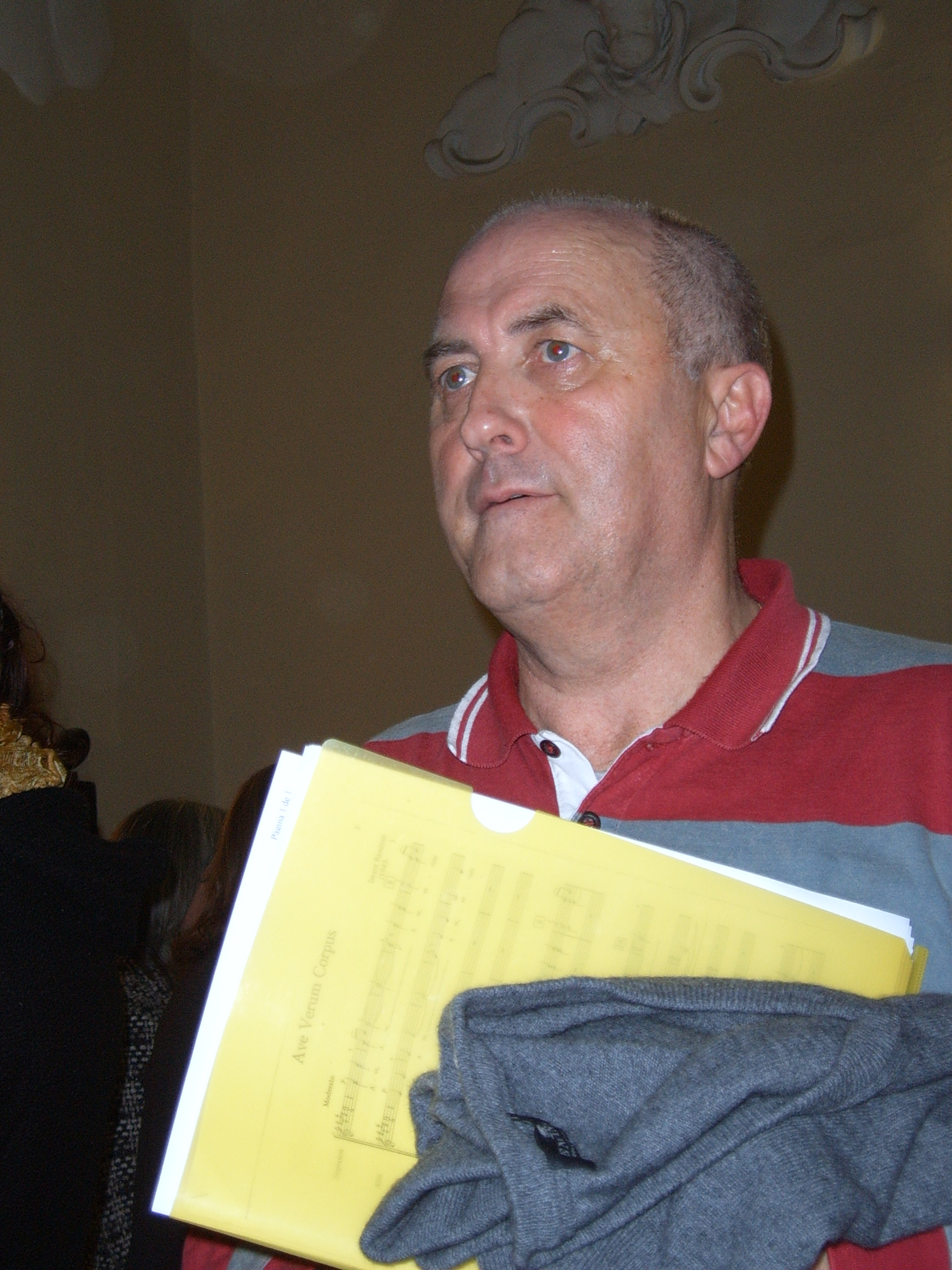
Javier Busto in November, 2006

Javier Busto Sagrado (born 13 November 1949 in Hondarribia, Basque Country, Spain) is a Spanish choral music composer and conductor.

== Career ==
Originally trained as a medical doctor, Busto taught himself music, but was initiated into choir direction by Erwin List. In 1995, he founded Kanta Cantemus Korua, a choir composed of women in their mid to late teens. In 1978 he founded the Eskifaia Choir in Hondarribia.

Busto has presented his compositions at the Fourth World Symposium on Choral Music in Sydney, Australia in 1996, and was guest conductor of the Tokyo Cantat in 2000. His choirs have won first place awards in France, Italy, Austria, and Germany. Busto has served on the jury of composition and choral competitions in Spain, France, Italy and Japan.

== Works ==
Busto's compositions are published in Sweden, Germany, Spain and the United States.

=== SATB ===
- Ametsetan
- Agnus Dei
- Ave Maria
- Ave maris stella
- Ave verum corpus
- Laudate pueri
- O sacrum convivium
- O magnum mysterium
- Pater Noster
- The Lord Is My Shepherd
- Zutaz (divisi, a cappella)
- Missa pro defunctis (divisi, clarinete, soprano and bariton solos a cappella)

=== SSAA ===
- Magnificat
- Popule Meus
- Laudate Dominum
- Salve Regina
- Bustapi
- Ave Maria Gratia Plena
- Hodie Christus Natus Est

=== TTBB ===
- Cuatro cantos penitenciales
