= Stricken Peninsula =

1945 British propaganda film

- Directed by: Paul Fletcher
- Narrated by: William Holt
- Music by: Muir Mathieson
- Production company: Army Film Unit
- Release date: 1945
- Running time: 13 minutes
- Country: United Kingdom
- Language: English

Stricken Peninsula is a 1945 British short propaganda film directed by Paul Fletcher and narrated by William Holt. It was made by the Army Film Unit and the British Ministry of Information for the Department of Psychological Warfare to highlight the British Army's reconstruction work in southern Italy in the immediate aftermath of World War II.

== Cast ==
- William Holt as narrator

== Score ==
A score for the film was composed by the British composer Ralph Vaughan Williams, but is now lost. A reconstructed score arranged by Philip Lane and performed by the BBC Symphony Orchestra was broadcast on BBC Radio 3 in March 2016.

The Documentary News Letter (DNL) reserved their criticism for Vaughan Williams's score feeling that it was "execrable" and that "One is conscious only of obtrusive and disagreeable noise intruding between the audience and a moving story". This was the last of the British propaganda films that Vaughan Williams scored. Jeffrey Richards in his 1997 book Films and National British Identity wrote that Vaughan Williams's score could "stand on its own" as "an atmospheric and economical but musically sophisticated and multi-layered evocation of the various facets of post-war reconstruction".

== Reception ==
A contemporaneous review of the film by the DNL praised it as "salutary and excellent. The realities of the war's aftermath presented with considerable artistry".

In The Monthly Film Bulletin the Background Films Committee wrote: "This joint Army Film Unit and M.O.I. film gives a vivid picture of war's aftermath. Though it is in some ways out of date now, it will unhappily be many years before normal conditions return, and it is well that we should be reminded of Italy's sufferings and difficulties. The music by Vaughan Williams is often discordant; but presumably it is deliberately so, in tune with the grim seenes which it accompanies. It would not be a very useful film for Adult Groups, Youth Clubs or Schools, save in connection with a discussion on war and its disastrous effects."
