= John Edwards (hymnist) =

Welsh cleric and composer

John David Edwards (19 December 1805 – 24 November 1885) was a Welsh cleric and hymn-tune composer.

== Life ==
Edwards was born in Penderlwyngoch, Gwnnws, in Cardiganshire in Wales. After education at Ystrad Meurig school, he attended Jesus College, Oxford, matriculating in 1825 and obtaining his Bachelor of Arts degree in 1830. He was ordained deacon in 1832 and priest in 1833, serving as curate at Llansanffraid Glyndyfrdwy in Denbighshire and also in Aberdyfi in Merionethshire. In 1843, he was presented to the parish of Rhosymedre, Denbighshire by Sir Watkin Williams-Wynn, and he remained in this post until his death. He took music lessons from Dafydd Siencyn Morgan and was regarded as a good musician. He composed various hymns tunes, publishing a collection in 1836 under the title "Original Sacred Music", which was the first book of hymn-tunes for Anglican churches in Wales. A further collection was published in 1843. He wrote the hymn tune Rhosymedre, later used by Ralph Vaughan Williams as the basis for one of his organ preludes on Welsh hymn tunes. He died at his nephew's house in Llanddoged on 24 November 1885, and was buried at Tal-y-llyn.
