= Rhosymedre (hymn tune) =

Hymn tune written by John David Edwards

Rhosymedre is a hymn tune written by the 19th-century Welsh Anglican priest John David Edwards. Edwards named the tune after the village of Rhosymedre in the County Borough of Wrexham, Wales, where he was the vicar from 1843 until his death in 1885. Contrary to popular belief, Rhosymedre does not mean ‘lovely’ in Welsh; the ‘rhos’ aspect means meadow or heath, and ‘ymedre’ is unknown, but speculated to have meant ‘township’. The belief stems from the song’s subtitle as ‘Lovely’, intended to describe the song’s character, being misinterpreted as a translation. The hymn tune is seven lines long, with a meter of 6.6.6.6.8.8.8. It appears in a number of hymnals and is sung to a variety of texts.

The tune was used by Ralph Vaughan Williams as the basis of the second movement of his organ composition Three Preludes Founded on Welsh Hymn Tunes. Although best known in this original version for solo organ, it is also well known as an orchestral arrangement by Arnold Foster published in 1938. The prelude has been arranged for other instruments or combinations of instruments, including for concert band (by Walter Beeler), solo piano, piano duet, clarinet choir and four recorders.

The "Prelude on the hymn tune 'Rhosymedre'" by Ralph Vaughan Williams was played at the funeral of Diana, Princess of Wales, at the request of her sister, Lady Sarah McCorquodale. It was also played at the weddings of her two sons − in April 2011 at Prince William's wedding and in May 2018 at Prince Harry's wedding − and in 2023 at the coronation of Charles III and Camilla.

In 2008, to mark the 50th anniversary of the death of Vaughan Williams, Richard Morrison (chief music critic of The Times) arranged the piece for string quartet and solo tenor. The first performance took place in May 2008, with James Gilchrist singing the words of the hymn.

== See also ==
- List of compositions by Ralph Vaughan Williams
