= Somerset Carol =

Folk song

Come all you worthy gentlemen, sometimes referred to as the Somerset Carol, is an English folk carol of unknown authorship. It was collected from a Mr. Rapsey, of Bridgwater during the English Folk-song revival at the beginning of the 20th century by Cecil Sharp. It was first published in 1905 in Sharp and Marson's Folk songs from Somerset. According to Sharp, it is a variant of the carol God Rest You Merry, Gentlemen.

The singer told Cecil Sharp that the carol had been taught to him by his mother and that, in company with other children, he used to sing it in the streets of Bridgwater at Christmas time, thus fitting it in with the Wassail tradition. To Sharp's knowledge, the carol had not been recorded or printed until it was noted at the turn of the 20th century. The carol was later used by Sharp's friend and fellow collector, Ralph Vaughan Williams, in his 1912 Fantasia on Christmas Carols.

== See also ==
- List of Christmas carols
