= String Quartet No. 1 (Grieg) =

Composition by Edvard Grieg

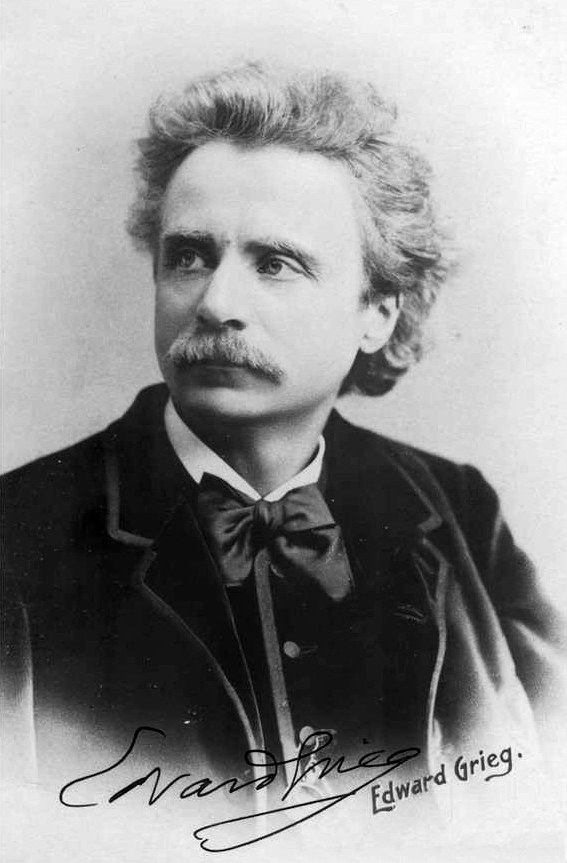
Portrait of Edvard Grieg from 1888

Edvard Grieg's String Quartet No. 1 in G minor, Op. 27, is the second of three string quartets written by the composer. The first, in D minor, was an early work, now lost, written in the early 1860s at the request of his teacher, Carl Reinecke. The third quartet, in F major, remained incomplete at the composer's death.

== Background ==
Grieg wrote the quartet in 1877–78, while living at a farm in Hardanger. He wrote to a friend "I have recently finished a string quartet which I still haven't heard. It is in G minor and is not intended to bring trivialities to market. It strives towards breadth, soaring flight and above all resonance for the instruments for which it is written."

The first performance of the quartet took place in Cologne in October 1878, by a quartet led by the work's dedicatee, violinist Robert Heckmann.

Publication of the quartet was delayed when the composer's preferred publisher, C.F. Peters, initially rejected the quartet because they believed the double stopping in some movements would require the work to be rewritten as a piano quartet or quintet. Grieg had to find another publisher, E.W. Fritzsch, and only after the success of that release did C.F. Peters publish their own edition.

== Structure ==
The work lasts around 35 minutes and has four movements.

1. Un poco andante – Allegro molto ed agitato
2. Romanze: Andantino
3. Intermezzo: Allegro molto marcato – Più vivo e scherzando
4. Finale: Lento – Presto al saltarello

== Influence ==
English musicologist Gerald Abraham, writing in 1948, suggested that Claude Debussy's String Quartet, also in G minor, was either consciously or subconsciously modelled on Grieg's quartet. Debussy often disparaged Grieg's abilities as a composer and a pianist.
