= Three Romances for Violin and Piano =

Violin and piano music composition

- by Clara Schumann
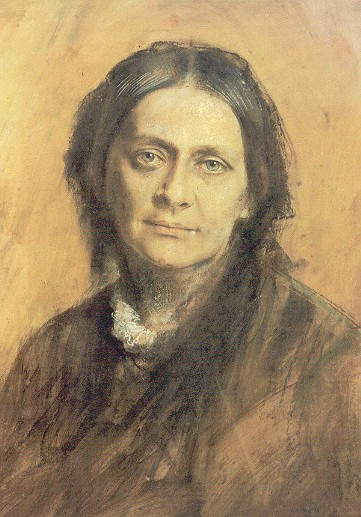
- Schumann, in 1878, in a painting by Franz von Lenbach
- Opus: 22
- Composed: 1853
- Dedication: Joseph Joachim
- Published: 1855 (ed. Breitkopf & Härtel)
- Movements: 3

The Three Romances for Violin and Piano, Op. 22, by Clara Schumann, were written in 1853 and first published in 1855.

== Background ==
Having moved to Düsseldorf in 1853, Clara Schumann produced several works, including the three romances. The romances were dedicated to violinist Joseph Joachim, and Schumann and Joachim went on tour with them. This included playing them before King George V of Hanover, who "declared them a 'marvellous, heavenly pleasure.'" A critic for Neue Berliner Musikzeitung praised them, declaring: "All three pieces display an individual character conceived in a truly sincere manner and written in a delicate and fragrant hand." Stephen Pettitt for The Times, wrote: "Lush and poignant, they make one regret that Clara's career as a composer became subordinate to her husband's."

== Structure ==
The romances, scored for violin and piano, are written in three movements:

1. Andante molto
2. Allegretto
3. Leidenschaftlich schnell

The first romance has Romani-inspired pathos amidst lyrical melodies. In the final section, Schumann references the main theme from her husband Robert Schumann's first violin sonata. The second romance is more syncopated, with many embellishments. It is sometimes considered as representative of all three, with energetic leaps and arpeggios, followed by a second theme and then a return to the first theme. The last movement is similar in structure to the first and approximately the same length in time as the first two, featuring long idiomatic melodies with intricate piano accompaniment. An average performance is about ten minutes in duration.
