= Romance, Op. 37 (Saint-Saëns) =

Romance for flute and piano by Gabriel Fauré

Romance
- by Camille Saint-Saëns
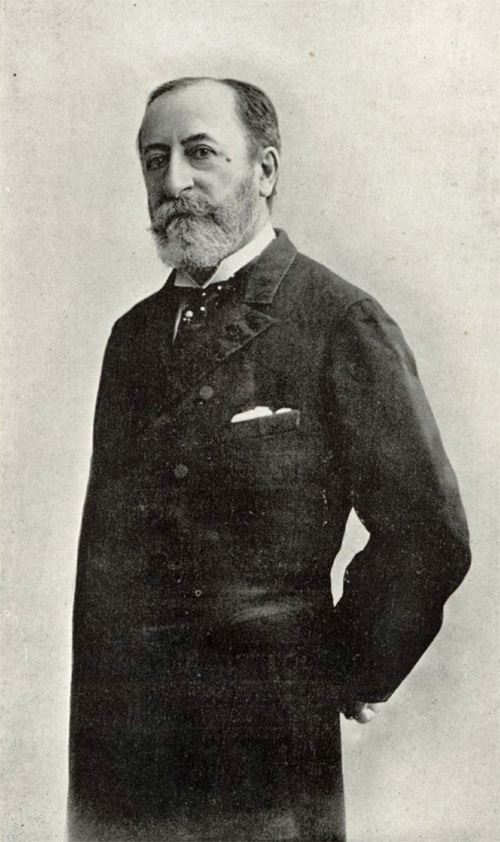
- Saint-Saëns circa 1880
- Key: D♭ major
- Opus: 37
- Composed: March 1871
- Dedication: Amédée de Vroye
- Duration: approximately 6 minutes
- Scoring: Flute; Piano or orchestra

Premiere
- Date: Mid-1871
- Location: Baden-Baden, Germany
- Performers: Amédée de Vroye and Camille Saint-Saëns

The Romance in D♭ major, Op. 37, is a composition by Camille Saint-Saëns for flute, accompanied by piano or orchestra, written in March 1871.

== History ==
The piece was composed shortly after the Franco-Prussian War. After the Armistice of Versailles was signed on 28 January 1871, the Paris Commune assumed power in Paris on 18 March. Fearing for his safety, Saint-Saëns fled to exile in London. Under these extreme conditions, he wrote the Romance, an enchanting piece that seems to be musically undisturbed by the circumstances of composition.

The piece was dedicated to Amédée de Vroye, a then well-known flautist. Because of political upheaval in France, the work was premiered by de Vroye and Saint-Saëns in mid-1871 in Baden-Baden, Germany. The Paris premiere was given by Paul Taffanel and Saint-Saëns at a Société nationale de musique concert at the Salle Pleyel on 6 April 1872. Saint-Saëns was a close friend of Taffanel, even becoming godfather to his daughter. Taffanel would become the Romance's real champion, performing it numerous times over the years.

== Music ==
External audio
- Romance, Op. 37
- For flute and piano, performed by Davide Formisano and Phillip Moll
- For flute and orchestra, performed by William Bennett and the English Chamber Orchestra under Steuart Bedford

Saint-Saëns composed six chamber music works titled Romance – the instrumental romance in three-part song form had gained significance from the 1860s onwards as the transcription of the extremely popular vocal romance.

The work is scored for flute and piano, with a version for flute and an orchestra consisting of 2 oboes, 2 clarinets in A, 2 bassoons, 4 horns (2 natural, 2 chromatic), 2 trumpets in D, timpani, and strings. The orchestral version was presumably planned from the outset. The work was also arranged for clarinet and piano by Alfred Piguet in 1907.

The Romance is a short piece at around six minutes. Edward Blakeman writes: "The Romance is a slight piece, but bewitchingly atmospheric. It spins an expressive line with the direct, unsentimental appeal of a lyrical mélodie." Today it is one of the more popular minor works by the composer and has established itself as part of the flute's core repertoire.
