= 12 Études for Viola =

Études written by Franz Anton Hoffmeister

The cover page for the first book of the collection

The 12 Études for Viola (German: 12 Etüden für Viola) by Franz Anton Hoffmeister are a set of pedagogically focused études composed for viola around 1800. They are regularly used in conservatory curricula and examinations. They were originally published by Bureau de Musique, a music publishing company co-founded by Hoffmeister.

Each study in the set has a distinct character and tempo indication:

1. Allegro
2. Menuettino
3. Allegretto
4. Allegro
5. Tema con variazioni
6. Andante
7. Vivace
8. Allegro
9. Cantabile
10. Allegro
11. Allegro moderato
12. Andante

The fourth etude shares thematic material with the first movement of Hoffmeister's Viola Concerto in D Major.

In 2004, British violist Ashan Pillai recorded all of Hoffmeister's viola-focused works, including both of his concertos and the full collection of études. An additional recording of the études was made by Italian violist Marco Misciagna in 2025.

== See also ==
- Viola repertoire
