= The truth sent from above =

Song

"The truth sent from above" is an English folk carol of unknown authorship usually performed at Christmas. Collected in the early part of the 20th century by English folk song collectors in Shropshire and Herefordshire, a number of variations on the tune exist, but the text remains broadly similar. The first line of the carol is "This is the truth sent from above".

Cecil Sharp collected an eight stanza version of the carol from a Mr. Seth Vandrell and Mr. Samuel Bradley of Donnington Wood in Shropshire, although Sharp notes that a longer version existed in a locally printed carol book.

Ralph Vaughan Williams obtained a different, Dorian mode version of the carol at King's Pyon, Herefordshire in July 1909 with help from Ella Mary Leather, the Herefordshire folklorist who had first collected it from the local oral tradition. This version, which contains only four stanzas, is therefore sometimes referred to as the Herefordshire Carol. Vaughan Williams first published the melody in the Folk-Song Society Journal in 1909 (where it is credited as being sung by a Mr W. Jenkins of King's Pyon).

Vaughan Williams later used five stanzas of the carol to open his Fantasia on Christmas Carols of 1912. Gerald Finzi, with permission from Vaughan Williams and Mrs Leather, also used the melody as the basis of his 1925 choral work The Brightness of This Day, substituting the text for a poem by Henry Vaughan

== See also ==
- List of Christmas carols
