= William Holt (writer) =

English writer and painter

William Holt (1897–1977) was born in Todmorden, West Yorkshire, the eldest son of a coal merchant. At the age of 13, whilst working in a cotton weaving shed, he taught himself several languages. Holt travelled extensively and had numerous jobs, including deck hand, stunt man, language teacher, newspaper correspondent (during the Spanish Civil War) and BBC broadcaster.

In 1920 he married Florence Silman and they eventually had four children. He became active in local political struggles in the late 1920s, becoming the only Communist to be elected to the Town Council. His protests against the Means Test led him to spend nine months in Wakefield Prison. Billy Holt also pioneered a motorised library service and developed a 'model' farm. At the age of 66 he made a trip across Europe on Trigger, an aging ex-rag-and-bone horse he had rescued. A Yorkshire TV documentary of his life was made in 1969, The All or Nothing Man.

As an artist Holt worked in a bold, dramatic style. His huge visionary paintings Christ Overcoming Space and Eternity Diadem, and Consider the Lilies (depicting hymn-singing weavers) attempt to show the triumph of man's spirit over mass production. But it is as a writer that he is most widely known.

During his life he received praise from Phyllis Bentley, J. B. Priestley, H. G. Wells, Glyn Hughes, Mike Harding, Ted Hughes and others.

== Published works ==
=== Autobiography ===
- Under a Japanese Parasol (F. King & Sons, 1933)
- I Was a Prisoner (Holt Publication [self-published], 1934)
- I Haven't Unpacked (George G. Harrap and Co., 1939; Michael Joseph, 1966)
- I Still Haven't Unpacked (1953)
- Trigger in Europe (Michael Joseph, 1966)

=== Novels ===
- Backwaters (Nicholson & Watson, 1934)
- The Price of Adventure (Nicholson & Watson, 1934)
- The Weaver's Knot (Werner Laurie, 1956; S.R. Publishers, 1971)
- The Wizard of Whirlaw (Holt Publication [self-published], 1959)
