= Four Hymns (Vaughan Williams) =

Ralph Vaughan Williams in 1913

Four Hymns, set to music for tenor voice with the accompaniment of pianoforte and viola obbligato, is a liturgical song cycle composed by Ralph Vaughan Williams.

== Composition ==
Following the composition of Five Mystical Songs in 1911, Vaughan Williams began to compose a smaller scale piece, which was completed in 1914. However, World War I delayed the presentation of the song cycle until 1920. In setting the four hymns to music, Vaughan Williams chose poems by Jeremy Taylor, Isaac Watts, Richard Crashaw, and Robert Bridges (a translation from the Greek).

The cycle is sometimes called Four Hymns for Tenor and Strings and performed in an orchestrated version with a string orchestra replacing the piano part. This version remains unpublished, but a manuscript in the composer's hand shows that he had completed an arrangement for string quartet, extracting Violin I, Violin II, and Cello parts from the original piano part.

== Hymns ==
The hymns are

1. "Lord, Come Away!" – Penned by Jeremy Taylor, it is notable for shifts in dynamics relative to the poetic content.
2. "Who is this fair one?" – Written by Isaac Watts, it features notable interplay between the solo tenor and solo viola, the two instruments communicating.
3. "Come Love, Come Lord" – Written by Richard Crashaw, it is among the shortest in the cycle and perhaps the most mysterious.
4. "Evening Hymn" – Translated from the Greek by Robert Bridges, it is a contrapuntal composition, and features two themes, the viola and tenor melody with the bell-like basso ostinato accompaniment.
