= Arthur Foxton Ferguson =

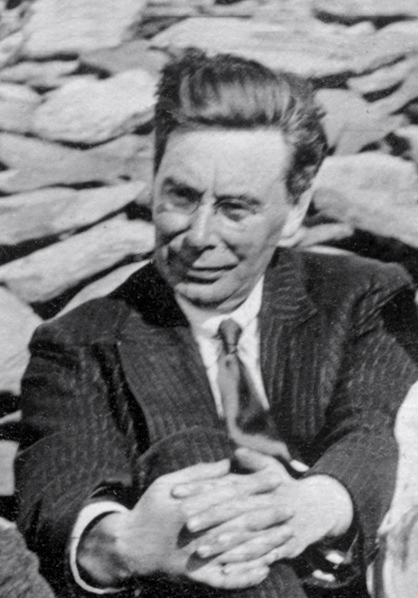
- Arthur Foxton Ferguson, baritone

Background information
- Born: 3 January 1866; Leeds, Yorkshire, Great Britain
- Died: 2 November 1920 (aged 54); Exmouth, Devonshire, Great Britain
- Genres: classical and folk
- Instrument: baritone
- Years active: 1885–1920
- Formerly of: The Folk-Song Quartet

Arthur Foxton Ferguson (3 January 1866 – 2 November 1920) an early-20th-century English baritone, lecturer, and German translator who founded The Folk-Song Quartet.

== Life and education ==
Arthur Foxton Ferguson was born 3 January 1866 at 25 Albion Street, Leeds, Yorkshire, to Emma and William Ferguson, a bank manager. He had six siblings including William Harold Ferguson (1874–1950).

As a child, he began at Coatham and progressed to Leeds Grammar School. He then went on in 1880 to Sedbergh School whose register reports that as librarian he, "re-catalogued the library with E. L. Crawhall" (another student). Foxton Ferguson continued on to New College, Oxford in 1885 and proceeded to get an Academic Clerkship at Magdalen College, Oxford in 1887 receiving his B.A. in 1890. This is confirmed by an entry on 14 February 1887 when then Magdalen President Herbert Warren reported in his notebook that, "Arthur Foxton Ferguson, a Commoner of New College," was elected to an Academical Clerkship at Magdalen College to "sing bass." The baritone had been one of nine students competing for the post. It was very unusual to switch colleges in the day and was only permitted in special situations like his.

On 26 October 1897 he married Susanne Alexandrine Delphine Engel, the daughter of a merchant Carl Albert Engel in the Parish Church, Pinner, Middlesex. A German of Bohemian extraction from Hamburg, she was a spinster and pianist who had studied at the Hamburg Conservatory but gave up her career as a concert pianist and moved to Scarborough to live with her aunt Ida Holt. It was there she met Foxton Ferguson.

== Vocal training and repertoire ==
Foxton Ferguson's vocal training is not well documented prior to his study in Germany but, most likely, his voice was honed in school music programs and choirs. As an Academic Clerk at Magdalen his duties included services with the esteemed organist John Varley Roberts. Foxton Ferguson's talent for solo singing became apparent in his college years at which time he appeared with the "Magdalen Vagabonds".

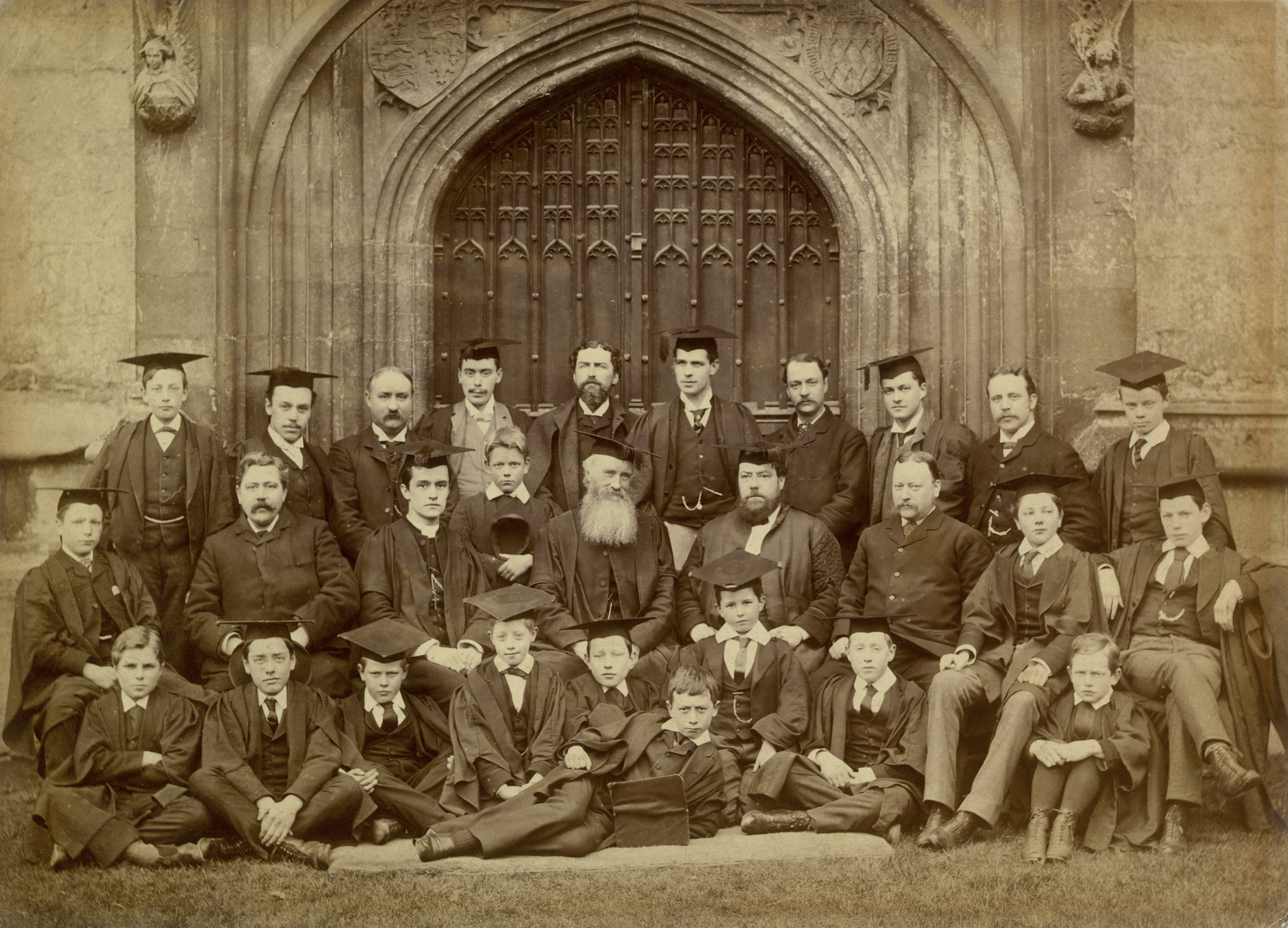
Arthur Foxton Ferguson – Academic Clerkship Magdalen College Oxford c. 1898 (also pictured: John Varley Roberts, legendary organist of Magdalen and Henry Bramley, Dean of Divinity)(Foxton Ferguson is fourth from the left in the back row and Roberts is fourth from the right in the middle row with Bramley to his left)

Ferguson's post-university musical studies took him to London and then Leipzig, though he was not enrolled at the Königliches Konservatorium der Musik zu Leipzig. Later he studied with the famous German baritone Julius Stockhausen who had founded his own school of singing in 1880. Stockhausen's diverse repertoire included opera, oratorio and, most of all, German Lieder. Foxton Ferguson's own repertoire was of a similar breadth and scope.

While he sang bass in ensembles he was called a baritone when singing as a soloist. His concert repertoire included an abundance of Lieder by Schubert and Schumann as well as folk song arrangements and original compositions by contemporary English composers. In opera Foxton Ferguson performed in such diverse repertoire as Mozart's Le nozze di Figaro and Wagner's Die Meistersinger von Nürnberg though opera didn't play as large a role in his career as concerts did.

== Career ==
Ferguson is most known for his English translations of German texts including Ottfried's Schubert Fantasies (1914); three 1903 duets based on German folk songs by Ralph Vaughan Williams, "Adieu", "Think of Me", and "Cousin Michael"; and Charles Macpherson's "The Shepherds' Cradle Song" (1912) based on "Der Hirten Wiegenlied" of Karl Neuner (1814).

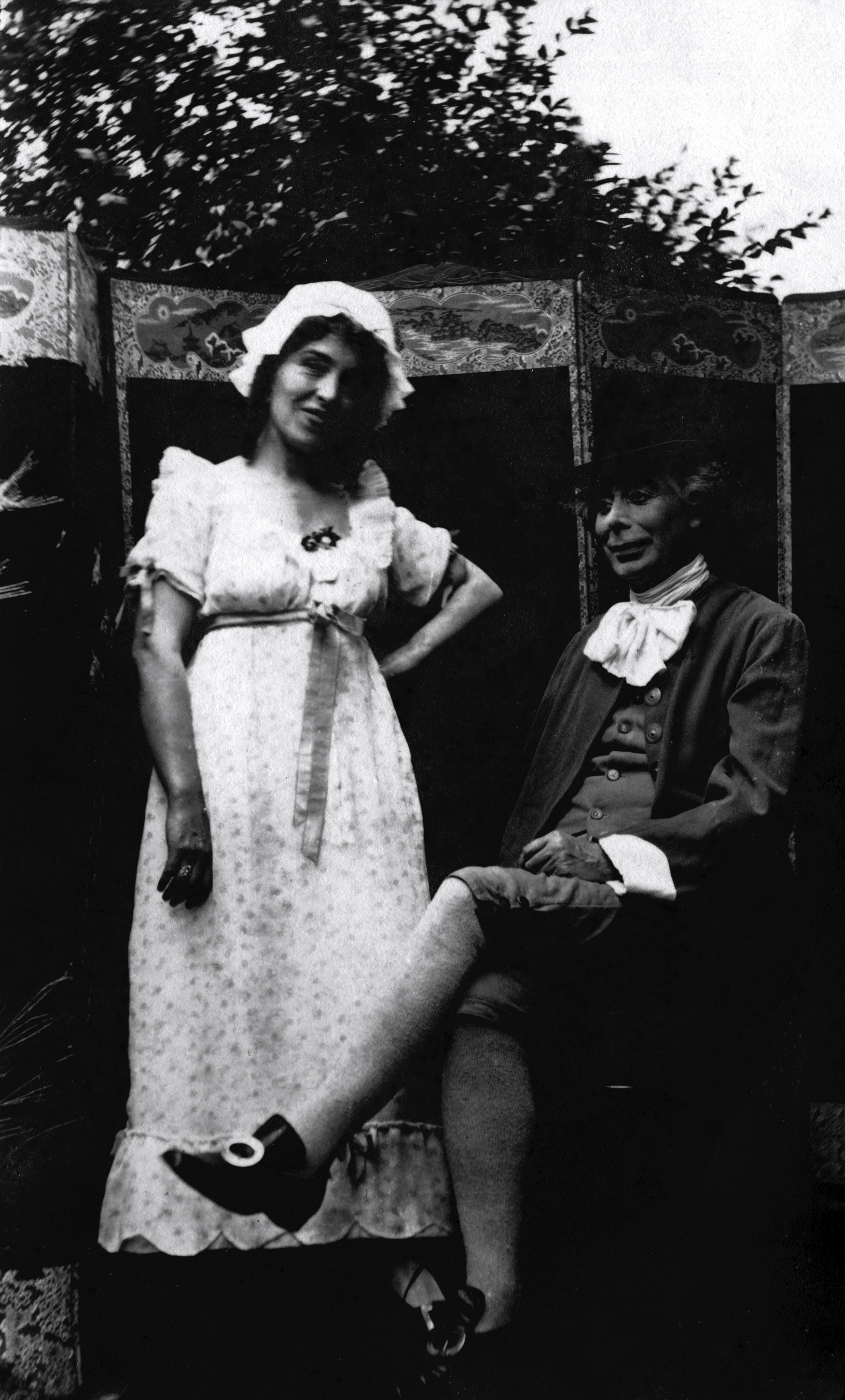
Arthur Foxton Ferguson in costume with unknown woman c. 1910

Ferguson collaborated regularly with Lucy Broadwood, Ernest Walker, Ralph Vaughan Williams, and Sir Henry Walford Davies. Working with Broadwood and the English Folk Dance and Song Society, of which he was a decade long member, Foxton Ferguson collected folk songs from 1905 to 1909 including "May Day Carol" (second version) from Southill, Bedfordshire which he noted from the singing of Mr Charles Baldock in 1905. The tune "Southill" was included in Vaughan Williams' 1906 edition of The English Hymnal and also Songs of Praise but without acknowledgement. He had known Broadwood as early as 1899 when he sang in a solo quartet with her at Cambridge through the University Musical Society. In 1904 she had him perform on the third series of the Broadwood family's "Ladies Concerts" in the Midland Theatre with his then regular recital partner the soprano Beatrice Spencer (1877–1961).

In 1903, Foxton Ferguson sang the premieres of three duets based on German folk songs and arranged by Vaughan Williams (see above) which the singer himself had translated. In recital he also sang the composer's songs "Blackmwore by the Stour" and "Boy Johnny," the latter dedicated to the baritone James Campbell McInnes (1874–1945). The premiere of the Vaughan Williams Two Vocal Duets ("The Last Invocation" and "The Bird's Love Song") in 1904, which were the composers' first settings of Walt Whitman, were sung by Foxton Ferguson and Beatrice Spencer who had also sung the premieres of two of the German duets together.

Foxton Ferguson sang with the pioneering conductor Gwynne Kimpton (1873–1930) in her "Concerts for the Young" series in the years preceding the Great War, performing in Duke's Hall, Royal Academy of Music and Steinway Hall where he sang "Mother Goose's Rhymes."

On the evening of 28 March 1914, Ferguson gave a song recital under the auspices of The Institute of Arts and Sciences of Columbia University.

== The Folk-Song Quartet ==
The Folk-Song Quartet was Foxton Ferguson's invention and was composed of Beatrice Spencer, soprano, Florence Christie, mezzo-soprano, Louis Godfrey, tenor, and Foxton Ferguson as the bass. Singing repertoire from England, Scotland, Ireland and Wales the group was well-loved and performed extensively in England in the early part of the 20th century. In 1907, Daniel Mayer arranged a German tour for the group which started in Hamburg and toured to Berlin. The reception was warm and enthusiastic and Foxton Ferguson was disappointed that the tour couldn't be extended.

Background: On 3 June 1901, the TWestern Daily Press reported that a vocal quartet had been formed in London by Foxton Ferguson with a two-fold purpose; firstly, to have a well-practiced solo quartet ready for performances of the Choral Symphony, and secondly to study the large and ever increasing body of quartet repertoire. The members of this ensemble, which was singing together as early as 1900 on Ernest Walker's Balliol Sunday concert series, were the well-known Austrian soprano Miss Marie Fillunger, Miss Evelyn Downes, mezzo-soprano, Mr Seth Hughes, tenor, and Foxton Ferguson. One Year prior, a Foxton Ferguson concert in Steinway Hall featured a different quartet composed of Miss Fillunger, Miss Florence Shaw, Mr Walter Ford and Foxton Ferguson with Ernest Walker as accompanist. By December 1900, Florence Christie had become the mezzo-soprano of the quartet, which the public regarded as Miss Fillunger's quartet and, in 1903, a fatal chamber concert at Bechstein Hall sealed any hopes of the Wagnerian Cicely Gleeson-White taking over the soprano role. By 1904, Foxton Ferguson's group was billing itself regularly as the "Folk-Song Quartet" (it was sometimes also called "The Foxton Ferguson Vocal Quartet" and The "Folk-Singers" Quartet) and his longtime duet partner Beatrice Spencer had assumed the soprano role solidifying a stable and permanent ensemble for the next fifteen years.

== Lectures and teaching ==
Known for his wit, exuberance, and pithiness onstage, Foxton Ferguson was an expert lecturer on English folk song and gave presentations (where he both spoke and sang) in England, Germany, and on extensive tours of the United States in the years 1909–1914. Often appearing through colleges, libraries, and women's clubs, he lectured at Harvard University, The Mendelssohn Hall in New York, The Brooklyn Institute of Arts and Sciences, The Harvard Club, The Waldorf-Astoria, Philadelphia, the University of Minnesota, Newton, Massachusetts, Kansas City, Missouri, Portland, Oregon, Fort Worth, Texas, and Dallas. His lecture topics ranged from folk lore and folk songs to Christmas carols and songs of the sea.

Once at a high school in Dallas, Texas, in March 1913, Ferguson gave a two-hour lecture (both singing and speaking) on "Vagabondia, or Songs of the Open Road." In that lecture he said the following, "Vagabondage does not mean to me simply long hair and filth. It means being one's self. Every true vagabond is himself. It is of the greatest importance to be one's self." On the same trip, under the auspices of the Standard Club of Dallas, he lectured to an audience of two-hundred repeating over and over, "These songs are not England's any more than they are yours."

In 1904, Ferguson provided pre-opera lectures for Charles Manners' (1857–1938) Moody-Manners touring company (the larger) for its performances at the Theatre Royal, Drury Lane lecturing on Charles Gounod's Faust and Fromental Halévy's La Juive, and Richard Wagner's Tristan und Isolde and Lohengrin.

Around the outbreak of World War I, Foxton Ferguson became a Master at Eton College where he was beloved by his students through the last years of his life. An obituary in the Eton College Chronicle of 5 November 1920 reads, "His face was irresistibly humorous; you could not see him without feeling a keen interest in him. His singing (how often and how gladly we have heard him sing) was a constant joy, and abides, thought we shall never hear him sing again, a joy forever. ... you could not meet him without feeling some influence for good: always he lived in harmony with the best and in peace with all. ... to love others first, with or without return, is what matters most; ... he came to us already knowing it, it was in this spirit that he lived and died."

== Publications ==
In addition to his English translations he contributed to several music periodicals including The Academy & Literature, and The Girl's Own Paper. In the latter in October 1903, he contributed a "Schubert Fantasy" and from 1903 to 1904 as series of articles entitled "Music as a Profession for Girls." Foxton Ferguson is also thanked by his friend the American architect Alfred Hopkins for being a good friend and a reader in the preface of his 1920 book Modern Farm Buildings.

== Family ==
Foxton Ferguson's younger brother Rev. William Harold Ferguson (1874–1950) was also a composer, clergyman, and hymnbook editor. He followed in his brother's footsteps first as a chorister at Magdalen College and then as a student at Das Königliche Konservatorium der Musik zu Leipzig. On 19 January 1906, he accompanied a duo recital for Beatrice Spencer and Foxton Feguson in Alexandra Hall on Cookridge St. in Leeds.

== Death ==
Foxton Ferguson died unexpectedly of a duodenal ulcer while singing a concert on 2 November 1920 (The Cottage Hospital Littleham, Exmouth, Devonshire).
