= Household Music: Three Preludes on Welsh Hymn Tunes =

Household Music: Three Preludes on Welsh Hymn Tunes is a 1940 composition by Ralph Vaughan Williams. It was written for string quartet and can be adapted for other instruments.

The final hymn, "Aberystwyth", is played with eight variations. The premier performance of the piece was in an orchestral version at Bournemouth on 25 November 1940. the first performance of the piece as intended was at the Wigmore Hall on 4 October 1941.

== Contents ==
1. Fantasia: "Crug-y-bar"
2. Scherzo: "St. Denio"
3. Variation: "Aberystwyth"
