= James Biery =

American organist, composer and conductor

James Biery (born 1956) is an American organist, composer and conductor who is Minister of Music at Grosse Pointe Memorial Church (Presbyterian) in Grosse Pointe Farms, Michigan, where he directs the choirs, plays the 66-rank Klais organ and oversees the music program of the church. Prior to this appointment Biery was music director for Cathedrals in St. Paul, Minnesota and Hartford, Connecticut.

== Education ==
Biery was educated at Northwestern University, where he earned Bachelor and Master of Music degrees in Organ Performance as a student of Grigg Fountain and Wolfgang Rübsam. Mr. Biery also holds the Choirmaster and Fellowship Certificates of the AGO.

== Awards ==
Since 2006 James Biery has been awarded the ASCAP Plus award annually for his compositions. In 1986, he was the prize-winner for the highest score on the FAGO exam administered by the American Guild of Organists. The winner of several organ competitions, he was named Second Prize Winner in the 1980 AGO National Open Competition in Organ Playing.

== Works ==
His organ and choral compositions are published by MorningStar Music Publishers, Concordia, Augsburg Fortress, GIA, Oregon Catholic Press, and Boosey & Hawkes. He has recorded for AFKA and Naxos.

Mr. Biery developed his compositional skills from two disciplines: years of study of the organ and its literature and intense scrutiny of the orchestral scores of numerous composers whose music he transcribed for organ duet and organ solo. As an organist, Biery has distinguished himself by performing much of the repertoire of the nineteenth and early twentieth centuries. His facility at the organ combined with his demonstrated ability to perform and study a vast amount of literature has given Biery a firm basis upon which to compose for the instrument.

=== Choral ===
- ^ Part of the St. Louis Cathedral choral series

| Song title | Voicing | Description |
|---|---|---|
| At the Lamb's High Feast We Sing | SATB | This exciting setting of the Salzburg tune is highly effective for either Epiphany, Easter, or Communion. Biery dramatically mixes reverent moments of a cappella singing with moments of powerful organ. The choir also introduces a descant-like Biery tune in stanza three which is coupled with jubilant brass. A page for the congregation is included in the choral score. |
| Break Forth in Joyous Song | SATB (Optional Children's Choir, Congregation, Trumpet, and Keyboard) | This is a joyful hymn by James and Marilyn Biery to the familiar tune Marion. It is suitable for any service or interfaith service that can include a hymn of praise. |
| Choral Sentences for Holy Week and Easter | SATB a cappella/Solo or Unison/SATB and Organ | This is a medley of four "choral pictures" suitable as introits or short anthems. Palm Sunday—patient, plodding donkey carrying Jesus into Jerusalem; Maundy Thursday—prayerful petition; Good—plaintive melody with mournful accompaniment; Easter—women trudging to the tomb only to discover that Christ has risen. |
| Christ, the Solid Rock | SATB and Organ | This is a hymn-anthem with a new melody for "My Hope Is Built on Nothing Less." Undemanding choral writing is enhanced by an independent organ part. "Christ, the Solid Rock" begins quasi mysterioso, builds to triumphant climax (stanza 4), and ends in reflective mood. This piece brings new meaning to this beloved text. |
| Emmanuel Comes! An Advent Service of the Word | Organ (or Keyboard) and Congregation. Optional SATB, flute, oboe, and/or guitar | This collection of five selections for Advent includes two canticles, a song for the lighting of the Advent candles, a song for the presentation of the gifts, and a sung prayer. All texts are by Marilyn Biery with music by James Biery. Each component may be used individually, or they may by used together to create an entire service. |
| Lenten Communion Antiphons | SATB, cantor, and congregation | This collection contains antiphons for each Sunday in Lent. It is usable in all three years of the lectionary cycle. |
| O Little Town of Bethlehem^ | SATB and Organ (Traditional text with Joseph Barnby tune, Bethlehem) | It is a sensitive, English-style arrangement with a meditative anthem. |
| O Sacrum Convivium | SATB, a cappella | This piece contains harmonic structure based on continuous pedal-point combines with intricate text layering to evoke mood of sacred mystery. The final "alleluia" section builds to exultant climax, then fades away. This is one of MorningStar's bestsellers. |
| Stir Up Thy Power, O Lord | Unison, two-part, or SATB | The easy unison choral part can split into two or three parts at the anthem's climax, if desired. The organ part is semi-independent. The text is from the Collect for the third or fourth Sunday of Advent but is also appropriate for general use |
| The Beatitudes | SATB and Organ with optional Congregation (Matthew 5:3-12 or the parallel passage, Luke 6:20-26) | Marilyn Biery's insightful paraphrase of the Beatitudes combines with James Biery's flowing musical lines to make a hymn-anthem. This piece is suitable for general use and particularly appropriate when the Beatitudes are read. |
| The Lord Is My Shepherd | Unison treble choir or Soprano solo and SATB choir, a cappella | This is an easy but satisfying setting of Psalm 23 for combined children's and SATB choirs. It is perfect for combining church youth choirs – children through high school. |
| The Peace of Christ | SATB and Keyboard, Flute, Oboe, or Violin | This song of blessing is based on an original hymn tune by James Biery. It is useful for any time a blessing is appropriate, such as weddings, reception of new members, and baptisms. |
| Ubi caritas^ | SATB, a cappella | This is a setting of the complete traditional Maundy Thursday Latin text (the famous Duruflé motet only includes the first stanza) written in the style of Biery's "O Sacrum Convivium." Using sumptuous harmonies, it features a recurring statement of the text, "Where true love and charity are found, God is there." The chant-like verses inspire us to set aside petty quarrels and to experience, as one family, God's limitless and pure joy. This piece can be used throughout the year. |
| Word of God Eternal | SA (Hebrews 13:8 and a ninth century Latin hymn) | This is a challenging work for the treble chorus. |
