= Romanza (Paganini-Ponce) =

Instrumental composition for guitar

Romanza is an instrumental composition for guitar recorded by Andres Segovia in 1944, and again in 1967. The piece was credited to Niccolò Paganini, but based on themes from Paganini's Grand Sonata in A Major Op.39:II, arranged by Manuel Ponce. The piece was also recorded by Julian Bream.

The piece is distinct from Segovia's own arrangement of two Robert Schumann songs also titled "Romanza", recorded 1952 for Decca on DL 9647. John Williams recorded a piece called "Romanza" in 1982 credited as "traditional".
