= Alwin Michael Schronen =

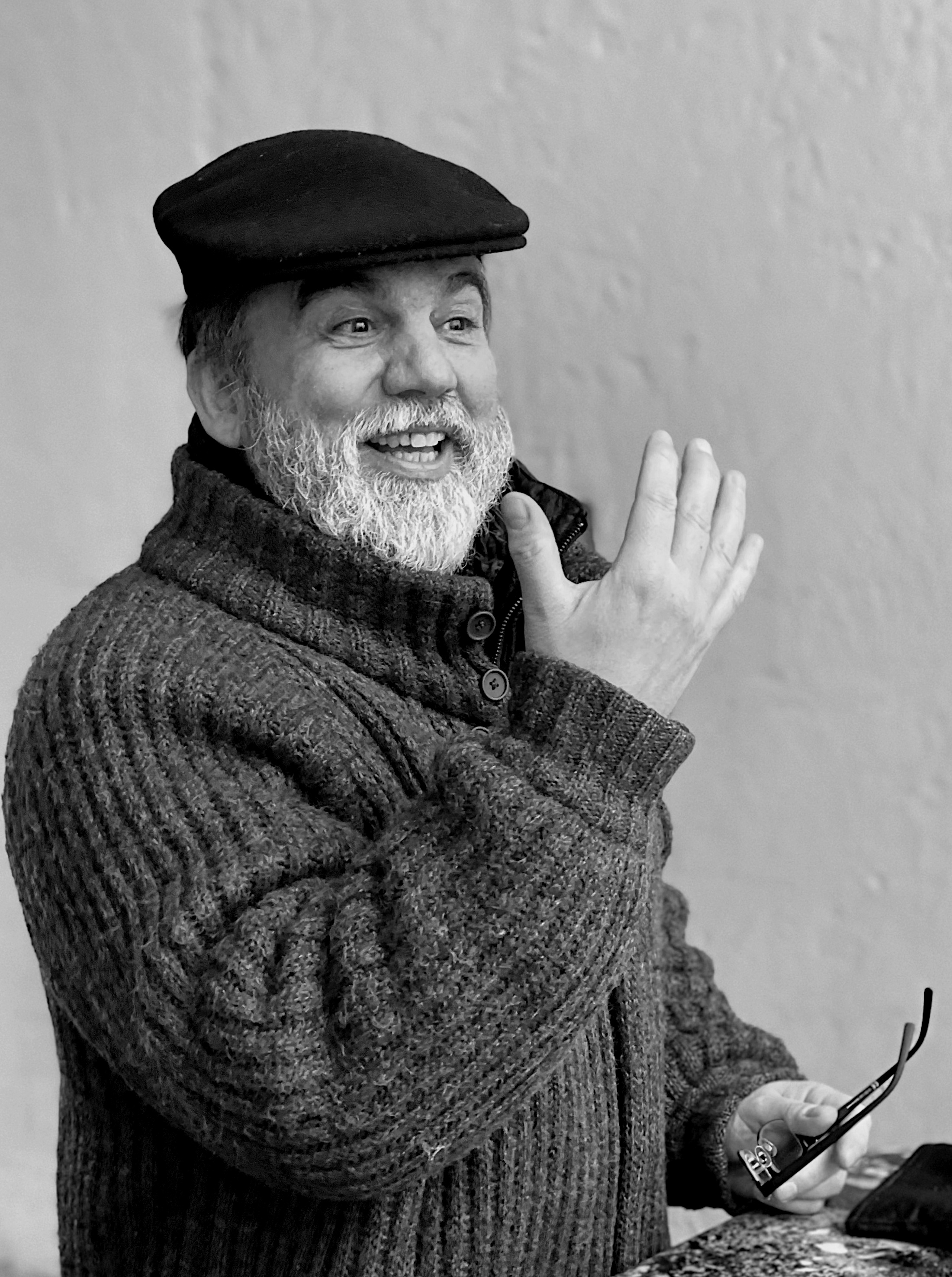
Schronen in 2021

Alwin Michael Schronen (born 19 December 1965) is a German composer, music publisher, producer and songwriter in dialect. He is known for choral works performed internationally.

== Life and career ==
Born in Daleiden on 19 December 1965, Schronen received lessons in trumpet, piano and organ as a child, with Josef Monter. He studied church music at the Bischöfliche Kirchenmusikschule in Trier and studied further at the Hochschule für Musik Saar, choral conducting with Andreas Göpfert and organ with Wolfgang Rübsam.

He began to compose in 1990, initially with a focus on sacred choral music. He later composed also secular choral music and instrumental music. He founded a music publishing house the same year, called AS Musikverlag and expanded it in 2022 by the label AS Music.

Schronen became internationally recognised when he travelled to Kyiv in February 2013, where the Academic Chamber Choir Kreschatyk performed a concert with twelve of Schronen's compositions including four world premieres. The Maîtrise Notre Dame de Paris performed his "Entre le bœuf et l'âne gris" at the [Saint-Sulpice in Paris.

Works by Schronen have been required works at choral competitions including the 2015 Cantarode Kerkrade and the 2017 Harmoniefestival Lindenholzhausen. His Magnificat for men's chorus was a required work at the 2023 Deutscher Chorwettbewerb in Hanover.

Schronen received commissions from the Camerata Musica Limburg, Matthias Beckert, Oliver Sperling, Jürgen Fassbender and Hans-Joachim Lustig. He set poems by Charles Anthony Silvestri and Rainer Maria Rilke to music.

== Works ==
Schronen's wrote more than 200 works and arrangements for choral genres and instrumental works in various scoring, including:

Men's chorus:

- Ich lebe mein Leben in wachsenden Ringen (2021) for three-part men's chorus a cappella
- Venite adoremus (2020) for four-part men's chorus, harp, cello and flute
- Flanders fields (2020) for four-part men's chorus a cappella
- Missa "O sacrum convivium" (2019) for four-part men's chorus a cappella
- Wessobrunner Gebet (2015) for four-part men's chorus, three-part boys' choir, strings, percussion and piano
- Sterne II (2015) for six-part men's chorus and Obertongesang a cappella
- Der Panther (2012) for men's chorus (TTTBB) a cappella; also for women's chorus
- Light & Love (2012) for men's chorus (TTTTBBBB) a cappella
- Magnificat (2013) for 4-6-part men's chorus
- O sacrum convivium (2012) for four-part men's chorus a cappella

Women's corus

- Reiselied (2018) for women's chorus (SSAA) a cappella
- Psalm 122 (2015) for women's chorus (SSAA) a cappella
- Tantum ergo (2015) for women's chorus (SSAA) a cappella
- "An den Mond" (2012) for women's chorus (SSAAA) a cappella. English version "Moon"

Mixed chorus

- Dornbirner Weihnachtskantate (2022) for soloists, choir, harp, strings, winds and percussion
- Invictus (2019) for eight-part choir a cappella
- Bruder-Konrad-Kantate (2018) for soprano, choir, winds and percussion
- Missa Hostadio (2018) for four-part choir and string quartet
- Die Welt, die monden ist (2017) for choir, piano and string quartet
- O-Antiphonen (2015) for four-part choir, organ and flute
- Cantate Domino (2015) for six-part choir a cappella
- Agnus Dei (2012) for choir (SSAATTBB) a cappella
- Bellum et pax (2013) for six-part choir
- Gloria (2012) for choir (SSAATTBB) a cappella
- Hodie Christus natus est (2012), motet for four-part choir a cappella
- Jakobus Messe (2007), German mass for choir (SATB), cantor, congregation, oprtional instruments
- Matthäus Messe (1996), mass for choir (SATB) and organ or wind-quartet
- Missa Argentina (2013) for choir (SATB) and optional organ, dedicated to Pope Francis
- Passio secundum Joannem (2009), St John Passion in German for soloists, choir, flute, clarinet, violin, organ and percussion
- Psalm 23 "Dominus pascit me" (2012) for choir (SSAATTBB) a cappella
- Sotzweiler-Mauritius-Messe (1994), mass for choir (SATB) a cappella
- Speyerer Hallelujah (2013) for choir (SATB), organ and optional winds

Instrumental

- Drei Tanzlieder (2006) fir wind quartet
- String Tango (2011) for clarinet and guitar
- Trio Linchisvillare (2012) string trio for two violins and cello

== Awards ==
- 2015: First prize at the 30th Valentin-Becker-Kompositionswettbewerb in Bad Brückenau for "Still blickt der Himmel" for six-part mixed choir
- 2015: Silver Platter Award from American Choral Directors Association for "Power of Nature" of eight-part mixed choir
- 2014: Recognition at the Call for Scores competition of the St Andrews Ensemble für Neue Musik und Choristi Sanctiandree“ from the University of St Andrews in Sotland, for "Power of Nature"
- 2012: Second prize of the Internationaler Kompositionswettbewerb of the choir association of North Rhine-Westphalia for "An den Mond" (SSAAA).

== Editions ==
Schronen's works have been published by Helbling Verlag, Schott, PH Publishers, AS Musikverlag and HAYO Musikverlag. Some of his works were published in collections from Bärenreiter, Gustav Bosse Verlag and Edition Peters.
