= Fantasia on Christmas Carols =

1912 work for baritone, chorus and orchestra by Ralph Vaughan Williams

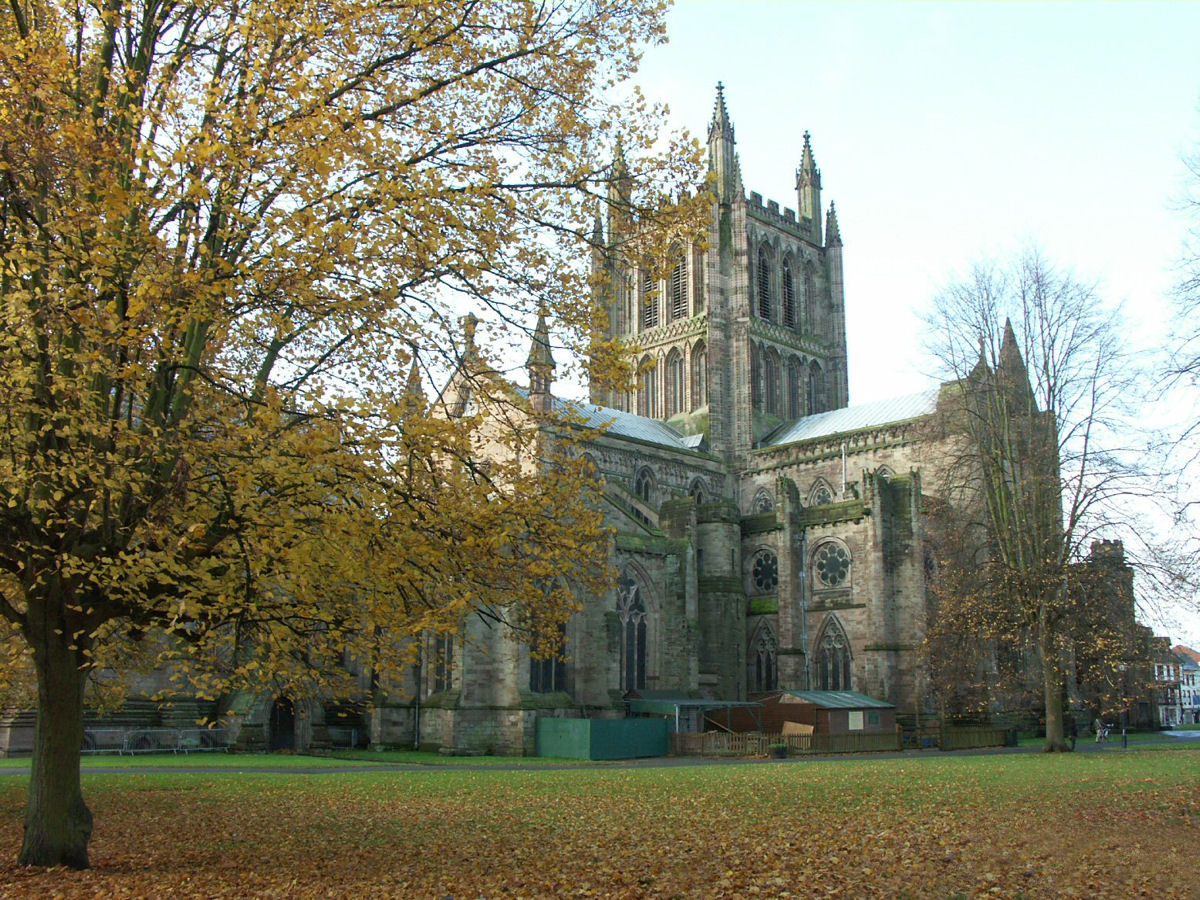
The Fantasia on Christmas Carols was first performed at Hereford Cathedral in 1912.

Fantasia on Christmas Carols is a 1912 work for baritone, chorus, and orchestra by the English composer Ralph Vaughan Williams.

It was first performed on September 12, 1912 at the Three Choirs Festival at Hereford Cathedral; it was conducted by the composer with the baritone Campbell McInnes.

The single-movement work of roughly twelve minutes consists of the English folk carols "The truth sent from above", "Come all you worthy gentlemen" and the Sussex Carol ("On Christmas night all Christians sing"), all folk songs collected in southern England by Vaughan Williams and his friend Cecil Sharp a few years earlier. These are interposed with brief orchestral quotations from other carols, such as The First Nowell. The early work remains popular with choral societies, and is sometimes paired with his longer Christmas work Hodie of 1954.

== Other versions ==
There is also a version of the Fantasia which replaces the orchestra with strings and organ. A purely orchestral version, in which the solo vocal and choral parts were 'cued in' on the orchestral instruments, was performed in Studio 8H, New York, on 19 December 1943 by the NBC Symphony conducted by Leopold Stokowski. The broadcast of this unpublished version, which was presumably arranged by the conductor, has been released on a 'Guild Historical' CD and is also uploaded on YouTube.

Tim Laughlin has created an arrangement for baritone, chorus, and wind ensemble. Todd Parrish has also arranged it for string orchestra.

== See also ==
- List of Christmas carols
