= Romance for viola and piano (Vaughan Williams) =

Vaughan Williams c. 1920

The Romance for Viola and Piano was one of many pieces found in Ralph Vaughan Williams' library after his death in 1958. The date of the composition is not known, but it is thought to date from around 1914. It is probable that it was written for the great English violist, Lionel Tertis, the dedicatee of Vaughan Williams's other pieces for viola: Flos Campi (1925) and the Suite for viola and small orchestra (1933–1934), the latter of which was written for Tertis.

The Romance is composed in arch form. It opens with soft, pentatonic murmurings from the piano, expanding into a rather melancholy and songful aria for the viola. The middle is somewhat restless and anguished, before closing in a similar manner to the beginning. The pentatonic modality is used throughout, though there are also stirring false relations and chromatic sections.

The premiere took place at a New Macnaghten Concert on 19 January 1962 with Bernard Shore on viola and Eric Gritton on piano. Despite its relative brevity and content, the piece has, since its publication by Oxford University Press in 1961, gained a place in the modern viola repertoire.
