= Five Mystical Songs =

Composition by Ralph Vaughan Williams

- Cantata by Ralph Vaughan Williams
- The composer, 1913
- Text: George Herbert: The Temple: Sacred Poems
- Language: English
- Published: 1911
- Scoring: soloist; choir; orchestra

The Five Mystical Songs are a musical composition by English composer Ralph Vaughan Williams (1872–1958), written between 1906 and 1911. The work sets four poems ("Easter" divided into two parts) by seventeenth-century Welsh poet and Anglican priest George Herbert (1593–1633), from his 1633 collection The Temple: Sacred Poems. While Herbert was a priest, Vaughan Williams himself was an atheist at the time (he later settled into a "cheerful agnosticism"), though this did not prevent his setting of verse of an overtly religious inspiration. The work received its first performance on 14 September 1911, at the Three Choirs Festival in Worcester, with Vaughan Williams conducting.

The work is written for a baritone soloist, with several choices for accompaniment:

- Piano only.
- Piano and string quintet.
- Wind ensemble.
- Orchestra with optional SATB chorus. This was the choice used at the premiere.

Like Herbert's simple verse, the songs are fairly direct, but have the same intrinsic spirituality as the original text. They were supposed to be performed together, as a single work, but the styles of each vary quite significantly. The first four songs are quiet personal meditations in which the soloist takes a key role, particularly in the third – Love Bade Me Welcome, where the chorus has a wholly supporting role (quietly and wordlessly singing the plainsong melody O Sacrum Convivium), and the fourth, The Call, in which the chorus does not feature at all. The final "Antiphon" is probably the most different of all: a triumphant hymn of praise sung either by the chorus alone or by the soloist alone; unlike the previous songs, a separate version is provided for a solo baritone. It is also sometimes performed on its own, as a church anthem for choir and organ: "Let all the world in every corner sing".

== Sections ==
=== 1. Easter ===
Easter – from Herbert's Easter

Rise heart; thy Lord is risen.
Sing his praise without delayes,
Who takes thee by the hand,
that thou likewise with him may'st rise;
That, as his death calcined thee to dust,
His life may make thee gold, and much more, just.

Awake, my lute, and struggle for thy part with all thy art.
The crosse taught all wood to resound his name, who bore the same.
His stretched sinews taught all strings, what key
Is the best to celebrate this most high day.

Consort both heart and lute, and twist a song pleasant and long;
Or since all musick is but three parts vied and multiplied.
O let thy blessed Spirit bear a part,
And make up our defects with his sweet art.

=== 2. I Got Me Flowers ===
I Got Me Flowers – from the second half of Easter

I got me flowers to strew thy way;
I got me boughs off many a tree:
But thou wast up by break of day,
And brought'st thy sweets along with thee.

The Sunne arising in the East.
Though he give light, and th'East perfume;
If they should offer to contest
With thy arising, they presume.

Can there be any day but this,
Though many sunnes to shine endeavour?
We count three hundred, but we misse:
There is but one, and that one ever.

=== 3. Love Bade Me Welcome ===
Love Bade Me Welcome – from Love (III)

Love bade me welcome: yet my soul drew back.
Guiltie of dust and sinne.
But quick-ey'd Love, observing me grow slack
From my first entrance in,
Drew nearer to me, sweetly questioning
If I lack'd anything.

A guest, I answer'd, worthy to be here:
Love said, You shall be he.
I the unkinde, ungrateful? Ah, my deare,
I cannot look on thee.
Love took my hand, and smiling did reply,
Who made the eyes but I?

Truth Lord, but I have marr'd them: let my shame
Go where it doth deserve.
And know you not, sayes Love, who bore the blame?
My deare, then I will serve.
You must sit down, sayes Love, and taste my meat:
So I did sit and eat.

=== 4. The Call ===
The Call – from The Call

Come, my Way, my Truth, my Life:
Such a Way, as gives us breath:
Such a Truth, as ends all strife:
Such a Life, as killeth death.

Come, my Light, my Feast, my Strength:
Such a Light, as shows a feast:
Such a Feast, as mends in length:
Such a Strength, as makes his guest.

Come, my Joy, my Love, my Heart:
Such a Joy, as none can move:
Such a Love, as none can part:
Such a Heart, as joyes in love.

=== 5. Antiphon ===
Antiphon – from Antiphon (I)

Let all the world in ev'ry corner sing:
My God and King.
The heavens are not too high,
His praise may thither flie;
The earth is not too low,
His praises there may grow.

Let all the world in ev'ry corner sing:
My God and King.
The Church with psalms must shout,
No doore can keep them out;
But above all, the heart
Must bear the longest part.

Let all the world in ev'ry corner sing:
My God and King.
