= Suite for Viola and Orchestra (Vaughan Williams) =

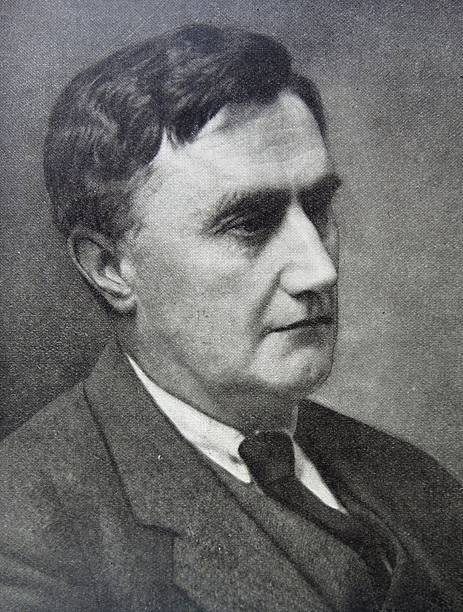
Portrait of Ralph Vaughan Williams by Herbert Lambert in the 1920s

The Suite for Viola and Orchestra (also called Suite for Viola and Small Orchestra) by Ralph Vaughan Williams is a work in eight movements for solo viola and orchestra composed in 1933 and 1934. The Suite is dedicated to violist Lionel Tertis, who premiered the work on November 12, 1934 at the Queen's Hall in London under the baton of Malcolm Sargent. A typical performance lasts about 23 minutes.

== Form ==
The work consists of eight movements, initially published in three groups.

Group 1

1. Prelude
2. Carol
3. Christmas Dance

Group 2

4. Ballad
5. Moto Perpetuo

Group 3

6. Musette
7. Polka Melancolique
8. Galop

The work is scored for solo viola, 2 flutes, 1 oboe, 2 clarinets, 2 bassoons, 2 horns, 2 trumpets, timpani, percussion, celesta, harp and strings.

== Discography ==
Complete recordings

- Bloch and Vaughan Williams – William Gromko (viola); Harriet Wingreen (piano); Classic Editions CE 1038 (mid- to late-1950s)
- Starer and Vaughan Williams – Melvin Berger (viola); John Snashall (conductor); English Chamber Orchestra (1965)
- Bliss and Vaughan Williams – Emanuel Vardi (viola); Frank Weinstock (piano); Musical Heritage Society 4043 (1979)
- Vaughan Williams – Frederick Riddle (viola); Norman Del Mar (conductor); Bournemouth Sinfonietta; recorded in 1977; Chandos Records CHAN 241-9 (1999)
- The Elegant Viola – Yizhak Schotten (viola); Kirk Trevor (conductor); Slovak Radio Symphony Orchestra; Crystal Records CD837 (2005)
- Vaughan Williams: Flos Campi, Suite • McEwen: Viola Concerto – Lawrence Power (viola); Martyn Brabbins (conductor); BBC National Orchestra and Chorus of Wales; Hyperion Records CDA67839 (2011)
- Music for Viola and Chamber Orchestra: Vaughan Williams, Martinů, Hindemith, Britten – Timothy Ridout (viola); Jamie Phillips (conductor); Orchestre de Chambre de Lausanne; Claves Records (2020)

Partial recordings

- Walton, Vaughan Williams, Howells & Bowen (Nos. 1–3) – Helen Callus (viola); Marc Taddei (conductor); New Zealand Symphony Orchestra; Asv CDDCA 1181 (2006)
