= Flos Campi =

Composition by Ralph Vaughan Williams

Vaughan Williams c. 1920

Flos Campi: Suite for Solo Viola, Small Chorus, and Small Orchestra is a composition by the English composer Ralph Vaughan Williams, completed in 1925. It is neither a concerto nor a choral piece, although it prominently features the viola and a wordless choir.

Its title is Latin for "flower of the field." In a program note for a 1927 performance, Vaughan Williams admitted that "The title Flos Campi was taken by some to connote an atmosphere of 'buttercups and daisies....'" In reality, the piece is unabashedly sensual and lushly orchestrated, which is quite appropriate considering its subject matter.

The first performance of Flos Campi, on 10 October 1925, was conducted by Sir Henry Wood, with the Queen's Hall Orchestra, violist Lionel Tertis (the dedicatee), and voices from the Royal College of Music. Initial reactions to the piece were mixed; Gustav Holst, a fellow composer and close friend of Vaughan Williams, said he "couldn't get hold of it," for which he was disappointed more with himself than with the work. Over time, however, it has become an accepted part of the musical canon even if infrequently performed.

The piece is divided into six movements, played without pause, each headed by a verse from the Song of Solomon:

1. Sicut Lilium inter spinas (Lento)
2. Jam enim hiems transiit (Andante con moto – quarter note = 104)
3. Quaesivi quem diligit anima mea (Lento – Allegro moderato)
4. En lectulum Salomonis (Moderato alla marcia –quarter note = 90)
5. Revertere, revertere Sulamitis! (Andante quasi lento)
6. Pone me ut signaculum (Moderato tranquillo)

As in his Sinfonia antartica, the quotations are intended to be read by the listener and are not part of the performance. The quotations are:

	Latin text	English translation
I	Sicut Lilium inter spinas, sic amica mea inter filias … Fulcite me floribus, stipate me malis, quia amore langueo.	"As the lily among thorns, so is my love among the daughters … Stay me with flagons, comfort me with apples; for I am sick with love."
II	Jam enim hiems transiit; imber abiit, et recessit; Flores apparuerunt in terra nostra, Tempus putationis advenit; Vox turturis audita est in terra nostra.	"For, lo, the winter is past, the rain is over and gone, the flowers appear on the earth, the time of pruning has come, and the voice of the turtle dove is heard in our land."
III	Quaesivi quem diligit anima mea; quaesivi illum, et non inveni … 'Adjuro vos, filiae Jerusalem, si inveneritis dilectum meum, ut nuntietis et quia amore langueo' … Quo abiit dilectus tuus, O pulcherrima mulierum? Quo declinavit dilectus tuus? et quaeremus eum tecum.	"I sought him whom my soul loveth, but I found him not … 'I charge you, O daughters of Jerusalem, if ye find my beloved, that ye tell him I am sick with love' … Whither is thy beloved gone, O thou fairest among women? Whither is thy beloved turned aside? that we may seek him with thee."
IV	En lectulum Salomonis sexaginta fortes ambiunt … omnes tenentes gladios, et ad bella doctissimi.	"Behold his bed [palanquin], which is Solomon's, three score valiant men are about it … They all hold swords, being expert in war."
V	Revertere, revertere Sulamitis! Revertere, revertere ut intueamur te … Quam pulchri sunt gressus tui in calceamentis, filia principis.	"Return, return, O Shulamite! Return, return, that we may look upon thee … How beautiful are thy feet with shoes, O Prince's daughter."
VI	Pone me ut signaculum super cor tuum.	"Set me as a seal upon thine heart."

In addition to the solo viola, the score calls for flute (doubling piccolo), oboe, clarinet, bassoon, horn, trumpet, percussion (bass drum, tabor, cymbals, and triangle), harp, celesta, and strings (not to number more than: 6 first violins, 6 second violins, 4 violas, 4 cellos, and 2 double basses). The eight-part chorus should consist of 20 to 26 singers (six to eight each of sopranos and altos plus four or five each of tenors and basses). The work lasts approximately 20 minutes.

The opening bars of the piece, which consist of a duet between the solo viola and the oboe, are well known as a classic example of bitonality.
