= Terra Nova =

Terra Nova (literally "New Earth" or "New Land") may refer to:

== Places ==
=== Antarctica ===
- Terra Nova Bay, Victoria Land
- Terra Nova Islands, a pair of small phantom islands near Antarctica
- Mount Terra Nova, a snow-covered mountain (2,130 m)

=== Brazil ===
- Terra Nova, Bahia, a municipality in Bahia
- Terra Nova, Pernambuco, a municipality in Pernambuco
- Terra Nova do Norte, a municipality in Mato Grosso
- Terra Nova River (Pernambuco), a river of Pernambuco

=== Canada ===
- Terra Nova Adventure Park, a playground in Richmond, British Columbia
- Newfoundland and Labrador, a province
  - Newfoundland (island), the island portion of the province of Newfoundland and Labrador, known as Terra Nova in Portuguese
  - Terra Nova (electoral district), Newfoundland and Labrador
  - Terra Nova, Newfoundland and Labrador, a town in Newfoundland and Labrador
  - Terra Nova National Park, a national park in Newfoundland
  - Terra Nova River, a Newfoundland river
  - Terra Nova oil field, an oil field development project 350 kilometres off the coast of Newfoundland
- Terra Nova, Nova Scotia, a community on Cape Breton Island
- Terra Nova, Ontario, a hamlet in Mulmur community

=== Italy ===
- Terranova di Sicilia, name used until 1927 for the municipality of Gela (CL), Sicily
- Terranova Pausania, name used until 1939 for the municipality of Olbia (OT), Sardinia
- Terranuova Bracciolini, municipality in the Province of Arezzo, Tuscany
- Terranova da Sibari, municipality in the Province of di Cosenza, Calabria
- Terranova dei Passerini, municipality in the Province of Lodi, Lombardy
- Terranova di Pollino, municipality in the Province of Potenza, Basilicata
- Terranova Sappo Minulio, municipality in the Province of Reggio Calabria, Calabria
- Terranova (Sicignano degli Alburni), hamlet in the municipality of Sicignano degli Albruni (SA), Campania

=== Puerto Rico ===
- Terranova, Quebradillas, Puerto Rico, a barrio of Puerto Rico

== Education ==
- Terra Nova School, a prep school in Cheshire, England
- Terra Nova High School (disambiguation), several schools
- TerraNova (test), a K–12 achievement test in the US

== Seafaring ==
- HMCS Terra Nova (DDE 259), a Canadian Restigouche-class destroyer escort
- Terra Nova Expedition, a British expedition led by Robert Falcon Scott to Antarctica
  - Terra Nova (ship), a sealing and then exploration ship, used in the Terra Nova Expedition
- Terra Nova FPSO, a floating production storage and offloading vessel in the Terra Nova oil and gas field
- MT Terra Nova, an oil tanker that caused an oil spill in Manila Bay

== Taxonomy ==
- Gressittacantha terranova, a springtail insect that lives in the Antarctic
- Terranova (nematode), a roundworm genus of the family Anisakidae

== Entertainment ==
=== Film, TV shows and theatre ===
- Terra Nova (TV series), a 2011 American science fiction series
- Terra Nova (1932 film), a 1932 Dutch documentary film
- Terra Nova (1991 film), a 1991 Italian film
- Terra Nova (1998 film), a 1998 Australian film
- Terra Nova (2008 film), a 2008 Russian film
- "Terra Nova" (Star Trek: Enterprise), first-season episode of Star Trek: Enterprise
- Terra Nova Theatre Group, a theatre company in Pittsburgh, Pennsylvania
- Terra Nova, a play by Ted Tally
- Terra Nova, a planet on the first-season episode Matter of Life and Death (Space: 1999)
- Terranova (TV), a German television channel

=== Music ===
- Terranova (band), a German electronic group
- Terra Nova (EP), the debut extended play by The Austerity Program
- "Terra Nova", a song written by James Taylor and Carly Simon, on James Taylor's album JT

=== Games and films ===
- Terra Nova (blog), a collaborative blog covering academic research in gaming
- Terra Nova: Strike Force Centauri, a 1996 computer game
- Nova Terra, a fictional character in the StarCraft series and Heroes of the Storm
- Terra Nova (TV series), an American science fiction drama television series

=== Fictional locations ===
- CMS Terra Nova, a supply ship owned by SCAF 200 years ago in the Dead Space 3 game and DLC Awakened
- Terra Nova, an Earth-colonized planet and the setting of the Heavy Gear series of games
- Terra Nova, one of the first Earth-colonized planets in the fictional Star Trek universe featured in the Star Trek: Enterprise episode of the same name
- Terra Nova, one of the first planets discovered by the Alphans, after the breakaway with the Earth, featured in the Space: 1999 episode "Matter of Life and Death"
- Terra Nova, a fictional colony of humans set 85 million years in the past in the TV series Terra Nova

== Other uses ==
- Terra Nova (journal), an earth science journal
- Terra Nova (newspaper), a weekly newspaper for the island of São Vicente in Cabo Verde
- Terranova (surname)
- Terra Nova (think tank), France
- Terra Nova 1260HP diesel hydraulic locomotive, a Romanian diesel locomotive built by Electroputere VFU since 2014
- Tara Nova, a Canadian drag queen
- Terra Nova (satellite) – Canadian satellite

== See also ==
- Terre-Neuve (disambiguation)
- Tierra Nueva (disambiguation)
