= List of compositions for viola: T to Z =

This article lists compositions written for the viola. The list includes works in which the viola is a featured instrument: viola solo, viola and piano, viola and orchestra, ensemble of violas, etc. Catalogue number, date of composition and publisher (for copyrighted works) are also included. Ordering is by composer surname.

This pages lists composers whose surname falls into the T to Z alphabetic range. For others, see respective pages: A to B, C to E, F to H, I to K, L to N, O to R, S.

== T ==
- Emil Tabakov (b. 1947)

Concerto for violа and orchestra (2006)
Sonata for viola and double bass (2005); Musica Publishing House, Sofia
Sonata for viola and trombone

- Dobrinka Tabakova (b. 1980)

Concerto for viola and string orchestra (2004); Valonius Press
Pirin for viola solo (2000); Valonius Press
Suite in Jazz Style for viola and piano (2008); Valonius Press
Suite in Old Style "The Court Jester Amareu" for solo viola, string ensemble and harpsichord (2006); Valonius Press
Whispered Lullaby for viola and piano (2004); Valonius Press

- Ricardo Tacuchian (b. 1939)

Toccata for viola and piano; Academia Brasileira de Música
Trio das Águas for clarinet, viola and piano; Academia Brasileira de Música
Xilogravura for viola and piano (2004); Academia Brasileira de Música

- Thomas Täglichsbeck (1799–1867)

Concertstück (Concert Piece) in C minor for viola and piano, Op. 49 (published 1867)

- Peter Tahourdin (1928–2009)

Music for Solo Viola (2001); Australian Music Centre

- Yoshihisa Taira (1937–2005)

Pénombres V for viola and piano (1996); Éditions Musicales Transatlantiques
Sonata for viola solo

- Yūji Takahashi (b. 1938)

Like Swans Leaving the Lake (白鳥が池を捨てるように) for viola and accordion (1995)
Mimi no ho (耳の帆), "Sail of the Ears" for shō, viola and reciter (1994)
Viola of Dmitri Shostakovich (ドミトリー・ショスタコーヴィチのヴィオラ) for viola solo (2002)

- Tōru Takemitsu (1930–1996)

A Bird Came Down the Walk (鳥が道に降りてきた) for viola and piano (1994); Schott Japan
A String around Autumn (ア・ストリング・アラウンド・オータム) for viola and orchestra (1989); Schott Japan
And Then I Knew 'Twas Wind (そして、それが風であることを知った) for flute, viola and harp (1992); Schott Japan

- Josef Tal (1910–2008)

Concerto for viola and chamber orchestra (1954); Israel Music Institute
Duo for viola and piano (1965); Israel Music Institute
Perspective for viola solo (1996); Israel Music Institute
Sonata for viola and piano (1960); Israel Music Institute
Suite for viola solo (1940); Israel Music Institute

- Robert Talbot (1893–1954)

Pièce for viola and piano

- Louise Talma (1906–1996)

Seven Episodes for flute, viola and piano (1988); Henmar Press; C.F. Peters

- János Tamás (1936–1995)

Feuerbilder for clarinet, viola and piano (1986)
Memento for alternating violin and viola with piano (1988)
Poema for viola and string orchestra (1952–1961, 1980); original for horn and string orchestra; Musik Verlag Nepomuk
Spiegelungen for alternating violin and viola (1990)
Traumquell for cello or viola and piano (1979)

- Tan Dun (b. 1957)

Dust in the Wind for piccolo and viola (1989)

- Alexander Taneyev (1850–1918)

Album Leaf (Листок из альбома) in G major for viola and piano, Op. 33

- Hilary Tann (b. 1947)

The Cresset Stone, Meditation for solo viola (1993); Oxford University Press
Duo for oboe and viola (1981); Oxford University Press
From the Song of Amergin for flute, viola and harp (1995); Oxford University Press

- Alexandre Tansman (1897–1986)

Alla Polacca for viola and piano (1987); Collection Panorama: Œuvres Contemporaines, Volume 1 (1987); Éditions Gérard Billaudot
Concerto for viola and orchestra (1936–1937); Éditions Max Eschig; Associated Music Publishers

- Mikael Tariverdiev (1931–1996)

Concerto in Romantic Style (Концерт в романтическом стиле) for viola and string orchestra, Op. 102 (1993)

- Phyllis Tate (1911–1987)

A Seasonal Sequence for viola and piano (1977); Oxford University Press
Variegations for viola solo (1970); Oxford University Press

- Jan Tausinger (1921–1980)

Concertino Meditazione for viola and chamber orchestra (1965); Český Hudební Fond; Schott Music Panton
Duetti Compatibili for soprano and viola (1971)
Hommage à Ladislav Černý for viola and piano (1971)
7 Michrochromophonies for clarinet, viola and piano (1977); Český Hudební Fond
Partita for viola and piano (1954); Český Hudební Fond; Schott Music Panton
Sonata for viola and piano; Český Hudební Fond

- Vilém Tauský (1910–2004)

Essay for viola solo (1965); CMA Publications

- Cornelia Tăutu (1938–2019)

De Doi (The Two) for viola and cello (1994)

- John Tavener (1944–2013)

The Myrrh-Bearer for viola, chorus and percussionist (1993); Chester Novello
Out of the Night for viola solo (1996); Chester Novello

- Matthew Taylor (b. 1964)

Concerto "Humoreskes" for viola and orchestra, Op. 41 (2010); Peters Edition
Fantasy Pieces for cello (or viola) and piano, Op. 30 (2002); Peters Edition
Trio "In Memoriam V. H." for flute, viola and cello, Op. 21 (1997); Peters Edition

- Zlata Tcaci (1928–2006)

Sonata for viola and piano (1981); Sovetskii Kompozitor; Karthause-Schmülling

- Boris Tchaikovsky (1925–1996)

From Kipling (Из Киплинга) for mezzo-soprano and viola (1994); Boris Tchaikovsky Society

- Pyotr Ilyich Tchaikovsky (1840–1893)

April (The Snowdrop), Op. 37b No. 10 (1875–1876); transcription for viola and piano by Vadim Borisovsky
Ardent Declaration (Страстное признание; Aveu Passionné); transcription for viola and piano by Vadim Borisovsky; Declaration of Love: Album of Popular Pieces for Viola and Piano (Страстное Признание: Альбом Популярных Пьес), Muzyka
January (At the Fireside), Op. 37b No. 1 (1875–1876); transcription for viola and piano by Vadim Borisovsky
June (Barcarolle), Op. 37b No. 6 (1875–1876); transcription for viola and piano by Lionel Tertis
May (White Nights), Op. 37b No. 5 (1875–1876); transcription for viola and piano by Vadim Borisovsky
Nocturne in D minor, Op. 19 No. 4 (1873); transcription for viola and piano by Vadim Borisovsky
None But the Lonely Heart, Op. 6 No. 6 (1869); transcription for viola and piano by William Primrose (1955)
October (Autumn Song), Op. 37b No. 10 (1875–1876); transcription for viola and piano by Vadim Borisovsky
Valse Sentimentale, Op. 56 No. 6 (1882); transcription for viola and piano by Vadim Borisovsky

- Georg Philipp Telemann (1681–1767)

Concerto in G major for viola and string orchestra, TWV 51:G9
Concerto in G major for 2 violas and string orchestra, TWV 52:G3
Parti Polonaise for 2 violas and bass; Gems Music Publications

- Jiří Teml (b. 1935)

Dvě folklórní studie (2 Folklore Studies) for flute, viola and harp (1999); Český Hudební Fond
Divertimento for violin and viola (2002)
Komorní hudba (Chamber Music) for viola and piano (2007); Český Hudební Fond
Monolog for viola solo (1981); Český Hudební Fond
Meditace a rozkoše (Meditation and Delights), 2 Movements for viola and harpsichord after Jan Zrzavý (1990)
Zelená flétna (The Green Flute), Melodrama on Verses of Miroslav Florian for reciter, flute, viola and harp (1983)

- James Tenney (1934–2006)

Blues for Annie for viola solo (1975)
Chorale for viola and harp (or piano) (1973)
For Viola for viola solo (1959); Frog Peak Music
Just a Bagatelle for viola solo (1959, 1999); Frog Peak Music
Song'n'Dance for Harry Partch for adapted viola, diamond arimba, strings and percussion (1999); Frog Peak Music
Spectrum 8 for solo viola and six instruments (2001); Frog Peak Music; Canadian Music Centre
Two Koans and a Canon for viola and tape-delay system (1982)

- Daniela Terranova (b. 1977)

Colore d'ombra for viola solo; Bèrben Edizioni Musicali

- Lionel Tertis (1876–1975)

Elizabethan Melody for viola and cello (published 1961); Bosworth & Co.
15th Century Folk Song: 1452-Anonymous for viola, cello and piano (published 1961); Bosworth & Co.
Hier au soir for viola and piano (published 1925); Schott Music
Old Irish Air for viola and piano (published 1925); G. Schirmer; Schott Music
Rêverie for viola and piano
Sunset (Coucher du Soleil) for viola and piano (published 1923); Chester Music; Comus Edition
Three Sketches for viola and piano

1. Serenade; revised as A Tune
2. The Blackbirds (1952); Comus Edition
3. The River; Comus Edition

A Tune for viola and piano (published 1954); 2nd version of Serenade; Comus Edition
Variations on a Four Bar Theme of Handel for viola and cello (published 1961); Francis, Day & Hunter
Variations on a Passacaglia of Handel for 2 violas (1935); Comus Edition

- Dimitri Terzakis (b. 1938)

Daphnis and Chloe for soprano and viola (1993–1994); Edition Gravis
Etanos for viola and piano (2006); Müller & Schade
Hero und Leander, Rhapsody for narrator, viola, piano and audiotape (2002–2003); Edition Gravis
Musica aeolica, 2 Pieces for violin and viola (1978); Breitkopf & Härtel
Myrrhentropfen for viola and piano (1993); Edition Gravis
Solo for Tanja for viola solo (2004); Edition Gravis
Sonetto for viola and piano (1993); Edition Gravis
Visionen, die Schalen des Zorns betreffend for chorus and viola ad libitum (2004); Edition Gravis

- Flavio Testi (1923–2014)

Musica da Concerto No. 6 for viola and chamber orchestra, Op. 20 (1970); Ricordi

- Christopher Theofanidis (b. 1967)

Concerto for viola and chamber orchestra (2002); Opus 125 Publishing
Flow, My Tears for viola solo (1997); Opus 125 Publishing

- Ferdinand Thieriot (1838–1919)

2 Adagios for cello or viola and organ, Op. 41 (1887)
Concerto in C major for violin, viola and orchestra, Op. 92 (1910)
Larghetto in B minor for viola and organ, Op. 76 No. 1

- Johannes Paul Thilman (1906–1973)

Aspekte for flute, viola and harp (1971); Edition Peters
6 Duets for violin and viola (1964); Edition Peters
Sonata in C♯ minor for viola and piano (1935)
Trio Piccolo for alto flute, bass clarinet and viola, Op. 90 (1959); Edition Peters

- Maurice Thiriet (1906–1972)

Suite en Trio for flute, viola and harp (1955–1956); Les Nouvelles Éditions Méridian

- Anna S. Þorvaldsdóttir (b. 1977)

Emotional Landscape of a Charmed Friendship for viola solo (2006); Íslenzk Tónverkamiðstöð

- Xaver Paul Thoma (b. 1953)

Concerto for viola and orchestra, Op. 34, XPT 46 (1984, revised 1988); edition 49
Die Blumen II (The Flowers II) for soprano and viola, XPT 146 (2006); edition 49
Die Traumtragenden (The Bearers of Dreams) for 8 violas and soprano, Op. 12, XPT 15 (1975); edition 49
Drei Impressionen nach Gedichten von Paul Celan (3 Impressions after Poems of Paul Celan) for 2 violas, Op. 22b, XPT 27 (1980); edition 49
Duet for English horn and viola, XPT 72 (1988); edition 49
Entdeckungen (Discoveries), 10 Miniatures for Young Violists, XPT 156 (2007); edition 49
Fragment for viola and organ, XPT 50 (1984); edition 49
In Erwartung for viola solo, XPT 62 (1985); edition 49
In ferner Erwartung – Träume – Stille for 8 violas, XPT 84 (1992); edition 49
Kleine Sonate (Little Sonata) for violin and viola, Op. 5, XPT 6 (1973); edition 49
Lathe Biosas I for 6 violas, Op. 29 No. 1, XPT 38 (1982); edition 49
3 Lieder (3 Songs) for alto and viola, Op. 11, XPT 14 (1974); edition 49
Mein umdunkeltes Herz for soprano, viola and piano, XPT 113 (1988); edition 49
M'illumino d'immenso – Nachtstück III (Nocturne III) for viola and cello, Op. 31b, XPT 43 (1983); edition 49
Nachtstück II (Nocturne II) for 4 violas, Op. 31a, XPT 42 (1983); edition 49
Nachtstück IV (Nocturne IV) for violin and viola, Op. 31c, XPT 44 (1983); edition 49
Phantasie for 2 violas, Op. 10, XPT 13 (1974); edition 49
Psalm 86 for mezzo-soprano, viola and organ, Op. 40 (1985); edition 49
Reflexionen eines musikalischen Traumas (Reflections of a Musical Trauma) for viola and orchestra, Op. 20, XPT 24 (1979); edition 49
Requiem für einen Hund (In Memoriam Agapi) (Requiem for a Dog) for 5 violas and cello, XPT 61 (1985); edition 49
Sonata [No. 1] for viola solo, Op. 26, XPT 36 (1982); edition 49
Sonata No. 2 for viola solo, XPT 71 (1988); edition 49
Sonata No. 3 for viola solo, XPT 109 (1998); Antes Edition; edition 49
Sonata No. 4 for viola solo, XPT 158a (2008); Ikuro Edition
Sonata for viola and piano, XPT 81 (1990–1991); Antes Edition; edition 49
Studie "El Escorial" for viola solo, XPT 65 (1987); edition 49
William Byrd Mass a 3 Voices for 3 violas, XPT 40 (1982); edition 49

- Ambroise Thomas (1811–1896)

Souvenir, Duetto in E major for violin or viola and piano (1854)

- Augusta Read Thomas (b. 1964)

Cantos for Slava for viola and piano (2007); original for cello and piano; G. Schirmer
Chant for viola and piano (1991); G. Schirmer
Dream Catcher for viola solo (2008); original for violin; G. Schirmer
Incantation for viola solo (1995, 2002); original for violin; G. Schirmer
Pulsar for viola solo (2003); original for violin; G. Schirmer
Rumi Settings for violin and viola (2001); G. Schirmer
Silent Moon for violin and viola (2006); G. Schirmer
Toft Serenade for viola and piano (2006, 2011); original for violin and piano; G. Schirmer

- Theodore Thomas (1835–1905)

Divertissement for viola and piano (1860); American Viola Society Publications

- Olav Anton Thommessen (b. 1946)

Cantabile "Etyde-Cadenza" for solo viola; Music Information Centre Norway
Sort sang (Black Song) for viola and piano (1992); Music Information Centre Norway

- Randall Thompson (1899–1984)

Suite for oboe, clarinet and viola (1940); E.C. Schirmer

- Virgil Thomson (1896–1989)

Sonata da chiesa for viola, clarinet, trumpet, horn and trombone (1926, revised 1973); Boosey & Hawkes

- Lasse Thoresen (b. 1949)

Tidehverv (At a Juncture), 3 Pieces for viola and cello (2007); Pizzicato Verlag Helvetia; Clivis Publicacions

- Francis Thorne (1922–2017)

Rhapsodic Variations No. 4 for viola solo (1987); Merion Music; Theodore Presser Company; American Composers Alliance
Double Concerto "Gemini Variations" for orchestra with viola and double bass obbligati (1967–1968); American Composers Alliance
Triple Concerto for viola, English horn, bass clarinet and orchestra (2003–2004); Theodore Presser Company
Vi-oh-la-la for solo viola (2009); Merion Music; Theodore Presser

- Ludwig Thuille (1861–1907)

Trio in E♭ major for violin, viola and piano (1885)

- Bertha Tideman-Wijers (1887–1976)

Adagio en Andante cantabile in F and D major for viola and piano
Andante cantabile in A major for viola and piano

- Jukka Tiensuu (b. 1948)

oddjob for viola and electronics (1995); Finnish Music Information Center

- Heinz Tiessen (1887–1971)

Musik für Viola mit Orgel (Music for Viola with Organ), Op. 59 (c.1950, published 1964); Ries & Erler
Zwei Ernste Weisen (2 Serious Melodies) for viola and piano (published 1948); Ries & Erler

- László Tihanyi (b. 1956)

50 misure a S. (50 Bars for S.) for violin and viola, Op. 56 (2011)
Ductus for viola solo, Op. 3 (1986)
Nyolc invokáció a Hold fázisaihoz (Eight Invocations to the Lunar Phases) for viola and piano, Op. 53 (2010–2011); Editio Musica Budapest
Passacaglie for viola and orchestra, Op. 49 (2009); Editio Musica Budapest

- Frederick Tillis (1930–2020)

Capriccio for viola and piano (1960); American Composers Alliance
Phantasy for viola and piano (1962); P & P Publications
Three Showpieces for viola unaccompanied (1966); American Composers Alliance

- Michael Tippett (1905–1998)

Triple Concerto for violin, viola, cello and orchestra (1978–1979); Schott Music

- Antoine Tisné (1932–1998)

Concerto for viola and orchestra (1985)
Horizons for clarinet and viola (1987); Éditions Gérard Billaudot; United Music Publishers
Sonata for viola and piano (1989); Éditions Gérard Billaudot; United Music Publishers

- Steve Tittle (b. 1935)

4 Messages for viola and percussion (1984); Canadian Music Centre

- Katia Tiutiunnik (b. 1967)

Al-Hisar for viola solo (2001); Australian Music Centre
Dumuzi's Embrace for viola solo (2018); Australian Music Centre
Jehanne for soprano and viola (2007); text by Elisabetta Faenza Brandson; Australian Music Centre
Nights in Arabia for solo viola and orchestra (1992, revised 1998); Australian Music Centre
Prayer for viola solo (2002); Australian Music Centre
White Night for viola solo (2006); Australian Music Centre

- Ernst Toch (1887–1964)

Divertimento for violin and viola, Op. 37 No. 2 (1925); Schott Music
Impromptu (in three movements) for viola solo, Op. 90b (1963); Mills Music Company
Serenade for 2 violins and viola, Op. 25 (1916); Delkas Music Publishing

- Václav Tomášek (1774–1850)

Grand Trio in E♭ major for violin, viola and piano, Op. 7 (1800)

- Henri Tomasi (1901–1971)

Concerto for viola and orchestra (1950); Éditions Alphonse Leduc

- Haukur Tómasson (b. 1960)

Birting (Illumination) for viola solo (1986); Íslenzk Tónverkamiðstöð

- Vincenzo Tommasini (1878–1950)

Concerto for string quartet and orchestra (1938); G. Ricordi

- Tôn-Thất Tiết (b. 1933)

Contemplation for viola and orchestra (1994–1997); Éditions Billaudot
The Endless Murmuring III for viola, bassoon and harp (1995); Éditions Jobert
Lang dzu for clarinet, viola and cello (1996)
Lang Dzu II for clarinet, viola and cello (1997)
Lang Dzu III for clarinet, viola and cello (2004)
Terre-Feu for viola solo (1981); Éditions Jobert

- Vieri Tosatti (1920–1999)

Concerto for viola and orchestra (1966)

- Charles Tournemire (1870–1939)

Suite en trois parties (Suite in Three Parts) for viola and piano, Op. 11 (1897); Éditions Max Eschig

- Donald Francis Tovey (1875–1940)

Sonata in B♭ major for clarinet (or violin, or viola) and piano, Op. 16 (1906); Edition Schott
Trio in D minor for violin, English horn (or viola) and piano, Op. 14 (1903); Edition Schott

- Joan Tower (b. 1938)

Simply Purple for viola solo (2008); G. Schirmer
Purple Rhapsody for viola and orchestra (2005); G. Schirmer
Purple Rush for viola solo (2016); G. Schirmer
Wild Purple for viola solo (1998); G. Schirmer

- Douglas Townsend (1921–2012)

Canzona for flute, viola and bassoon (1950)
Duo for 2 violas, Op. 5 (1957); Edition Peters

- Vlastimir Trajković (1947–2017)

Concerto in G minor for viola and orchestra, Op. 23 (1993)
Sonata in D major for violin and viola, Op. 20 (1987)

- Herbert Trantow (1903–1993)

Duo for viola and piano (1936); Mitteldeutscher Verlag

- Martino Traversa (b. 1960)

Quartetto for viola solo (2006); Edizioni Suvini Zerboni

- Karl Ottomar Treibmann (1936–2017)

Tonspiele for viola solo (2007); Friedrich Hofmeister Musikverlag

- Ronald Tremain (1923–1998)

Nine Studies for violin and viola (1960); Centre for New Zealand Music
Three Poems of James Joyce for baritone and viola (1975, revised 1990); Centre for New Zealand Music
Three Songs for soprano and viola (1960); Centre for New Zealand Music

- George Tremblay (1911–1982)

Duo for viola and piano (1966); American Composers Alliance

- Gilles Tremblay (1932–2017)

En partage, Concerto for viola and orchestra (2002); Canadian Music Centre

- Georg Trexler (1903–1979)

Sonatina for viola and piano (1953); Breitkopf & Härtel

- Lester Trimble (1923–1986)

Duo for viola and piano (1949); C.F. Peters

- Julia Tsenova (1948–2010)

Step and Rag-Time for viola and piano (1981)
Three Frescoes with Epilogue for viola and piano (1976)

- Karmella Tsepkolenko (b. 1955)

Duel-Duo No. 6 (Дуель-Дует №6) for 2 violas (1997)
Solo-Momento No. 3 (Соло-Моменто №3) for viola solo (2003)

- Sulkhan Tsintsadze (1925–1991)

2 Pieces for viola and piano (1948)

Khorumi, Georgian Dance (ხორუმი; Хоруми, Грузинский танец); Gosudarstvennoe muzykalnoe izdatelstvo (State Music Publishing House); Muzyka
Romance (Романс); Muzykalnyi fond Gruzinskoi SSR

Sachidao (საჭიდაო; Сачидао) for viola and piano (1950); also for cello and piano; Russian Music Archive

- George Tsontakis (b. 1951)

Fantasy for viola and piano (1976)
Lullaby of Crete for soprano, flute, viola and harp (1999)
Requiescat for viola and piano (1996); Merion Music; Theodore Presser Company
Seven Knickknacks for violin and viola; Poco Forte Music

- Calliope Tsoupaki (b. 1963)

Enigma for viola solo (1999); Donemus
Medea (Μήδεια) for viola and 3 female voices (1996); words by Euripides
When I Was 27 (Στα 27 μου χρόνια) for viola and double bass (1990); Donemus

- Eduard Tubin (1905–1982)

Pastorale for viola and organ, ETW 62 (1956); Warner/Chappell Music Scandinavia
Sonata for viola and piano, ETW 63 (1964–1965); Nordiska Musikförlaget
Sonata for alto-saxophone and piano, ETW 61 (1951); transcribed for viola and piano; Nordiska Musikförlaget

- Antonín Tučapský (1928–2014)

Concerto for viola and orchestra (1996); British Music Information Centre
Duo Concertante for viola and guitar (1989); British Music Information Centre
Sonata for viola and piano (2002); Roberton Publications

- Fisher Tull (1934–1994)

Sonata for viola and piano (1962); Boosey & Hawkes

- Joaquín Turina (1882–1949)

Andante from Sevilla, Op. 2 (1908); transcribed for viola and piano by Vadim Borisovsky
Escena andaluza (Scène Andalouse) for viola, string quartet and piano, Op. 7 (1911); A. Zunz-Mathot, Paris 1913

- José Luis Turina (b. 1952)

Concerto for viola and string orchestra (1985)
Divertimento, aria y serenata for 8 violas (1987); Edición Pypartes
Dos duetos (2 Duets) for viola and piano (1988, 1992); original for cello and piano
La commedia dell'arte for flute, viola and guitar (1986), or flute, viola and harp (1990)
Sonata da chiesa for viola and piano (1986–1987)
Tres contrapuntos for 2 violas (1979)

- Mark-Anthony Turnage (b. 1960)

Eulogy for solo viola and orchestra (2003); Boosey & Hawkes
On Opened Ground, Concerto for viola and orchestra (2000–2001); Schott Music

- Robert Turner (1920–2012)

Concerto for viola and orchestra (1986–1987); Canadian Music Centre
A Group of Seven: Poems of Love and Nature by Canadian Poets for viola, narrator and orchestra (1991); Canadian Music Centre
Suite in Homage to Melville for soprano, alto, viola and piano (1966); Canadian Music Centre
Time for Three, 3 Songs for mezzo-soprano, viola and piano (1985); Canadian Music Centre

- Burnet Corwin Tuthill (1888–1982)

Sonata for viola (or saxophone) and piano, Op. 20 (1947); Southern Music Company

- Erkki-Sven Tüür (b. 1959)

Illuminatio, Concerto for viola and orchestra (2008)

== U ==
- Åke Uddén (1903–1987)

Duo "Småprat" (Small Talk) for 2 violas (1933); STIM; Swedish Music Information Centre
Sonata in D major for flute and viola, Op. 2 (1931); STIM; Swedish Music Information Centre
Sonatina for viola solo, Op. 3 (1933, revised 1986); STIM; Swedish Music Information Centre

- Ken Ueno (b. 1970)

12.12.12 for flute (with glissando head joint) and viola (2012)
Hypnomelodiamachia for viola, percussion and electronics (2007)
Song for Sendai for singing violist (2011)
Talus for viola and live electronics (2006)
Talus, Concerto for viola and string orchestra (2007)
Two Hands for viola and percussion (2009)

- Alfred Uhl (1909–1992)

Commedia musicale for clarinet, viola and piano (1982)
10 Divertimenti for viola and cello (1924)
20 Etüden for viola solo (1971); Schott Music
30 Etüden for viola solo (1972); Schott Music
Kleines Konzert for clarinet, viola and piano (1937, revised 1988); L. Doblinger
Kleine Suite for viola solo (1973); Schott Music
4 Lieder aus der Heiteren Kantate "Wer Einsam ist, der Hat es Gut" for soprano, viola and piano (1984); Doblinger
Stimmungsbild for viola and piano (1923)

- Lloyd Ultan (1929–1998)

Dialogues II for viola and cello (1980); American Composers Alliance
Dialogues III for violin and viola (1982); American Composers Alliance
Love's Not Time's Fool for soprano, violin and viola (1995); American Composers Alliance
Sonata for viola and piano (1976); American Composers Alliance

- Chinary Ung (b. 1942)

Khse Buon for solo viola (1980); C. F. Peters

- Victor Urbancic (1903–1958)

Fantasie und Fuge for viola and piano, Op. 9 (1937); Íslenzk Tónverkamiðstöð

- Guillermo Uribe Holguín (1880–1971)

Concerto for viola and orchestra, Op. 109 (1962)
Escena cómica (Comic Scene) for violin and viola, Op. 108 No. 2
Pequeña suite (Little Suite) for violin, viola and flute, Op. 96 (1955)
Sonata for viola and piano, Op. 24 (1924)

- İlhan Usmanbaş (1921–2025)

Viyola ve Piyano için for viola and piano (1961)
Partita for viola solo (1985)

- Yolande Uyttenhove (1925–2000)

Sonata for viola and piano, Op. 146 (1989); CeBeDeM

== V ==
- Dalibor Cyril Vačkář (1906–1984)

Tři dialogy (3 Dialogues) for viola solo (1961); Český Hudební Fond

- Emanuel Vahl (b. 1938)

Jewish Duet for viola and guitar or piano, Op. 69b (2000); Israeli Music Center
Sonata for viola solo, Op. 2 No. 2 (1968); Israeli Music Center
Sonata for viola and piano, Op. 89 (2004); Israeli Music Center
Suite for 2 violas, Op. 67b, for viola and cello, Op. 67d, for violin and viola, Op. 67e (1999); original for 2 cellos; Israeli Music Center

- János Vajda (b. 1949)

Szólószonáta (Solo Sonata) for viola solo (2004); Editio Musica Budapest Contemporary Music

- Reza Vali (b. 1952)

Calligraphy No. 5 for viola solo (2003); MMB Music

- Mary Jeanne van Appledorn (1927–2014)

4 Duos for viola and cello (1986); Arsis Press

- Nancy Van de Vate (1930–2023)

Viola Concerto (1990); Vienna Masterworks
6 Etudes for solo viola (1969); Arsis Press
A Long Road Travelled, Suite for solo viola and string quartet (2007); Vienna Masterworks
Music for Viola, Percussion and Piano (1976); Vienna Masterworks
Viola Sonata (1964); Tritone Press; Vienna Masterworks
Suite for solo viola (1975); American Composers Alliance

- Leopold van der Pals (1884–1966)

Concertino for saxophone or viola and string orchestra, Op. 108
Musik zu «Die Geheimnisse» von Goethe (Music for Goethe's "The Mysteries") for viola and piano, Op. 220
Sonata for viola solo, Op. 146

- David Van Vactor (1906–1994)

Concerto for viola and orchestra (1940); Roger Rhodes Music
Duo (3 Pieces) for viola and double bass (1966); Roger Rhodes Music
Divertimento for 2 violins and viola (1936, 1942); Roger Rhodes Music

- Arnold van Wyk (1916–1983)

Duo Concertante for viola and piano (1962–1976)

- Komitas Vardapet (1869–1935)

The Crane for viola and percussion (1911)
It Is Spring, but Snow Has Fallen for voice, viola, piano and percussion (1905–1906)

- Emanuel Vardi (1917–2011)

Suite Based on American Folk Songs for viola and piano (1977); Emvar Music Publishing
Suite on American Folk Songs for viola and orchestra (or piano) (1944); G. Schirmer

- Víctor Varela (b. 1955)

Viola pomposa for viola solo (2006); STIM; Swedish Music Information Centre

- Judit Varga (b. 1979)

Dialog for clarinet, viola and piano (2004)
Ewig, ewig for viola solo and ensemble (2006)
10 Portraits for viola solo (2010)
Strictly Ballroom IV for baritone saxophone, bayan and viola (2006)
Unausgesprochen for viola solo (2004)

- Sergei Vasilenko (1872–1956)

Lullaby (Колыбельная) for viola and piano (1950s)
Oriental Dance (Восточный танец) in G minor for clarinet or viola and piano, Op. 47 (1922)
4 Pieces (4 Пьесы) for viola and piano (1953)
4 Pieces on Themes from 16th and 17th-Century Lute Music (Четыре пьесы на темы лютневой музыку XVI и XVII вв.) for cello (or viola) and piano, Op. 35 (1918); Gosudarstvennoe muzykalnoe izdatelstvo (State Music Publishing House); Universal Edition
Sleeping River (Спящая река) for viola and piano (1951)
Sonata in D minor for viola and piano, Op. 46 (1923); Gosudarstvennoe muzykalnoe izdatelstvo (State Music Publishing House)
Zodiakus I.A.S. (after Unknown Authors of the 18th Century) (Сюита из произведений неизвестных авторов XVIII века), Suite for viola and piano (1914, 1930s)

- Pēteris Vasks (b. 1946)

Concerto for viola and string orchestra (2014–2015); Schott Music
Mazā vasaras mūzika (Little Summer Music; Kleine Sommermusik) for viola and piano (1985, 2012); original version for violin and piano; Schott Music

- Auguste Vaucorbeil (1821–1884)

Sonata for viola and piano (published 1862)

- Ralph Vaughan Williams (1972–1958)

Fantasia on Greensleeves (1934); adapted from Sir John in Love; transcription for viola and piano by Watson Forbes; Oxford University Press
Flos Campi for viola, wordless chorus and small orchestra (1925)
Four Hymns for tenor, viola and string orchestra (1914)
Romance for viola and piano (c.1914); Oxford University Press
Six Studies in English Folk Song for cello or viola and piano (1926); Stainer & Bell
Suite for viola and small orchestra (1933–1934); Oxford University Press
A Winter's Willow (A Country Song) (1903); transcription for viola and piano by Ronald C. Dishinger (1993), Medici Music Press

- Octavio Vázquez (b. 1972)

Sonata No. 1 for viola and piano (1992)
Sonata No. 2 for viola and piano (2002)
Trio for flute, viola and cello (2003)

- Lucie Vellère (1896–1966)

Epitaphe pour un ami (Epitaph for a Friend) for viola and string orchestra (1964); CeBeDeM
Sonata for violin and viola (1961); CeBeDeM

- Ian Venables (b. 1955)

Acton Burnell for tenor, viola and piano, Op. 30 (1997); words by Rennie Parker
Elegy for viola and piano, Op. 2a (1980); original version for cello and piano
Soliloquy for viola and piano, Op. 26 (1994)

- Alexander Veprik (1899–1958)

Chant rigoureux (Строгий напев) for viola and piano, Op. 9 (1926); original for clarinet and piano; transcription by Vadim Borisovsky
Kaddish (Кадиш: Поэма), Poem for viola and piano, Op. 6 (1925); Edition Schott
Rhapsodie (Рапсодия) for viola and piano, Op. 11 (1926); Muzyka; Universal Edition
Songs of the Dead (Песни об умерших; Totenlieder) for viola and piano, Op. 4 (1923)

- Theo Verbey (1959–2019)

Hommage II for viola solo (1995); Donemus

- Carl Verbraeken (b. 1950)

Schaduwdans for viola and piano (2013); CWV1611

- Sándor Veress (1907–1992)

Memento for viola and double bass (1983); Edizioni Suvini Zerboni
Nógrádi verbunkos for viola and string orchestra (1940, 1956); arrangement by D. Marton; Musikverlag Müller & Schade

- Antonio Veretti (1900–1978)

Bicinia for violin and viola (1975); Edizioni Suvini Zerboni

- John Verrall (1908–2001)

Concerto for viola and orchestra (1969); American Composers Alliance
Sonata No. 1 for viola and piano (1942); Dow Music; American Composers Alliance
Sonata No. 2 for viola and piano (1963); Edition Peters
Sonatina for viola and piano (1961); Dow Music; American Composers Alliance

- Alexey Verstovsky (1799–1862)

Variations on Two Themes (Вариации на две темы) for viola and piano; transcription by Vadim Borisovsky (1950); Gosudarstvennoe muzykalnoe izdatelstvo (State Music Publishing House)

- Andersen Viana (b. 1962)

Cantilena for viola solo (2003)
Entretenimentos No. 1 for flute and viola (1982)
Entretenimentos No. 2 for viola and string orchestra (1983)
Fantasieta for viola solo (1983)
Fantasieta for viola and piano (1984)
Segunda Neo-Valsa for orchestra of violas (2005)
Três Peças (Three Pieces) for violin and viola (1981)

- László Vidovszky (b. 1944)

The Death of My Viola for viola and chamber ensemble (1996–2004)
The Death of My Viola No. 2 for viola and chamber ensemble (1999)
Lear, Ballet in 1 act for violin and viola (1988)
Machaut-kommentárok (Commentaries on Machaut) for voice and viola (2000)
Tizenkét duó (12 Duos) for violin and viola (1986); Editio Musica Budapest

- Louis Vierne (1870–1937)

Deux Pièces (Two Pieces) for viola or cello and piano, Op. 5 (1894–1895)
1. Le Soir in F major
2. Légende in D minor

- Maurice Vieux (1884–1951)

20 Études for viola solo (1927); Éditions Alphonse Leduc
6 Études de concert for viola and piano (1928–1932); Éditions Alphonse Leduc; Éditions Max Eschig; Associated Music Publishers
10 Études sur des traits d'orchestre for viola solo (1928); Éditions Alphonse Leduc
10 Études sur les intervalles for viola solo (1931); Éditions Alphonse Leduc
Scherzo for viola and piano (1928); Éditions Alphonse Leduc

- Henri Vieuxtemps (1820–1881)

Capriccio "Hommage à Paganini" in C minor for viola solo, Op. 55 (Op. 9 posthumous); published 1883
Duo Brillant in A major for violin, cello (or viola) and orchestra, Op. 39 (1864?)
Élégie in F minor for viola and piano, Op. 30 (1854?)
Étude in C minor for viola and piano; G. Schirmer
Sonata in B♭ major for viola and piano, Op. 36 (1862)
Sonate inachevée (Allegro et Scherzo) in B♭ major for viola and piano, Op. 60 (Op. 14 posthumous); published 1884

- Heitor Villa-Lobos (1887–1959)

Aria (Cantilena) from Bachiana brasileira No. 5 (1938–1945), transcription for viola and piano by William Primrose (1947); Associated Music Publishers
Duo for violin and viola (1946); Music Press

- Edmundo Villani-Côrtes (b. 1930)

Concerto for viola and orchestra
Interlúdio V for viola and piano
Sonata for viola and piano (1969)

- Pierre Villette (1926–1998)

Arabesque for alto saxophone, viola and piano, Op. 55 (1985) or orchestra (1991); Éditions Alphonse Leduc
Aria for violin or viola and piano, Op. 69 (1991)
Barcarolle for viola and piano, Op. 74 (1992); Editions Combre
Boston for viola (or violin) and piano, Op. 73 (1992)
Spleen for viola and piano or chamber orchestra, Op. 63 (1990); Éditions Gérard Billaudot

- Carl Vine (b. 1954)

Miniature I "Peace" for solo viola (1973); Australian Music Centre
Miniature II for 2 violas (1974); Australian Music Centre

- Nicholas Vines (b. 1976)

The Underside Revealed for solo viola and string ensemble (1996); Australian Music Centre

- Giulio Viozzi (1912–1984)

Sonata for viola and piano (1966); Edizioni Suvini Zerboni
Trio for flute, viola and harp (1960); Edizioni Musicali G. Zanibon

- Berthe di Vito-Delvaux (1915–2005)

Sonata for viola and piano, Op. 60 (1955); CeBeDeM

- Jāzeps Vītols (1863–1948)

Récit for viola or cello and piano, Op. 14 (1894); M.P. Belaieff

- Marina Vlad (b. 1949)

Natură moartă V (Still Life V) for viola solo (1999)

- Wladimir Vogel (1896–1984)

Kleine Hörformen for viola and piano, VWV 51 (1979); Hug Musikverlage

- Hans Vogt (1911–1992)

Serenade und Tarantella for viola and chamber ensemble (1986); Bote & Bock
Sonata for viola and harp (1992); Bote & Bock
Trio for flute, viola and harp (1951, 1989)

- Dan Voiculescu (1940–2009);

Ribattuta for viola solo (1976); see also ribattuta

- Johann Georg Hermann Voigt (1769–1811)

Concerto in C major for viola and orchestra, Op. 11 (c.1790)

- Kevin Volans (b. 1949)

viola:piano for viola and piano (2008); Chester Music

- Robert Volkmann (1815–1883)

Romanze in E major for cello (or viola) and piano, Op. 7 (1853); arranged by Friedrich Hermann for viola and piano (1891); Breitkopf & Härtel
Schlummerlied (Lullaby) in A major for viola, cello (or 2 violas) and piano, Op. 76 (1882); Edition Schott; Amadeus-Verlag

- Andrei Volkonsky (1933–2008)

Sonata for viola and piano, Op. 8 (1955); M.P. Belaieff

- Alexander Voormolen (1895–1980)

Sonata for viola and piano (1953); Donemus

- Sláva Vorlová (1894–1973)

Fantasie na lidovou píseň z XV. století (Fantasy on a 15th-Century Czech Folk Song) for viola solo, Op. 33 (1953); Český Hudební Fond
Slovácký koncert (Slovak Concerto) for viola and orchestra, Op. 35 (1954); Český Hudební Fond

- Emil Votoček (1872–1950)

Fantasie for viola and piano (1943)
Tři ballatine (3 Ballatines) for viola and piano (published 1945); Hudební Matice Umělecké Besedy
Suite for viola and piano

- Antonín Vranický (1761–1820)

Cassation in F major for 5 violas or 4 violas and bassoon; Rarities for Strings Publications; Amadeus Verlag
Concerto in C major for 2 violas and orchestra; Friedrich Hofmeister Verlag

- Pavel Vranický (1756–1808)

3 Sonatas (Duos) for violin and viola; Amadeus Verlag

- Aleksandra Vrebalov (b. 1970)

Duo Uran for clarinet and viola (1996)
Souls, Boats Traveling for flute, viola, harp and prerecorded sounds (2012)
Spell No. 7 (after Bach’s Cello Suite No. 5), for viola solo (2016); Composers Edition
Vladimir Trio for flute, violin and viola (1997, revised 2004)

- Victor Vreuls (1876–1944)

Poême in E♭ major for cello (or viola) and orchestra, Op. 3 (1900); version with piano (1904); Éditions de L'Art Belge; Bosworth & Co.

- Klaas de Vries (b. 1944)

Tegen de tijd, Elegie for viola solo (1998); Donemus

- Alexander Vustin (1943–2020)

In Memoriam Grigory Frid for viola and piano (2014)

- Ladislav Vycpálek (1882–1969)

Duo for violin and viola, Op. 20 (1929); Hudební Matice Umělecké Besedy; Český Hudební Fond
Suite for viola solo, Op. 21 (1929); Hudební Matice Umělecké Besedy; Český Hudební Fond

== W ==
- Louis van Waefelghem (1840–1908)

Soir d'automne (Autumn Evening), Melody for viola d'amore or viola and piano or harp (1903)

- Andrew Waggoner (b. 1960)

Collines parmi étoiles... (Hills among Stars...) for viola solo (2003)
Duo for violin and viola (1985); American Composers Alliance
Elle s'enfuit (Encore-Fugue) for viola and piano (2008)
Story-Sonata for viola and piano (1990); American Composers Alliance

- Richard Wagner (1813–1883)

Träume (1857) from Wesendonck Lieder, WWV 91; transcription for viola and piano by William Primrose

- Daniel Waitzman (b. 1943)

Sonata in D minor for viola and piano or harpsichord (2008)

- Stanley Walden (b. 1932)

Fancy 3 for viola and double bass (and large tam-tam) (1977); Musikedition Nymphenburg 2001

- Ernest Walker (1870–1949)

Romance in B♭ for viola (or clarinet) and piano, Op. 9 (1898); Joseph Williams
Sonata in C major for viola and piano, Op. 29 (1897); Edition Schott (published 1912)
Variations on an Original Theme for viola and piano (1907); Novello

- George Walker (1922–2018)

Sonata for viola and piano (1989); MMB Music

- Gwyneth Walker (b. 1947)

Sonata for viola and piano (1982); MMB Music

- Errollyn Wallen (b. 1958)

Five Postcards for violin and viola (2010)
Lavinia for viola solo (2021)
Rapture for viola and piano (1998)
Romeo Turn for viola, cello and double bass (1990); Edition Peters

- Richard Henry Walthew (1872–1951)

A Mosaic in Ten Pieces (with Dedication) for clarinet (or viola) and piano (1900)
Regret and Conversation Galante for viola and piano (1918); Boosey & Hawkes
Serenade-Sonata in F minor for viola and piano (1925); Joseph Williams
Sonata in D for viola and piano (1938); Stainer & Bell
Suite in F for clarinet (or viola) and piano (1899)

- William Walton (1902–1983)

Concerto in A minor for viola and orchestra (1928–1929); Oxford University Press

- Johann Baptist Wanhal (1739–1813)

Concerto in C major for viola and orchestra
Concerto in F major for viola and orchestra (c.1785); original for bassoon and orchestra (c.1780); transcription by the composer; Verlag Doblinger
Sonata in E♭ major for viola and piano; first published in 1973
Sonata in C major for viola and harpsichord, Op. 5 No. 1
Sonata in D major for viola and harpsichord, Op. 5 No. 2
Sonata in F major for viola and harpsichord, Op. 5 No. 3
Sonata in C major for viola and harpsichord, Op. 5 No. 4

- Robert Ward (1917–2013)

Arioso and Tarantelle for viola and piano (1954); Highgate Press, Galaxy Music

- David Ward-Steinman (1936–2015)

Cinnabar for viola and piano (1991); Merion Music; Theodore Presser Company
Cinnabar, Concerto for viola and string orchestra with percussion and piano (or celeste) (1991–1993); Merion Music; Theodore Presser Company

- Harry Waldo Warner (1874–1945)

A Valse Caprice for violin (or viola) and piano, Op. 20 No. 6 (1927); Carl Fischer

- Elinor Remick Warren (1900–1991)

Poem for viola with piano (1932); Carl Fischer

- Rodney Waschka II (b. 1958)

Six Folksongs from an Imaginary Country for viola solo (2003)

- Wilhelm Joseph von Wasielewski (1822–1895)

Notturno in B♭ major for violin (or viola, or cello) and piano, Op. 21 (published 1892)
Herbstblumen (Autumn Flowers) for violin or viola and piano, Op. 30 (published 1892)

- Graham Waterhouse (b. 1962)

Duo for viola and cello (1988)
Karla Duo for violin and viola, or viola and cello (1985); Musikverlag Varner
Sonata ebraica (Hebrew Sonata) for viola and piano (2012–2013)
4 Epigraphe nach Escher (Four Epigraphs after Escher) for viola, heckelphone and piano, Op. 35 (1995); Friedrich Hofmeister Musikverlag

- Huw Watkins (b. 1976)

Double Concerto for viola, cello and orchestra (2004–2005); Edition Schott
Fantasy for viola and piano (2006); Edition Schott
Miniatures for viola and piano (2009); Edition Schott
Speak Seven Seas for clarinet, viola and piano (2011); Edition Schott

- Melia Watras (b. 1969)

Liquid Voices for violin and viola (2013)
Photo by Mikel for viola solo (2012)
Prelude for viola solo (2014)
Sonata for viola solo (2012)

- John Webb (b. 1969)

Here's Fine Rosemary, Sage and Thyme for viola solo (1994); Corda Music Publications
Hop-bodee-boody's Last Will and Testament for soprano, 4 violas and harpsichord (1998); British Music Information Centre
Into His Marvellous Light for choir, solo viola and organ (1997); British Music Information Centre

- Ben Weber (1916–1979)

Chorale and Variations for viola and piano, Op. 18 (1943)
Rhapsodie Concertante for viola and small orchestra, Op. 47 (1957); Mobart Music Publications

- Bedřich Diviš Weber (1766–1842)

6 Duos faciles et récréatifs for viola and piano, Op. 18 (published 1890)

- Carl Maria von Weber (1786–1826)

Andante e Rondo ongarese (Andante and Hungarian Rondo) in C minor for viola and orchestra, Op. 35, J. 79 (1809)
Variationen über das österreichische Volkslied "A Schüsserl und a Reind'rl" (Variations on the Austrian Folk Song "A Schüsserl und a Reind'rl") in C major for viola and orchestra, J. 49 (1806)

- Friedrich Weber (1819–1909)

Six duos faciles et récréatifs (6 Easy and Refreshing Duos) for viola (or cello) and piano, Op. 18 (1888)

- Hieronymus Weickmann (1825–1895)

Fantasie in F major for cello or viola and piano (1884)
Gebet in D♭ major for viola and piano (c.1879)
Nachtlied und Wiegenlied (Nocturne and Lullaby) for viola and piano, Op. 4 (1890)

- Adolf Weidig (1867–1931)

Kleines Trio (Little Trio) in D minor for violin, viola and piano, Op. 9 (1893)

- Karl Weigl (1881–1949)

Sonata in B♭ major for viola and piano, Op. 38 (1939); John Markert & Co.; American Composers Alliance

- Vally Weigl (1894–1982)

Black Arch of the Night for voice and clarinet or viola (1979); American Composers Alliance
Enigma for flute, viola and harp (or piano) (1979); American Composers Alliance
Hoffnungsschimmer (Glimpse of Hope) for alto or baritone, viola and piano (1937); American Composers Alliance
How Many Nights for voice, viola and piano (1975); American Composers Alliance
Nightfall in the Mountains for voice, viola (or violin) and piano (1975); American Composers Alliance
Old Time Burlesque for cello (or viola) and piano (1952); American Composers Alliance
Playthings of the Wind for baritone, mezzo-soprano, clarinet or viola and piano (1978); words by Carl Sandburg
Prelude for Three for flute, viola and harp
Regennacht (Rain at Night) for alto or baritone, viola and piano (1972); words by Hermann Hesse; American Composers Alliance
Songs from "No Boundary" for voice, violin or viola and piano (1963); words by Lenore Marshall; American Composers Alliance
Three Dialogues for flute (or violin) and viola (or clarinet) (1979–1980); American Composers Alliance
Trialogues for flute, viola and harp (or piano, or harpsichord) (1978); American Composers Alliance

- Ernest Weiller (1863–1944)

Au pied de la croix, Adagio for violin, or viola, or cello and piano (1926); Éditions Durand
Largo for violin, or viola, or cello and piano; Edition Combre
Malagueña: Danse espagnole for violin or viola, string orchestra (or piano) and castanets; Enoch & Cie.; Éditions Durand
Prière for viola and piano, Op. 280; Enoch & Cie.
Rêve for violin or viola and piano; Enoch & Cie.; Éditions Durand
Sicilienne for violin, or viola, or cello and piano, Op. 307; Edition Combre
Souffrance: Mélodie for violin, or viola, or cello and piano (or string quintet); Enoch & Cie.; Éditions Durand

- Mieczysław Weinberg (1919–1996)

Sonata for clarinet (or viola) and piano, Op. 28 (1945); Peermusic Classical
Sonata No. 1 for viola solo, Op. 107 (1971); Peermusic Classical
Sonata No. 2 for viola solo, Op. 123 (1978); Peermusic Classical
Sonata No. 3 for viola solo, Op. 135 (1982); Peermusic Classical
Sonata No. 4 for viola solo, Op. 136 (1983); Peermusic Classical
Trio for flute, viola and harp (or piano), Op. 127 (1979); Peermusic Classical

- László Weiner (1916–1944)

Concerto for flute, viola, piano and string orchestra (1941?); Zeneműkiadó Vállalat; Editio Musica Budapest
Duo for violin and viola (1939); Zeneműkiadó Vállalat; Editio Musica Budapest
Sonata for viola and piano (1939?); Zeneműkiadó Vállalat; Editio Musica Budapest

- Leó Weiner (1885–1960)

Ballade in B♭ minor for clarinet (or viola) and piano, Op. 8 (1911); Rózsavölgyi & Co.; Masters Music Publications
Peregi verbunk (Recruiting Dance from Pereg), Hungarian Dance for clarinet (or violin, or viola) and piano, Op. 40 (1951); Editio Musica Budapest

- Justus Weinreich (1858–1927)

Serenade in D major for violin and viola (1918)
3 Duets for 2 violas, Op. 5 (1901)
3 Suites for viola solo (1894); Amadeus Verlag

- John Weinzweig (1913–2006)

Belaria for viola solo (1992); Canadian Music Centre
Tremologue for viola solo (1987); Canadian Music Centre

- Judith Weir (b. 1954)

The Alps for soprano, clarinet and viola (1992); words by Emily Dickinson; Chester Music
St. Agnes for viola and cello (2006); Chester Music

- Arthur Weisberg (1931–2009)

Birthday Piece for viola and bassoon (1991)
Piece for viola solo (1984); American Composers Alliance

- Elliot Weisgarber (1919–2001)

Concerto for viola and string orchestra (1957); Canadian Music Centre

- Julius Weismann (1879–1950)

Kammermusik (Chamber Music) for flute, viola and piano, Op. 86 (published 1952); Süddeutscher Musikverlag
Kammermusik (Chamber Music) for viola and piano, Op. 88 (1936); Edition Gravis
Sonata for viola solo, Op. 149 (1945); Edition Gravis
Thema, Variationen und Gigue (Theme, Variations and Gigue) for viola and piano, Op. 146 (1943); Edition Gravis

- Adolph Weiss (1891–1971)

Ode to the West Wind for baritone, viola and piano (1945); Composers Facsimile Edition; American Composers Alliance
Passacaglia for horn and viola (1942); Composers Facsimile Edition; American Composers Alliance
Sonata da Camera for flute and viola (1930); New Music Edition; American Music Center
Trio for clarinet, viola and cello (1948); Composers Facsimile Edition; American Composers Alliance

- Manfred Weiss (b. 1935)

5 Expressionen for viola and piano (1996)
Memento for viola solo (2002)
4 Miniaturen for viola and double bass (2006); Bellmann Musikverlag
10 Papillons for viola solo (2011); Bellmann Musikverlag

- Egon Wellesz (1885–1974)

Präludium (Prelude) for viola solo, Op. 112 (1971); Ludwig Doblinger
Rhapsody for viola solo, Op. 87 (1959, 1962); Ludwig Doblinger

- Marcel Wengler (b. 1946)

Concerto for viola and orchestra (1997)

- Felix Werder (1922–2012)

Fractured Fancies for viola, piano and percussion (1984); Australian Music Centre
Kabbalah for viola solo (1981); Australian Music Centre
Out of Voronezh for viola and guitar (1994); Australian Music Centre
Psalm for viola and piano, Op. 14 (1954); Australian Music Centre
Renunciation for viola, percussion and orchestra (1987); Australian Music Centre

- Eberhard Werdin (1911–1991)

5 Bratschen-Duette (5 Viola Duets) for 2 violas (1988); Verlag Doblinger
Divertimento for viola solo (1979); Möseler Verlag
Divertimento for alto recorder and viola (1986); Verlag Doblinger
Duo for viola and cello, Op. 126 (1984); Verlag Doblinger
Greensleeves-Variationen for viola and piano (1984); Verlag Doblinger
Senioren-Duo for violin and viola, Op. 77 (1987); Verlag Doblinger
Serenata Concertante for viola and string orchestra; Möseler Verlag
Sonatine No. 2 for viola and piano (1981); Möseler Verlag
Vier Bagatellen (4 Bagatelles) for viola and guitar (1984); Verlag Doblinger

- Richard Wernick (b. 1934)

Cadenzas and Variations I for viola and piano (1967); Theodore Presser Company
Concerto "Do Not Go Gentle" for viola and orchestra (1986); Theodore Presser Company

- Martin Wesley-Smith (1945–2019)

Doublets 2 for viola, live electronics and tape (1987); Australian Music Centre

- Johannes Weyrauch (1897–1977)

Herzliebster Jesu, was hast du verbrochen (Alas, Dear Lord, What Law Then Hast Thou Broken), Sonata for viola and organ (1932); Hänssler

- Paul W. Whear (1925–2021)

Sonata "The Briefcase" for viola and piano (1981); Ludwig Music

- Graham Whettam (1927–2007)

Ballade hébraïque for viola and orchestra (1999); Meriden Music
Concerto for viola and orchestra, Op. 16 (1954); de Wolfe
Romanza [No. 1] for viola solo (1993); Meriden Music
Romanza No. 2 for viola solo (2000); Meriden Music
Serenade for viola (or clarinet) and guitar (1981); Meriden Music

- James Whitbourn (b. 1963)

The Canticles of Mary and Simeon: Magnificat and Nunc Dimittis (Eboracum) for mixed chorus, viola and organ (2011); Chester Music
Luminosity, Cantata-Meditation for double mixed chorus, viola, tanpura, tam-tam and organ (2007); Chester Music

- John White (b. 1936)

Incantation for viola solo (1987); Oxford University Press; British Music Information Centre

- Gillian Whitehead (b. 1941)

Haiku for soprano, viola and piano (1995); Australian Music Centre; Centre for New Zealand Music
Lament for baritone, oboe and viola (1964)
Moonstone for viola and piano (1976); Price Milburn Music; Centre for New Zealand Music
Ricercare for viola solo (1976); Price Milburn Music; Centre for New Zealand Music
These Isles Your Dream for mezzo-soprano, viola and piano (1983); Australian Music Centre; Centre for New Zealand Music

- Matthew Whiteside (b. 1988)

Ulation for viola and live electronics (2012); Contemporary Music Centre Ireland

- Kate Whitley (b.1989)

Concerto for viola and orchestra (2010)

- William G. Whittaker (1876–1944)

Suite for viola and piano (1932); Scottish Music Centre

- Charles Whittenberg (1927–1984)

Set for Two, Divertimento for viola and piano (1962)

- Ian Whyte (1901–1961)

Air for viola and string orchestra; Scottish Music Centre
Highland Melody "Och Is Ochan Mo Charamh Mar Dheirich Do Thearlach" for viola and string orchestra; Scottish Music Centre
Sweet Allander Stream, Poem for small orchestra with soli violas (1955?); Scottish Music Centre

- Paul Wiancko (b. 1983)

American Haiku, Duo for viola and cello (2015)
Sonata for viola and piano (2016)

- Jörg Widmann (b. 1973)

Concert for viola and orchestra (2015); Schott Music

- Charles-Marie Widor (1844–1937)

Andante from the Organ Symphony No. 8 for viola d'amore or viola and piano, Op. 42 No. 4 (1887); transcription by Louis van Waefelghem (1895?)

- Jean Wiener (1896–1982)

Riz et jeux: divertissement impur sur un thème pur (Rice and Games) for viola and piano (1947); Éditions Choudens

- Henryk Wieniawski (1835–1880)

Rêverie in F♯ minor for viola and piano (1855, published 1885)

- Philip Wilby (b. 1949)

Parables for viola and piano (1988); Chester Music

- Jacques Wildberger (1922–2006)

Diaphanie: Fantasia super "Veni creator spiritus" et Canones diversi super "Nun bitten wir den Heiligen Geist" for viola solo (1986); Hug Musikverlage
Notturno for viola and piano (1–2 little Japanese temple bells ad libitum) (1990); Hug Musikverlage

- Alec Wilder (1907–1980)

Sonata for viola and piano (1965)

- Margaret Lucy Wilkins (b. 1939)

Suite for Two for violin and viola (1968); Scottish Music Centre

- Christopher Willcock (b. 1947)

The Frilled Lizard for viola and harp (published 1999); Australian Music Centre

- Edgar Warren Williams (b. 1949)

Amoretti for viola and piano (1980); Mobart Music

- Gareth Williams (b. 1977)

Black Marks on White Paper for viola and piano 4-hands (2007); Contemporary Music Centre Ireland

- John Williams (b. 1932)

Concerto for viola and orchestra (2009); Hal Leonard
Duo Concertante for violin and viola (2007); Hal Leonard

- John McLaughlin Williams (b. 1957)

2 Pieces for viola solo

- Malcolm Williamson (1931–2003)

Partita on Themes of Walton for viola solo (1972); Oxford University Press; Joseph Weinberger

- George Balch Wilson (1927–2021)

Sonata for viola and piano (1952); Éditions Jobert

- Ian Wilson (b. 1964)

Apparitions for viola (or alto flute) and percussion ensemble (2005); G. Ricordi London
Četiri kamena (Four Stones) for viola, bass clarinet and accordion (2010); Contemporary Music Centre Ireland
Mürrische Erde for viola solo (2009); Contemporary Music Centre Ireland
Spilliaert's Beach for viola and piano (1999); original for alto flute and piano; Universal Edition
red over black for clarinet, viola and piano (2004); G. Ricordi London

- James Wilson (1922–2005)

Capriccio for viola solo (2001); Ireland Contemporary Music Centre
The Christmas Rose for voice and viola (1989); Ireland Contemporary Music Centre
Concerto ‘For Sarajevo’, Triple Concerto for violin, viola, cello and orchestra, Op. 143 (1996, revised 1998); Ireland Contemporary Music Centre
Consequences for flute, viola and harp, Op. 169 (2004); Ireland Contemporary Music Centre
Menorah for viola and orchestra, Op. 123 (1989); Ireland Contemporary Music Centre
Shadow Play for viola solo, Op. 115a (1988); Ireland Contemporary Music Centre
Wildwood for soprano and viola, Op. 124 (1990); Ireland Contemporary Music Centre

- Olly Wilson (1937–2018)

Concerto for viola and orchestra (1992); G. Schirmer

- Richard Wilson (b. 1941)

Music for Solo Viola (1988); Peermusic
Peregrinations for viola and orchestra (2003); Peermusic
Sonata for viola and piano (1989); Peermusic

- Stanley Wilson (1899–1953)

Double Concerto for violin, viola and orchestra (1935)
2 Pieces for viola and piano

- Thomas Wilson (1927–2001)

Concerto for viola and orchestra (1987); Queensgate Music

- Andrew Wilson-Dickson (b. 1946)

digital sonata for viola and digital piano (2004–2005)
Sonatine Gaillacoise for clarinet and viola

- Lothar Windsperger (1885–1935)

Ode in C minor for viola solo, Op. 13 No. 2 (1919); Edition Schott
Sonata for viola solo, Op. 42 (1930); Edition Schott

- Alexander Winkler (1865–1935)

Sonata in C minor for viola and piano, Op. 10 (1902)
Deux Morceaux (2 Pieces) for viola and piano, Op. 31 (1933)

- Peter Wishart (1921–1984)

Cassation for violin and viola (1949); Oxford University Press
Musica No. 8 for viola solo (2006)
Sonate Musica for saxophone, viola and piano (1996–1997)

- René Wohlhauser (b. 1954)

CI – IC for flute and viola, Ergon 11 (1985); Édition Musicale Suisse
Quantenströmung (Quantum Current) for flute, viola and harp, Ergon 23 (1996); Édition Musicale Suisse

- Ernst Wilhelm Wolf (1735–1792)

Concerto in B♭ major for viola and orchestra; Edition Dohr
Concerto in F major for viola and orchestra

- Christian Wolff (b. 1934)

Emma for viola, cello and piano (1988–1989); C.F. Peters
Malvina for 2 violas (1992); C.F. Peters
She Had Some Horses for zither and viola (2001)
Three Pieces for violin and viola (1979–1980); C.F. Peters
Violist Pieces for viola solo (1997); C.F. Peters
Violist and Percussionist for viola and percussion (1996); C.F. Peters

- Félicien Wolff (1913–2012)

Trio for viola (or violin), cello and piano (1945); Éditions Delatour

- Stefan Wolpe (1902–1972)

Drei kleinere Kanons (3 Little Canons) for viola and cello, Op. 24a (1936); Peer Music
Piece for Viola Alone, C. 165 (1966); original work for violin; Josef Marx Music Company

- Reinhard Wolschina (1952–2025)

Canto appassionato for viola and piano (1976); Keturi Musikverlag
Klangspiele II for viola and 14 instruments (1989); Breitkopf & Härtel

- William Wolstenholme (1865–1931)

Allegretto in E♭ major, Op. 17 No. 2; arrangement for viola and piano by Lionel Tertis (published 1900); Comus Edition
Canzona in B♭ major, Op. 12 No. 1 (1893); arrangement for viola and piano by Lionel Tertis; Corda Music Publications
Die Antwort (The Answer), Op. 13 No. 2; arrangement for viola and piano by Lionel Tertis; Comus Edition
Die Frage (The Question), Op. 13 No. 1; arrangement for viola and piano by Lionel Tertis; Comus Edition
Romanza, Op. 17 No. 1; arrangement for viola and piano by Lionel Tertis (published 1900); Comus Edition

- Hugh Wood (1932–2021)

Michael Berkeley Tribute for viola solo (2004); Chester Music
Trio for flute, viola and piano, Op. 3 (1961); Universal Edition; Chester Music
Variations for viola and piano, Op. 1 (1958); Chester Music

- Joseph Wood (1915–2000)

Double Concerto for viola and piano with Orchestra (1970); American Composers Alliance
Sonata for viola and piano (1938); American Composers Alliance

- John Woolrich (b. 1954)

Concerto for viola and orchestra (1993); Faber Music
Envoi for viola and small ensemble (1997); Faber Music
Three Pieces for viola solo (1993); Faber Music
Through a Limbeck for viola solo (2002); Faber Music
To the Silver Bow, Double Concerto for viola, double bass and string orchestra (2014); Faber Music
Ulysses Awakes for viola and 10 solo strings (1989); Faber Music

- William Wordsworth (1908–1988)

Conversation Piece for viola and guitar, Op. 113 (1983); Speyside Music Publications
Four Songs of Shakespeare for high voice, viola and piano, Op. 103 (1977); Scottish Music Centre
Intermezzo for viola and piano (1935); Scottish Music Centre
The Solitary Reaper for mixed chorus, viola and piano; Scottish Music Centre
Sonatina in D for viola and piano (or Guitar), Op. 71 (1961); Scottish Music Centre
Three Pieces for viola and piano, Op. 93 (1972); Scottish Music Centre
1. Prelude
2. Elegy
3. Scherzo

- Alexander Wunderer (1877–1955)

Sonata for viola and piano, Op. 21 (1946); Verlag Doblinger

- Charles Wuorinen (1938–2020)

Viola Variations for viola solo (2008); Edition Peters

- Ruth Shaw Wylie (1916–1989)

Sonata [No. 1] for viola and piano, Op. 16 No. 3 (1954)

- Yehudi Wyner (b. 1929)

Composition for viola and piano (1987); Associated Music Publishers

- David Wynne (1900–1983)

Fantasia Concerto for viola and orchestra (1961); Welsh Music Information Centre
Sonata for viola and piano (1951)
Sonatina for viola and piano (1946); Welsh Music Information Centre

- Ivan Wyschnegradsky (1893–1979)

Sonata in One Movement for viola and 2 pianos tuned a quarter-tone apart, Op. 34 (1945–1959)

== X ==
- Iannis Xenakis (1922–2001)

Embellie for viola solo (1981); Éditions Salabert

- Yi Xu – 徐仪 (b. 1963)

Miroir / Poussière for viola and 9 instruments (1992); Éditions Musicales Transatlantiques
Qing for viola solo (2009); Éditions Henry Lemoine

== Y ==
- Hiroyuki Yamamoto (b. 1967)

Textile Texts (テクスタイル・テクスツ) for clarinet and viola (2001)

- James Yannatos (1929–2011)

Fantasy for viola and piano (1960); Sonory Publications
Madrigals for flute (or violin) and viola (1981); Sonory Publications

- Akio Yasuraoka (b. 1958)

Offrande (オフランド, Offering) for viola solo (1990); Japan Federation of Composers
Polyphonia (ポリフォニア, Porifonia) for viola and orchestra (1995–1996)

- Boris Yoffe (b. 1968)

Gedicht (Poem) for viola solo
Speech for clarinet, viola and piano
Symbol for violin and viola

- Rolv Yttrehus (1926–2018)

Music for Winds, Percussion, and Viola (1961); Mobart Music; American Composers Alliance

- Joji Yuasa (b. 1929)

Revealed Time (啓かれた時) for viola and orchestra (1986); Schott Japan
Viola Locus (ヴィオラ・ローカス) for viola solo (1995); Schott Japan

- Sergei Yuferov (1865–?)

Mélancolie in D minor for viola and orchestra, Op. 43 No. 2 (1910)

- Isang Yun (1917–1995)

Contemplation for 2 violas (1988); initial title: Stille am See; Bote & Bock
Duo for viola and piano (1976); Bote & Bock

- Benjamin Yusupov (b. 1962)

Concerto for viola and orchestra (2003); Hans Sikorski; G. Schirmer
Vocal Cycle by Japanese Poets for voice, viola and piano (1985); Israeli Music Center
But in Vain for flute, viola and harp, Op. 44 (1997); Hans Sikorski
Fantasy for viola solo, Op. 16 (1988)
Kasida on Mourning for viola, piano and celesta, Op. 4 (1982)
Maximum for violin, viola, flute, harp and orchestra (2003); Hans Sikorski; G. Schirmer

- Carlo Yvon (1798–1854)

Sonata in F for English horn or viola and piano (1831)

== Z ==
- Mario Zafred (1922–1987)

Concerto for viola and orchestra (1957); Ricordi
Elegia in tre tempi for viola and orchestra (1965); Ricordi
Invenzioni for violin, viola and orchestra (1966); Ricordi
Sonata in tre tempi for viola solo (1970); Ricordi

- Judith Lang Zaimont (b. 1945)

Astral – A Mirror Life on the Astral Plane for viola solo (2004); Jeanné Music Publications
Music for Two for 2 violas (1971); Jeanné Music Publications

- Joaquim Zamacois (1894–1976)

Serenada d'hivern for viola and piano (1970); Unión Musical Española

- Gheorghe Zamfir (b. 1941)

Amintiri din copilărie (Memories of Childhood) for pan flute and viola (1988)

- Edson Zampronha (b. 1963)

Perfurando a Linha (Drilling the Line) for viola solo (2002)

- Daniele Zanettovich (b. 1950)

Cancion antigua for flute, viola (or cello) and harp (2003); Pizzicato Verlag Helvetia
Sei canzoni andaluse (6 Andalusian Songs) for flute, viola (or cello) and harp (1994, 1997, 2003); Pizzicato Verlag Helvetia
Stabat Mater for mezzo-soprano, male chorus, viola and orchestra (or organ) (2002); Pizzicato Verlag Helvetia
Vivaldiana for flute, viola and harp (2004); Pizzicato Verlag Helvetia

- Luigi Zaninelli (b. 1932)

Two Movements for Unaccompanied Viola/Violin for One Player (1986); Shawnee Press

- Davide Zannoni (b. 1958)

Boom Box Rondo for viola and piano (1991)

- Julien-François Zbinden (1917–2021)

Alternances for flute, viola and harp, Op. 88 (1997); Editions BIM
Poème for viola and string orchestra, Op. 84 (1993–1994); Editions BIM
Solissimo II for viola solo, Op. 102 (2005); Editions BIM

- Ruth Zechlin (1926–2007)

In Memorian Witold Lutosławski for viola solo (1995); Ries & Erler Musikverlag

- Oded Zehavi (b. 1961)

Concerto for viola and orchestra (1994); Israel Music Institute
Grace (Khesed) for viola and piano (2004)

- Friedrich Zehm (1923–2007)

Albumblatt (Album Leaf) for viola and piano (1980)
Drei Elegien (Three Elegies) for viola and piano (1987); Edition Schott
Duo for violin and viola (1954)
6 Impromptus for clarinet in A and viola (1987–1988); Edition Ebenos
Präludium for viola solo (1954)
Sonata for viola and piano (1949)

- Eric Zeisl (1905–1959)

Arrowhead, Trio for flute, viola and harp (1956); Doblinger Verlag
Sonata in A minor for viola and piano (1950); Doblinger Verlag

- Ilja Zeljenka (1932–2007)

Concerto for viola and wind orchestra
Sonáta-balada for viola and piano (1988)
Sonáta-elégia for viola solo (2000)
Sonatína for viola and piano
Tri kusy (3 Pieces) for viola solo (1985)

- Carl Friedrich Zelter (1758–1832)

Concerto in E♭ major for viola and orchestra (1779)

- Hans Zender (1936–2019)

Hölderlin lesen II for sprechstimme, viola and live electronics (1987); words by Friedrich Hölderlin; Breitkopf & Härtel
3 Rondels nach Mallarmé (3 Rondels after Mallarmé) for alto, flute and viola (1966); words by Stéphane Mallarmé; Bote & Bock

- Zhou Long (b. 1953)

Wild Grass for viola solo (1993); Oxford University Press

- Gaziza Zhubanova (1927–1993)

Melody (Мелодия) in C♯ minor for viola and piano (1950); Sovetsky Kompozitor

- Alexander Zhurbin – Александр Борисович Журбин (b. 1945)

Concerto in Three Movements for viola and orchestra, Op. 31 (1974)
Sonata for viola and piano, Op. 8
Три Музы (Three Muses), 3 Pieces for viola, double bass and harpsichord, Op. 46

- Lev Zhurbin (b. 1978)

25 for viola and piano (2003)
Dolcissimo for viola and piano (1999)
Duet for violin and viola (1995)
Elegia for cello or viola and piano (1995)
Four for 4 violas (2004)
Intermezzo Sentimentale for 1 (or 2) violins and viola (2003)
Kleine Fantasie (Preludia VI) for viola solo (1996)
Lamentation for 2 cellos or 2 violas (2010)
N. Maladie for viola and piano (2005)
No Satisfying Ending for viola and piano (2002)
Preludia II for viola solo (1994)
Red Wagon Rag for viola and piano (2002)
Red Wagon Waltz for viola and piano (2002)
Romance Funèbre for 2 violas, or violin and viola (2000)
Shadow and Light for viola and percussion (2012–2013)
Sugar Hill Bump for 2 violin, viola and string orchestra (2010)
Three Pieces for viola solo (1997)
The Vjola Suite for multiple violas (2005–2008)

- Otakar Zich (1879–1934)

Elegie for viola and piano (1905)

- Lidia Zielińska (b. 1953)

Glossa for violin or viola solo (1986); Brevis, Poznań

- Grete von Zieritz (1899–2001)

Kaleidoskop, Duo for violin and viola, Op. 127 (1969); Astoria Verlag
Sonata for viola and piano, Op. 67 (1939)
Suite for viola solo, Op. 141 (1976); Astoria Verlag

- Marilyn J. Ziffrin (1926–2018)

Concerto for viola and woodwind quintet (1977–1978)
Haiku, Song Cycle for soprano, viola and harpsichord (or piano) (1971); words by Kathryn Martin; Frank E. Warren Music
Tributum for clarinet, viola and double bass (1992)

- Efrem Zimbalist (1890–1985)

Sarasateana: Suite of Spanish Dances for viola and piano; 1950s transcription of 4 works by Pablo de Sarasate; original for violin and piano; Alpheus Music; G. Schirmer (The Virtuoso Violist)

- Patrick Zimmerli (b. 1968)

The Call for viola solo and chamber ensemble (or piano) (2005–2006)
Spectres for viola solo (2008)
Trio for flute, viola and harp (2009)

- Bernd Alois Zimmermann (1918–1970)

Antiphonen for viola and small orchestra (1961); Edition Modern
Sonata for viola solo (1955); Edition Schott

- Heinz Werner Zimmermann (1930–2022)

Concerto for viola and orchestra (1980–1986; revised 2006); Edition Gravis

- Fidelis Zitterbart (1845–1915)

Aeolian Messengers, 5 Morceaus de salon for viola and piano (1906)
Barcarolle in A minor for viola and piano
Barcarolle in C minor for viola and piano (1906)
Barcarolle in D minor for viola and piano
Barcarolle in G minor for viola and piano (1896); J. Church
Barcarolle in G minor for viola and piano (1906)
Barcarolle No. 2 in G minor for viola and piano
Barcarolle No. 3 in A minor for viola and piano
Barcarolle Pathetique in A♭ major for viola and piano
Barcarolle Sentimentale in D minor for viola and piano (1906)
Ben Hur (Originale nach Jüdischen Character) in A minor for viola and piano
Berceuse, Salonstück in F major for viola and piano
Cavatine in C major for viola and piano
Evening Reverie in F♯ major for viola and piano
Hirtengesang in F major for viola and piano
Idylle in A♭ major for viola and piano (1894)
Imogen for violin or viola and piano (published 1937); Edward Schuberth
Introduction et Romanza Appassionato in D major for viola and piano (1905)
Juliet for violin or viola and piano (published 1937); Edward Schuberth
Lied ohne Worte (Song without Words) for viola and piano (1896); J. Church
The Lighthouse, Salonstück in D minor for viola and piano
Morceaus de Salon (The Voice of a Spring; James' Whistle) for viola and piano (1912)
Murmering Waves, Morceau de Salon in E♭ major for viola and piano (1906)
Pastoral Meditation in F major for viola and piano
Reverie Melancolique in A minor for viola and piano (1903)
Romance in E♭ major for viola and piano (1905)
Romanza "La Viol d'amour" in D♭ major for viola and piano (1894)
Scherzo in F minor for viola and piano
Serenade ("Italian") in B♭ minor for viola and piano (1903)
Sonata "Die 300 Jährige" in F major (in 2 movements) for viola and piano (1886); also titled Sonate in F dur No. 2, in 2 Sätzen
Sonata No. 1 in A minor for viola and piano (1875)
Sonata No. 2 in G minor for viola and piano (1897); American Viola Society Publications
Sonata No. 3 in A minor for viola and piano (1900)
Sonata No. 4 "The Gladiator" in C minor for viola and piano (1903)
Sonata No. 5 in C minor for viola and piano (1904)
Sonata No. 6 in E minor for viola and piano (1904)
Sonata No. 7 in D minor for viola and piano (1905)
Sonata No. 8 "Panoramic" in E♭ major for viola (or violin) and piano (1905)
Sonata No. 9 in A minor for viola and piano (1905)
Sonata No. 11 in C major for viola and piano (1905)
Sonata No. 12 in B minor for viola and piano (1906)
Sonata [No. 13] in A♭ major for viola and piano (1910)
Spanish Serenade for viola and piano (1896); J. Church
Suite in C major for viola and piano (1911)
Swansong in G major for viola and piano (1906)
The Vision of the Spring, Morceau de Salon in E♭ major for viola and piano (1906)

- Đuro Živković (b. 1975)

Le Cimetière Marin II (The Sea Graveyards II) for viola and chamber ensemble (2009); Edition Octoechos
Two Sad Songs for soprano, viola and piano (1998)

- Vasily Zolotarev (1872–1964)

Eclogue (Эклога) in A minor for viola and piano, Op. 38 (1921); Gosudarstvennoe muzykalnoe izdatelstvo (State Music Publishing House)

- Moshe Zorman (b. 1952)

5 Pieces (חמישה קטעים) for violin and viola (1982)

- Juan Carlos Zorzi (1935–1999)

Adagio for viola and orchestra
Concerto for viola and string orchestra (1979)

- León Zuckert (1904–1992)

Short Suite for viola and piano (1974); Canadian Music Centre
Sisterly Love, Duos for violin and viola (1963); Canadian Music Centre
Sonata for unaccompanied viola (1984); Canadian Music Centre
Song in Brass for voice, solo viola, brass, timpani and percussion (1964); Canadian Music Centre
Tristeza pastoril (Shepherd's Sadness) for viola and harp (1970); Canadian Music Centre
