= Black Madonna (disambiguation) =

Black Madonna is a term used for statues or paintings of the Blessed Virgin Mary in which she is depicted with dark skin

Black Madonna may also refer to:

== Religious symbolism ==
- Black Madonna of Częstochowa
- Black Madonna Shrine, Missouri
- House of the Black Madonna in Prague, Czech Republic

== People ==
- The Blessed Madonna, a disc jockey that formerly used the stage name Black Madonna
- Black Madonna, a moniker given to artists such as Rihanna and Lil' Kim

== Arts ==
- Black Madonna (album), a 2007 album by the Austerity Program
- "Black Madonna" (song), a song by Azealia Banks featuring Lex Luger
- "Black Madonna", a song by Cage the Elephant from the album Social Cues
- Black Madonna (novel), a novel by Carl Sargent and Marc Gascoigne
