= Terranova (surname) =

Terranova is an Italian surname, and may refer to:

- Cesare Terranova, a magistrate and politician from Sicily
- Ciro Terranova, a New York City gangster
- Daniela Terranova, Italian composer in the area of concert music and opera
- Elaine Terranova, an American poet
- Emanuele Terranova, an Italian football player
- Josephine Terranova, American defendant in a murder trial
- Mike Terranova, an Italian football player
- Nadia Terranova, an Italian novelist
- Nicholas Terranova, a New York City gangster
- Orlando Terranova (born 1979), Argentinian rally driver
- Osvaldo Terranova, an Argentine film actor
- Phil Terranova, a boxer
- Vincenzo Terranova, a New York City gangster
- Tiziana Terranova, an Italian theorist and activist
- Vincent Michael "Vinnie" Terranova, fictional character and protagonist in the 1987-1990 CBS TV series Wiseguy; portrayed by Ken Wahl

== See also ==
- Terra Nova (disambiguation)
