= Beyond Calculation =

Studio album by The Austerity Program
- Released: June 17, 2014
- Recorded: November 2013, Kerguelen Studio
- Genres: Noise rock, post-hardcore, post-metal, industrial rock
- Length: 38:13
- Label: Controlled Burn Records
- Producer: The Austerity Program

The Austerity Program chronology
Backsliders and Apostates Will Burn (2010)	Beyond Calculation (2014)

Alternate cover
- Cover to vinyl version

Professional ratings
Review scores
Source	Rating
Tiny Mix Tapes	4.5/5 stars
Sputnikmusic	4/5 stars
Beat.com.au	positive
Keep It Fast	positive
Invisible Oranges	positive

Beyond Calculation is the second studio album by noise rock duo The Austerity Program, released in 2014 through their very own Controlled Burn Records. Upon its initial release, the album received warm reception among music critics and was ranked twelfth on Rolling Stone's 20 Best Metal Albums of 2014.

== History ==
In 2012, Hydra Head Records, the band's former label, announced that they had to drop some artists from their label due to financial reasons, thus causing the band to leave the label. Hydra Head would subsequently fold and stop producing music later that year. After leaving Hydra Head, the band decided to create their own Independent record label, which they titled Controlled Burn Records. The album was recorded during November 2013 at Kerguelen Studio, a recording studio the band built.

== Track listing ==
No.	Title	Length
1.	"Song 31"	2:18
2.	"Song 30"	3:50
3.	"Song 39"	3:55
4.	"Song 33"	6:46
5.	"Song 32"	5:32
6.	"Song 35"	4:23
7.	"Song 36"	5:36
8.	"Song 37"	5:56

== Personnel ==
=== Performers ===
- Thad Calabrese - Bass
- Justin Foley - Guitar, Vocals
- Drum machine - Percussion

=== Production ===
- The Austerity Program - Music, Recording
- John Golden - Mastering
