= Backsliders and Apostates Will Burn =

EP by The Austerity Program
- Released: May 4, 2010
- Recorded: September – November 2009, Kerguelen Studio (Astoria, NY)
- Genre: Noise rock, post-metal, industrial rock
- Length: 19:58
- Label: Hydra Head Records
- Producer: The Austerity Program

The Austerity Program chronology
Black Madonna (2007)	Backsliders and Apostates Will Burn (2010)	Beyond Calculation (2014)

Professional ratings
Review scores
Source	Rating
Absolutepunk.net	6.4/10
10listens.com	positive
PopMatters	3/10 stars

Backsliders and Apostates Will Burn is the second EP by American noise rock band The Austerity Program, released in 2010 through Hydra Head Records through vinyl, compact disc, and even Data DVD-R formats. For marketing, instead of making usual press kits, the band decided to use humorous ways to market the release of the record, such as writing a fake review written by an angry staff member of Hydra Head.

== Marketing ==
As a joke, the duo wrote a fake review for the album that is supposed to sound as if it was written by an irate staff member of Hydra Head Records complaining about the lack of material found of the EP. The "review" was posted on the EP's bandcamp and Amazon.com page:

What does it sound like? You tell us, man. We haven't even cracked open the reference copies because what's the point? If it's anything like their last record (and they claim that it is, but "so much better" -- whatever, guys) it'll have a drum machine and some guitars and bass and that one guy will be singing and can I just tell you how mad I am that I am even stuck writing this thing?

The band also released a short film to help market the record. In it, the band hires a "professional producer" to help them record the record, only for him to kick the band out of the project and to completely ruin it.

== Track listing ==
No.	Title	Length
1.	"Song 25"	4:42
2.	"Song 26"	5:18
3.	"Song 27"	4:05
4.	"Song 29"	5:31

== Personnel ==
=== Performers ===
- Thad Calabrese - Bass
- Justin Foley - Guitar, Vocals
- Drum machine - everything else

=== Production ===
- John Golden - Mastering
- The Austerity Program - Music, Recording
