= Newfoundland (disambiguation) =

Newfoundland is an island in North America and part of the province of Newfoundland and Labrador.

Newfoundland may also refer to:

== Places ==
=== Canada ===
- Three islands in the current province of Newfoundland and Labrador share this name:
  - Newfoundland (island), the main island
  - Newfoundland Island, Labrador, off the coast of Labrador
  - Ukasiksalik Island, in Davis Inlet, Labrador, also known as Newfoundland Island
- As a political entity:
  - Newfoundland Colony, an English and later British colony from 1583 to 1907
  - Dominion of Newfoundland, a self-governing dominion of the British Empire from 1907 to 1949
  - A province of Canada, known as Newfoundland from 1949 to 2001; see 1948 Newfoundland referendums
  - Newfoundland and Labrador, the province's name since 2001

=== United Kingdom ===
- Newfoundland, London, a residential skyscraper development opened in 2021

=== United States ===
- Newfoundland, Kentucky
- Newfoundland, New Jersey
  - Newfoundland station (New York, Susquehanna and Western Railroad)
- Newfoundland, Pennsylvania
- Newfoundland Mountains, of Utah, in the Great Salt Lake Desert

== Transportation ==
- HMS Newfoundland (59), a Royal Navy cruiser
- HMHS Newfoundland, a British Royal Mail Ship that became a hospital ship in the Second World War and was sunk in the Mediterranean
- SS Newfoundland, a sealing ship that lost many crew in a disaster in 1914
- HMCS Newfoundland, a proposed and cancelled Canada-class nuclear submarine for Canadian Forces Maritime Command
- 45573 Newfoundland, a British LMS Jubilee Class locomotive

== Animals ==
- Newfoundland dog
- Newfoundland pony
- Newfoundland sheep

== Literature ==
- New Found Land (Christopher novel), a book by John Christopher
- New Found Land (Wolf novel), a book by Allan Wolf
- Dirty Linen and New-Found-Land, a pair of plays by Tom Stoppard that are always performed together
- Newfoundland: Journey Into a Lost Nation, a non-fiction book by Michael Crummey

== See also ==
- Newfoundland expedition (disambiguation)
- Terre-Neuve (disambiguation)
