= Newfoundland expedition (disambiguation) =

Newfoundland expedition was a 1796 Franco-Spanish expedition during the French Revolutionary Wars.

Newfoundland expedition may also refer to:

- Newfoundland expedition (1585), an English naval expedition in 1585
- Newfoundland expedition (1696) of Pierre Le Moyne d'Iberville against English settlements during King William's War
- Newfoundland expedition (1702) of Commodore John Leake against French settlements during Queen Anne's War

== See also ==
- Newfoundland (disambiguation)
- Siege of St. John's, part of a French expedition against English settlements in 1705
- Battle of St. John's, part of a French expedition against English settlements in 1709
- Battle of Signal Hill, the British response to a French expedition against St. John's in 1762
