= The Austerity Program =

- Origin: New York City, New York, U.S.
- Genres: Alternative metal; noise rock; industrial rock; post-hardcore; post-metal
- Years active: 1997–present
- Labels: Hydra Head, Controlled Burn
- Members: Thad Calabrese; Justin Foley
- Website: austerityprogram.com

The Austerity Program is a noise rock and alternative metal band that formed in New York City in 1997, founded by guitarist Justin Foley and bassist Thad Calabrese. The band has a distinct sound; due to their use of a drum machine, the band's categorized as an industrial rock outfit, and comparisons to other bands such as Big Black are made by critics and fans alike. The duo has a warm reputation within the American underground music scene since their formation, and their 2014 album Beyond Calculation was ranked as #12 on Rolling Stone's 20 Best Metal Albums of 2014.

== History ==
The project initially started during the mid-early 1990s after guitarist Justin Foley and bassist Thad Calabrese met in college in New York City. The duo then formed a band called Polonium, which was named after what they believed was the heaviest metal on the periodic table. In 1997, the band renamed themselves as The Austerity Program. After sending out multiple, creatively packaged demos, the band was picked up by Hydra Head Records in 2002, and they released their debut extended play, Terra Nova, in 2003.

In 2007, the duo released their first full-length studio album titled Black Madonna, which, according to the Hydra Head bandcamp page, has nothing to do with the singer Madonna. During spring of 2008, the duo toured with post-metal band Isis. In 2010, the band released a follow-up EP, titled Backsliders and Apostates Will Burn. As a way to market the disc, the band decided to write a humorous press release for it, imitating an irate staff member of Hydra Head complaining about the short run time of the record.

In 2012, after Hydra Head announced that they were financially unable to release more records, the band left the label and created their very own label titled Controlled Burn Records. In 2014, they released their second full-length record, titled Beyond Calculation. The record received warm reception among critics, and it was even listed in Rolling Stone's 20 Best Metal Albums of 2014.

In 2016, the duo re-recorded their early material under the Polonium moniker and issued Seriphim, and album which collects these new recordings, on April 4 of that year. The pair's third full-length as The Austerity Program, Bible Songs 1, was released on June 14, 2019 after a lengthy production process. The album, largely inspired by the darker aspects of Biblical stories, was supported by a short European tour. Its second-half Bible Songs 2 followed on May 1, 2025.

== Members ==
- Thad Calabrese – bass
- Justin Foley – guitar, vocals

== Discography ==
=== Studio albums ===
- Black Madonna (2007, Hydra Head)
- Beyond Calculation (2014, Controlled Burn)
- Bible Songs 1 (2019, Controlled Burn)
- Bible Songs 2 (2025, Controlled Burn)

=== Extended plays ===
- Terra Nova (2003, Hydra Head)
- Backsliders and Apostates Will Burn (2010, Hydra Head)

=== Demos ===
Title	Year	Details
November 2000 Demo	2000	Packaged with a box of firecrackers, a friction strip, and a match
Practice 7-27-02	2002	CD-R packaged in an airtight paper sleeve. Came with a razor blade that the owner could use to open the sleeve.

=== Compilation contributions ===
Year	Track	Album
2003	"Song 10"	The Champions of Sound 2003
2004	"Song 9"	2XH vs. HHR, Vol. 1 - Where Is My Robotic Boot?
2011	"Song 6"	NYC Sucks: Volume 2
