= Tierra Nueva =

Tierra Nueva can refer to these locations

- Tierra Nueva, a municipality in Mexico
- Tierra Nueva (town), a town in San Luis Potosí, Mexico

== See also ==
- Terra Nova (disambiguation)
