= Terre-Neuve =

Terre-Neuve can refer to these locations:

- Terre-Neuve, Artibonite, a commune in Haiti
- Terre Neuve, Saint-Louis-du-Sud, a village in the Saint-Louis-du-Sud commune
- Terre-Neuve, Saint Barthélemy, quartier of Saint Barthélemy
- Terre-Neuve, French name for the Canadian island of Newfoundland

== See also ==
- Newfoundland (disambiguation)
- Terra Nova (disambiguation)
