= Fidelis Zitterbart =

American composer

Fidelis Zitterbart Jr. (April 8, 1845 – August 30, 1915) was an American composer.

== Life and works ==
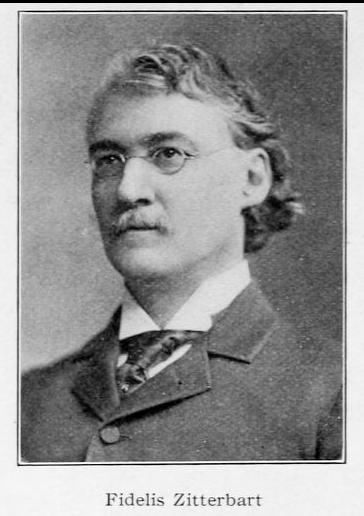
Fidelis Zitterbart in 1908

Zitterbart was born in Pittsburgh in 1845. His father, Fidelis Zitterbart Sr. had emigrated from Austria, and was a career violinist and conductor, who taught his son music from an early age. At the age of 16 the young Zitterbart went abroad to Dresden, where he studied with Francois Schubert and Julius Rühlmann, to complete his musical studies there. Upon his return to the US, he worked as a violinist and violist in NY until 1873 when he returned to Pittsburgh and took a teaching position at the Andrew Williams American Conservatory of Music until the closure of the Conservatory compelled him to start his own music school, the Zitterbart Conservatory. In 1868 he married Catherine Riedl of Worcester, MA (1850–1913) and together they had 4 children.

His father, who had composed as well, tore up his compositions upon seeing that the compositions of his son outshone his own. Zitterbart composed more than a thousand compositions, nearly all of them remained unpublished during his lifetime. In 1930, his son Ralph Zitterbart donated the manuscripts to the University of Pittsburgh following suggestions from Dr. Theodore M. Finney, a musicologist and Dr. Alexander Silverman, a chemist who had studied violin with Zitterbart. The digitized collection is available online.

His compositions included several large-scale works, including "symphonies, concertos, operas, sonatas, 125 string quartets (plus 100 earlier quartets he had thrown away) and dozens of overtures, particularly on Shakespearean themes - Macbeth, Iago and Richard III".

He also composed several works for viola, including, in 1875, the first known American viola sonata, and another 12 more after that. Wikipedia's list of compositions for viola has a partial listing of these compositions for viola.
