= Terra Nova (EP) =

EP by The Austerity Program
- Released: March 25, 2003
- Recorded: January 22–26, 2002, at Fordham Evangelical Lutheran Church Bronx, NY
- Genres: Noise rock, post-metal, industrial rock
- Length: 33:31
- Label: Hydra Head Records
- Producer: The Austerity Program

The Austerity Program chronology
Terra Nova (2003)	Black Madonna (2007)

Professional ratings
Review scores
Source	Rating
Alternative Press	3/5
Pitchfork	8.0/10
Maelstrom Zine	1/10 stars
Vaguely Offensive	4/5 stars
Punknews.org	0.5/5 stars
Sputnikmusic	4.5/5 stars

Terra Nova is the debut EP by American noise rock band the Austerity Program, released in 2003 through Hydra Head Records. The disc received mixed reception, some critics praised its experimental tendencies, while others critiqued repetition. The EP performed poorly commercially, and it is one of the least-selling records Hydra Head has ever released.

== Track listing ==
No.	Title	Length
1.	"Song 8"	9:33
2.	"Song 4"	7:16
3.	"Song 3"	8:36
4.	"Song 11"	8:07

== Personnel ==
The Austerity Program

- Thad Calabrese - Bass
- Justin Foley - Guitar, Vocals
- The Drum Machine - Percussion

Production

- Nick Zampiello - Mastering
- Abby Moskowitz - Photography
- The Austerity Program - Music, Art direction
- A. Tuner - Design and construction
