= Marina Marta Vlad =

Romanian composer

Marina Marta Vlad (born 8 March 1949) is a Romanian composer.

== Biography ==
Marina Marta Vlad was born in Bucharest. She studied violin with Cecilia Geanta at the Music High School in Bucharest, and graduated from the National University of Music Bucharest in 1973. She was awarded a composition prize from the university. After completing her studies, she took a position at the same school, where she taught until 2002. She married composer Ulpiu Vlad.

== Works ==
Selected works include:

Orchestra:

- Symphonic Movement 1979
- Images for strings and orchestra, 1980

Chamber ensemble:

- Sonata for violin and piano, 1978
- String Quartet No. 1, 1981
- String Quartet No. 2, 1982
- Inscriptions for Peace (string trio no. 1) for violin, viola and cello, 1984
- Dream of Peace (string trio no. 2) for violin, viola and cello, 1985
- String Trio No. 3, for violin, viola and cello, 1986
- Light Rays, for flute, oboe and clarinet, 1988
- Thoughts for the Future, for flute, violin, viola and cello, 1989
- Still Life I, for oboe, 1996
- Still Life II, for clarinet, 1997
- Still Life IV, for violin, 1998
- Still Life V, for viola, 1999
- Still Life VI, for cello, 2000
- Still Life VII, for flute, 2000
- Still Life VIII, for bassoon, 2001

Choral works:

- This Country's Land (text by Ion Brad) cantata for baritone, mixed chorus and orchestra, 1987

Piano:

- Rondo, 1978
- Sonata, 1981
- Legend, 1983
- In Search of the Game, 1983
- In Search of the Game No. 2, 1994
- Still Life III, 1997
