= Black Madonna (album) =

Album by the Austerity Program

Studio album by The Austerity Program
- Released: August 21, 2007
- Recorded: August 2006 – January 2007
- Genre: Noise rock, post-hardcore, industrial rock, post-metal
- Length: 44:34
- Label: Hydra Head Records
- Producer: The Austerity Program

The Austerity Program chronology
Terra Nova (2003)	Black Madonna (2007)	Backsliders and Apostates Will Burn (2010)

Professional ratings
Review scores
Source	Rating
Pitchfork	7.8/10
Absolutepunk.net	7.6/10

Black Madonna is the first studio album by American alternative metal duo The Austerity Program, released in 2007 through Hydra Head Records. The title has nothing to do with the singer Madonna, nor does it relate to the Black Madonna statue. Rather, it was picked as a name for the record because "[they] actually have no idea".

== Track listing ==
No.	Title	Length
1.	"Song 12"	5:12
2.	"Song 17B"	8:00
3.	"Untitled"	1:00
4.	"Song 19"	7:05
5.	"Song 18"	1:18
6.	"Untitled"	1:00
7.	"Song 17A"	6:32
8.	"Song 16"	14:17

== Personnel ==
The Austerity Program

- Thad Calabrese - Bass
- Drum Machine - Percussion
- Justin Foley - Guitar, Vocals

Production

- John Golden - Mastering
- John Hastie - Reproduction assistant
- Jon Wright - Additional engineering
- The Austerity Program - Music, photography, art direction
- A. Turner - Design
- James O'Mara - Construction
