= Terra Nova High School =

Terra Nova High School may refer to:

- Terra Nova High School (Oregon) in Portland, Oregon
- Terra Nova High School (California) in Pacifica, California
