= Justus Weinreich =

German composer and musician

Justus Weinreich (May 24, 1858, Kassel - January 19, 1927, Baden-Baden) was a German composer and musician (violinist and violist).

He probably received his first lessons from his father Johann Georg Weinreich, an oboist serving in the Elector's personal bodyguard regiment. After 1873, Weinreich worked as second violin in Kassel's court theater orchestra. Years of traveling followed. From 1876 to 1878 he worked as 1st violinist in Bonn and in 1879–1880 in Königsberg. Weinreich then moved to Baden-Baden. At the beginning of 1883 he joined the Karlsruhe court orchestra as a viola player, rising in 1885 to court musician, in 1893 to 3rd solo viola, and in 1914 to chamber musician. From 1890 to 1923 was solo violist of Badische Staatskapelle, Karlsruhe (Baden State Symphony Orchestra; founded in 1662). Vision problems and a chronic neuralgic complaint forced him to quit his post in 1917. He returned to Baden-Baden where he died on January 19, 1927.

== Compositions ==
His compositions include:

- 3 Duets (G/C/d), op. 5, for 2 Violas
- 3 Suites (Es/F/G), for Solo Viola (Premier recording by Roland Glassl)
- Serenade in D for Violin and Viola
- 2 string quartets
- 18 Etudes for Viola
- "Major and Minor": 24 Etudes and Character Pieces in Every Key for Viola, op. 8
- 4 Pieces for 4 Violins (or 3 violins and viola) in first position (published 1898 by Johann Andre in Offenbach) dedicated to the ""Allgemeinen Musikbildungs-Anstalt"" in Karlsruhe

== References and Further Reading ==
1. Traber, Habakuk, Liner Notes to Roland Glassl's CD, Audite 2016 External Link
2. Sawodny, Wolfgang, "An Unknown Master of the Viola" The Viola : yearbook of the International Viola Research Society (1983) Kassel : Bärenreiter
3. Justus Weinreich on World Cat: World Cat Identity
