= Terra Nova 1260HP diesel hydraulic locomotive =

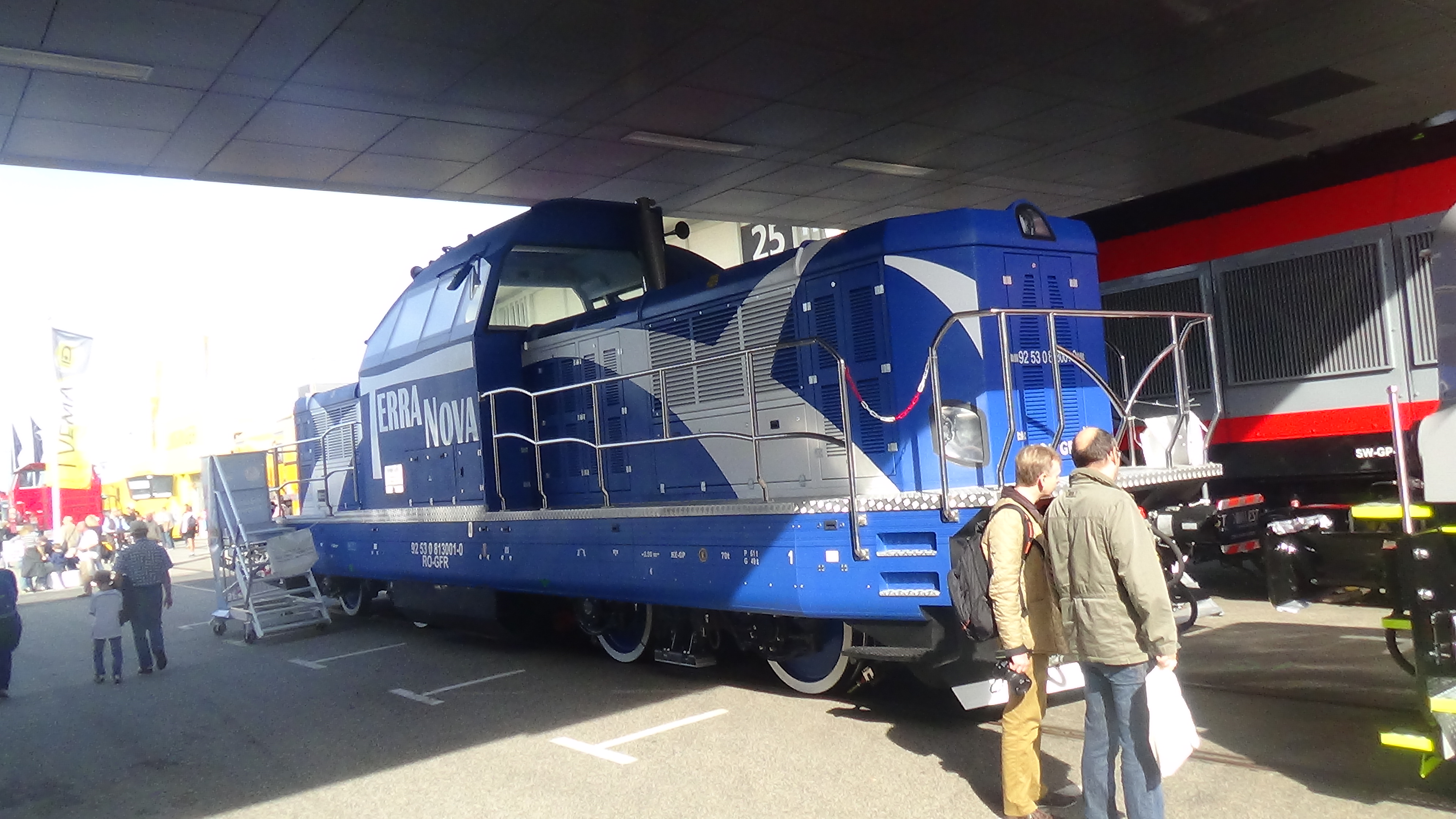
Type and origin
- Power type: Diesel-hydraulic
- Builder: Electroputere VFU / Reloc SA (Romania)
Specifications
- Gauge: Narrow gauge Standard gauge Broad gauge
- Fuel type: Diesel fuel
- Transmission: Hydraulic
Performance figures
- Power output: 1,260 HP (2 x 630)
Career
- Official name: Terra Nova

The Terra Nova locomotive is a diesel-hydraulic locomotive used mainly for heavy shunting operations and light line service. It is produced at Electroputere VFU-Reloc Craiova, Romania and it had its official launching in May 2014, having four axles and the possibility to be adapted to all types of gauges.

== History ==
SC. RELOC SA and Electroputere VFU became part of Grampet Group in 2013, being responsible for the part of construction of new innovative locomotives, research, design of new products and sustainable technologies, but also repairing, manufacturing, modernization of existing locomotives. Since 2014, it has started to produce the Terra Nova locomotive, its future plans for 2015-2018 being to build a new 1,900 kW (2,500 hp) diesel electric locomotive and a new 6,500 kW (8,700 hp) electric locomotive.
