= Daniela Terranova =

Italian composer

Daniela Terranova is an Italian composer working in the area of concert music, opera and extended sonic environments. She studied composition with Azio Corghi and Beat Furrer at the University of Music and Performing Arts Graz. Her music is published by Suvini Zerboni (Milan).

== Prizes ==
In recent years, Terranova has won several national and international competitions, including: first prize at the international competition Gianni Bergamo Classic Music Award, Special Mention for Italian Music, premio SIAE (Rome, Competition Valentino Bucchi - Parco della Musica Contest), the prize Monte dei Paschi di Siena (Accademia Chigiana, Siena), first prize at the international competition contest Musica e Arte (Rome), first prize at the national competition Kinderszenen (Rome), and second prize at the International competition ICOMS (Turin)(Emilio).

In 2014, she won the international competition for the third edition of the Franco Donatoni International Meeting for Young Composers in Milan, and was as a result commissioned to write new composition for ensemble and dance by the Divertimento Ensemble with the support of the Ernst von Siemens Music Foundation.

== Work ==
Terranova's 2015 work for solo cello, A rose is a rose, is a rose, is a rose, written for Francesco Dillon, was identified by the composer as a new starting point in terms of the material she was using and the proximity of her relationship to the instrument. The material from this was later amplified and expanded into her piece for string orchestra, written in the same year, Interno metafisico. "D'après" De Chirico, for string orchestra.

== Performances ==
In 2014, Terranova's Asleep landscape was performed by the Camerata Nordica. Her work was described as being made up of "glassy harmonics creating a shrill, unnerving opening this wraithlike mood was sustained to create an almost surreal dreamscape."

Terranova's 2016 work, Notturno in forma di rosa, was performed by the London Sinfonietta (St John's Smith Square, London), and was subsequently broadcast by BBC Radio 3.

In 2017, she wrote A landscape in my hands for the pianist Anna D'Errico, which premiered at IRCAM in the same year.

== Works ==
• And Time Lets Fall Its Drop, for electric guitar (2018)

• Sentire con tatto, for string quartet (2017)

• A Landscape in My Hands, for piano (2017)

• Solo andata, for ensemble and children choir (2017)

• Di natura sottile, for flute, clarinet, percussion, piano, violin, viola, cello (2016)

• Interno metafisico. "D'après" De Chirico, for string orchestra (2015)

• Asleep Landscape, for soprano, alto saxophone and string orchestra (2014)
