= Ciesinski =

Ciesinski is a surname. Notable people with the surname include:

- Katherine Ciesinski (born 1950), American singer, stage director, and voice professor
- Kristine Ciesinski (1952–2018), American operatic soprano
