= Hinako =

- Gender: Female

Origin
- Origin: Japanese
- Meaning: Different meanings depending on the kanji used

Hinako is a feminine Japanese given name. Notable people with the name include:

== Actors ==
- Hinako Saeki (佐伯 日菜子; born 1977), Japanese actress
- Hinako Sakurai (桜井 日奈子; born 1997), Japanese actress, model and tarento
- Hinako Sano (佐野 ひなこ; born 1994), Japanese actress, model and gravure idol

== Artists and musicians ==
- Hinako Ashihara (芦原 妃名子; 1974–2024), Japanese manga artist
- Hinako Kitano (北野 日奈子; born 1996), Japanese former member of Nogizaka46
- Hinako Omori (大森 日向子), Japanese singer and composer
- Hinako Sugiura (杉浦 日向子; 1958–2005), Japanese manga artist
- Hinako Takagi (高木 日向子; born 1989), Japanese composer and pianist
- Hinako Takanaga (高永 ひなこ), Japanese yaoi manga artist

== Athletes ==
- Hinako Murakami (村上 日奈子; born 2000), Japanese professional footballer
- Hinako Shibuno (渋野 日向子; born 1998), Japanese professional golfer
- Hinako Suzuki, Japanese professional footballer
- Hinako Tomitaka (born 2000), Japanese freestyle skier

== Fictional characters ==
=== Game characters ===
- Hinako Shirai, protagonist of the video game Blue Reflection
- Hinako Shijou, in the game series The King of Fighters
- Hinako Shimizu, in the game series Silent Hill f
- Hinako Moshuku, from the web game Your Turn To Die

=== Anime characters ===
- Hinako (anime character), the protagonist in a three-part OVA series
- Hinako Kitashirakawa (anime character), Tamako Kitashirakawa's late mother in Tamako Market and Tamako Love Story
- Hinako Okita, in the anime series Little Battlers Experience WARS

== See also ==
- Hinako Note, a Japanese manga series
- Hinako Islands
