= Viola sonata =

The viola sonata is a sonata for viola, sometimes with other instruments, usually piano. The earliest viola sonatas are difficult to date for a number of reasons:

- in the Baroque era, there were many works written for the viola da gamba, including sonatas (the most famous being Johann Sebastian Bach's Three Sonatas for Viola da Gamba and Harpsichord, now most often played on the cello)
- in the Classical era and early Romantic, there were few works written with viola specifically in mind as solo instrument, and many of these, like those of the Stamitz family, may have been written for the viola d'amore, like most of their viola works—though it is now customary to play them on the viola; it was more typical to publish a work or set, like George Onslow's opus 16 cello sonatas, or Johannes Brahms's Two Clarinet Sonatas in the late 19th century, that specified the viola as an alternate. Two early exceptions were the viola sonata of Felix Mendelssohn (1824, posthumously published in 1966) and the opus 1 sonata of the composer Ernst Naumann (1832–1910), published in 1854.
- The viola returned to a solo role in the 20th century. Max Reger wrote three sonatas for either clarinet or viola at the beginning of the century. Paul Hindemith, himself a viola virtuoso, composed works several sonatas for viola solo, and others for viola and piano such as the Sonata for Viola and Piano, Op. 11 No. 4 in 1919. Rebecca Clarke composed the Sonata for viola and piano the same year. Bax's Viola Sonata, written (like Walton's concerto) for the great English viola player Lionel Tertis in 1923, is one of his most-played and oft-recorded chamber works. Mieczysław Weinberg wrote four viola sonatas between 1971 and 1983. The Sonata for Viola and Piano, Op. 147, is the last composition by Dmitri Shostakovich, completed in July 1975 and dedicated to Fyodor Druzhinin. György Ligeti wrote his Sonata for Solo Viola between 1991 and 1994.
- In the 21st century, Graham Waterhouse wrote a viola sonata entitled Sonata ebraica, completed in 2013.

== Work list ==
- Malcolm Arnold
  - Sonata for Viola and Piano, Op. 17 (1947)
- Granville Bantock
  - Sonata in F for Viola and Piano "Colleen" (1919)
- Jan Zdeněk Bartoš
  - Sonatina for Viola and Piano, Op. 46
- Marion Bauer
  - Sonata for Viola, Op. 22 (1932)
- Arnold Bax
  - Sonata for Viola and Piano in G (1921–1922)
  - Fantasy Sonata for Viola and Harp (1927)
- Jack Beeson
  - Sonata for Viola and Piano (1953)
- Arthur Benjamin
  - Sonata in E minor (1942)
- Lennox Berkeley
  - Sonata in D minor for Viola and Piano, Op. 22 (1945)
- Valentin Bibik
  - Sonata for Solo Viola No. 1, Op. 31 (1977)
  - Sonata for Solo Viola No. 2, Op. 136 (1999)
  - Sonata for Viola and Piano No. 1, Op. 72 (1988)
  - Sonata for Viola and Piano No. 2, Op. 137 (2000)
- Easley Blackwood Jr.
  - Sonata No. 1, Op. 1 (1953)
  - Sonata No. 2, Op. 43 (2001)
- Arthur Bliss
  - Sonata for Viola and Piano (1933)
- Luigi Boccherini
  - Sonata Viola (or Cello) and Continuo in C minor, G.18
- York Bowen
  - Sonata No. 1 in C minor, Op. 18 (1911?)
  - Sonata No. 2 in F major, Op. 22 (1911)
- Johannes Brahms
  - Sonata in F minor for Viola and Piano, Op. 120 No. 1 (1894)
  - Sonata in E♭ major for Viola and Piano, Op. 120 No. 2 (1894) (Note: Composer's adaptation of the two Clarinet Sonatas)
- James Francis Brown
  - Sonata for Viola (1995)
- Arthur Butterworth
  - Sonata for Viola and Piano (1986, though sketched 1949)
- Mario Castelnuovo-Tedesco
  - Sonata for Viola and Harp, Op. 144
- Paul Chihara
  - Sonata for Viola and Piano (1996)
- Rebecca Clarke
  - Sonata for Viola and Piano (1919)
- Carl Ditters von Dittersdorf
  - Sonatas for Viola and Piano
- Felix Draeseke
  - Sonata in C minor (1892)
  - Sonata in F (1901–2) (Note: Both composed for Hermann Ritter's viola alta)
- Lorenzo Ferrero
  - Sonata for Viola and Piano (2000)
- Jacobo Ficher
  - Sonata for Viola and Piano, Op. 80 (1953)
- Ross Lee Finney
  - Sonata for Viola and Piano
- Lillian Fuchs
  - Sonata pastorale, for Solo Viola
- Robert Fuchs
  - Sonata for Viola and Piano in D minor, Op. 86
- Harald Genzmer
  - Sonata for Solo Viola (1957)
  - Sonata for Viola and Piano
  - Sonatine for Viola and Piano
- Roberto Gerhard
  - Sonata for Viola and Piano (1946) (Note: Later reworked as his Cello Sonata.)
- Mikhail Glinka
  - Sonata in D minor for Viola and Piano (incomplete) (1835)
- Hilding Hallnäs
  - Sonata for Viola and Piano, Op. 19 (1943)
- Hans Werner Henze
  - Sonata for Viola (1979)
- Kurt Hessenberg
  - Sonata for Viola and Piano, Op. 94
- Jennifer Higdon
  - Sonata for Viola and Piano (1990)
- Paul Hindemith
  - Sonata for Solo Viola, Op. 11 No. 5 (1919)
  - Sonata for Solo Viola, Op. 25 No. 1 (1922)
  - Sonata for Solo Viola, Op. 31 No. 4 (1923)
  - Sonata for Solo Viola (1937)
  - Sonata for Viola and Piano, Op. 11 No. 4 (1919)
  - Sonata for Viola and Piano, Op. 25 No. 4 (1922)
  - Sonata for Viola and Piano (1939)
- Vagn Holmboe
  - Sonata for Solo Viola
- Arthur Honegger
  - Sonata for Viola (1920)
- Alan Hovhaness
  - Campuan Sonata for Viola and Piano, Op. 371 (1982)
  - Sonata for Solo Viola, Op. 423
- Bertold Hummel
  - Sonatina No.1, Op. 35b (1969)
  - Sonatina No.2, Op. 52b (1973)
- Johann Nepomuk Hummel
  - Sonata in E♭ for Viola and Piano, Op. 5, No. 3
- Miriam Hyde
  - Sonata in B minor for Viola and Piano (1937)
- Gordon Jacob
  - Sonata No. 1 (1949)
  - Sonata No. 2 (1978)
- David Johnstone
  - Sonatango for Solo Viola (2007)
- Paul Juon
  - Viola Sonata in D, Op. 15 (1901)
  - Viola Sonata in F minor, Op. 82 (1923) (Note: Transcription of Clarinet Sonata)
- Aram Khachaturian
  - Sonata for Solo Viola
- Friedrich Kiel
  - Sonata, Op. 67 in G minor
- Luigi von Kunits
  - Sonata for Viola and Piano (1917)
- Ernst Krenek
  - Sonata for Solo Viola
- Libby Larsen
  - Sonata for Viola and Piano (2001)
- Victor Legley
  - Sonata for Viola and Piano, Op. 13 (1943)
- Lowell Liebermann
  - Sonata for Viola and Piano, Op.13 (1984)
- György Ligeti
  - Sonata for Solo Viola (1991–94)
- Bohuslav Martinů
  - Sonata for Viola and Piano (1955)
- Felix Mendelssohn
  - Sonata for Viola and Piano in C minor (1824)
- Darius Milhaud
  - Sonata No. 1 for Viola and Piano, Op. 240 (1941)
  - Sonata No. 2 for Viola and Piano, Op. 244 (1944)
- José Pablo Moncayo
  - Sonata for Viola and Piano (1934)
- Paul Müller-Zürich
  - Sonata for Solo Viola (1979)
- Jacques Murgier
  - Sonata for Solo Viola
- Ernst Naumann
  - Sonata in G minor for Viola and Piano, Op. 1 (1854)
- Ludvig Norman
  - Sonata in G Minor for Viola and Piano, Op. 32 (1869)
- George Onslow
  - Three sonatas for Viola (or cello), Op. 16
- George Perle
  - Sonata for Viola Solo, Op. 12
- Max Reger
  - Sonatas in A♭ major and F♯ minor for Viola and Piano, Op. 49 Nos. 1 and 2 (1900) (Note: Alternate versions of Clarinet Sonatas.)
  - Sonata in B♭ major for Viola and Piano, Op. 107 (1908-9)
- George Rochberg
  - Sonata for Viola and Piano (1979)
- Alessandro Rolla
  - Sonatas for Viola with Continuo
- Johannes Röntgen
  - Sonata for Viola and Piano
- Julius Röntgen
  - Sonata in C minor for Viola and Piano (1924)
  - Sonata in A♭ major for Viola and Piano (1925)
  - Sonata in A minor for Viola and Piano (1925)
- Nino Rota
  - Viola Sonata in G (1934–35, revised 1970)
  - Viola Sonata in C major (1945)
- Anton Rubinstein
  - Sonata in F minor for Viola and Piano, Op. 49 (1855)
- Philipp Scharwenka
  - Sonate fantasia in G minor for Viola and Piano, Op. 106 (1899)
- Peter Sculthorpe
  - Sonata for Viola and Percussion
- José Serebrier
  - Sonata for Solo Viola (1955)
- Alexander Shchetynsky
  - Sonata for Solo Viola (1987)
- Vissarion Shebalin
  - Sonata for Viola and Piano
- Dmitri Shostakovich
  - Sonata for Viola and Piano, Op. 147 (1975)
- David Stanley Smith
  - Viola Sonata, Op. 72 (1934)
- Carl Stamitz
  - Sonata for Viola (Note: Originally for Viola d'amore.)
- Constantinos Stylianou
  - Sonata for Viola and Piano No. 1 in F minor (2019)
  - Sonata for Viola and Piano No. 2 in E♭ major (2020)
- Eduard Tubin
  - Viola Sonata (1965)
  - Four Sonatas for Viola and Piano, Op. 5 (in C major, D, F and C)
- Octavio Vazquez
  - Sonata for Viola and Piano No. 1 (1992)
  - Sonata for Viola and Piano No. 2 (2002)
- Henri Vieuxtemps
  - Sonata in B♭ major for Viola and Piano, Op. 36 (1862)
  - Sonate inachevée (Allegro et scherzo) for Viola and Piano, Op. 60 (Op. 14 posthumous) (1884)
- Andrei Volkonsky
  - Sonata for Viola and Piano, Op. 8 (1955–56)
- Johann Baptist Wanhal
  - Viola Sonata in E♭
- Graham Waterhouse
  - Sonata ebraica (2013)
- Mieczysław Weinberg
  - Sonata for Solo Viola No. 1, Op. 107 (1971)
  - Sonata for Solo Viola No. 2, Op. 123 (1978)
  - Sonata for Solo Viola No. 3, Op. 135 (1982)
  - Sonata for Solo Viola No. 4, Op. 136 (1983)
- George Balch Wilson
  - Sonata for Viola and Piano (1952)
- Richard Edward Wilson
  - Sonata for Viola and Piano (1989)

== See also ==
- Viola repertoire
- Viola concerto
