= Viola Sonata (Ligeti) =

Sonata for Viola
- by György Ligeti
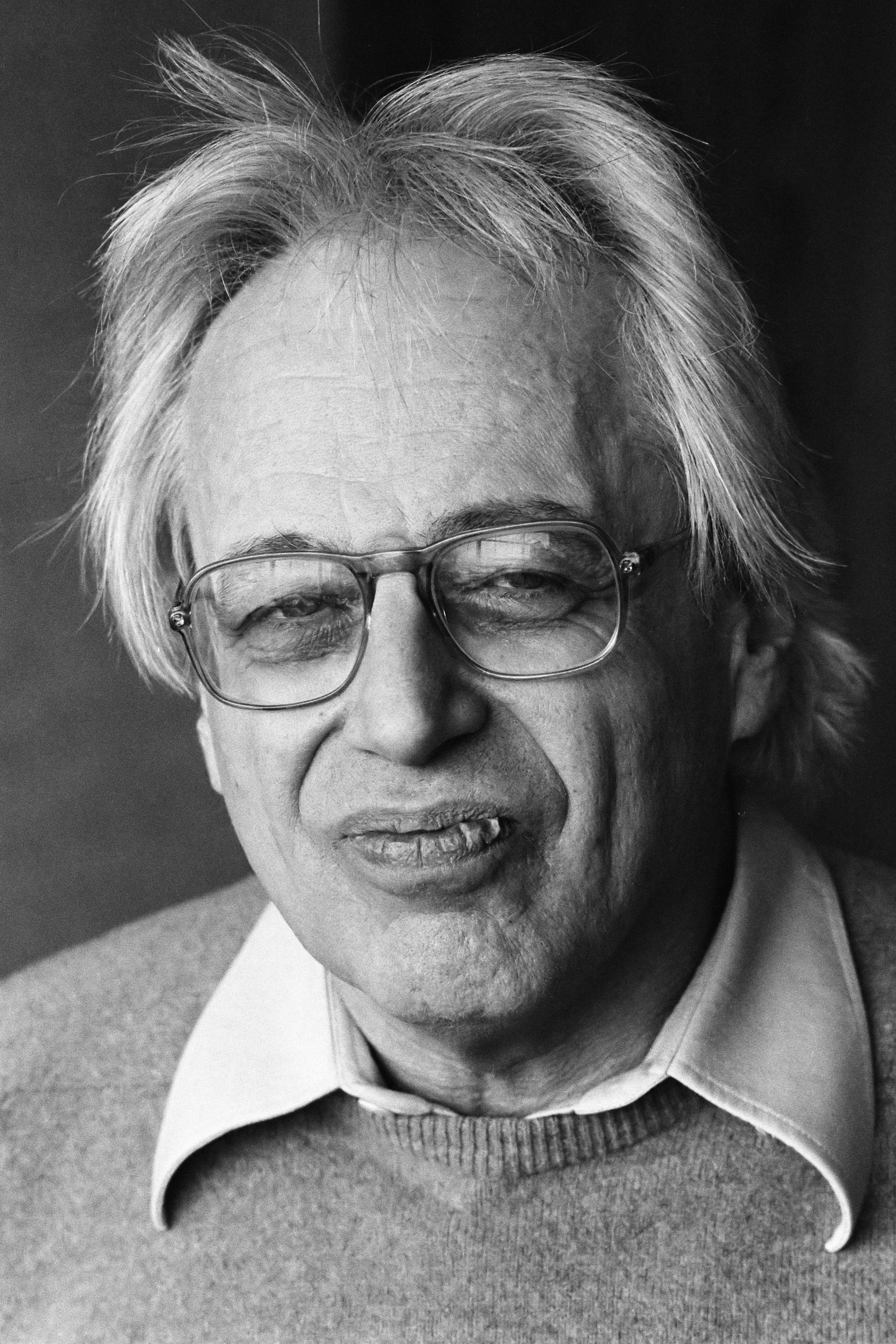
- The composer in 1984
- Period: contemporary music
- Form: sonata
- Composed: 1991–94
- Movements: six

György Ligeti composed his Viola Sonata between 1991 and 1994. It is a sonata for viola solo in six movements, and Ligeti composed it in various phases, parallel with his Violin Concerto, and his piano études. The composer was inspired to write a viola sonata after hearing Tabea Zimmermann playing on the radio, then began writing various movements. The second movement Loop, was premiered by Garth Knox (then violist of the Arditti Quartet), while Facsar was premiered in 1993 by Jürg Dahler. The two movements were conceived as part of a complete work and they became the second and third movements of Ligeti's Viola Sonata.

The sonata is a departure from Ligeti's Cello Sonata, composed 40 years earlier and represents an important turning point. In contrast with the earlier work, his Viola Sonata follows a pattern reminiscent of the Baroque sonata, with its many movements of contrasting tempi and rhythms. The fifth movement, a slow Lamento, comes between a prestissimo and the final vivace, chromatic chaconne. This perhaps harks back to Frescobaldi's sonatas where one can find a Toccata Cromatica as well as examples of the passacaglia and chaconne. The first and third movements are variations on an ostinato, and alternate between the moto perpetuo movements that are the second and the fourth. In the first, fourth and fifth movement, one finds elements of Eastern European traditional music, while the influence of free rhythms and jazz and Latin harmonies intervene more in the second, third and sixth movement. Other characteristic features are the harmonies in the first and fourth movements and the repeated chords in the second and sixth. Critic Blair Sanderson referred to the sonata as "one of the major viola works of the 20th century".

== Movements ==
The work consists of six movements:

1. Hora lungă
2. Loop
3. Facsar
4. Prestissimo with sordino
5. Lamento
6. Chaconne chromatique

=== I. Hora lungă ===
The first movement, Hora lungă takes influences of the Romanian folksong style of the same name. The title means "slow Hora", but in this case hora could be understood as the Romanian word for "dance". The entire movement is played on the C string, and uses microtonal intervals that imitate mostly the harmonic Scale of F. Other examples of passages on a single string include the Aria from Ligeti's Violin Concerto (74 measures on the G string) and the third movement of the Viola Sonata, Facsar, which probably influenced the first movement, as Ligeti wrote the two movements in the same year.

To indicate microtones, Ligeti uses the sonata three downward arrows for alterations of -49, -31 and -14 cents, respectively. The use of microtonal intervals is common in the works of Ligeti. In the Viola Sonata, their use follows the harmonic Scale on F. In this way, the harmonic construction, with -49 cents lower on B♮, -31 cents lower on E♭, and -14 cents lower on the A♮, the ear suggests the resonance of the imaginary "fifth" string F, which would lie a fifth below the viola's lowest C, which makes the movement in some aspects similar to spectral music.

The movement consists of the theme introduced in mm. 1–2, with six repeated transformations (mm. 2–5, 5–8, 9–14, 16–19, 19–32, 32–37) and a sort of interlude (mm. 15–16) that employs an arpeggiated figuration of harmonics that ascends on the C string. The only break of the movement lasts one-sixteenth and the end of the interlude, providing a reference point for conceptual bisection of the movement. The fifth transformation includes a large crescendo and climax, with the dynamic ffff in mm. 29. The last section consists entirely of natural harmonics, based on a second harmonic scale on C as opposed to the aforementioned harmonic scale on F.

=== II. Loop ===
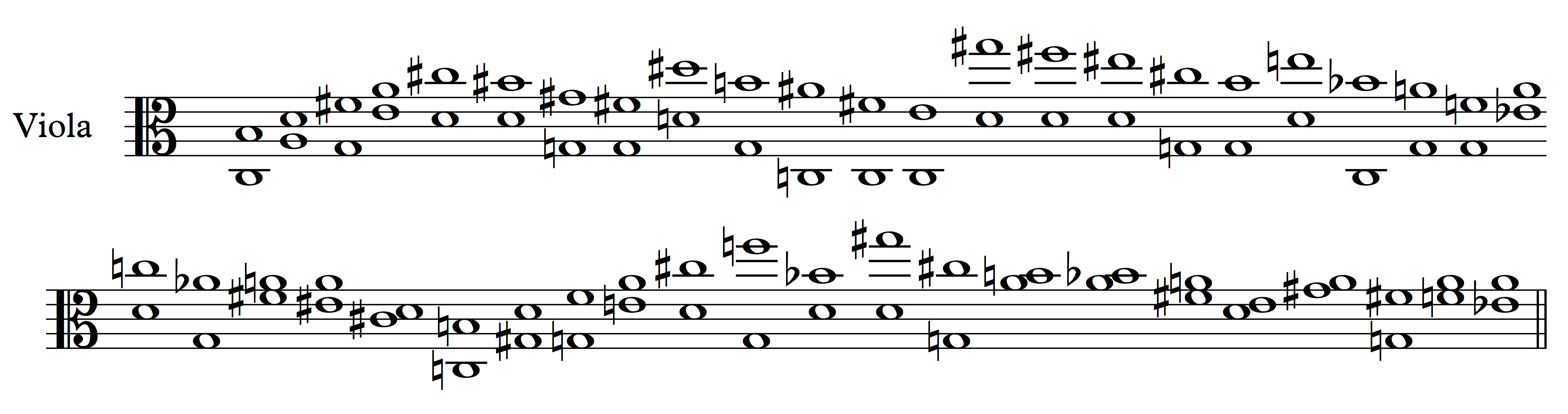
The 45 double stops that repeat throughout the piece.

The second movement, Loop, employs similar diminutives procedures to Renaissance motets, which contrast with the augmentation employed in the previous movement. There is a clear jazz influence in the movement and there is an indication to play "with swing", perhaps due to the influence of the music of Stéphane Grappelli. The entire work consists of 45 double stops that are looped, with a 3-bar introduction. The technical difficulty is remarkable, the double stops always include one open string and involve wide jumps between different positions that are rather challenging for the left hand. The difficulty and intensity increase gradually and propel the musical argument towards an interrupted finale.

=== III. Facsar ===
The Facsar shows the emphasis on the rhythm of the second movement with the melodic and harmonic language, with a constant transformation of the thematic material in all ways possible. There is always a main theme (mm. 1–10) followed by constant transfigurations, which are always in the same duration, in contrast with the techniques augmentative and diminutive of the preceding movements. In this way, the frame is broken by a Più mosso section (mm. 60–64) and a coda of six closing bars (mm. 90–96).

The structure is very regular and schematic, but Ligeti uses the dynamics to try to hide structural divisions, avoiding placing emphasis on the beginnings of the episodes. In bars 40 and 41, he achieves this by adding more slurs, which anticipate the tempo and dynamics of measure 60. Then, between measures 70 and 72, he achieves a crescendo that also has the effect of blurring the sense of division. The indications of expression and dynamics are not the result of formal and structural considerations but were in fact defined by Ligeti during 'rehearsals' in which he asked Garth Knox to try out passages with different indications until he found the ones that he preferred.

=== IV. Prestissimo with sordino ===
In the fourth movement, Ligeti employs combinations of accents, highly contrasted dynamics such as ff followed one quaver later by pp, adjacent notes or very close intervals, open strings, double stops and harmonics, all played 'as fast as possible'. The effect is original and disquieting but does not require highly dissonant or chromatic writing to make its impact In the subsequent occurrences of the thematic material, the composer makes changes through addition or subtraction of notes, transforming individual notes in chords and vice versa, and consequently adapting the accentuation and dynamics.

=== V. Lamento ===
The fifth movement, Lamento, includes an idée fixe, that he also used in Automne à Varsovie (from his Piano Études), his violin and piano concerti, and in various other chamber works. But the theme originates from his Musica ricercata.

The movement is related to the French baroque dance loure, that is usually in 6/4, as the movement alternates between 5/8 and 7/8, suggesting an asymmetric division of 12/8. The Lamento motif consists of three phrases, which constitute the theme (mm. 1–7), followed by four transformations (mm. 12–18, 25–33, 41–49, 53–62), interspersed with interludes and followed by a coda (mm. 63–64).

=== VI. Chaconne chromatique ===
The Chaconne chromatique is related to the Renaissance and Baroque equivalent. This last movement takes up and amplifies the ternary form of the subject in the previous Lamento, with a theme (mm. 1–8) that is transformed repeatedly, altering the harmonic and chromatic identity from the second transformation into the other transformations. In particular, the fourth transformation is a progressive thickening of the musical texture, as the double stops are amplified to triple stops and quadruple stops, parallel to the intensification of the dynamics, similarly to what was heard in Facsar.

The underlying idea is a chromatically descending cantus firmus, which is preserved in most of the repetitions, with minor alterations. The main alterations are the addition of a bar consisting of triple stops, and a crescendo in bar 57, delaying the start of the seventh transformation with one measure. The other alteration, is the addition of a 4/4 bar in bar 73, and the eighth transformation, is reduced to six strokes, reaching to an end in bar 79. In the latter section, the music intensifies and the climax is interrupted in bar 80 with the tempo marking Meno mosso, molto cantabile, ending quietly.

== Bibliography ==
- Bauer, Amy Marie (2011). Ligeti's Laments: Nostalgia, exoticism and the Absolute. Ashgate Publishing. ISBN 978-1-4094-0041-7.
- Dwyer, Benjamin (2011). "Transformational Ostinati in Ligeti's Sonatas for Solo Cello and Solo Viola". In Duchesneau, Louise; Marx, Wolfgang (eds.). György Ligeti: Of Foreign Lands and Strange Sounds. Boydell & Brewer. ISBN 978-1-8438-3550-9.
- Stulz, John (2012). Cool Memories: Notes on the Ligeti Viola Sonata (PDF). Archived from the original (PDF) on May 27, 2016.
