= Thomas Friedli =

Swiss musician (1946–2008)

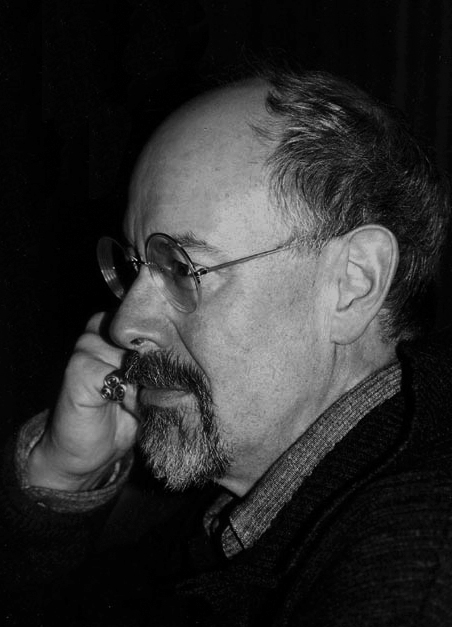
Clarinetist Thomas Friedli

Thomas Friedli (June 30, 1946 – April 14, 2008) was an internationally renowned Swiss clarinetist. He died in 2008 in Madeira.

== Biography ==
Thomas Friedli studied in Bern, Lausanne and Paris (with Jacques Lancelot) before winning 1st Prize and "Prix Ernest Ansermet" at the Geneva International Music Competition in 1972 (he would be Jury President of the same competition in 2007). He was from 1971 to 1986 principal clarinetist of the Berner Symphonie-Orchester and then occupied the same post in the Orchestre de Chambre de Lausanne. Performing worldwide, he appeared at festivals in Lucerne, Ibiza, Stresa, Gstaad, Bratislava or São Paulo to name a few. He premiered numerous pieces by composers such as Franz Tischhauser or Sándor Veress and received a "Gold Record" from Claves for his recording of the Mozart concerto in A. Besides his activity as a soloist and principal clarinetist, Thomas Friedli was also an accomplished chamber musician and was interested in the big repertoire from the Classical and Romantic periods as well as in contemporary music, while he had a particular preference for bringing neglected works to life. A dedicated teacher, he participated in numerous master classes and led a professional performer's class at Conservatoire de Genève from 1978 until his death during a hiking accident in Madeira in April 2008.

== Discography ==
- Mozart : Clarinet concerto (Claves)
- Zemlinsky - Max Bruch : Trio in D minor, Op. 3; Eight pieces, Op. 83 (Claves)
- Brahms : Clarinet Quintet (Claves)
- Robert Schumann (Claves)
- Franz Krommer - Schnyder von Wartensee : Sinfonia concertante op. 80 - Concerto for two clarinets (Claves)
- Strauss - Duetto Concertino with Klaus Thunemann
- French Music for Clarinet (Claves) with Ulrich Koella
- Pleyel, Molter, Mercadante Clarinet Concertos - Südwestdeutsches Kammerorchester. Paul Angerer – (Claves 50-813)
- Tischauer: The Baggar's Concerto, Orchestre de Chambre de Lausanne, Armin Jordan - (Claves 8712)
