= Hong-Mei Xiao =

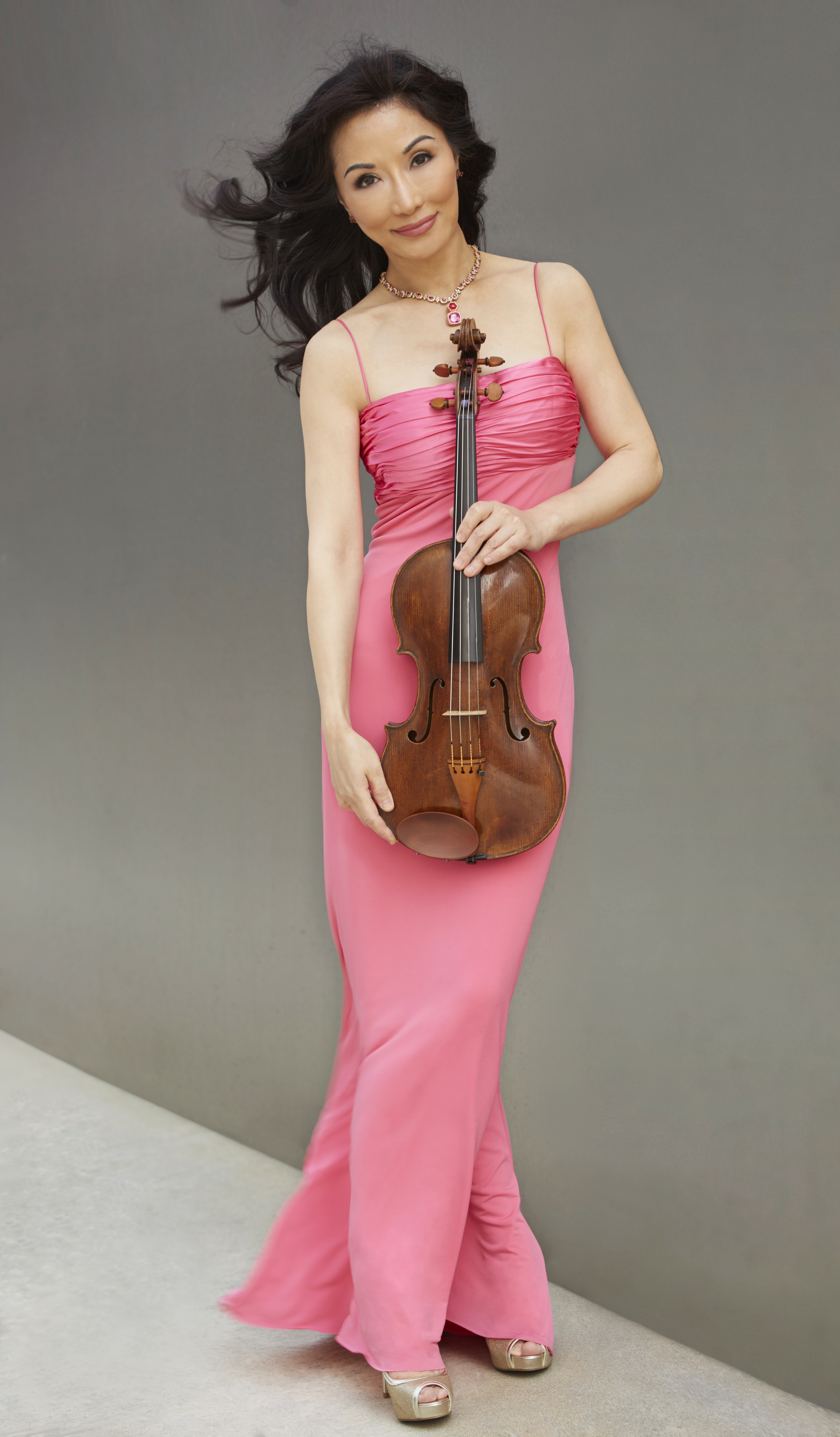
- Hong-Mei Xiao

Background information
- Born: Qingdao, China
- Genres: Classical
- Occupations: Musician and Educator
- Instrument: Viola
- Label: Naxos Records
- Website: www.hongmeixiao.com

Hong-Mei Xiao is a Chinese-born American violist. She won first prize at the Geneva International Music Competition, and is a recipient of the Patek Philippe Grand Prize. Hong-Mei Xiao's career as an international soloist comprises critically acclaimed performances in major concert halls and with orchestras of great distinction throughout the world. An award winning recording artist, her CDs have been released by labels such as Delos Productions and Naxos Records. She was also honored as a United States Artistic Ambassador.

== Early life and studies ==
Hong-Mei Xiao grew up in a musical family. Her father, the renowned composer Xiao Heng, provided her early violin training. Her mother, Guifang Sui, was a music teacher. Throughout her youth she performed in various public venues in China. She attended the Shanghai Conservatory of Music, graduating with highest honors. Xiao received the Asian Cultural Council Award in 1984. She continued her musical training with violist John Graham in the United States, and received her Master of Music degree from the State University of New York at Stony Brook.

== Career ==
=== Performer ===
Hong-Mei Xiao has toured throughout Europe, North and South America, and Asia as a soloist, performing in major concert halls such as:

- New York Carnegie Hall Stern Auditorium
- Alice Tully Hall
- Berliner Philharmonie Hall
- Geneva Victoria Hall
- Zurich Tonhalle
- Hungarian State Opera House
- Beijing National Centre for the Performing Arts
- Tokyo Suntory Hall
- Hong Kong Cultural Center
- Shanghai Concert Hall
- Taipei National Concert Hall

She has appeared as a soloist with renowned orchestras including:

- L'Orchestre de la Suisse Romande
- NDR Elbphilharmonie Orchestra
- Budapest Philharmonic Orchestra
- European Union Chamber Orchestra
- Orchestergesellschaft Biel
- Orchestra Sinfonica Siciliana
- Russian Philharmonic Orchestra
- Israel Ra'anana Symphony
- Orquesta Sinfónica del Estado de México
- Budapest Symphony Orchestra MAV
- Japan Philharmonic
- Minnesota Orchestra
- Aspen Music Festival Orchestra
- Shanghai Symphony
- National Taiwan Symphony Orchestra

== Playing style ==
Xiao’s playing style has been referred to by critics as masterful, spectacular, virtuosic, brilliant, expressive, energetic, intelligent, precise, and soulful. Stylistic critiques include:

- “[Xiao] played with the highest measure of ringing warmth of tone and brilliant technique.” -- Berliner Morgenpost (Germany)
- “Her rich tone, her brilliant virtuosity and her sense of phrasing let the music express itself in a pure way." -- Geneva Tribune (Switzerland)
- "Her playing manifested an ideal velvet sonority and a purity of legato in the cantabile passages, and a prestigious and flexible technique with solidity and energy in the virtuoso passages."—The Courier (Switzerland)
- "The solo playing is spectacular on all counts." -- American Record Guide (United States)
- "The winner of the Geneva International music Competition provided us with an overwhelming masterful performance." The Geneva Journal (Switzerland)

== Instruments ==
Xiao's primary performance instrument is a viola made by Mantegazza in 1796 in Milan, Italy.

== Discography ==
A partial list of her recordings includes:

- English Works for Viola and Orchestra, Budapest Symphony Orchestra - Janos Kovacs, Conductor
- Bloch: Suite for Viola and Orchestra / Baal Shem / Suite Hebraique, Budapest Symphony
- Bartok: Viola Concertos, Budapest Philharmonic Orchestra - Janos Kovacs, Conductor
- Solos: Solo Works of Daniel Asia, Solo works featuring Orange for Solo Viola
- The Art of Viola, Budapest Philharmonic Orchestra - Janos Kovacs, Conductor

== Notable awards and recognitions ==
- 1984 Asian Cultural Council Award
- 1987 First-prize winner of the Geneva International Music Competition
- 1987 Winner of the Patek Philippe Grand Prize
- 1988-89 United States Artistic Ambassador
- 2013 “Critic’s Choice Award” from American Record Guide for her CD with the Budapest Symphony of Complete Works for Viola and Orchestra by Ernest Bloch
