= Ivan Kotov =

Russian double bassist

Ivan Ivanovich Kotov
- Иван Иванович Котов
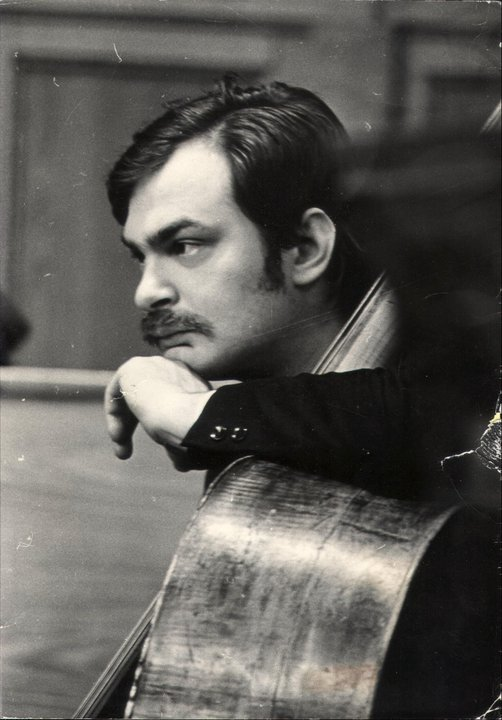
- Ivan Kotov in Moscow (1977)
- Born: March 24, 1950; Moscow, Soviet Union
- Died: November 21, 1985 (aged 35)
- Occupation: Bassist
- Parents: Ivan Ivanovich Kotov (father); Nina Fominichna (mother)

Ivan Ivanovich Kotov (Russian: Иван Иванович Котов, Ivan Ivanovich Kotov; born 24 March 1950 - died 21 November 1985) was a Russian double bassist.

Kotov is celebrated for his musicianship and for his work raising the profile of the double-bass as a concert instrument.

He was one of the musicians who founded the Moscow Chamber Music Theater and is often referred to as the "Enrico Caruso of the Double-bass."

== Life ==
Ivan Kotov was born in Moscow, Soviet Union, to the mathematician Ivan Ivanovich Kotov and to the mathematics teacher Nina Fominichna (nee Klubnichkina).

He began playing cello at the age of seven and was accepted to the Central Music School at the age of nine and transferred to a double bass class. Ivan Kotov graduated from the Moscow Conservatory where he studied with Evgeny Kolosov.

== Education & Career ==
In 1973 Ivan Kotov has been awarded 1st Prize unanimously and all special prizes and become the first double bassist to win 1st Prize at the Geneva International Music Competition.

Ivan Kotov was the first Soviet double bassist - laureate of an international competition.

Since Ivan was a student, Ivan worked at the Symphony orchestra of the Moscow Philharmonia under the baton of Kirill Kondrashin and at the State Symphony orchestra under the baton of Evgeny Svetlanov.

Ivan Kotov has actively promoted and premiered works of Russian avant-garde composers such as Sofia Gubaidulina, Dmitry Smirnov, organist and composer Oleg Yanchenko, Sandor Kallos, who dedicated "Seven Ricercars" for Bass Solo to Ivan Kotov.

As a soloist, Ivan Kotov performed with such orchestras as Orchestre de la Suisse Romande, Moscow State Symphony Orchestra, Moscow Chamber Orchestra, with conductors Armin Jordan, Veronika Dudarova, Lev Markiz.

Ivan’s rebellious temperament meant he was not a "politically reliable citizen" in the police state of the Soviet Union and so he was often subjected to continuous persecution and public humiliation, and denial of access to medical care.

== Recognition ==
"Ivan Kotov, double bass, is a musician of huge intelligence and cultured musical taste. It is almost impossible to overestimate the great commitment of all performers, who have undertaken to bring to the audiences new compositions. Ivan Kotov and his music deserve special recognition." Soviet Musician "Our Creative Reserves on Podium", 5th April, 1972. "In Ivan Kotov`s virtuosity, mastery and freedom with which he plays his instrument, one overcomes the inhibitions about the "limits" of the double bass." M.Ovchinnikov. Soviet Music. November 1973. "Young Musicians Performing".

"I would like to start with the double bass. It is first time ever that our musicians competed in this instrument. It was a demanding contest. 31 contestants have been admitted to the First Round, which was held behind the screen. Second Round gave the platform to 7 contestants, and third - three only. Among those three musicians was Ivan Kotov. His virtuoso performance of the Divertimento by the contemporary Swiss composer Zbinden was especially successful. Ivan Kotov is a Muscovite and a student at the Moscow Conservatory." Elena Novikova, Ministry of Culture. Pravda, 1st October, 1973. "Laureates Have Been Named"
