= Toshiko Kohno =

Japanese flautist

- Born: 1953 or 1954 (age 70–71); Tokyo, Japan
- Occupation: Flautist
- Years active: 1973–2012

Toshiko Kohno is a Japanese flautist. She was principal flautist for the National Symphony Orchestra from 1978 to 2012, as well as the first prize winner of the 1973 Geneva International Music Competition.

== Career ==
Kohno was taught by Doriot Anthony Dwyer, principal flute for the Boston Symphony Orchestra, as well as Joseph Mariano at the Eastman School of Music. In 1973, she won the Geneva International Music Competition. Kohno was a member of the Buffalo Philharmonic Orchestra from 1973 to 1976. She was associate principal flute for the Montreal Symphony Orchestra before joining the National Symphony Orchestra, under Mstislav Rostropovich, as principal flautist in 1978. Kohno taught at the Levine School of Music, and has been on the faculty of the Affinis Music Festival. She retired from the National Symphony Orchestra in 2012.

== Personal life ==
Kohno was born in Tokyo, Japan. Her mother is the pianist Sumiko Kohno, with whom she participated in a benefit concert for the Japan–America Society in September 1981, alongside violinist Masuko Ushioda.

== Discography ==
- The Beauty of Two (2008, Dorian) – The Kennedy Center Chamber Players
  - Francis Poulenc's Flute Sonata
