= Viola Concerto (Bartók) =

Composition by Béla Bartók, incomplete at his death

- by Béla Bartók
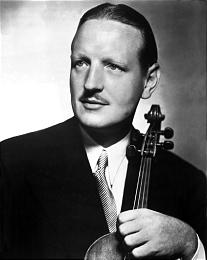
- The violist William Primrose who commissioned and premiered the concerto
- Catalogue: Sz. 120, BB 128
- Composed: 1945
- Dedication: William Primrose
- Performed: December 2, 1949: Minneapolis
- Movements: Three

The Viola Concerto, Sz. 120, BB 128 (also known as Concerto for Viola and Orchestra) was one of the last pieces Béla Bartók wrote. He began composing it while living in Saranac Lake, New York, in July 1945. It was commissioned by William Primrose, a respected violist who knew that Bartók could provide a challenging piece for him to perform. He said that Bartók should not "feel in any way proscribed by the apparent technical limitations of the instrument". Bartók was suffering the terminal stages of leukemia when he began writing the piece and left only sketches at the time of his death.

== History and Performance Editions ==
Primrose asked Bartók to write the concerto in the winter of 1944. They exchanged several letters about the piece. In one, from September 8, 1945, Bartók claims that he is nearly done with it and only has the orchestration to complete, but the sketches he left behind do not reflect it. On his death-bed Bartók left a draft of what contained almost all of the solo viola part, but debate still persists on whether he really intended a four or a three-movement work. Bartók wrote in a letter dated August 5, 1945 that the general concept is "a serious Allegro, a Scherzo, a (rather short) slow movement, and a finale beginning Allegretto and developing the tempo to an Allegro molto. Each movement, or at least 3 of them will, [be] preceded by a (short) recurring introduction (mostly solo for the viola), a kind of ritornello." (The aforementioned idea of a thematic introduction to each movement was also used in Bartók's String Quartet No. 6.)

After Bartók died, his close friend Tibor Serly completed the piece in 1949. The orchestration is largely Serly’s although Bartók left frequent short-hand prompts. The concerto was premiered on December 2, 1949, by Primrose and the Minneapolis Symphony Orchestra, with Antal Doráti conducting.

The first revised critical edition, by Peter Bartók and Nelson Dellamaggiore, has restored many original Bartók features, but has not fundamentally changed the orchestration. It received world premiere in 1993. These two official editions are published by Boosey & Hawkes.

There appears to be a performance edition by Peter Bartók and Paul Neubauer in 1995. (It was revised once more by Csaba Erdélyi.) Another revision has been prepared by the violist Tabea Zimmermann.

== Form ==
The current performance editions of the viola concerto are usually divided into three movements. In the Serly's edition, the three movements are

1. Moderato
2. Adagio religioso
3. Allegro vivace

In the Peter Bartók's edition, the three movements are

1. Allegro moderato
2. Lento
3. (Finale) Allegretto

The first movement is in a loose sonata form. The second movement is significantly shorter, and closes with a very short scherzo movement with an attacca into the third movement. Bartók's manuscript gives the first movement's duration as 10’20", the second as 5’10" and the third as 4’45". The first and third movements are said to loosely contain a phrase reminiscent of the Scottish tune "Gin a Body Meet a Body, Comin' Thro' the Rye." This is probably in honor of Primrose's heritage.

== Instrumentation ==
Bartók's manuscript only specifies flute, oboe, 2 clarinets, bassoon, horns, 2 trumpets, timpani, strings.

Serly's edition is orchestrated for piccolo, 2 flutes, 2 oboes, 2 clarinets in B♭, 2 bassoons, 3 horns in F, 3 trumpets in B♭, 2 trombones, tuba, timpani, percussion and strings.

Peter Bartók's edition is orchestrated for piccolo, 2 flutes, 2 oboes (2nd doubling cor anglais), 2 clarinets in B♭, 2 bassoons (2nd doubling contrabassoon), 4 horns in F, 3 trumpets in B♭, tenor trombone, bass trombone, tuba, timpani, percussion (2), strings.

== Differences between editions ==
Peter Bartók said, "It became clear that we could not merely compare the printed score with the final manuscript prepared from my father’s sketches by Tibor Serly, and discover engraving errors, but we would have to start with the sketch itself."

The first of the note changes begins in measure 44 on beat two, where there is an added D♯ as a double stop against a D♮. In the next measure, the first beat is transposed down an octave, probably to facilitate performance. Everything remains consistent until measure 54, where Serly has the viola resting but Peter Bartók has included two measures of melody in the soloist's part. Serly's edition makes measure 67 a 6/4 bar, but Peter Bartók splits it into a 4/4 bar plus a 3/4 bar and adds a group of triplets. This trend of alterations continues as Peter Bartók adds octave displacements, and omits what is measure 74 in Serly's version.

There are some discrepancies between the different editions. Some are as simple as the metronome markings. Each editor also had very different interpretations of fingerings for the concerto. One edition suggests beginning the first movement on the open A string, while others suggest beginning on the D string. The Peter Bartók edition, especially, has interesting fingerings because Neubauer edited most of the viola part.

Many bowings also differ between different editions, some of them inserted specifically to accent certain rhythms and high notes, such as in mm. 8-10 in Serly's edition, where Primrose included some bowing suggestions to emphasize the syncopation.

Overall, there are significant surface-level discrepancies such as bowings, fingerings and dynamics. Some editions contain more changes than editor markings; in Peter Bartók's revision, measures are added, completely missing, or with note changes.

== Cello arrangement ==
Serly also arranged the work as a cello concerto. After the completion, a gathering of friends of Bartók expressed an eight-to-six preference for the cello transcription over the original. Cellist János Starker was the first to play and record the adaptation.

== Recordings ==
- Bartók, Béla. Concerto for Viola and Orchestra. Yuri Bashmet (viola), Pierre Boulez conducting Berliner Philharmoniker. Deutsche Grammophon GmbH. 2008. Compact disc.
- Béla Bartók, Concerto for Viola and Orchestra. Hong-Mei Xiao, János Kovács conducts Budapest Philharmonic Orchestra, Naxos CD 1998. (This includes both the Peter Bartók and the Tibor Serly versions).
- Béla Bartók, Concerto for Viola and Orchestra; William Primrose; Otto Klemperer conducting the Concertgebouw Orchestra; Live recording, Amsterdam, 10 January 1951; Archiphon, 1992.
- Béla Bartók, Concerto for Viola and Orchestra. Rivka Golani, soloist and Andras Ligeti conducting the Budapest Symphony Orchestra. Compact disc. Conifer CDCF-189, 1990.
- Béla Bartók, Concerto for Viola and Orchestra; Yehudi Menuhin; Antal Dorati conducting the New Philharmonia Orchestra; EMI, 1991.
- Bartók, Béla. Viola Concerto. Pinchas Zukerman. Leonard Slatkin. BMG Music. 1991. Compact disc.
- Bartók, Béla. Viola Concerto. (The Erdélyi restoration and orchestration - world premiere recording) Csaba Erdélyi. New Zealand Symphony Orchestra conducted by Marc Taddei. Concordance. 2002. Compact disc.
- Béla Bartók, Viola Concerto. Yo-Yo Ma (on a vertical viola), tracks 5-6-7 on The New York Album, Baltimore Symphony Orchestra, conducted by David Zinman, Sony Classical, 1993. Compact disc.
- Béla Bartók, Concerto for Viola and Orchestra; Kim Kashkashian; Peter Eötvös conducting the Netherlands Radio Chamber Orchestra; ECM-Records, 2000.
- James Ehnes: Bartók: Violin Concertos Nos. 1 & 2, Viola Concerto - with the BBC Philharmonic, conducted by Gianandrea Noseda

As a cello concerto:

- Bartók, Béla. Cello Concerto. János Starker; Leonard Slatkin conducting the St. Louis Symphony Orchestra; Rca Victor Red Seal, 1992.
- Bartók, Béla. Cello Concerto. Raphael Wallfisch; Gábor Takács-Nagy conducting the BBC National Orchestra of Wales; Nimbus, 2015.
