= Tabea Zimmermann =

German violist (born 1966)

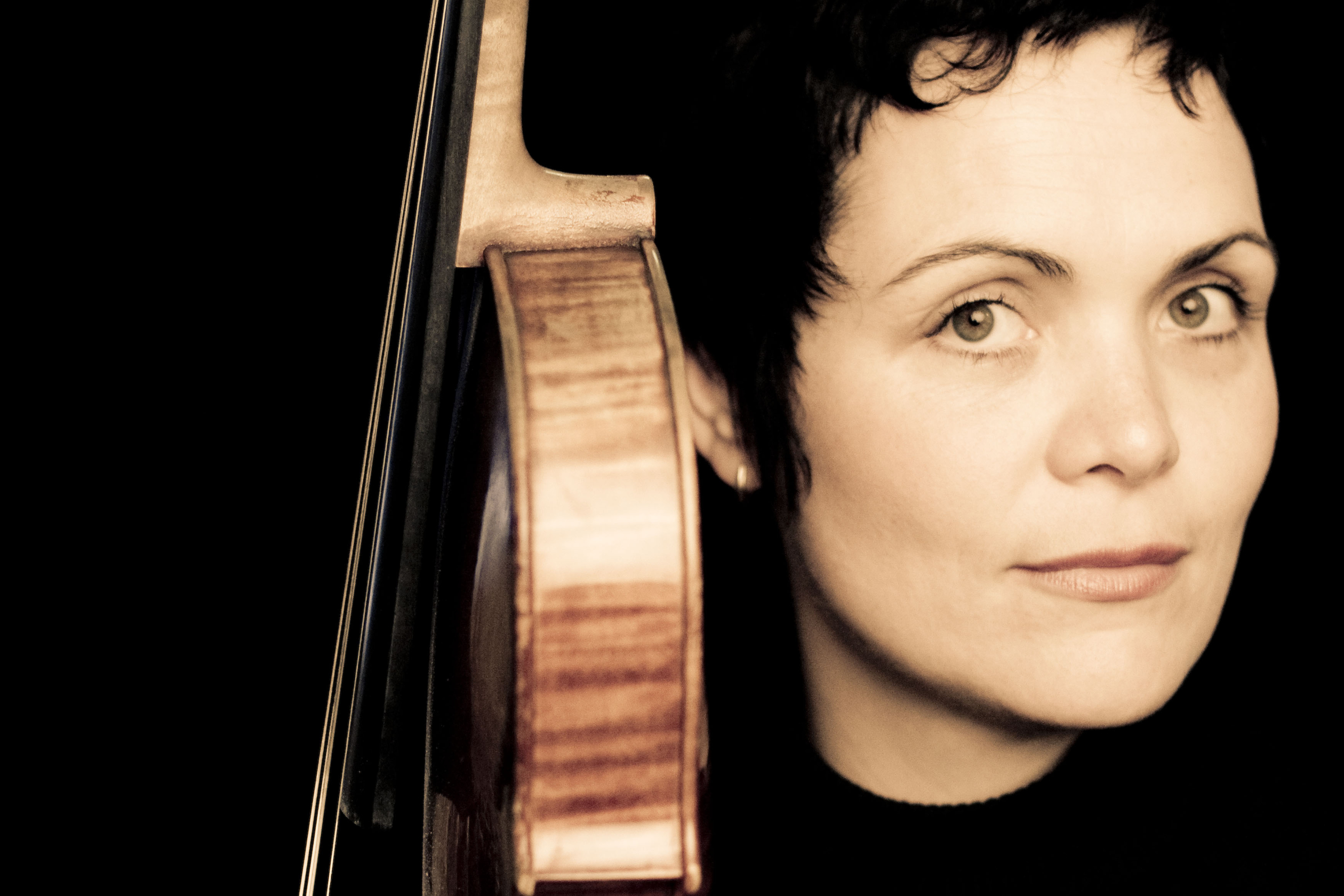
- Zimmermann in 2007
- Born: 8 October 1966 (age 60); Lahr, Baden-Württemberg, Germany
- Occupations: Classical violist; Academic teacher
- Organizations: Arcanto Quartet; Hochschule für Musik Hanns Eisler Berlin; Frankfurt University of Music and Performing Arts; Kronberg Academy
- Awards: Ernst von Siemens Music Prize
- Website: www.tabeazimmermann.de

Tabea Zimmermann (born 8 October 1966) is a German violist who has performed internationally, both as a soloist and a chamber musician. She has been artist in residence of the Concertgebouw Orchestra, the Berlin Philharmonic, and the Bavarian Radio Symphony Orchestra. In 2004, Zimmermann founded the Arcanto Quartet, a string quartet that performed until 2016. Several composers have written music for her, including György Ligeti (the Viola Sonata), and she has made her own version of Bartók's Viola Concerto from the composer's sketches.

Zimmermann is a professor at the Frankfurt University of Music and Performing Arts and gives master classes at the Kronberg Academy and elsewhere. Her awards include the 2020 Ernst von Siemens Music Prize.

== Life and career ==
Zimmermann was born in Lahr on 8 October 1966, the youngest of four children. Zimmermann began learning the viola at age three, and commenced piano studies at age five. She took lessons at the Musikschule in Lahr, where she also played in string quartet formation and in trio with her sisters.

From age 13, she studied viola with Ulrich Koch at the Freiburg Conservatory and progressed to study with Sándor Végh at the Mozarteum of Salzburg. She soon gained recognition in international competitions, winning first prizes in Geneva (1982), the Budapest International Viola Competition (1984), and the Maurice Vieux International Viola Competition in Paris (1983), for which she was awarded an instrument by contemporary luthier Étienne Vatelot (1980). Since 2019, she has been playing an instrument built for her by Patrick Robin.

As a soloist, Zimmermann has performed with major orchestras such as the Leipzig Gewandhaus Orchestra, the Berlin Philharmonic, the BBC Philharmonic, and the Orchestre de la Suisse Romande, and with conductors including Kurt Masur, Bernard Haitink, and Nikolaus Harnoncourt. In 1992 she made her debut with the Berlin Philharmonic, performing Bartók's Viola Concerto. She often performed Tibor Serly's version of the piece, but after studying the original sketches in 1994, she prepared her own version. She played her version in the final concert of the 2023 Kronberg Festival at the Casals Forum, with the Frankfurt Radio Symphony conducted by Christoph Eschenbach.

Zimmermann has been artist in residence, at the Kunstfest Weimar in 2008, in Luxembourg in 2009, in Hamburg in 2010, with the Concertgebouw Orchestra, the Berlin Philharmonic, and in the 2022/23 season the Bavarian Radio Symphony Orchestra.

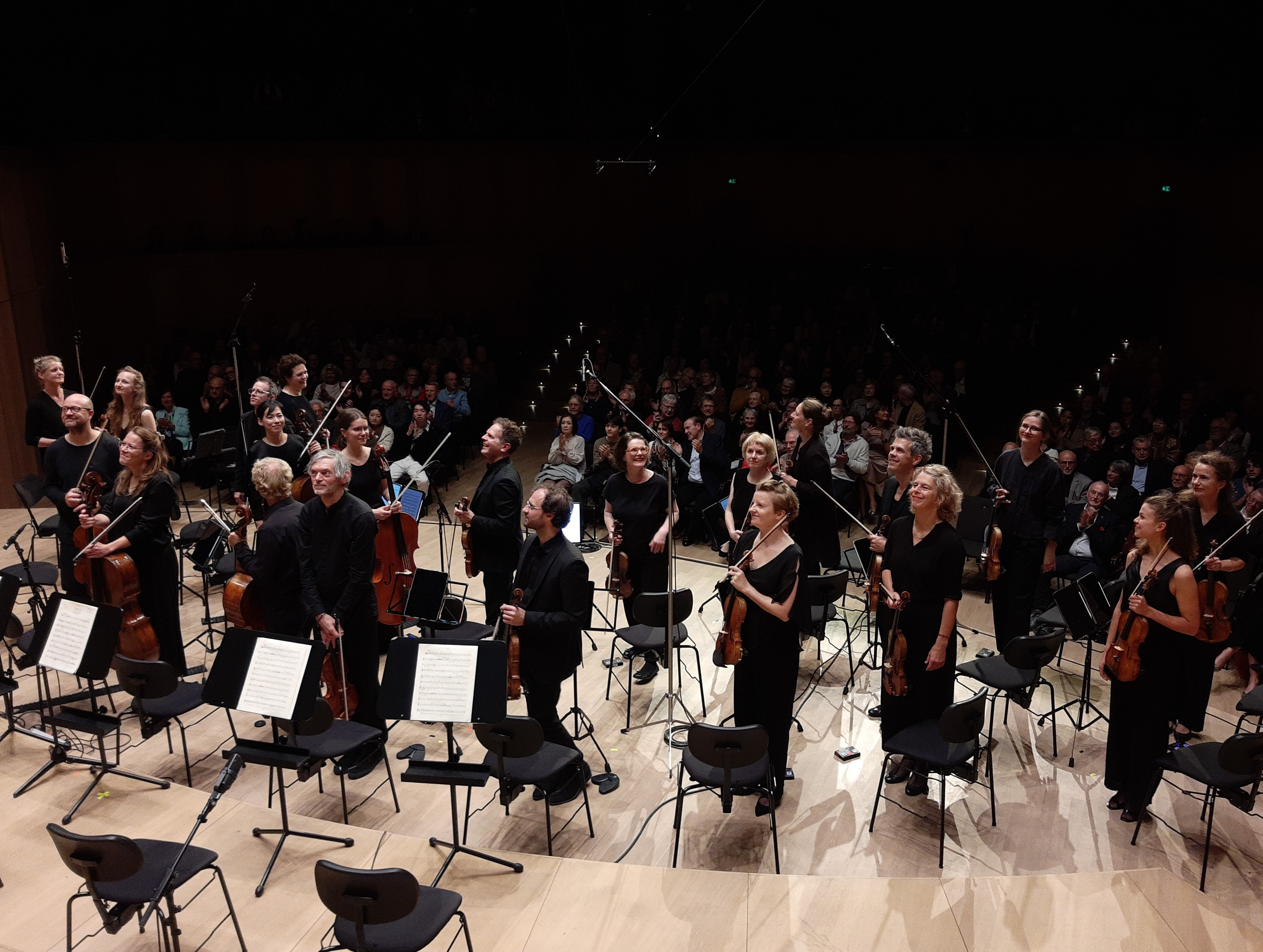
Zimmermann (center of 2nd row) after leading Bartok's Divertimento with Ensemble Resonanz, 2025

Zimmermann is also devoted to chamber music, having performed with Gidon Kremer, Lars Vogt, Hartmut Höll, Steven Isserlis, Javier Perianes, and Pamela Frank at numerous festivals. In 2004, she co-founded the Arcanto Quartet with Antje Weithaas, Daniel Sepec, and Jean-Guihen Queyras. The quartet played together until 2016. She has also collaborated with the Ensemble Resonanz.

Committed to 20th- and 21st-century repertoire, Zimmermann premiered Ligeti's Viola Sonata, which was written for her, on 23 April 1994 in Gütersloh. Other works written for her include Heinz Holliger's Recicanto for viola and orchestra, Wolfgang Rihm's Viola Concerto No. 2 "Über die Linie IV", Monhby Georges Lentz, Frank Michael Beyer's Notte di pasqua and Bruno Mantovani's Concerto for Two Violas that she played with Antoine Tamestit. Sally Beamish, Enno Poppe, and Josef Tal also wrote music for her.

=== Teaching ===
Zimmermann was on the faculty of the Saarbrücken Music Academy from 1987 to 1989, then the youngest female professor in Germany, and taught at the Frankfurt University of Music and Performing Arts from 1994 to 2002. She then became professor of viola and chamber music at the Hochschule für Musik Hanns Eisler Berlin until 2023, where Antoine Tamestit was one of her students. Other students of hers include Amihai Grosz and Pauline Sachse. As of 2023, Zimmermann is again a professor of viola and chamber music in Frankfurt. She gives masterclasses at the Kronberg Academy.

=== Other activities ===
Zimmermann chairs the Foundation Board of the Ernst von Siemens Foundation. She was president of the Hindemith Foundation, based in Blonay, Switzerland, and has chaired the Bonn Beethoven House since 2013.

== Personal life ==
Zimmermann was married to the conductor David Shallon until his death in 2000; they had two sons. Her second husband is the American conductor Steven Sloane; they have a daughter.

== Awards ==
Zimmermann has won numerous national and international awards, including the Ernst von Siemens Music Prize, the Frankfurter Musikpreis, the Hessian Cultural Prize, the Rheingau Musik Preis, the Hindemith Prize of the City of Hanau, the International Classical Music Awards (ICMA) 2017, and the International Prize of the Chigiana Music Academy of Siena. She received the Officer's Cross of the Order of Merit of the Federal Republic of Germany in 2018. With the prize money of €250.000 from the Ernst von Siemens Music Prize, Zimmermann founded the David Shallon Foundation.

== Recordings ==
- Ensemble Resonanz, Poppe: Filz
- Jewish chamber music
- Tabea Zimmermann – Solo
- Tabea Zimmermann – Solo II
- Tabea Zimmermann : BR 4 : 28.02.1994
- Tabea Zimmermann, Bavarian Radio Symphony Orchestra – Hartmann, Britten, Schostakowitsch
- Walton, Strauss, Bartók: Iván Fischer, BRSO
- Christoph Poppen, Yuri Bashmet, Viola-Fest 2003 – Kronberg Academy
- Bach: The Brandenburg Project / Twelve concertos, Håkan Hardenberger, Pekka Kuusisto, Antje Weithaas, Thomas Dausgaard, Swedish Chamber Orchestra
- Rihm: Sphäre nach Studie, Christian Gerhaher, Bavarian Radio Symphony Orchestra
- Berlioz: Harold en Italie, Stéphane Degout, François-Xavier Roth, Les Siècles
- Javier Perianes, Cantilena
- Schubert: Forellenquintett, Mozart: Piano Quartet in G minor, Alfred Brendel, Thomas Zehetmair
- Mayer: Song of the Reeds
- Brahms: Viola Sonatas, Vol. 1, Kirill Gerstein, Rebecca Clarke
- Brahms: Viola Sonatas, Vol. 2, Kirill Gerstein, Rebecca Clarke
- Romance oubliée
- Richard Strauss: Don Quixote, Till Eulenspiegel's Merry Pranks, Jean-Guihen Queyras, François-Xavier Roth, Gürzenich Orchestra Cologne
- Brahms: String Sextets, Jean-Guihen Queyras, Belcea Quartet
- Michael Jarrell: Émergences-résurgences, 4 Eindrücke, ...Le ciel, tout à l'heure encore si limpide..., Renaud Capuçon, Pascal Rophé, Orchestre national des Pays de la Loire
- Mozart: Sinfonia concertante, K. 364, Frank Peter Zimmermann, Gianluigi Gelmetti, SWR Symphony Orchestra,
- Ligeti: Works, Esa-Pekka Salonen, Marie-Luise Neunecker
- Gubaidulina: Offertorium, Gidon Kremer, Isabelle van Keulen, Charles Dutoit, Boston Symphony Orchestra
- Ives: Concord Sonata, Songs, Pierre-Laurent Aimard, Susan Graham, Emmanuel Pahud
- Mantovani: Concerto pour deux altos, Time Stretch, Finale, Antoine Tamestit, Pascal Rophé, Orchestre Philharmonique de Liège
- Widmann: Es war einmal, Märchenerzählungen
- Arcanto Quartet, Schubert: String Quintet, Op. 163
- Arcanto Quartet, Debussy, Dutilleux, Ravel: Quatuors à cordes
- Haydn: Piano Trio, Hob. XV:2, Lars Vogt, Antje Weithaas
- Richard Strauss: Don Quixote, Mischa Maisky, Zubin Mehta, Berlin Philharmonic
- Hindemith: Mathis der Maler, Herbert von Karajan, David Shallon, Berlin Philharmonic
- Hindemith: Viola & Orchestra, Hans Graf, Deutsches Symphonie-Orchester Berlin
- Hindemith: Viola Sonatas and Viola Solo, Thomas Hoppe
