= Geneva International Music Competition =

Organization and music competition

The Geneva International Music Competition (French: Concours international d'exécution musicale de Genève) is one of the world's leading international music competitions, founded in 1939. In 1957, it was one of the founding members of the World Federation of International Music Competition (WFIMC), whose headquarters are in Geneva.

Today, the Geneva Competition alternates between several main disciplines: piano, flute, oboe, clarinet, cello, viola, string quartet, voice and percussion. Every second year, it offers a Composition Prize. Upcoming competitions are cello & oboe (2021), piano & composition (2022), flute & string quartet (2023) and voice & composition (2024).

Its prizewinners include world-famous artists such as Martha Argerich, Arturo Benedetti-Michelangeli, Victoria de los Ángeles, Alan Gilbert, Nelson Goerner, Friedrich Gulda, Heinz Holliger, Nobuko Imai, Melos Quartet, Emmanuel Pahud, Maurizio Pollini, Georg Solti, José van Dam, Christian Zacharias and Tabea Zimmermann.

In addition to its official prizes, the Geneva International Music Competition offers a career development programme, which provides precious support and advice to help boost laureates' careers. This programme includes two years of concert management, as well as CD recordings, international tours, a festival and professional workshops.

== 1st prize winners ==
- 1939 Clarinet Robert Gugolz Switzerland
- 1939 Piano Arturo Benedetti Michelangeli Italy
- 1939 Voice Maria Stader, Hungary
- 1942 Piano Georg Solti Hungary
- 1947 Clarinet Henri Druart France
- 1948 Piano Charles Reiner Hungary
- 1949 Piano Maria Tipo Italy
- 1950 Clarinet Paul-Jacques Lambert France
- 1953 Piano Jacques Klein Brazil
- 1954 Voice Pamela Bowden United Kingdom
- 1957 Clarinet Petko Radev Bulgaria
- 1957 Piano Dominique Merlet France (ex aequo)
- 1957 Piano Martha Argerich Argentina (ex aequo)
- 1957 Voice James Milligan Canada
- 1959 Oboe Heinz Holliger Switzerland
- 1960 Clarinet Peter Rieckhoff West Germany
- 1961 Piano Désiré N'Kaoua France
- 1961 Flute Michel Debost France
- 1962 Organ Joachim Grubich Poland
- 1971 Cello Myung-wha Chung South Korea
- 1972 Clarinet Thomas Friedli Switzerland
- 1972 Viola Atar Arad Israel
- 1972 Voice Konstantin Ploujnikov Soviet Union
- 1973 Double Bass Ivan Kotov Soviet Union
- 1973 Flute Toshiko Kohno Japan
- 1973 Quartet Quatuor Kreuzberger West Germany
- 1973 Trombone Anatole Skobelev Soviet Union
- 1974 Harp Olga Ortenberg Soviet Union
- 1974 Voice Gary Kendall United States
- 1975 Guitar Dusan Bogdanovic Yugoslavia
- 1976 Piano Tatiana Chebanova Soviet Union
- 1976 Voice Katherine Ciesinski United States
- 1977 Oboe Jean-Christophe Gayot France
- 1977 Viola AnaBela Chaves Portugal
- 1977 Voice Kristine Ciesinski United States
- 1978 Voice Margareta Haverinen Finland
- 1979 Voice Jean Christian France
- 1980 Bassoon Gilbert Audin France
- 1980 Vocal Quartet New York Vocal Ensemble United States
- 1982 Percussion Peter Sadlo West Germany
- 1982 Piano Evgeny Krouchevsky Soviet Union
- 1982 Viola Tabea Zimmermann West Germany
- 1983 Bass Nico Abondolo United States
- 1983 Voice Juliana Gondek United States
- 1984 Conducting Grzegorz Nowak Poland
- 1985 Organ Jonathan Biggers United States
- 1985 Voice Chihiro Bamba Japan
- 1986 Cello Leonid Gorokhov Soviet Union
- 1987 Bassoon Anders EngströmSweden
- 1987 Trumpet Ole Edvard Antonsen Norway
- 1987 Viola Hong-Mei Xiao China
- 1987 Voice Maria Diaconu Romania
- 1988 Guitar Viktor Vidović Yugoslavia
- 1988 Oboe Alex Klein Brazil
- 1988 Trombone Jonas Bylund Sweden
- 1990 Clarinet Fabio Di-Casola Switzerland
- 1990 Piano Nelson Goerner Argentina
- 1990 Violin Zheng-Rong Wang China
- 1991 Cello Wenn-Sinn Yang Switzerland
- 1991 Tuba Jens Bjørn-Larsen Denmark
- 1992 Flute Emmanuel Pahud Switzerland
- 1993 Organ: Alessio Corti Italy
- 1993 Violin Manara Francesco Italy
- 1993 Voice: Jane Irwin United Kingdom
- 1994 Conducting: Alan Gilbert United States
- 1995 Bassoon: Laurent Lefèvre France
- 1995 Cello: Claudio Bohorquez Germany
- 1995 Guitar: Georgi Vassiliev Bulgaria
- 1996 Trumpet: André Henry France
- 1997 Clarinet: Martin Fröst Sweden
- 1998 Double Bass: Janusz Widzyk Poland
- 1998 Oboe: Alexei Ogrintchouk Russia
- 2000 Cello: Rafael Rosenfeld Switzerland
- 2000 Voice: Annette Dasch Germany (ex aequo)
- 2000 Voice: Werner Erik Nelson United States (ex aequo)
- 2001 Flute: Silvia Careddu Italy
- 2001 Piano: Roland Krüger Germany
- 2001 Quartet: Quatuor Terpsycordes Switzerland
- 2002 Percussion: Aiyun Huang Canada
- 2002 Piano: Sergey Koudriakov Russia
- 2005 Viola: Ryszard Groblewski Poland
- 2008 Cello: István Várdai Hungary
- 2009 Voice: Polina Pasztircsák Hungary
- 2010 Piano: Mami Hagiwara Japan
- 2011 Composition: Artur Akshelyan Armenia
- 2011 Quartet: Artemis Quartet Germany (ex aequo)
- 2011 Quartet: Hermès Quartet France (ex aequo)
- 2012 Piano: Lorenzo Soulès France
- 2013 Composition: Kwang Ho Cho South Korea
- 2014 Piano: Ji-Yeong Mun South Korea
- 2015 Composition: Shoichi Yabuta Japan
- 2016 Quartet: Vision String Quartet Germany
- 2017 Composition: Jaehyuck Choi South Korea
- 2018 Clarinet: Kevin Spagnolo Italy
- 2018 Piano: Théo Fouchenneret France (ex aequo)
- 2018 Piano: Dmitry Shishkin Russia (ex aequo)
- 2019 Composition: Daniel Arango-Prada Colombia (ex aequo)
- 2019 Composition: Hinako Takagi Japan (ex aequo)
- 2019 Percussion: Hyeji Bak South Korea
- 2021 Cello: Michiaki Ueno Japan
- 2022 Piano: Kevin Chen Canada
- 2022 Composition: Shin Kim South Korea
- 2023 String Quartet: NOVO Quartet Denmark
- 2023 Flute: Ivanova Elizaveta Russia
- 2024 Composition: Léo Albisetti Switzerland
- 2024 Composition: Caio de Azevedo Brazil
- 2024 Voice: Chelsea Marilyn Zurflüh Switzerland
- 2025 Viola: Sarah Strohm Switzerland
- 2025 Alto(sic): Brian Isaacs United States

Search all prizewinners from 1939

== Previous Disciplines ==
1995 and before, the competition also included a prize for Bassoon.

== See also ==
- Category:Winners of the Geneva International Music Competition
