= Viola Sonata No. 1 (Hindemith) =

Sonata by Paul Hindemith

- by Paul Hindemith
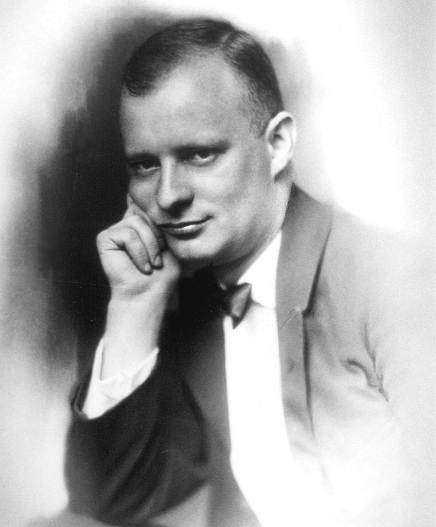
- The composer in 1923
- Opus: 11, No. 4
- Composed: 1919
- Movements: three (without break)

The first Sonata for viola and piano (German: Sonate für Bratsche und Klavier), also known as Sonata in F, Op. 11, No. 4, by Paul Hindemith was composed in 1919. It is the fourth of five instrumental sonatas comprising his opus 11. This sonata and the following Op. 11 No. 5 for solo viola mark Hindemith's decision to abandon playing the violin in favor of its larger cousin.

A typical performance lasts between 15 and 18 minutes.

== Movements ==
The sonata is in three movements, which are played without a break:

1. Fantasie
2. Thema mit Variationen
3. Finale (mit Variationen)

=== I. Fantasie ===
Ruhig – Sehr Breit – Im Zeitmaß – Breit

At about three minutes in length, this is the shortest of the movements, and also the freest in form and harmonic exploration, passing through roughly ten keys in the space of 41 measures. The viola introduces the main theme of the sonata in the key of F, over hushed piano accompaniment; the piano soon picks up this melody and the two instruments begin to develop a rhythmic figure that serves as a sort of coda to the theme. The piano then falls back to a subsidiary role with shimmering thirty-second note accompaniment, while the theme builds in the viola to a powerful, C-major cadenza. The music picks up again quietly in E minor on the piano, as the viola plays a decorative rhythmic figure. The theme returns quickly and is passed between the instruments in a show of virtuosity for the soloist. After a final, powerful statement, the music comes to rest in D; the piano attempts to stray to the minor mode with G-minor chords and F♮s, but the viola insists on rising to an F♯. Alone now, the viola rises by whole steps to A♯, which is sustained enharmonically to B♭ as the beginning of the next movement.

=== II. Thema mit Variationen ===
Ruhig und einfach, wie ein Volkslied

- Var. I Dasselbe Zeitmaß
- Var. II ein wenig kapriziös
- Var. III Lebhafter und sehr fließend
- Var. IV noch lebhafter

The theme of the second movement is, as the marking suggests, a simple, folkish tune introduced in E♭ minor by the viola. The theme is notable for bearing a time signature of both 2/4 and 3/4; Hindemith finds this a convenient solution for notating phrases of different lengths without resorting to abolishing bar lines or notating time signature changes nearly every bar. Variation III and the third movement also make extensive use of this technique.

The variations proceed as follows: Variation I is in 6/8 time, with the melody, now in E♭ minor reduced to notes of equal length, played in a contrapuntal overlap by the piano and viola. Variation II returns to 2/4, and is a spry, rhythmic rendition of the theme in the viola over an accompaniment of staccato thirds and sixths. Variation III is lyrical and sweeping, in the key of E♭. Long lines in the viola contrast a moto perpetuo accompaniment of sixteenth and thirty-second notes in the piano. Variation IV reaches a climax, with an ostinato accompaniment providing the grounding for the off-kilter rhythmic setting of the theme. Hindemith introduces a non-traditional key signature (G♯ and F♯ only) that sets the music in a whole-tone mode; while the viola does occasionally play runs and phrases with half-steps, the piano persists in the figure G♯–F♯–E–D, over which the viola builds towards a climax in C♯ minor, which is the first note of the third movement.

=== II. Finale (mit Variationen) ===
- Sehr lebhaft – Breit – Leicht fließend
- Var. V Ruhig fließend
- Sehr lebhaft
- Var. VI Fugato, mit bizarrer Plumpheit vorzutragen
- Im Hauptzeitmaß – Wie vorhin leicht fließend – Ruhig fließend
- Var. VII Coda
- Wild – Noch mehr treiben – Breiter

This movement is the apotheosis of Hindemith's mastery of classical forms. It functions both as an unusual set of variations, as its name suggests, and as a full-fledged sonata-allegro movement. As indicated by the continuation of variations numbers from the previous movement, the theme being varied is the one from that movement, which functions as the second theme in Sonata-Allegro terminology. The first theme, introduced immediately at the beginning of the movement, is the very distinctive figure of a turn followed by an ascending scale. This figure is played and elaborated on by the soloist, with the pianist providing tonicizing changes of harmony at each instance of the turn figure. The viola then transforms this figure into the beginning of a more lyrical theme, which brings the music down in tempo and dynamic level. The main theme returns momentarily, only to falter and give way to a new quiet theme which is a continuance of the rhythmic developments made by the first softer section. This theme, quick downward steps followed by a gentle Mannheim rocket and another set of descending steps, may easily be mistaken for a second theme, when in fact it is an extension and transformation of the movement's opening gesture.

The music comes completely to rest before the viola re-introduces the second movement theme in Variation 5. After a simple statement of the theme, the piano and viola engage in call-and-response on a theme derived from the rhythm of the second movement's first variation. After some varied tonal wanderings, there is a strong buildup of dominant-preparation for A♭ major, in which key the piano restates the folk song theme while the viola plays the rhythmic coda-variant as a sort of counter-subject, creating a brilliant and beautiful synthesis. This leads into a headlong acceleration, with running eighth notes in the piano set against off-beat tied notes in the viola. The soloist recaps the second movement theme in its original form, albeit at a breakneck speed, and this leads back into the opening theme of the movement, now in E major. This security quickly dies away in harmonic ambiguity, leaving two beats of non-tonic silence in which to begin the next variation.

The fugal treatment of the theme in Variation VI fastidiously avoids functional tonal harmony that the ear can follow. The contour of the melody is made to outline a diminished triad rather than the accustomed major triad, and the accompaniment consists of clunking, harmonically unrelated dominant seventh chords missing their fifth degrees, very much lending the music to the composer's direction of 'bizarre and clumsy'. By the pianist's entrance, the viola has taken the coda figure, much in the same form as in previous sections, and transformed it into the fugue's counter-subject. The texture remains thin throughout, but the music increases in volume as the pianist adds octaves to both hands and the violist contributes two- and three-note pizzicati, giving strong but unexpected tonicization for E♭ minor, in which key occurs the sonata's recapitulation. This section is a transposed and compressed repetition of the opening, which skips the development of the first theme into the impostor second theme, jumping straight into the latter. This section is also repeated almost note-for-note. The viola falls silent when the piano re-introduces the second-movement theme, entering in what was previously the accompaniment's role of playing the coda-figure. Where before the instruments traded this figure back and forth, now the viola retains it exclusively as the piano builds to an identical climax and plays the second movement theme, accompanied as before by the coda-figure in the viola. The instruments again accelerate into a statement of the second-movement theme in the viola, and into a seemingly-familiar arrival at the third-movement theme. Now, however, the piano abandons solid tonic triads in favor of a more leading dominant seventh chord, and both instruments rush upward to a climax followed by a downward harmonic minor scale in unison, which transforms into the ostinato from the end of the second movement, seemingly leading to a similar, crashing climax.

After the pounding whole-tone ostinato of the previous measures, the hushed repetition of the second movement theme in E♭ minor is supremely unexpected. The piano plays off-beat chords, then a counter-melody whose harmonies move in quick circle-of-fifths and enharmonic progression. After a few small experiments with rhythmic displacement of the theme, the viola begins a figure of ascending triplets while the piano recapitulates exactly (albeit in a different key and with textural changes) the climax of the Theme section of Movement II. At the marking 'Wild', the piano takes up the triplet figure and the viola plays off-beat eight notes, which seem to gradually transform into dotted eighths followed by a sixteenth, then into a single eight followed by two sixteenths, while the piano now comes into a broad statement of the second movement theme in E♭ minor. The final bars make use of this theme in a variety of rhythms, eventually distilling it down to one, powerful phrase. The piano emphasizes E♭ major but the flat sixth of the theme pulls towards minor, and its final statement, in unison between the viola and triple double octaves in the piano, is modally ambiguous, though unquestionably triumphant.

== See also ==
- Viola sonata
