= Kristine Ciesinski =

American operatic soprano (1952–2018)

Kristine Ciesinski (July 5, 1952 – June 9, 2018) was an American operatic soprano who had an active international career from the late 1970s through the 2000s. She was a resident artist for many years with Theater Bremen, Germany, and was a regular singer in London opera houses during the 1980s and 1990s. She was best known for her role in the English National Opera's 1990 production of Verdi’s Macbeth. In the latter part of her musical career, Ciesinski taught singing more than she performed. In her later years, she took up gliding and was a pilot/instructor at Teton Aviation. Ciesinski died in a glider crash in the mountains of Wyoming on June 9, 2018.

== Life and career ==
Born in Newark, Delaware, Ciesinski studied opera at Boston University and the Guildhall School of Music and Drama. She made her professional opera debut in 1975 as Pamina in Mozart's The Magic Flute with the Washington Civic Opera (WCO) and conductor Richard Wylenmann leading the National Symphony Orchestra. Other early roles with the WCO included Marenka in Smetana's The Bartered Bride and Fiordiligi in Mozart's Così fan tutte. That same year she performed the role of Cio-Cio San in Madama Butterfly with the Chesapeake Opera, a company she performed regularly with through 1985. In 1976 she performed the role of the Countess in Richard Strauss's Capriccio with the Central City Opera. In 1977 she won the Geneva International Music Competition. She was a resident artist at the Salzburger Landestheater from 1979 to 1981. In 1985 she joined the roster of resident artists at Theater Bremen, Germany, where she remained for over a decade as a leading dramatic soprano. She made her debut with the Scottish Opera in 1985 as Donna Anna in Mozart's Don Giovanni, and appeared the following year with Opera North as Cassandra in Berlioz's Les Troyens. She performed the latter role for her debut with the Welsh National Opera in 1987.

In 1989 Ciesinski made her debut at the English National Opera (ENO) as Ann Maurrant in Kurt Weill’s Street Scene. She returned to the ENO multiple times over succeeding decade. In 1990 she had a major success as Lady Macbeth in Verdi's Macbeth at the ENO, later repeating the role on tour to the USSR with the company. Other roles she performed at the ENO included Marie in Alban Berg's Wozzeck and the title role in Richard Strauss's Salome among others. In 1988 and 1999 she appeared in San Francisco Opera's production of the Ring cycle as Gerhilde in Die Walküre and the Third Norn and Gutrune in Götterdämmerung. She retired from performance in 2007, with her last appearance at the Teatro Regio in Turin, Italy, as Ariane in Paul Dukas's Ariane et Barbe-bleue.

Other opera companies Ciesinski performed with during her career included the Baltimore Opera Company, the Bavarian State Opera, the Dutch National Opera, the Hamburg State Opera, La Monnaie, La Scala, Milwaukee Opera Theatre, Opera Delaware, Oper Frankfurt, and the San Diego Opera among others. Her repertoire included Countess Almaviva in Mozart's The Marriage of Figaro, Donna Elvira in Don Giovanni, Emilia Marty in Janáček's The Makropulos Affair, Eva in Wagner's Die Meistersinger von Nürnberg, Judith in Bartók's Bluebeard's Castle, Katerina in Shostakovich's Lady Macbeth of Mtsensk, Leonore in Beethoven's Fidelio, Marguerite in Gounod's Faust, Roxanne in Szymanowski's King Roger, Senta in Wagner's The Flying Dutchman, and the title roles in Gluck's Iphigénie en Tauride, Catalani's La Wally, Puccini's Manon Lescaut, and Cherubini's Médée.

Kristine's older sister, Katherine Ciesinski (born 1950), is also an opera singer. In 1996, the Ciesinski sisters appeared as themselves in the film Poussières d'amour (Love's Debris), directed by Kristine Ciesinski's frequent opera collaborator, Werner Schroeter. Kristine made her home in Idaho with her husband, the British bass-baritone Norman Bailey.

In addition to singing opera, Ciesinski was a passionate glider pilot and instructor. She died in a glider pilot crash in Grand Teton National Park in 2018.
