= Hinako Murakami =

Japanese association football player (born 2000)

Personal information
- Date of birth: 16 February 2000 (age 26)
- Place of birth: Miyazaki Prefecture, Japan
- Height: 1.57 m (5 ft 2 in)
- Position: Forward

Team information
- Current team: AC Nagano Parceiro
- Number: 20

Senior career*
| Years | Team | Apps | (Gls) |
- AC Nagano Parceiro
- * Club domestic league appearances and goals

Hinako Murakami (born 16 February 2000) is a Japanese professional footballer who plays as a forward for WE League club AC Nagano Parceiro.

== Club career ==
Murakami made her WE League debut on 26 September 2021.
