= Hinako Takagi =

Japanese composer (born 1989)

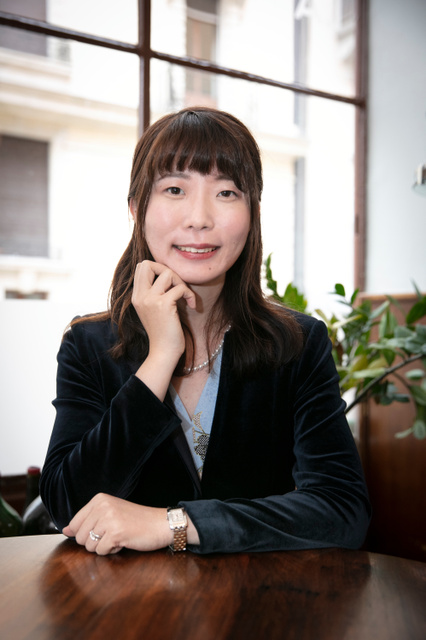
- At the Geneva International Music Competition, 2019
- Born: Yamasaki, Hyōgo Prefecture, Japan (now Shisō, Hyōgo Prefecture, Japan)
- Occupation: Composer
- Website: Hinako Takagi Official Website

Hinako Takagi (born 1989) is a Japanese composer and pianist. She is a lecturer in composition at the Osaka College of Music. In 2019, she became the second Japanese to win first prize in the composition category of the Geneva International Music Competition. Her award-winning work "L'instant" was selected as a task piece in the oboe section of the same competition held in 2021.

== Biography ==
Takagi was born and raised in Hyogo, Japan. In junior high, she was asked to compose a song for her class for a school event. The experience inspired her to be interested in music composition. She majored in piano in high school, and enrolled in composition major in university.

In her freshman year, she received an assignment from her teacher, Yoko Kubo, to compose "100 variations of the same piece in one year." She later said that she learned the basics of composition from this assignment.

She studied composition with Yoko Kubo and Allain Gaussin. In 2012 she was appointed as a lecturer at Osaka College of Music in Osaka, Japan.

As a music genre that one may find difficult to listen to, Takagi wants to turn contemporary music into something more familiar for everyone and find a balance between academic music theory and popularity. She has organized many small concerts with new musical arrangements to engage people's interest in contemporary music. In 2019, she composed a pantonality song called "My owner is a smartphone addict", which talks about the story of a cat named "Gorota", and his owner who is addicted to smartphone and is not interested in playing with him. From the viewpoint of the cat and the modern vocabularies used in the lyrics, the song illustrates the various issues in modern communication.

She is a fan of Takarazuka Revue. Her piece "Revue!" was inspired by the Takarazuka Revue.

== Performances ==
In 2019, she won First Prize in the composition category of the Geneva International Music Competition a gateway for young musicians. Her award-winning work "L'instant" was selected as a task piece in the oboe section of the same competition held in 2021.

"L'instant" means "moment" in French, and was inspired by the famous painting "Candle" from the Japanese painter Yajuro Takashima. In this work, the "mystery" and "impression" of the ancient Greeks fire were revived and expressed through modern music.

In June 2020, "Lost in ______" for flute solo was selected in the open call for works of PROJECT21st Masterclass (Hong Kong). This work is based on the motif of modern people under the COVID-19 situation, and will be performed in Hong Kong in the summer of 2022 by Italian flute player Mario Caroli.

In September 2020, "Messenger: 4 Studies of Clouds", with the theme of "cloud", was premiered at the recital (Osaka) of Takeshi Hidaka, the chief guest horn player of the Japan Century Symphony Orchestra.

In October 2020, she wrote and composed the school song for "Shonai Sakura Gakuen," which is scheduled to open in Toyonaka City, Osaka Prefecture. In this work, the desire to "support the children who will open up the future" and the desire to "remember the school that is no longer integrated" are included.

On October 31, 2020, her piece "Revue!" was performed by percussionist Marianna Bednarska and pianist Lorenzo Soulés in the "Weekend des Lauréats du Concours de Genève" at the 2020 Geneva International Music Competition.

== Awards ==
- 3rd place (Composition Division), 86th Japan Music Competition 2017 (winning work "Atmospheric circulation" for string quartet and prepared piano)
- 1st place (Composition), Geneva International Music Competition 2019 (winning work "L'instant")
- Winner, PROJECT21st Masterclass and Concert Series (MaCS) Call-for-Score (Composition for Flute), Hong Kong
- Sakuya Konohana Award (Music), Japan, 2020
- Cultural Future Encouragement Award, Amagasaki City, Japan, 2020
- Recognition award from the Commissioner for Cultural Affairs Japan (International Arts Division), 2021
