= Katherine Ciesinski =

American opera singer

Katherine Ciesinski (born October 13, 1950) is an American mezzo-soprano, stage director, and voice professor.

Ciesinski was born to Delaware Sports Hall of Famer Roman Ciesinski and Katherine Hansen Ciesinski. She is the sister of opera singer Kristine Ciesinski (1952-2018). Her early studies in piano and voice were locally in Delaware, then at Temple University and the Curtis Institute of Music with Margaret Harshaw and Dino Yannopoulos. In 1974, she won the Gramma Fischer Award at the Metropolitan Opera National Council Auditions and the following year, the WGN Auditions of the Air. In 1977, she took first prize at the Concours International de Chant de Paris by unanimous decision of the jury, while a year earlier having won first prize at the Geneva International Music Competition. Her sister Kristine won the same prize the following year at the same competition.

== Opera ==
Her professional orchestra debut was at 16, but her first professional operatic successes came at the Festival d'Aix-en-Provence in 1976 in La traviata and her first notable American performances were at the Spoleto Festival USA in 1978 as Erika in Samuel Barber's Vanessa, one of the first operas broadcast by the Great Performances series. She has performed as a guest artist at the Metropolitan Opera, at Covent Garden, with Scottish Opera, and with the Paris, San Francisco, Brussels, Canadian, Santa Fe, Frankfurt, Dallas, Houston Grand, Stuttgart, St. Louis, and Chicago Lyric Operas. She performed Countess Geschwitz in the American premiere of the completed three-act version of Lulu at Santa Fe Opera. She also portrayed the role of Cecilia March in the world premiere of Mark Adamo's Little Women with the Houston Grand Opera. Her recording with the Houston Symphony of Alban Berg's Wozzeck won the Grammy Award for Best Opera in 2018.

== Concerts and recitals ==
Ciesinski has also performed with many of the world's leading orchestras, including the Cleveland, Minnesota, and Philadelphia Orchestras, the Symphonies of Chicago, Boston, San Francisco, Houston and Toronto; and in Europe, with the Berlin and Vienna Philharmonics, L'Orchestre de Paris, the London Symphony Orchestra, the Dresden Staatskapelle, and L'Orchestre de la Suisse Romande. She has been heard in recital across the United States and in Paris, Cologne, Zurich, Milan and at the Aix-en-Provence, Geneva, Spoleto and Salzburg Festivals. Her contemporary chamber music activities have included performances at the Caramoor Festival, New York; Musica Festival, Strasbourg; Ars Musica Festival, Brussels; Festival d'Automne, Paris; Voix Nouvelles, Fondation Royaumont; and with the Ensemble InterContemporain in Paris.

== Teaching ==
One of the few master performers to also become a master teacher, her visiting lectures and master classes have taken her to conservatories and universities across the United States, Mexico, and Europe and she remains an active clinician and judge for the Metropolitan Opera Regional Council auditions. Ciesinski is an alumni fellow of Temple University and holds a Certificate of Honor from the same institution. She is also a member of Pi Kappa Lambda as well as Phi Beta Delta, and the only American ever to be invited to sit on the French National Conservatory's Voice Teacher Certification Jury. She appears in Baker's Biographical Dictionary of Musicians, the New Grove Dictionary of Opera, and the La Scala Encyclopedia of the Opera. She makes her home in Rochester, New York with the American conductor Mark Powell and is the Martin E. and Corazon D. Sanders Professor of Voice at the Eastman School of Music.

== Selected recordings ==
- 1975: Columbia, Ravel: Chansons madécasses (Marlboro Music Festival)
- 1979: Radio France, Gounod: Sapho (Sylvan Cambreling) live recording
- 1981: RCA, Handel: Messiah (Richard Westenburg, Musica Sacra) first digital Messiah recording
- 1982: CRI, Rorem: Women's Voices world premiere recording
- 1983: Erato, Dukas: Ariane et Barbe-bleue (Armin Jordan), Gran Prix du Disc, 1984 world premiere recording
- 1986: Erato, Prokofiev: War and Peace (Mstislav Rostropovich)
- 1991: Decca, Blitzstein: Regina (John Mauceri, Scottish Opera Orchestra)
- 1991: BMG, Tchaikovsky: The Queen of Spades (Seiji Ozawa, Boston Symphony Orchestra) Grammy Award Nominee, 1992
- 1997: London/Decca, Wagner: Die Walküre (Christoph von Dohnányi, Cleveland Orchestra)
- 1999: Nonesuch, Weill: Die Bürgschaft (Julius Rudel, Spoleto Festival Orchestra)
- 2018: Naxos, Berg: Wozzeck (Hans Graf, Houston Symphony)
