= County Hall, Ruthin =

County Building in Ruthin, Wales

County Hall
- Neuadd y Sir Rhuthun (Welsh)
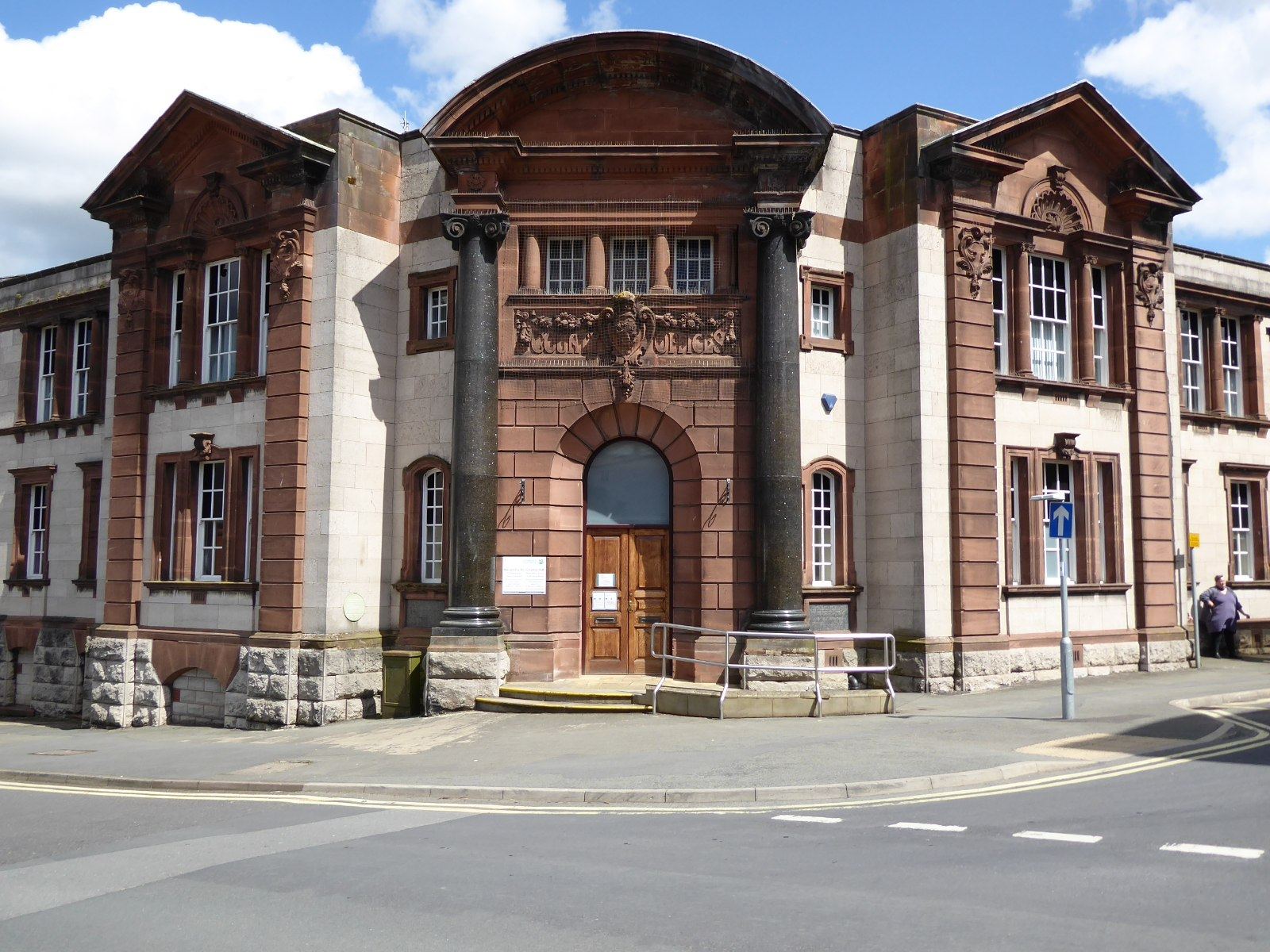
- County Hall

- Shown in Denbighshire
- 53.1150°N 3.3087°W
- Location: Wynnstay Road, Ruthin

History
- Built: 1909

Site notes
- Architect: Walter Douglas Wiles
- Architectural style: Neoclassical style

County Hall (Welsh: Neuadd y Sir Rhuthun) is a municipal building in Wynnstay Road, Ruthin, Denbighshire, Wales. The structure is the headquarters of Denbighshire County Council.

== History ==
The first public building in the town was the old court house in St Peter's Square which, in its current incarnation, dated back to 1421.

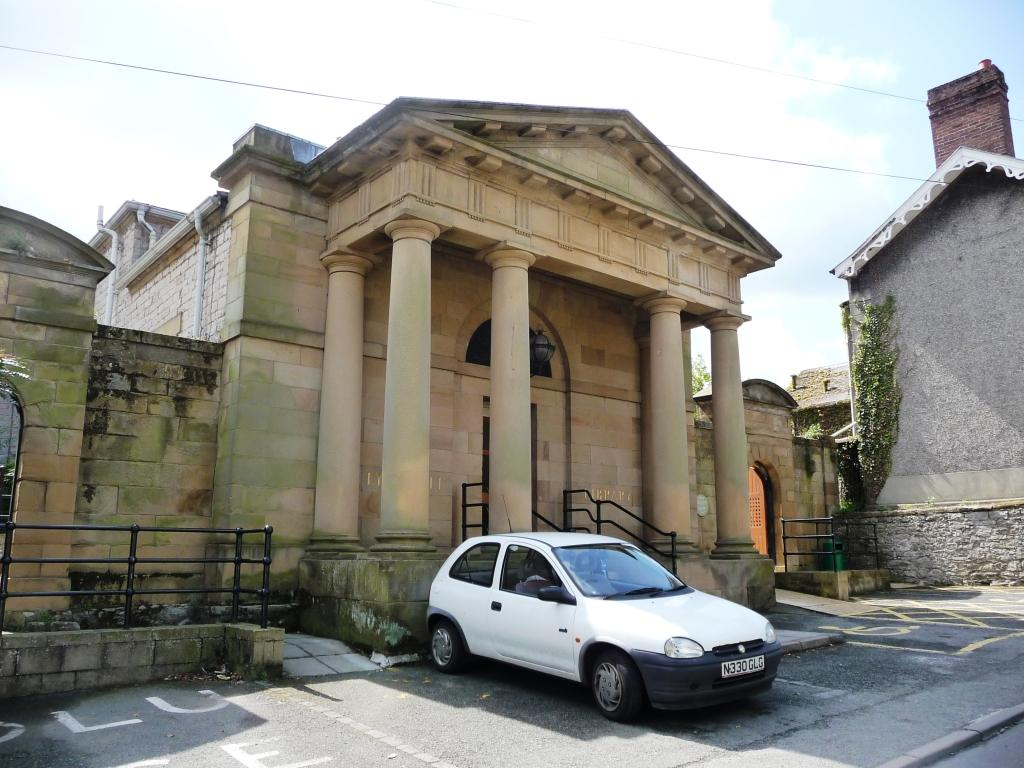
The old county hall in Record Street

It was succeeded by the old county hall in Record Street, which was designed by Joseph Turner as a record office for the Court of Great Sessions in Wales and completed in 1790. It was enhanced by the addition of a tetrastyle portico with Doric order columns supporting a modillioned pediment in 1866. The Record Street building also served as a courthouse, hosting the county's great sessions (superseded by the assizes in 1832). The county's quarter sessions were not regularly held at Ruthin, but alternately at Denbigh and Wrexham.

Elected county councils were established in 1889 under the Local Government Act 1888, taking over the administrative functions of the quarter sessions. In Denbighshire, the county council initially decided to meet alternately at the County Hall in Denbigh and County Buildings, Wrexham, as the quarter sessions had done. In 1891, the council decided instead to hold its meetings in rotation at Denbigh, Ruthin, and Wrexham, using the Record Street building for meetings in Ruthin. In 1900, the county council added Colwyn Bay to list of places where it met. It then held its regular meetings in rotation at Denbigh, Colwyn Bay, Ruthin and Wrexham until the abolition of the first incarnation of the county council in 1974.

Although the county council held its meetings in multiple towns, it recognised that there was a need for a main office building for the council's administrative staff. The county council was split on where such offices should be built. Ruthin Town Council was keen for Ruthin to host such offices rather than any other town. The town council therefore offered to donate to the county council a site it owned at the corner of Wynnstay Road and Market Street. At a meeting in December 1905, the county council then narrowly decided (on the chairman's casting vote) to accept the offer and build its offices in Ruthin, despite protests from Wrexham Town Council.

The new building was designed by Walter Douglas Wiles in the neoclassical style, built in a combination of Eyarth stone and Runcorn stone and was completed in March 1909.

The design involved a symmetrical main frontage on the corner of Market Street and Wynnstay Road. The corner bay featured a round headed doorway with a fanlight and voussoirs on the ground floor and a panel above with the building's name 'County Offices' carved into the stonework; there were three small windows on the first floor separated by colonnettes; the bay was flanked by full-height Ionic order columns supporting a modillioned segmental pediment. The Market Street and Wynnstay Road elevations were decorated in a similar style with slightly projecting bays which featured tri-partite windows on the ground floor, windows separated by colonettes on the first floor and full-height pilasters supporting triangular pediments. The Wynnstay Road building was known as 'County Offices' until the 1974 local government reforms, with the name 'County Hall' being used for the Record Street building.

Following local government reorganisation in 1974, the county offices became the headquarters of Glyndŵr District Council. The old county hall on Record Street was converted into a public library in the late 20th century. Following the creation of unitary authorities in 1996, the Wynnstay Road building became the offices of the new Denbighshire County Council.

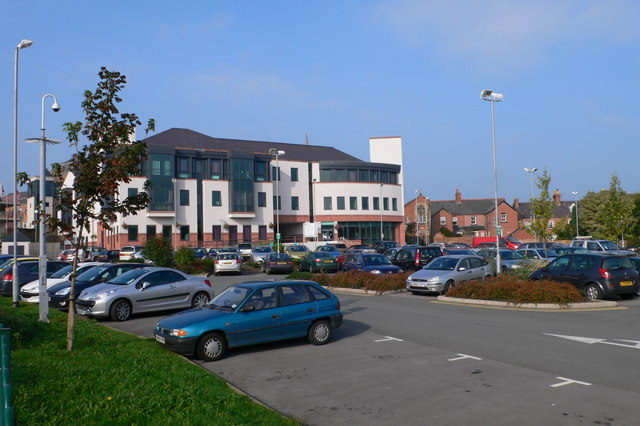
Rear view of the rebuilt building facing Station Road

Most of the building was demolished in 2002, but retaining the main facades to Wynnstay Road and Market Street. A large modern building was then built behind the facade, with the works being procured under a private finance initiative contract. The works were undertaken by Ion Developments at a cost of £20 million and was completed in May 2004. The rebuilt building was given the name 'County Hall'.

In November 2015, the county council bought the developer out of its 25-year contract at a cost to the council of £17 million.
