= Ruthin =

Town in Wales

Ruthin: Welsh: Rhuthun
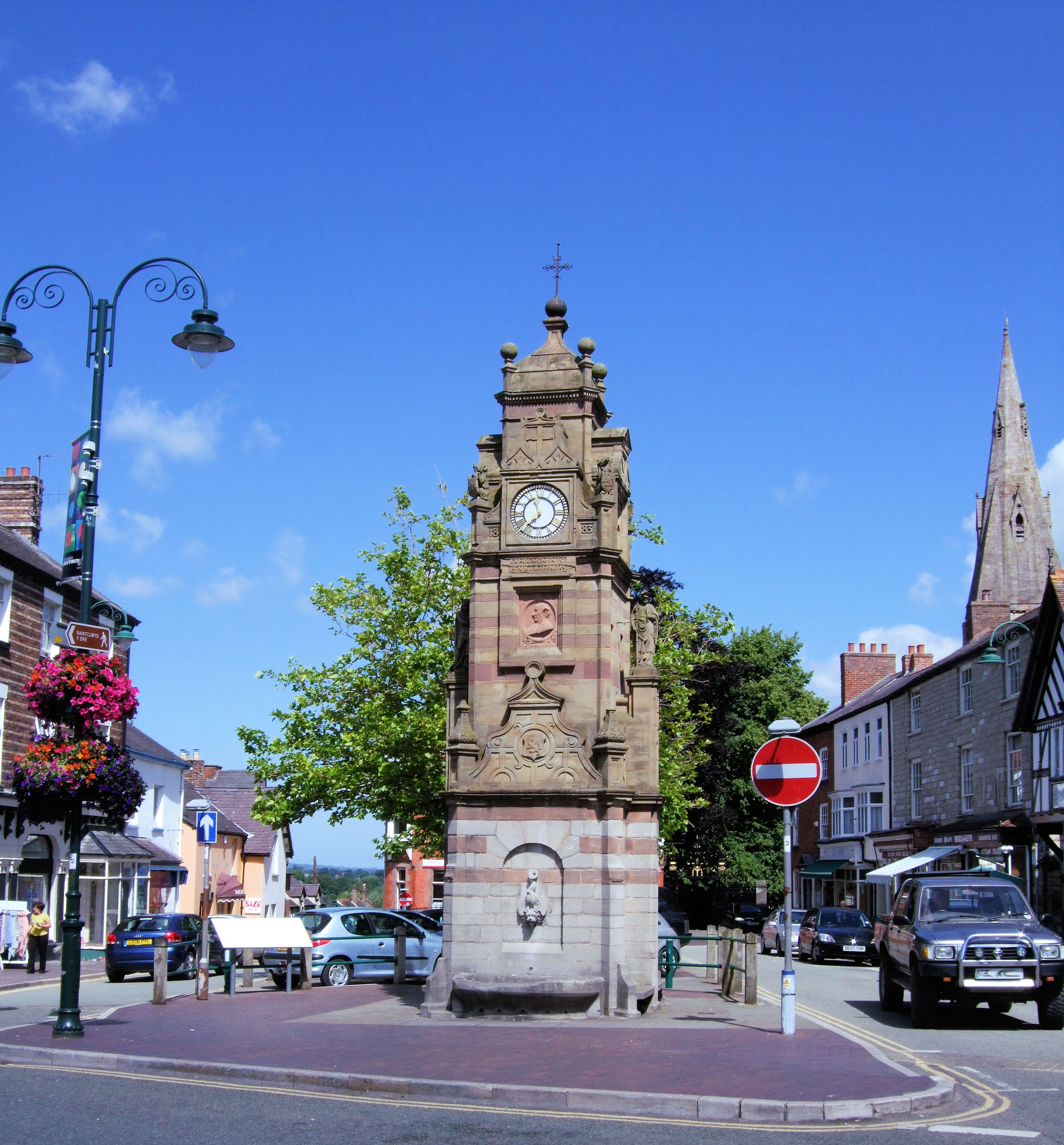
- Peers Memorial, St Peter's Square

- Location within Denbighshire
- Population: 5,698 (Community, 2021)
- OS grid reference: SJ123583
- Community: Ruthin
- Principal area: Denbighshire
- Preserved county: Clwyd
- Country: Wales
- Sovereign state: United Kingdom
- Post town: RUTHIN
- Postcode district: LL15
- Dialling code: 01824
- Police: North Wales
- Fire: North Wales
- Ambulance: Welsh
- UK Parliament: Clwyd East
- Senedd Cymru – Welsh Parliament: Clwyd
- List of places UK Wales Denbighshire 53.115°N 3.312°W Map of the community

Ruthin (/ˈrɪθɪn/ RITH-in; Welsh: Rhuthun) is a market town and community in Denbighshire, Wales, in the south of the Vale of Clwyd. The town, castle and St Peter's Square lie on a hill, skirted by villages such as Pwllglas and Rhewl. The name comes from the Welsh rhudd ('red') and din ('fort'), after the colour of sandstone bedrock, from which the castle was built in 1277–1284. The Old Mill, Ruthin, is nearby. Maen Huail, a registered ancient monument associated with King Arthur and with Hueil mab Caw, the brother of the historian Gildas, stands in St Peter's Square.

== History ==
There is evidence of Celtic and later Roman settlements in the area. However, little is known of the history of the town before the construction of Ruthin Castle was started in 1277 by Dafydd, the brother of prince Llywelyn ap Gruffudd. He forfeited the castle when he rebelled against King Edward I with his brother; Edward's queen, Eleanor, was in residence in 1281. The original name was Castell Coch yng Ngwern-fôr ('red castle in the sea swamps'). The Marcher Lord, Reginald de Grey, Justiciar of Chester, was given the cantref (an administrative district) of Deffrencloyt (Dyffryn Clwyd, the Welsh for 'Vale of Clwyd'), and his family ran the area for the next 226 years. The land dispute between Reginald Grey, 3rd Baron Grey de Ruthyn, and Owain Glyndŵr triggered Glyndŵr's rebellion against King Henry IV, which began on 16 September 1400, when Glyndŵr burned Ruthin to the ground, reputedly leaving only the castle and a few other buildings standing.

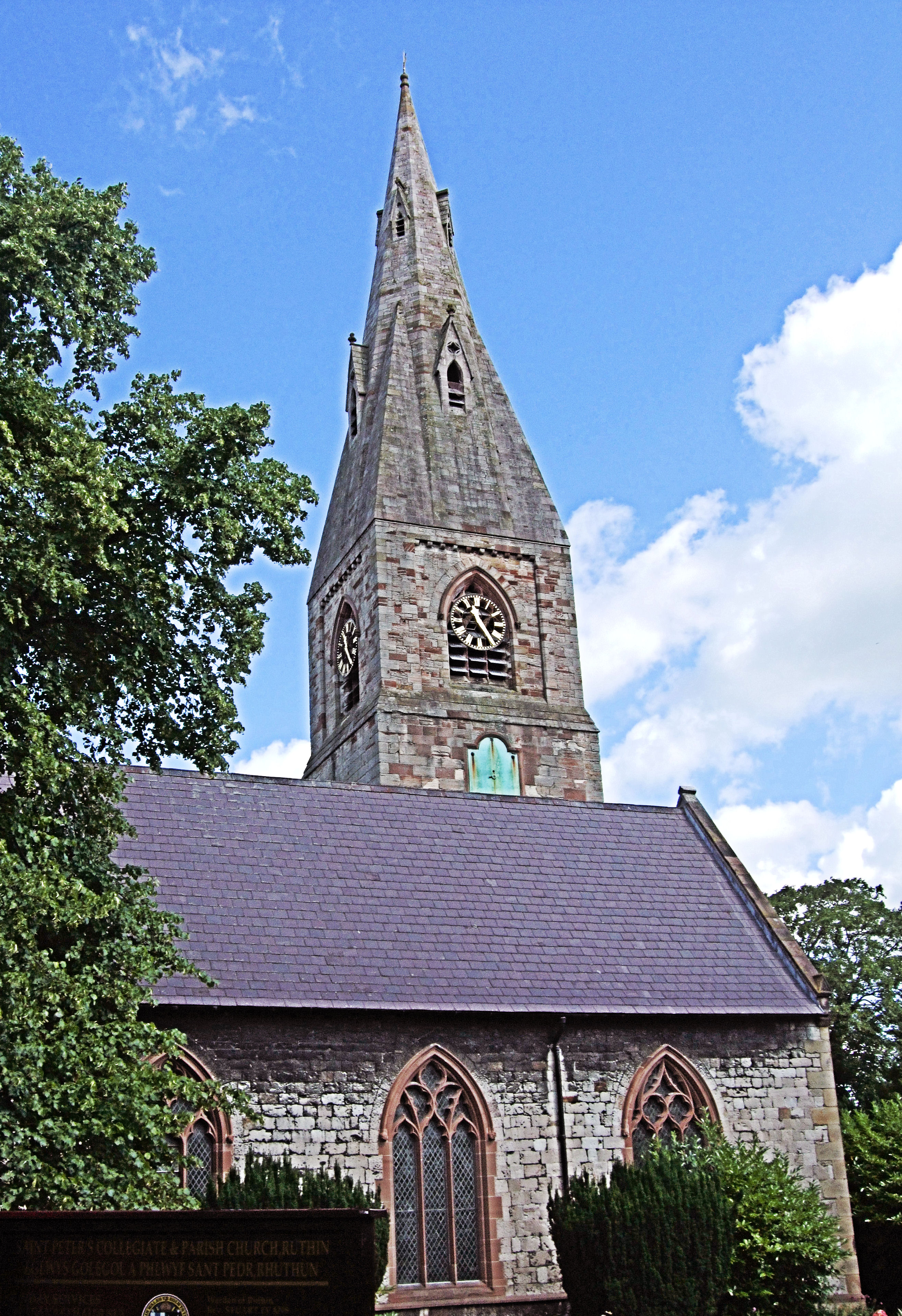
St Peter's Church, Ruthin

Ruthin's first parish church was St Meugan's Church, which stands in a relatively isolated location at Llanrhydd, 1 mile (1.6 km) to the south-east of the town. The site of St Meugan's has apparently been in religious use since the 6th century, although the first documented reference to the building was in 1254. It is possible that the church's location indicates an earlier focus for the settlement, which was subsequently eclipsed by the town which grew up adjoining the castle.

John Grey, 2nd Baron Grey de Wilton, established St Peter's Church in 1310 on the north side of the market place in the centre of the town, now St Peter's Square. The building dominates the Ruthin skyline. It has a double nave and boasts two medieval carved roofs. These days it is known for its musical tradition. It has a large choir of children and adults and a four-manual Wadsworth-Willis organ. Behind the church can be seen the old college buildings, school and Christ's Hospital.

A Ruthin native, Sir Thomas Exmewe was Lord Mayor of the City of London in 1517–1518.

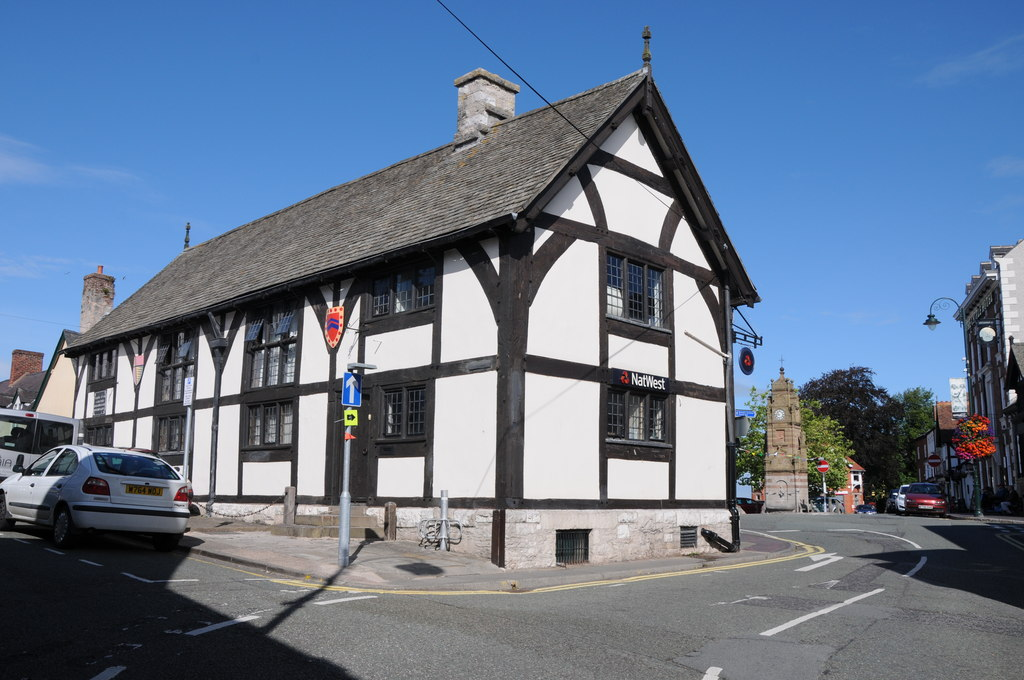
The Old Courthouse

The timber-framed Old Courthouse (built in 1401) on the square, features the remains of a gibbet last used to execute a Franciscan priest, Charles Meehan, also known as Mahoney. He was shipwrecked on the Welsh coast at a time when Catholicism was equated with treason – Meehan was hanged, drawn, and quartered in 1679. He was beatified by Pope John Paul II in 1987 as one of the Eighty-five martyrs of England and Wales.

During the English Civil War, the castle survived an eleven-week siege, after which it was demolished by order of Parliament. It was rebuilt in the 19th century as a country house, which has now been turned into the Ruthin Castle Hotel. From 1826 until 1921 the castle was the home of the Cornwallis-West family, members of Victorian and Edwardian high society.

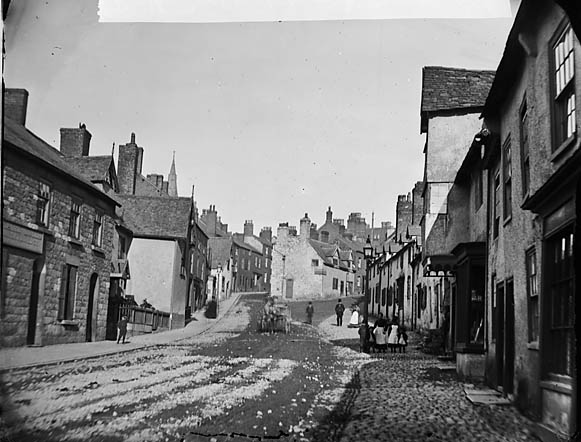
Clwyd Street, Rhuthun, c. 1875.

In its 18th-century heyday as a town on drovers' routes from Wales into England, Ruthin was reputed to have "a pub for every week of the year". By 2007, however, there were only eleven pubs in the town. The public records of 23 October 1891 show 31 such establishments serving a population of 3,186; most have been converted into housing or shops. The Ruthin Union Workhouse was built in 1834.

The first copies of the Welsh national anthem, Hen Wlad Fy Nhadau, were printed in what is now the Siop Nain tea and gift shop on Well Street.

In 1863 the Denbigh, Ruthin and Corwen Railway, which linked in Denbigh with the Vale of Clwyd Railway (later part of the London and North Western Railway, the London, Midland and Scottish Railway, and British Rail) reached the town. The route ran from Rhyl along the north coast through Denbigh and Ruthin to Corwen, before joining a route from Ruabon through Llangollen, Corwen and Bala to Barmouth. The railway and Ruthin railway station closed in 1963 under the Beeching Axe. The site of the station is now occupied by a large road roundabout (Brieg Roundabout) and the Ruthin Craft Centre, which opened in 1982, but was rebuilt and reopened in 2008.

Ruthin hosted the National Eisteddfod in 1868 and 1973. The Urdd National Eisteddfod visited Ruthin in 1992 and 2006.

== Governance ==
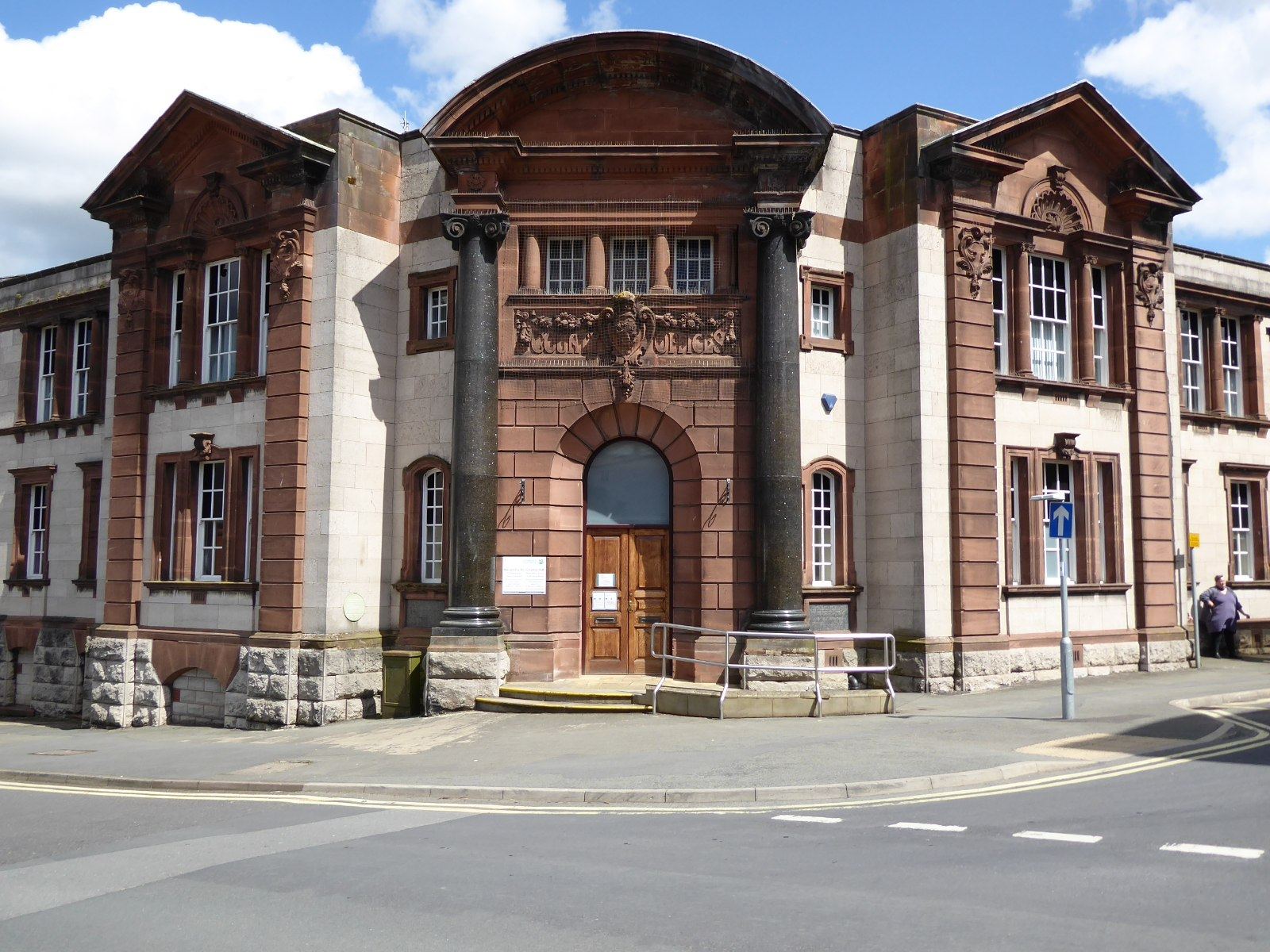
County Hall, headquarters of Denbighshire County Council

There are two tiers of local government covering Ruthin, at community (town) and county level: Ruthin Town Council (Cyngor Tref Rhuthun) and Denbighshire County Council (Cyngor Sir Ddinbych). The town council is based at the Old Courthouse on St Peter's Square. The county council is also based in the town, having its main offices at County Hall on Wynnstay Road.

=== Administrative history ===
Ruthin historically formed part of the ancient parish of Llanrhydd. It became a separate parish following the construction of St Peter's Church in the early 14th century. Ruthin was the main town in the cantref of Dyffryn Clwyd, which became a marcher lordship following the Conquest of Wales by Edward I in the late 13th century. The lordship of Dyffryn Clwyd was also known as the lordship of Ruthin; it became part of Denbighshire on the county's creation in 1536 under the Laws in Wales Act 1535.

Ruthin was also an ancient borough, with its first municipal charter having been issued by Reginald de Grey, presumably shortly after he was awarded the lordship of the area in the late 13th century. The borough covered a larger area than the parish of Ruthin, also including parts of the neighbouring parishes of Llanrhydd, Llanfair Dyffryn Clwyd, Llanynys, and Llanfwrog (including the village and parish church of the latter). The borough was reformed to become a municipal borough in 1836 under the Municipal Corporations Act 1835, which standardised how most boroughs operated across the country.

Denbigh had been declared the county town of Denbighshire on its creation in 1536, with the county's courts directed to be held alternately at Denbigh and Wrexham. However, in the 1780s the county's senior courts, the great sessions, moved to Ruthin after a new courthouse was built on Record Street (the great sessions were replaced by the assizes in 1832). The county's quarter sessions continued to be held alternately at Denbigh and Wrexham, and knights of the shire (MPs for the Denbighshire constituency) were elected at Denbigh.

The first Denbighshire County Council was created in 1889, taking over various administrative functions previously performed by the county's magistrates at the quarter sessions. The county council decided not to meet in a single town. It initially met alternately at Denbigh and Wrexham, as the quarter sessions did. From 1891 it also met at Ruthin, and in 1900 it also started meeting in Colwyn Bay. The council then met at those four towns in rotation until that first incarnation of the county council was abolished in 1974. Although the council held its meetings in multiple towns, it decided to consolidate its main offices in a central location. It therefore built the County Offices at Ruthin, which opened in 1909.

The borough of Ruthin was abolished in 1974 under the Local Government Act 1972. The area became part of the new district of Glyndŵr in Clwyd. The area of the pre-1974 borough became a community called Ruthin, with its community council taking the name Ruthin Town Council. The upper tiers of local government were reorganised again in 1996, when the modern Denbighshire and its county council were created.

== Demographics ==
At the 2021 census, the community had a population of 5,698. Of the population over three years old, 38% could speak Welsh. The built up area covers a very similar area to the community; built up area populations were reported to the nearest five people, and Ruthin's built up area was reported to have a population of 5,700.

== Education ==
The town's principal school is Ysgol Brynhyfryd (Brynhyfryd School), a comprehensive school for 11 to 18 year olds. Its Grade II listed building was built about 1830 as the home of local solicitor, before becoming in 1898 Ruthin County School for Girls. (The town's boys travelled five miles by train to Denbigh High School.) The school went co-educational in 1938, with feeder junior schools up to around six miles away. Building work in the 1950s and the early 1970s increased the number of pupils from 700 to 1000 in a few years, as the minimum school-leaving age rose from 15 to 16). In 2001–2002 the listed building became the Sixth Form Centre. The school's sports facilities, including the swimming pool, are used as the town's Leisure Centre. It also features a theatre and arts complex, Theatr John Ambrose, named after a headmaster of the school in the 1980s and 1990s. This was opened by the actor Rhys Ifans, a former pupil of Ysgol Pentrecelyn and Ysgol Maes Garmon in Mold, but brought up in Ruthin.

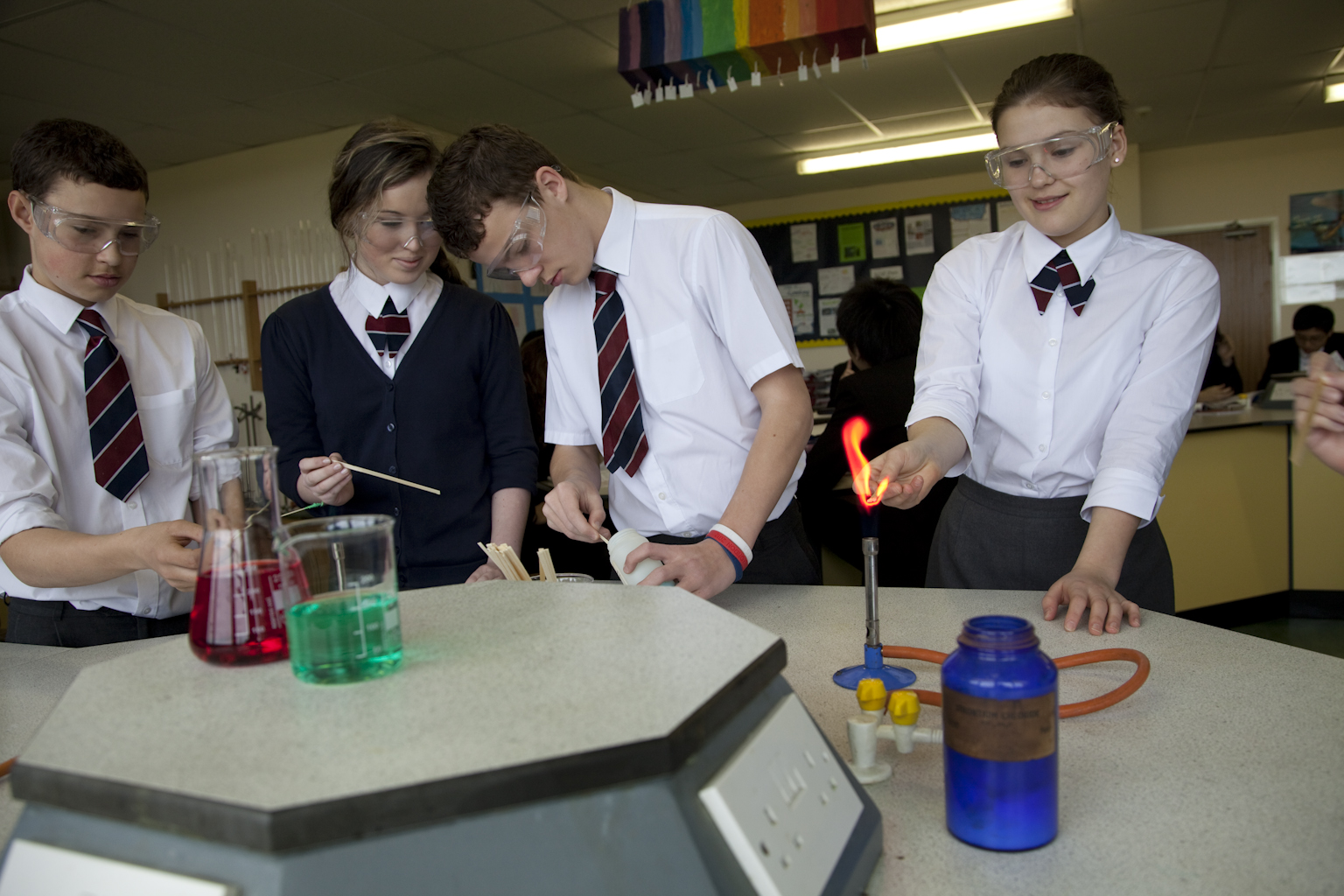
Pupils at a science laboratory at Ruthin School

In 1574 Gabriel Goodman re-founded Ruthin School which was founded in 1284, making it one of the oldest private schools in the United Kingdom. Ruthin School is a co-educational boarding and day school with around 210 pupils. In 2025, the school was named among the best independent schools in Wales by the Sunday Times Parent Power rankings, with 52% of A-level grades awarded at A*–A.

== Transport ==
=== Bus ===
Ruthin has daytime bus services on Mondays to Saturdays, with the last bus on most routes leaving between 5.30 and 7.30 pm. There is no service on Sundays or public holidays. Routes serving Ruthin are Stagecoach 1 and 2 to Mold (1 via Llanarmon and Llanferres, 2 via Llanarmon, Graianrhyd, and Erryrys), X1 runs three times a day to Chester via Llanferres and Mold – frequency of the buses to Mold varies throughout the day between 30 minutes and 2 hours. Route X51 by Arriva runs basically hourly between Rhyl, St Asaph, Denbigh, Ruthin, and Wrexham (Rhyl bus station is next to the railway station, providing Ruthin's most convenient access to the national rail network, while Wrexham railway station is a short distance from its bus station.) Route 55, by Llew Jones Coaches, operates to Corwen at intervals of 50–135 minutes through the day, with three buses extended to Llangollen, and two of these via Llangollen to Wrexham. Route 76, by M & H Coaches, runs six times a day between Denbigh and Ruthin via Llandyrnog, Llangynhafal, and Llanbedr DC; two of these also serve Llanfair DC, Graigfechan, and Pentrecelyn. Less regular services include a weekly route 71 on Fridays between Corwen, Cerrigydrudion, Ruthin, and Morrisons' supermarket in Denbigh, and route 72 on Mondays, Wednesdays, and Fridays for Cyffylliog, Clocaenog, Bontuchel, Betws Gwerfil Goch, Melin-y-Wig, Derwen, and Clawddnewydd. Ruthin town has route 73, operating three buses a day around Ruthin on Mondays, Wednesdays and Fridays.

=== Rail ===
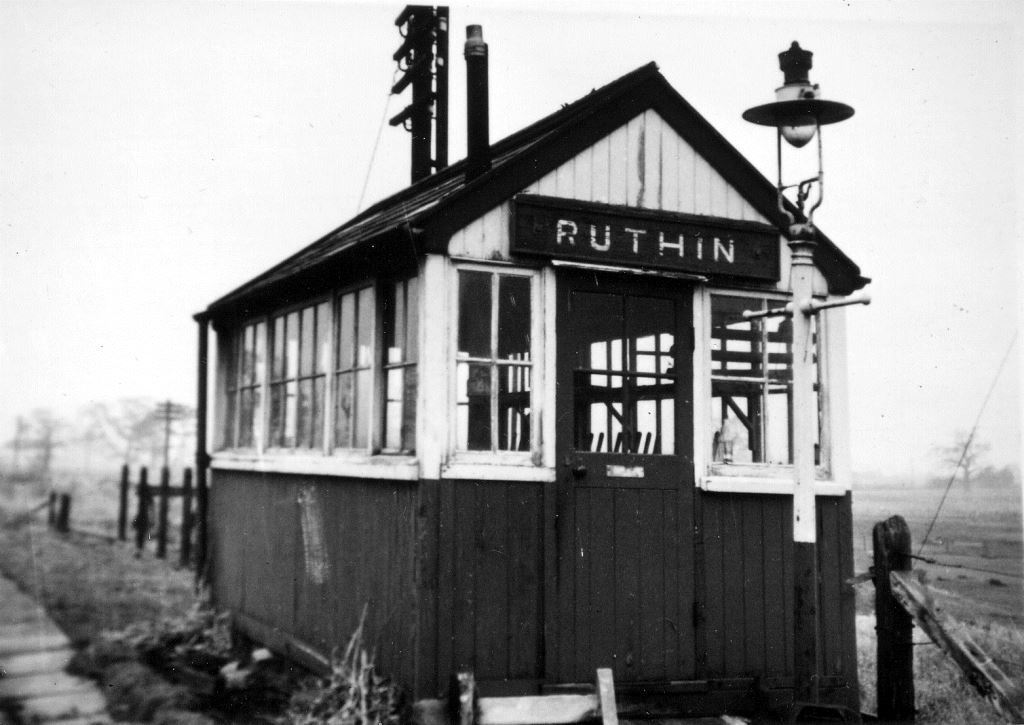
Ruthin station 1963

The Ruthin railway line and station closed in the 1960s. They had connected Ruthin to Denbigh and Rhyl to the north and Corwen to the south.

In 1858, it was intended to extend the Vale of Clwyd line from Denbigh to Ruthin, running alongside the race-course in the town park (now Parc-y Dre housing) to the Station Hotel. However the West family prevented the line crossing the Castle Park towards Corwen. The route was diverted to the north alongside the road to Wrexham and the Station Hotel renamed the Park Place Hotel. Opposite Station Road lies Railway Terrace, a row of Grade II listed buildings, built in 1864 with evidence of trains running in a cutting in front. The first sod was cut in September 1860 by Mrs Florence West, with an inaugural service starting on St David's Day 1862. To mark this, a song was composed with words by T. Ab Gwilym, music by B. Williams and published by Isaac Clarke. The line ran 6.75 miles (10.9 km), with stations at Rhewl and Llanrhaiadr.

== Sport ==
The local football club is Ruthin Town. In rugby union, Clwb Rygbi Rhuthun/Ruthin RFC has several teams: 1st XV, 2nd XV, 3rd XV, Youth, Juniors & Women's XV.

On 13 June 1981, Ruthin hosted the Annual General Meeting of the International Football Association Board, the body which determines the laws of football.

Facilities at Ruthin Leisure Centre on Mold Road include a swimming pool, sports hall and fitness suite. Llanfwrog Community Centre on Mwrog Street provides tennis courts, a golf driving range and bowling greens.

== Tourism ==
=== Ruthin Gaol ===
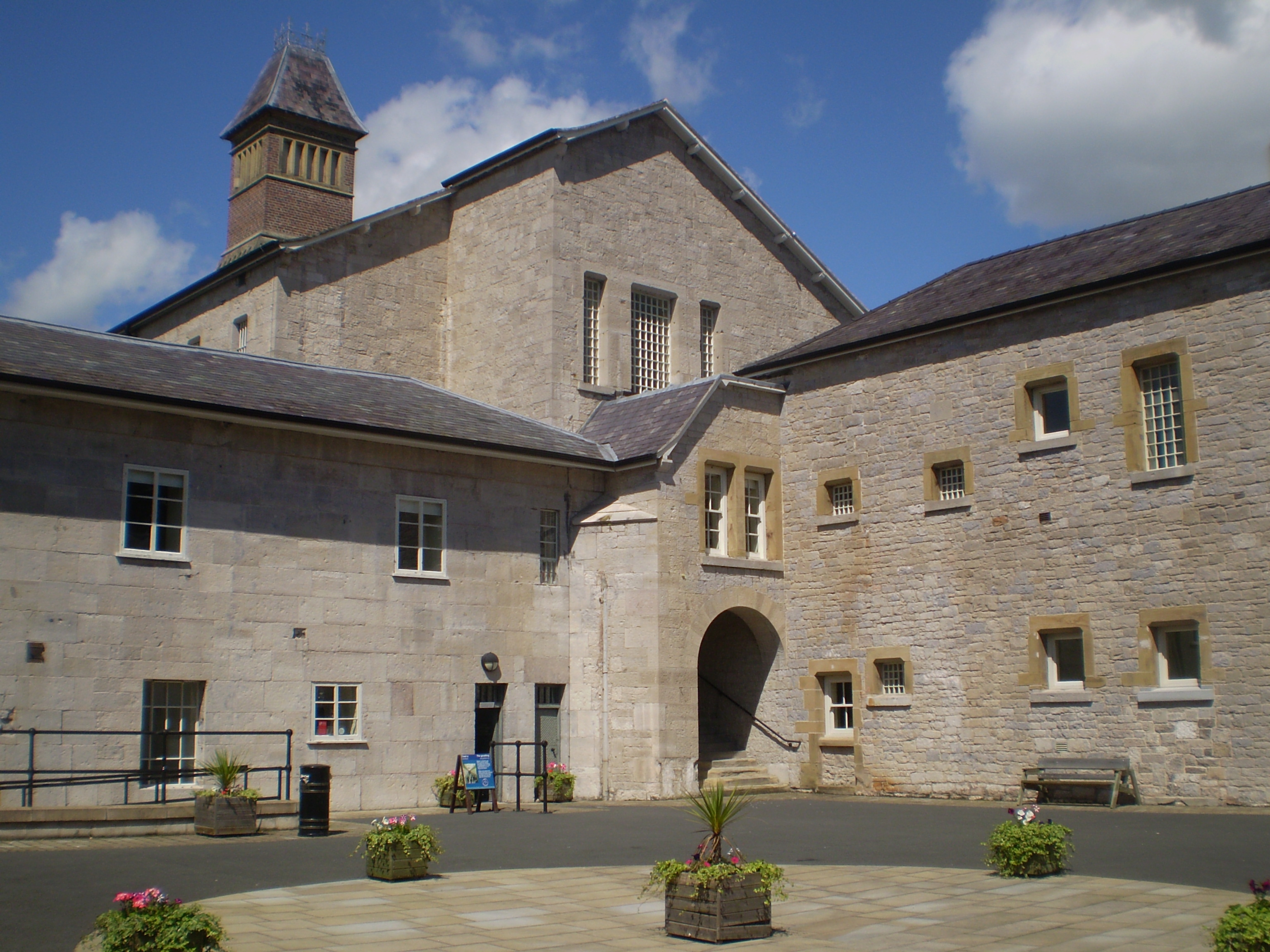
The courtyard at the old gaol, which is now a museum.

The first house of correction, or bridewell, was built at the bottom of Clwyd Street, next to the river, in 1654, to replace the Old Court House, where able-bodied idlers and the unemployed were sent to work. Following John Howard's investigations into prison conditions the Denbighshire justices resolved to build a new model prison in Ruthin on the site of the old Bridewell. Work began in January 1775. In 1802 the prison had four cells for prisoners and nine rooms for debtors. By 1837 it could hold 37 inmates. The Prison Act 1865 (28 & 29 Vict. c. 126) set new standards for the design of prisons – as the Ruthin County Gaol did not meet the standards, plans were drawn up for a new four-storey wing. The new prison for up to 100 prisoners was built in the style of London's Pentonville Prison at a cost of £12,000. On 1 April 1878 the Ruthin County Gaol became HM Prison Ruthin, covering the counties of Denbighshire, Flintshire, and Merionethshire.

Ruthin Gaol is a Grade II* listed building

As far as is known, only one person was ever executed in the prison: William Hughes of Denbigh, aged 42, who was hanged on 17 February 1903 for the murder of his wife, his plea of insanity having failed. Another prison personality was John Jones, known as Coch Bach y Bala – who was a kleptomaniac and poacher who had spent more than half his 60 years in all the prisons of north Wales and many in England; he twice escaped from Ruthin Gaol, first on 30 November 1879 when he walked out of prison with three others while the staff were having supper – a £5 reward was offered for his capture, which happened on the following 3 January. On 30 September 1913 he tunnelled out of his cell and using a rope made out of his bedding he climbed over the roof of the chapel and kitchen and got over the wall; after seven days living rough on the Nantclwyd Estate several miles away, Jones was shot in the leg by one of his pursuers, 19-year-old Reginald Jones-Bateman. Jones died of shock and blood loss, while Jones-Bateman was charged with manslaughter, though the charges were subsequently dropped.

Ruthin Gaol ceased to be a prison in 1916, when the prisoners and guards were transferred to Shrewsbury Prison. The county council bought the buildings in 1926 and used them for offices, the county archives and the town library. During the Second World War they were used as a munitions factory. They were then returned to the county council and became the headquarters of the Denbighshire Library Service. In 2004 the gaol was renovated and reopened as a museum.

Most Haunted: Midsummer Murders filmed the series' fifth episode in Ruthin, where the team investigated a Victorian Era murder. Locations included the Old Gaol and the town library.

=== The Craft Centre ===
The Craft Centre had ten studios occupied by crafters who could be watched while they worked at glass blowing, ceramic manufacture, painting, furniture restoration, etc. The original Craft Centre was demolished early in 2007, and a new Craft Centre opened in July 2008 in a £4.3 million scheme, which contains six craft workshops, larger galleries and an expanded craft retail gallery, two residency studios, an education space and a tourist information centre, and a restaurant.

=== Nantclwyd y Dre ===
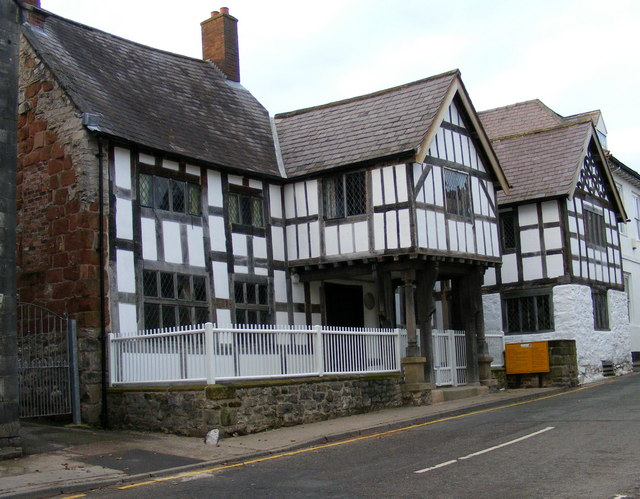
Nantclwyd y Dre looking north on Castle Street

Nantclwyd y Dre (previously known as Tŷ Nantclwyd), in Castle Street, was built about 1435 by a local merchant Gronw ap Madoc. The building was sold to the county council in 1982, restored from 2004, and opened to the public in 2007. It contains seven rooms which have been restored to represent various periods in the building's history. Visitors can also observe a colony of Lesser horseshoe bats in the attic rooms.

Behind the house are two gardens, the 13th-century inner garden and the outer Lord's Garden, itself believed to have been part of a 13th-century developed castle garden. Restored in the 18th century, Lord's Garden is now itself Grade II listed. In December 2013, the council successfully applied for a grant of £177,600 from the Heritage Lottery Fund, which will see Lord's Garden restored and opened to the public by 2015.

=== Cae Ddôl ===
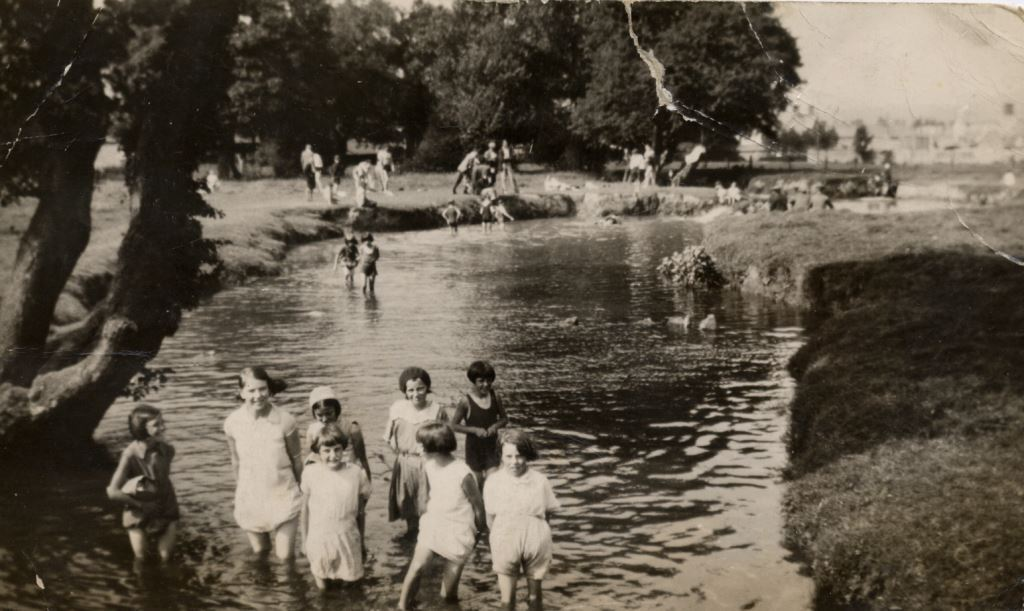
Cae Ddôl, 1920

This is Ruthin's main park area, which includes a children's play area, a lake, walks and picnic area. A skate park was built in 2007 and a zip wire and trim trail added later. The River Clwyd runs through the park.

=== Gŵyl Rhuthun Festival ===
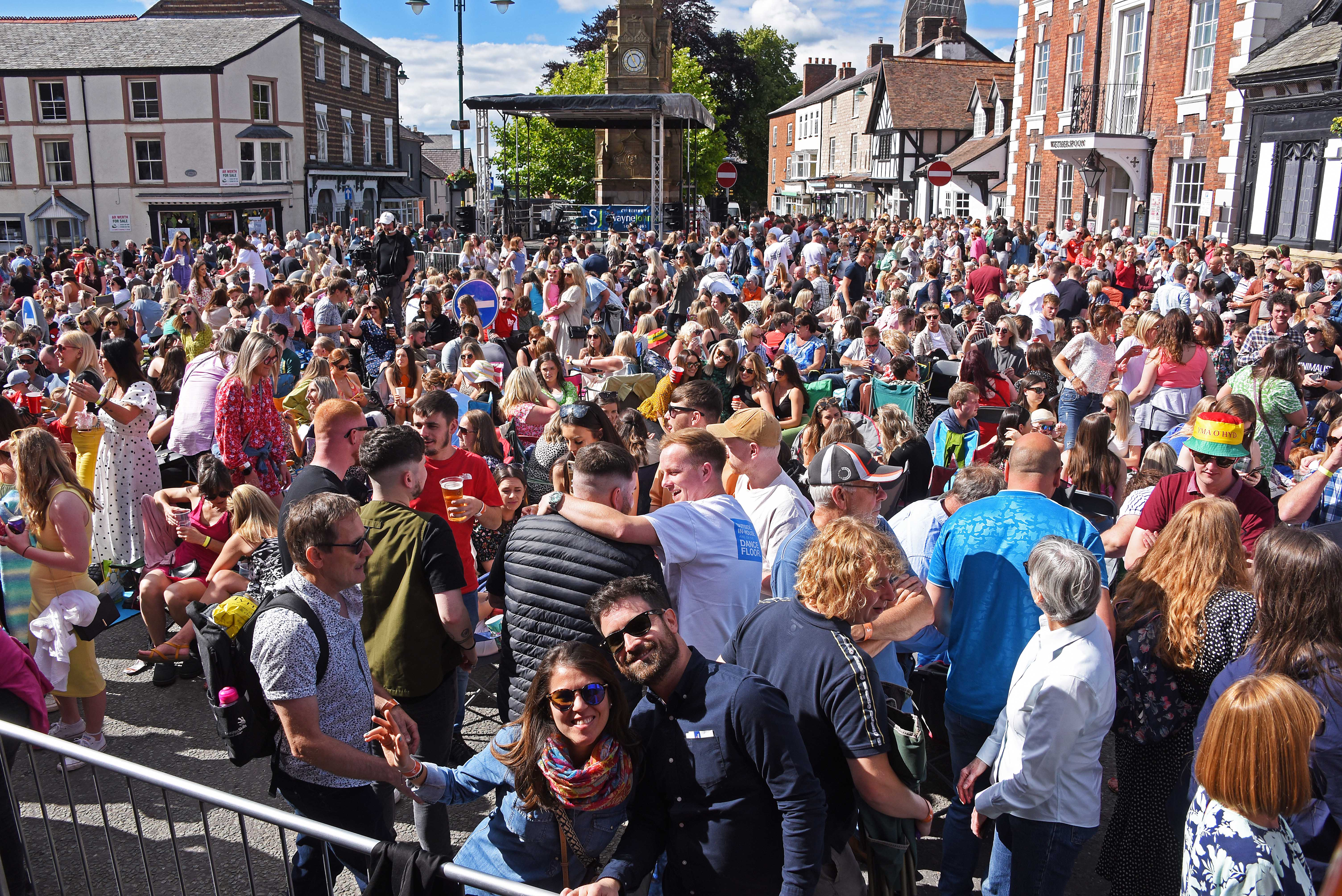
Crowd enjoying the Top of Town Event, 2022

Gŵyl Rhuthun Festival was founded in 1994 and has been held annually since 1996. The festival is a week filled with events and performances held in various locations around the town, beginning with Ruthin Carnival. The pinnacle of the festival is the Top of Town event held on Ruthin's historic town square on the last Saturday of the week.

== Listed buildings ==
According to the historian Peter Smith, "Until the 18th century most towns in Wales had many black-and-white houses (such as Tŷ Nantclwyd y Dre). Ruthin is the only example we have left. It should be carefully conserved, as the last memory we have of these towns." Seven Eyes is a Grade II* listed building of some importance, situated in St Peter's Square.

=== St Peter's Square ===
St Peter's Church

St Peter's Church is the parish church of Ruthin. It is in the diocese of St Asaph. Parts are as old as 1282.

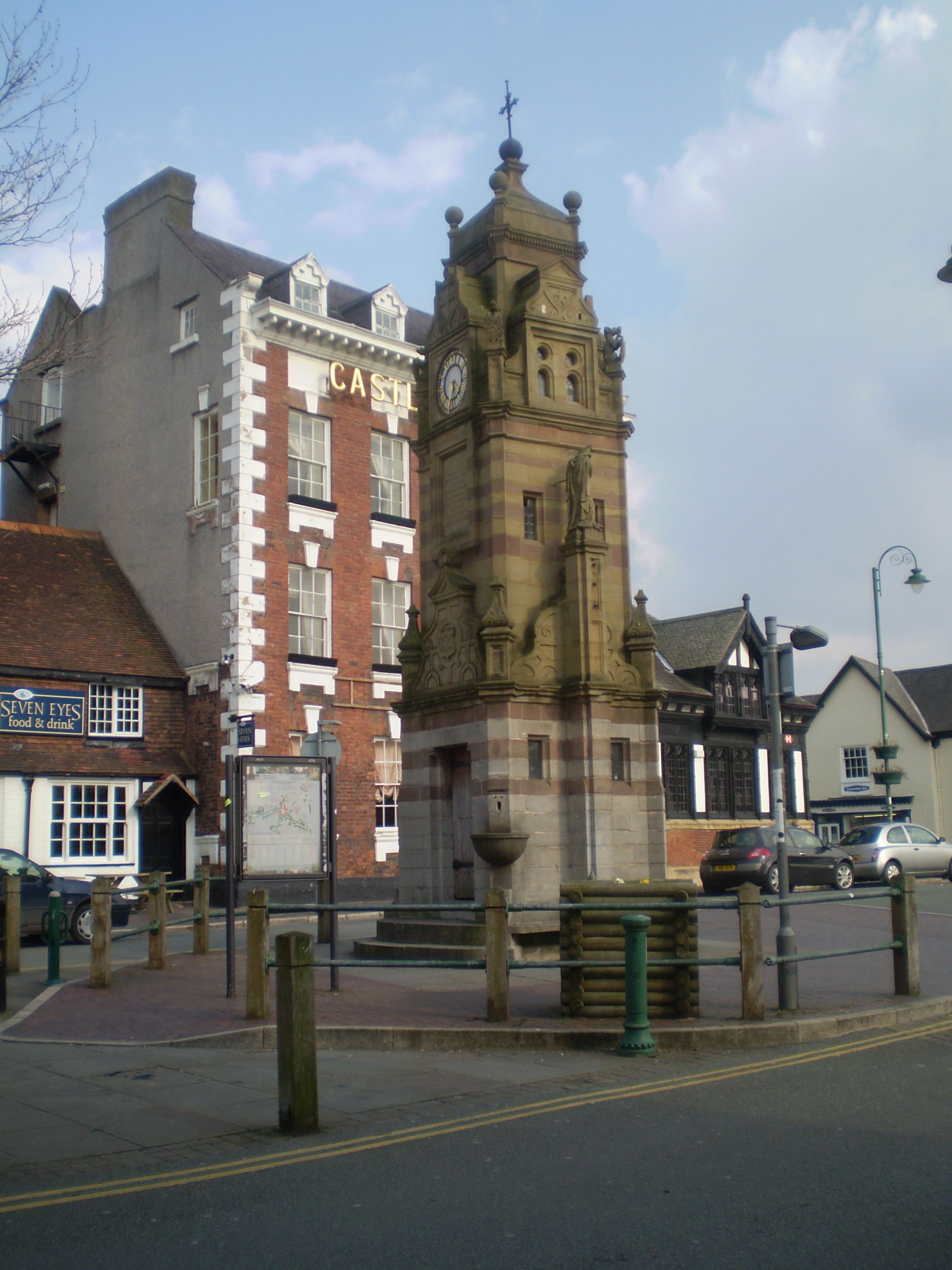
Clock tower on St Peter's Square. In the background are the Myddleton Arms pub, Castle Hotel, and HSBC bank

The Myddleton Arms

The Myddleton Arms is also known as the Seven Eyes. It is said to have been built in the 14th century. The Dutch style design, long, steeped roof is attributed to Sir Richard Clough, an Elizabethan merchant. It has four tiers of dormer windows, each at a different elevation, known locally as the seven eyes of Ruthin. The property was acquired in 1595 by Sir Hugh Myddleton, who provided London with it first fresh water supply. The view of The Myddleton on the square is in fact of the rear of the building. The front looks out over the Clwydian Hills.

HSBC Bank

Formerly a confectionery and bakery shop rented by Thomas Trehearne, the property was owned by the Castle estate. The property also served as a chemist's shop and later as Dick's boot store. On 1 May 1898, Harris Jones took a lease of the property for 21 years as a draper, hosier, glover and dressmaker; he also sold oilcloths, linoleum and other floor coverings. The shop and house were put up for sale in the 1913 by the castle estate along with the Castle Hotel and the Myddleton Arms, which were purchased by William Owen. His lease expired in 1919 with Jones transferring to what is now Gayla House, where he converted the ground floor from residential to retail premises in 1923. The premises are now owned by the HSBC Bank.

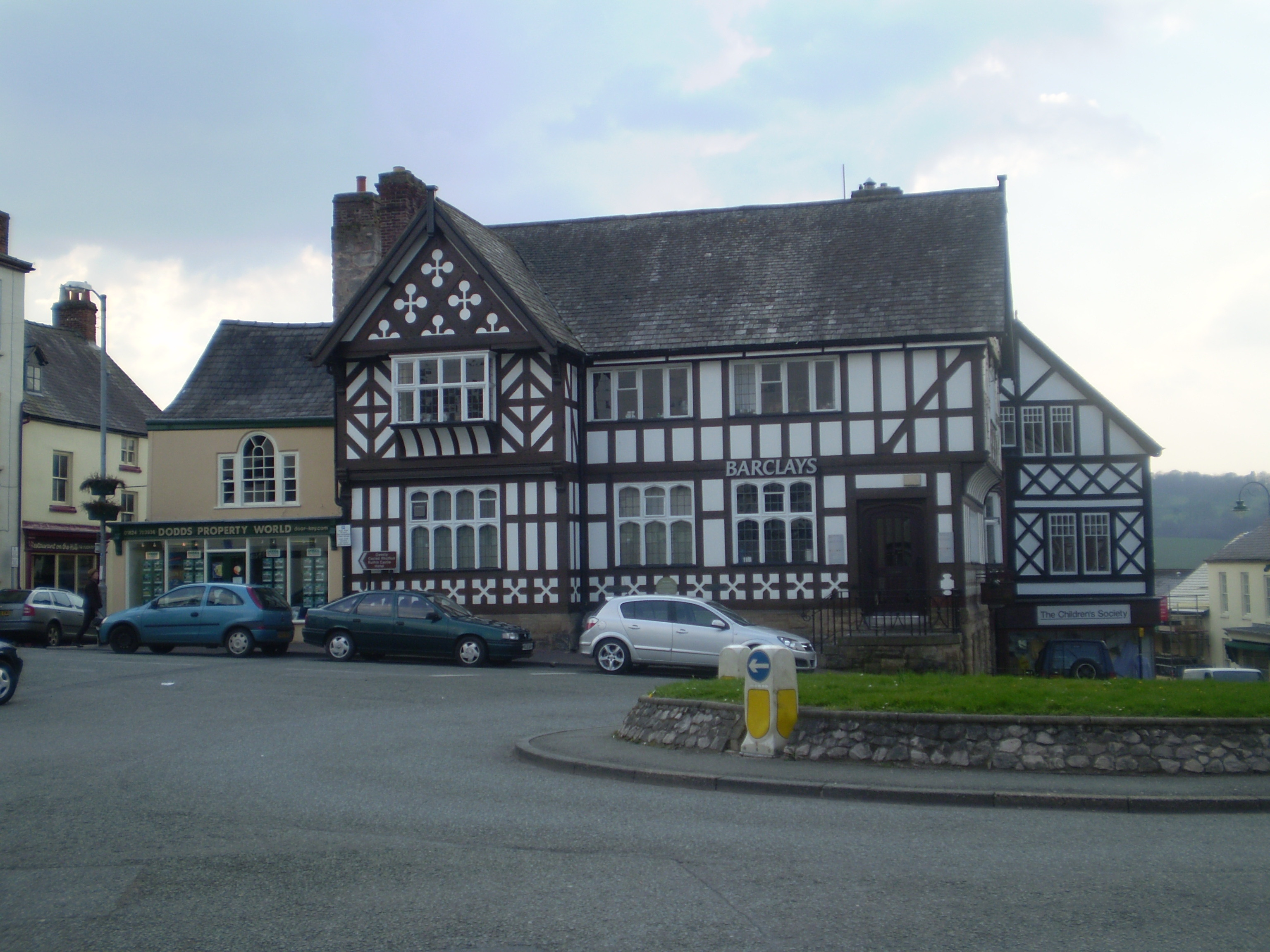
Exmewe Hall, on St Peter's Square, is now Barclays Bank. Despite appearances, it was reconstructed entirely in the 20th century from modern materials

Exmewe House

Formerly the Beehive, this served for 75 years as general drapery and millinery shop. The exact date of the building is not known, but remains of timber framing with wattle and daub indicate that the building is very old. An advertisement claimed the building had been built before 1397. The main section of the building was demolished to make way for the bank. Ruthin Court Rolls refer to a man named Telemann in Ruthin and to a house "in the high St." The rolls record that in 1397, Howell de Rowell passed it on to John Le Sergant. Little is known of the family – possibly a retainer of Edward 1st or Reginald de Grey, probably of Norman French descent. On 24 February, Sergant transferred the tenancy to his daughter Sibilia. The property passed to the Exmewe family by the marriage of Sibilia to Richard Exmewe, their son Thomas being Lord Mayor of London in 1517. Little is known of Exmewe family.

Thomas moved to London, deciding to sell his Ruthin Estate of Exmewe House to a fellow mercer, Edward Goodman. Exmewe House or Nant Clwyd-y-Dre may have been the birthplace of Gabriel Goodman, as the family had connections with both properties.

Details of the next 200 years are unclear. It became the King's Arms in the occupation of John Price. It then became the Queen's Arms (during the reign of Queen Anne, 1702–1714). The property was purchased for £300 on 5 November 1718 by Robert Myddleton of Chirk. The property served as a chemist's through the 19th century until 1913. It was then sold as part of the Castle Estate sales in 1913/1919, for £1275 to Mr Lecomber, who in turn sold it to Barclays Bank, which modernised it to what can be seen today.

The Post Office

Now trading as the Celtic Hair Studio at 2 Well Street. Originally a public house, it was reputedly built in 1401, making it the oldest pub in Ruthin. Lewis Jones, in his 1884 "Handbook For Ruthin and the Vicinity", stated that the old property, formerly the Ruth Inn, had been adapted as a post office some 25 years before. It ceased trading in 1773. In 1850, the building was converted into a drapery, then becoming the town post office again until 1904.

The site of the present post office may have been a medieval Carmelite priory of White Friars, said to have been founded and built by Reginald de Grey and partly destroyed by the Reformation. De Grey also provided a large piece of land close to the castle known as Whitefriars. During the 1860s and 1870s the site housed the Queen's Head public house and a horse-feed chandler; both buildings were destroyed by a 1904 fire; the new post office was built in 1906.

=== Clwyd Street ===
Reebees

Located at 33, 35 and 37 Clwyd Street opposite the gaol and now a florist, it was originally the Red Lion public house. In 1824 the hangman, Sam Burrows, was staying at the Red Lion on the night before the execution of John Connor, a highway robber. He gave a detailed demonstration of how he actually hanged a man, unfortunately the stool was accidentally kicked away and Burrows almost hanged himself. The public house ceased trading in 1905.

The Royal Oak

Now flats, the Royal Oak is one of the finest buildings in Ruthin, having three cruck frames, it is a Grade II* listed building.

==== Porth y Dŵr ====
At No. 65 Clwyd Street, this Grade II* listed building retains much of the medieval timber frame internally, the oak for which was felled in 1455 and 1456. Its original purpose is unknown, although it has a medieval arched doorway facing towards the 13th-century mill, and a 15th-century solar (private living quarters) with an open roof with cusped windbraces. It is said to have been converted for domestic use in 1586 and occupied by the Moyle family. A two-storey porch with glazed windows (previously described as a balcony) and internal timber panelling was added, possibly in 1655 when further alterations were made. The building was extensively altered in the 19th century, being converted partly into a shop. Porth y Dŵr originally formed a single building with No. 67 Clwyd Street (listed Grade II), and adjoined the medieval west gate to the town, which was demolished in 1786.

=== Castle Street ===
All buildings on Castle Street are listed by Cadw. These are the earliest settlements outside the walls of the castle. Some have burgage plots at the back, established by de Grey in 1283. The plots and linear arrangement have barely changed since their foundation.

While there were residential properties at the castle end of the street, commercial properties appeared at the end close to St Peters Square. The one exception was the pub Yr Iwerddon at No. 15. The house retains a name referring to its connection with Irish drovers attending markets and fairs.

Other establishments of interest include No. 1, now Boots, formerly the Raven Inn, which in 1560 may have been the birthplace of Bishop Richard Parry, pupil and master (1584) of Ruthin School. He was involved with Dean Gabriel Goodman and others in translating the Bible and prayer book into Welsh. The main contributor was Bishop William Morgan, but Parry's revision in 1620 became the accepted authorised version.

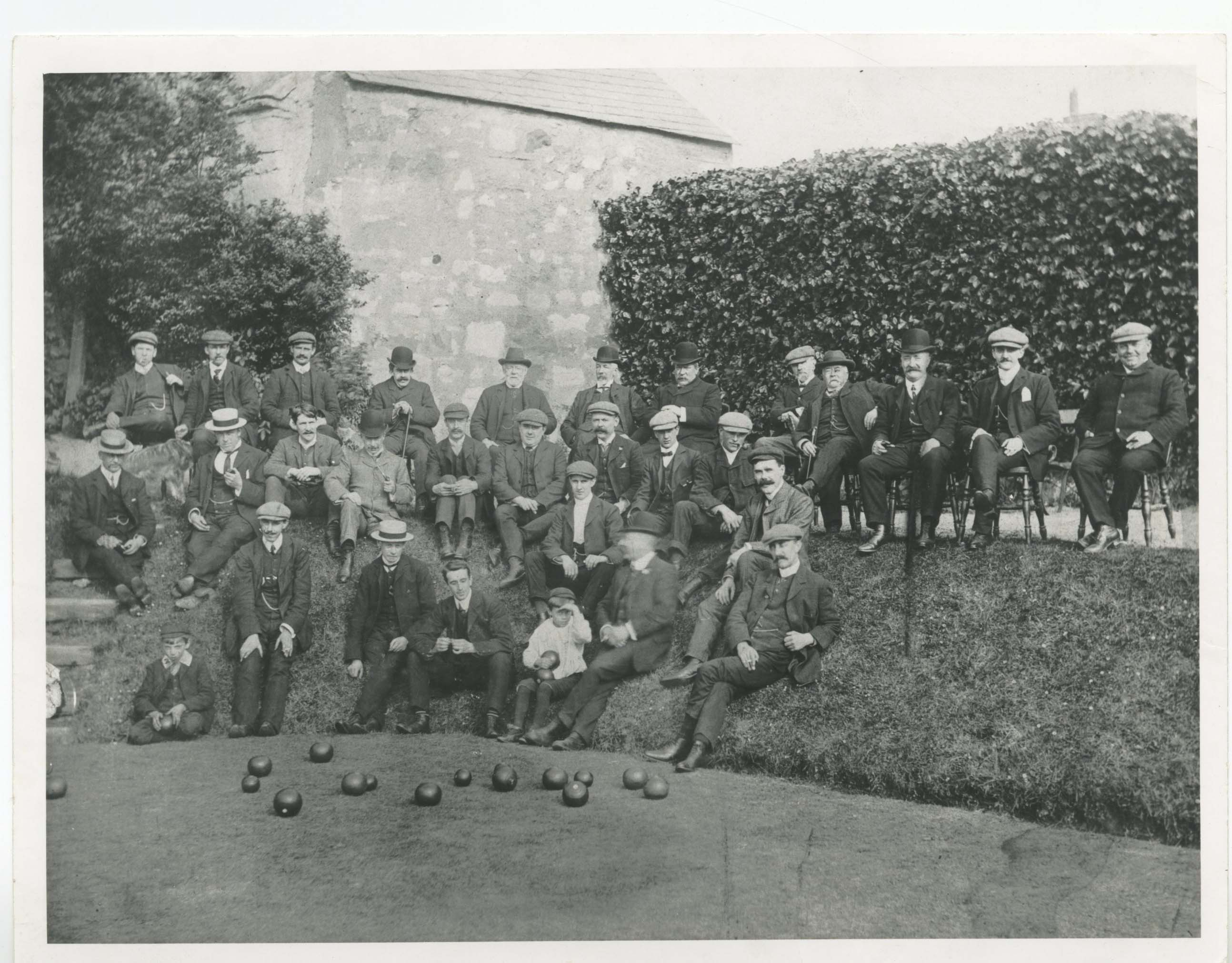
The old Bowling green at Castle St, c. 1910

The Ruthin Royal Bowling Green used the Raven as their headquarters until the Cornwallis-Wests came to live in Ruthin Castle. The club met at the Raven for its annual and quarterly meetings. When competitions took place, the staff of the Raven would take "cwrw da" (good beer) to the players. With the arrival of the Wests, the bowling green laid out inside the curtilage of the castle forced the club to find an alternative green. The option accepted was the rear of No. 8 Castle Street "Gorphwysfa", then called the Constitutional Club, later renamed the Conservative Club.

- No. 2. The Wine Vaults with a six-column Tuscan colonnade were 'known as the Black Horse in the 1820s. This is verified by the Welsh Office survey.
- No. 7. Sir John Trevor House served as Totty's the Lawyers in the 1700s, later as an antique shop and tea shop, and finally as a private residence offering bed and breakfast accommodation. Sir John Trevor was Speaker of the House of Commons from 1690 to 1695, when he was dismissed for embezzlement. He was the only Speaker forced to resign, until the forced departure of Michael Martin on 19 May 2009.
- "Gorphwysfa" was part of the Castle estate until sold off its owners in 1919. The Rifle Volunteer Corps founded in 1859 stored its armoury at the house until a drill hall was built in Borthyn in 1885. The property became the Conservative Club in November 1885.
- No. 9, known as "Corwen", held the offices of Phillips the Attorney. It is now a private residence.
- No. 11, Ardwyn, is a private residence on three storeys, formerly the offices of the attorneys Smarts.
- No. 12, Plas-yn-Dre, cannot be dated accurately. It was rebuilt in 1823, as recorded by a stone above the front door. It housed the North and South Wales Bank. L. G. Thomas, prime mover in the founding the Presbyterian Church in Wynnstay Road in 1886, was bank manager and lived here.
- Nos 16 and 18 are wooden-framed buildings with a 19th-century frontage. They formed part of the Castle estate sales of 1913 and 1919. They probably represent the first use of stucco in Ruthin.

=== Record Street ===
The Old County Hall, now Ruthin Library, is a Grade II Listed Building in Record Street, originally named Stryd y Chwain (Welsh for Flea Street) due to its very low standard of living. The inferior housing was demolished to make way for the county court and much grander houses between 1785 and 1788. The present name reflects the storing of records from the assizes and shire hall. In 1860 it became the county court, with a portico added at that time. It served as an assize court and housed its records until the 1970s. The library opened in the early 1990s.

The police station is a Grade II listed building of 1890. Before it was built, the original one was housed in Ruthin Gaol. The new one gave convenient access to the courts. It contains four cells, which are no longer used, and a much reduced number of police officers.

=== Well Street ===
Castle Mews, a Grade II listed building is now a shopping precinct. It dates back to the 15th century, with examples of wattle and daub just inside the building on the right hand side. Remodeled in the early 19th century, it became the Cross Keys coaching inn serving the Ruthin to Chester route, with a change of horses in Mold. It later became a temperance commercial hotel and was home to one of the three Ruthin Friendly Societies: groups of male workers of similar background who contributed small amounts on a weekly basis for insurance against injury and old age. At a later date it was the offices of Ruthin Rural District Council.

Nos 10 and 12, a late 18th-century family town house, is Grade II listed. It retained its late Georgian character until converted into today's boutique hotel and art gallery. The cellars are said to have been built of stone from Ruthin Castle. The building has had many uses: as a boarding house for Ruthin School until 1893, a doctors home, a family home, whose most famous resident was Cynthia Lennon, wife of John Lennon while their son Julian attended Ruthin School, a restaurant from the 1930s and a hotel. Today's hotel architecture and art have won several awards.

The Wynnstay Hotel And Wayfarer Wool Shop, two separate buildings, were once connected by an archway, through which coaches and horses entered to the rear of the properties, where there were stables. The present Wayfarers shop is shown in the title deeds as an outbuilding consisting of "an old saddle room, l with a room over and Gentleman's Convenience".

The Wynnstay Hotel, now a private house, is first recorded in 1549 and known for many years as the Cross Foxes, which formed the heraldic arms of the Wynnstay family, which originated from Wrexham. Its members boasted they could travel from Chester to the Llŷn Peninsula without once leaving their own land. It was an important coaching inn for Ruthin to Denbigh travellers and served the Ruthin, Mold and Chester Royal Mail service. The pub in its heyday had a bowling green and tennis courts, and a central porch demolished in 1969.

Plas Coch (also known as the Conservative Club) is a Grade II listed building of medieval origin and a former 17th-century town house. It was rebuilt in 1613 using red sandstone from the castle and became home to the castle Constable. The building has two storeys with attics and four large windows on each floor. In 1963 it became a banqueting hall owned by Rees Jones, who used to trade at the village hall in Llanfair. It became the Conservative Club in 1977, and having been slightly altered, now offers all-round function facilities.

=== Other areas ===
The Spread Eagle recalls the coat-of-arms of the Goodwin family. Formerly an inn, records show it traded only from 1792 to 1915, after which it became a temperance hotel, then a retail shop.

=== Rose Cottage ===
Rose Cottage is a privately owned residence and a Grade II* listed building on the corner of Rhos Street and Haulfryn. It is listed as an "exceptional survival of a medieval cruck-framed hall-house of relatively low status, retaining its plan-form, character and detail".

=== Scott House ===
Situated in the Corwen Road just past Ruthin Castle, Scott House was built 1933 to house the nursing staff of Duff House Sanatorium, which acquired Ruthin Castle and 475 acres (192 ha) of land for their private clinic in April 1923. The Grade II listed building set in landscaped grounds was later divided into flats.

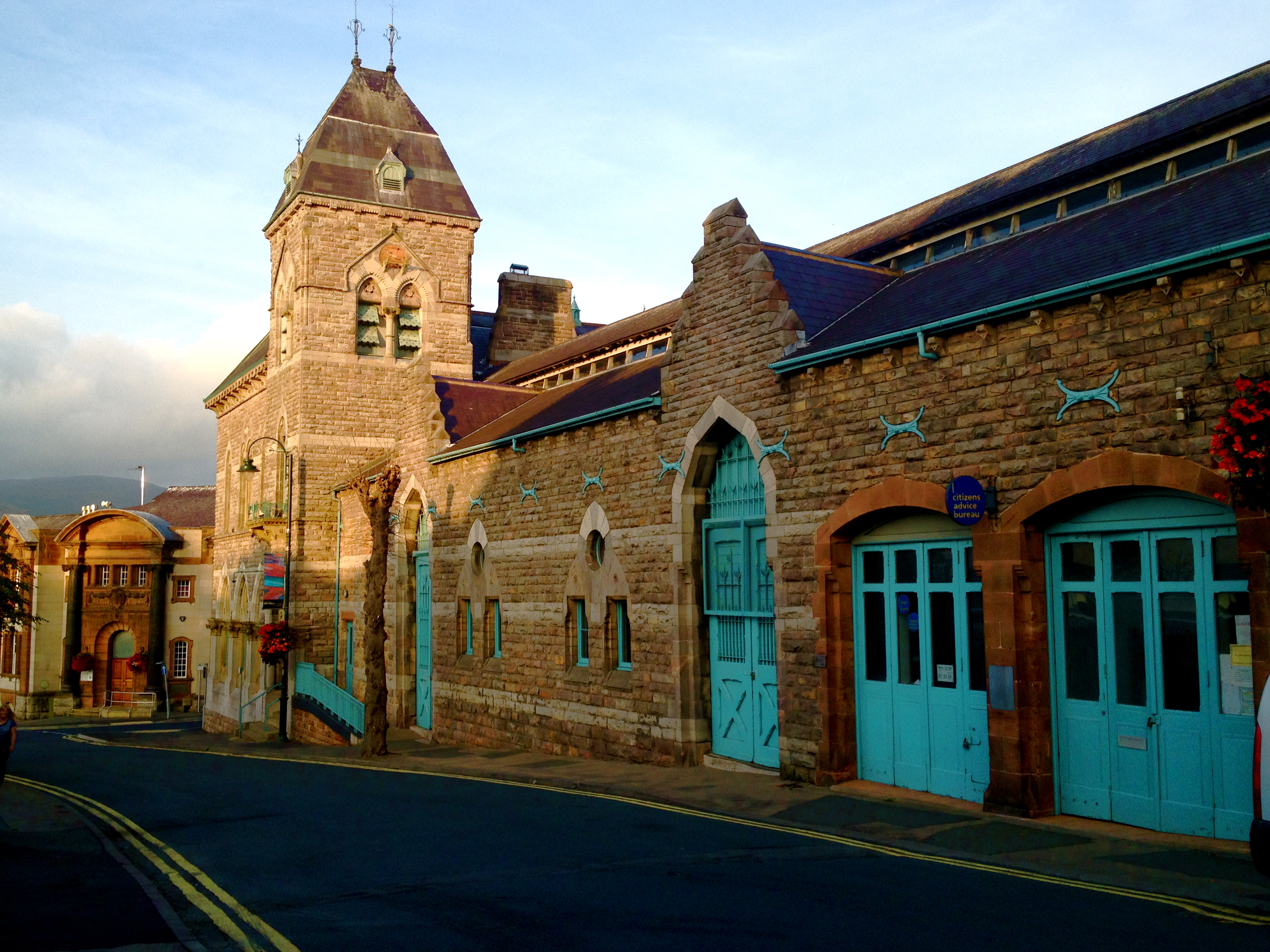
Ruthin Town Hall

=== The Town Hall ===
Ruthin Town Hall is located in Market Street. It was designed by J. W. Poundley and D. Walker in the High Victorian Gothic style and completed in 1865.

== Notable people ==
See Category:People from Ruthin

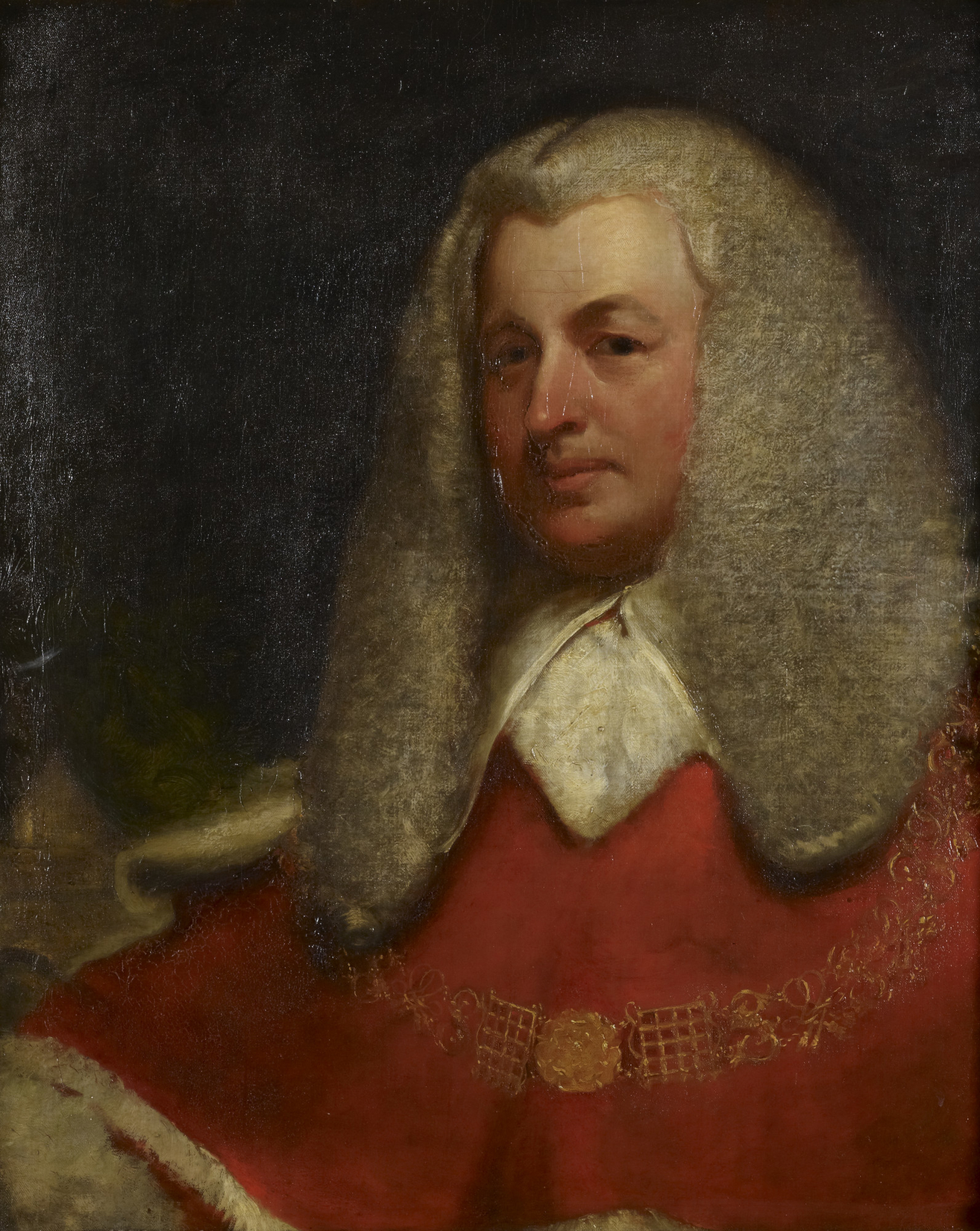
Lloyd Kenyon, 1st Baron Kenyon, painting ca.1800

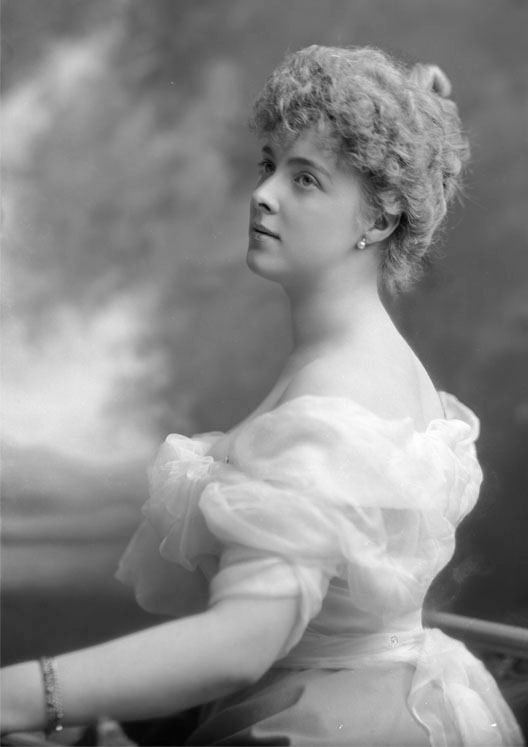
Daisy, Princess of Pless, 1898

- Ida de Grey (1368 in Ruthin Castle – 1426), a Cambro-Norman noblewoman
- Sir Thomas Exmewe (ca.1454–1529), Lord Mayor of London 1517–18
- John B. Evans (1938–2004), media executive
- Anne Grey, Baroness Hussey (c.1490–1545), English noblewoman and attendant to Mary Tudor
- Gabriel Goodman (1528–1601), Dean of Westminster, re-founded Ruthin School
- Godfrey Goodman (1582/3 – 1656), Anglican Bishop of Gloucester.
- Lloyd Kenyon, 1st Baron Kenyon (1732–1802), politician and barrister, went to Ruthin School.
- Joseph Ablett (1773–1848), philanthropist, purchased Llanbedr Hall in Llanbedr Dyffryn Clwyd
- Dorothea Eliza Smith (1804–1864), a botanical artist noted for painting South American fruit.
- Daisy, Princess of Pless (1873 in Ruthin Castle – 1943), society beauty, wife of Prince Hans Heinrich XV von Hochberg
- Wynn Edwards (1842–1900), American farmer and politician
- Stanley J. Weyman (1855–1928), English novelist, lived in Ruthin for 33 years and died there.
- Sir Henry Haydn Jones MP (1863–1950), politician, slate quarry owner, and owner of the Talyllyn Railway
- Władysław Raczkiewicz (1885–1947), the first president of the Polish government in exile, died at Ruthin Castle.
- Hafina Clwyd (1936–2011), journalist, town councillor, then mayor of Ruthin (2008–2009)
- Cynthia Lennon (1939–2015), first wife of John Lennon, settled in Ruthin. Her son, musician Julian Lennon (born 1963) attended Ruthin School.
- Robin Llwyd ab Owain (born 1959), author, poet, and Wikipedian, lives in Ruthin.
- Robat Arwyn, Welsh Language music composer (born 1959)
- Rhys Meirion (born 1966), English National Opera classical tenor; taught near Ruthin
- Actors Rhys Ifans (born 1967) and his brother Llŷr Ifans (born 1968) come from Ruthin.
- Seren Gibson (born 1988), glamour model, attended Ysgol Brynhyfryd.

=== Sport ===
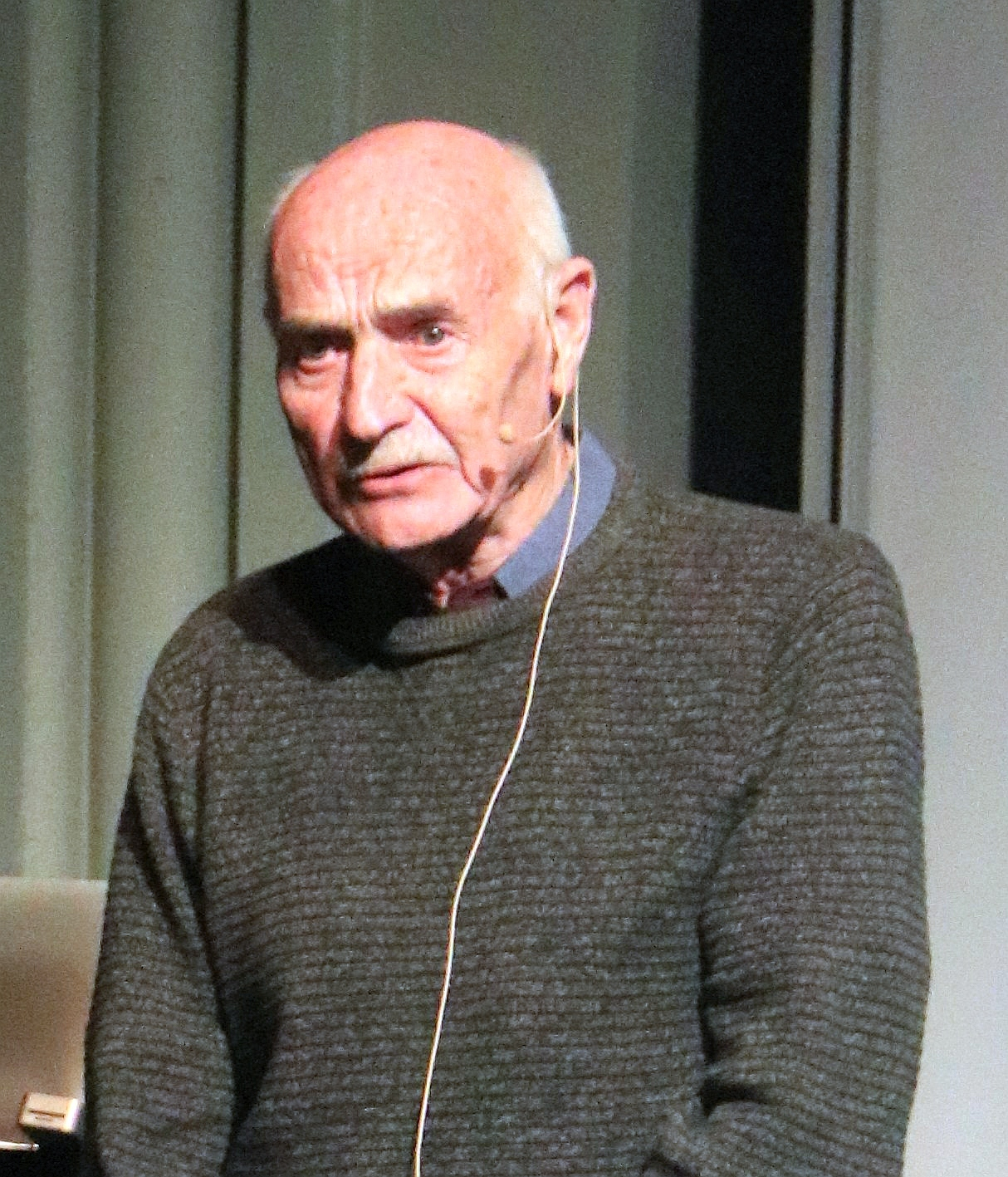
Eric Jones, 2019

- John Challen (1863–1937), amateur sportsman, played first-class cricket and football
- Charles Foweraker (1877–1950), football manager of Bolton Wanderers F.C. from 1919 to 1944
- Eric Jones (born 1935), climber, skydiver and BASE jumper.
- Doug Dailey (born 1944), racing cyclist
- Tom Pryce (1949–1977), Formula One racing driver
- Eifion Lewis-Roberts (born 1981), rugby union player for Ruthin RFC, lives in Llanbedr Dyffryn Clwyd.
- Rob Higgitt (born 1981), Scarlets rugby union centre, a former resident.
- Neil Taylor (born 1989), footballer with 338 club caps and 43 for Wales, attended Ysgol Brynhyfryd.

== Geography ==
Ruthin is situated on the River Clwyd, at the point where it enters the low-lying pastures of the Vale of Clwyd. The Clwydian Range lies to the east and the Clocaenog Forest and Denbigh Moors to the west.

By road, Ruthin is 8 miles (13 km) south-east of Denbigh, 12 miles (19 km) north of Corwen, 10 miles (16 km) west of Mold and 14 miles (23 km) east of Cerrigydrudion.

The nearest major urban centres are Wrexham at 17 miles (27 km), Rhyl at 18 miles (29 km), Chester at 23 miles (37 km) and Liverpool at 34 miles (55 km) to the north-east. Ruthin is skirted by villages such as Llanbedr Dyffryn Clwyd, Pwllglas and Rhewl.

== Twin town ==
Ruthin is twinned with Brieg in Brittany, France.

== See also ==
- Peers Memorial
- Ruthin Town Hall
- Castle Hotel
- Isaac Clarke (publisher)
- The Morning Star, Ruthin
- 2 & 2A Well Street, Ruthin
