= Nos. 33, 35 & 37 Clwyd Street, Ruthin =

Building in Denbighshire, Wales

33, 35 & 37 Clwyd Street
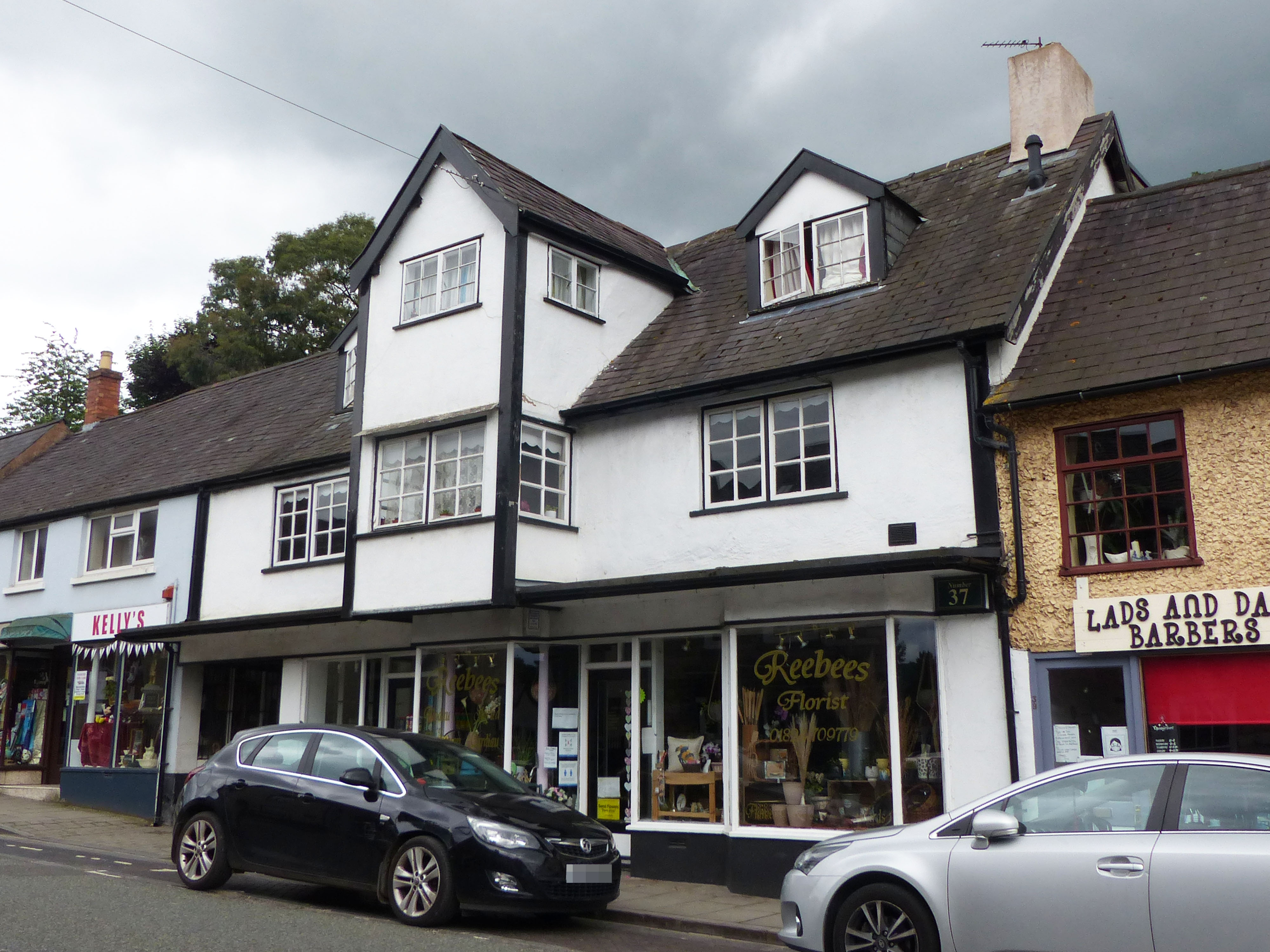
- The building in 2021
- Interactive map of the 33, 35 & 37 Clwyd Street area

General information
- Location: Ruthin, Wales
- Coordinates: 53.1133°N 3.3117°W
- Construction started: 16th century

Listed Building – Grade II
- Official name: 35&37 Clwyd Street
- Designated: 16 May 1978
- Reference no.: 87299

Nos. 33, 35 & 37 Clwyd Street is a 16th-century timber-framed building in Ruthin, Denbighshire. It was Grade II listed on 16 May 1978. Today, it is used as a shop.

Now a shopping precinct, the building dates back to the 16th century and has examples of wattle and daub just inside the building on the right-hand side. The building was remodelled in the early 19th century when it became the "Cross Key's Coaching Inn" serving the Ruthin to Chester route with a change of horses in Mold and last licensed in 1905. It later became a temperance commercial hotel and was home to one of the three Ruthin Friendly Societies, which were groups of male workers of similar background who contributed small amounts of money on a weekly basis for insurance against injury and old age. At a later date it was the offices of Ruthin Rural District Council.

The official hangman, Sam Burrows, stayed here in 1824 for several nights to prepare for the execution of an Irish highwayman, John Connor.
