= Seven Eyes =

Building in Denbighshire, Wales

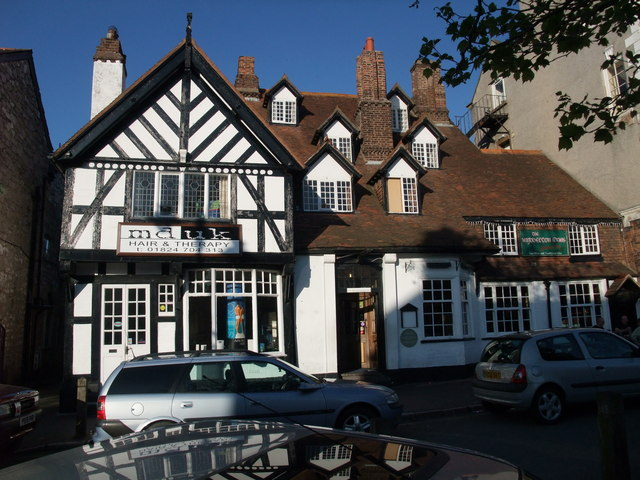

- Location within Wales

General information
- Status: Completed
- Location: Ruthin, Denbighshire, Wales
- Coordinates: 53.114785°N 3.310352°W

Listed Building – Grade II*
- Official name: Seven Eyes
- Designated: 04 July 1966
- Reference no.: 918

Seven Eyes (also known as the Myddleton Arms) is a Grade II* listed building in the community of Ruthin, Denbighshire, Wales, which dates back to the 16th century. It was listed by Cadw (Reference Number 918) in 1966. The property was acquired in 1595 by Sir Hugh Myddleton who provided London with its first fresh water supply and remodelled in the mid-17th century by Sir Richard Clough, in a similar fashion to his Bachegraig hall.

The multi-dormered tiled-roof building, also known as "The Eyes of Ruthin" because of the seven dormer windows, was originally framed with timber but replaced with brick in the late 18th century. The Dutch-influenced, long, steep roof is attributed to Sir Richard Clough, an Elizabethan merchant. It has four tiers of dormer windows, each at a different elevation, known locally as the seven eyes of Ruthin.

The interior features of the building include three tiers of dormer windows set within the tiled roof and the spere truss (or aisle-truss), which is clearly visible upstairs.

The exact dating of the house is unknown; what is certain is that the core of the house was a medieval hall-house type, now difficult to recognise because of the many alterations that have taken place. In one of the rooms is a mural bearing, in moulding, the date 1657 and the Langford coat-of-arms. The Langfords were brought to Ruthin by the de Greys in the 15th century and served as constables of Ruthin Castle. The property is said to have been purchased by Sir Hugh Myddleton in 1595. Sir Hugh virtually bankrupted himself in providing London with its first fresh water. Originally from a Denbigh family and a Denbigh benefactor in 1622, he was made a baronet as Sir Hugh Myddleton of Ruthin, citizen and Goldsmith of London.

In the early 2000s, the hotel was purchased by Stephanie Booth.

== Location ==
This building is at 10 St. Peters Square, Ruthin, Clwyd, LL15 1AA
