= 2 Well Street, Ruthin =

Building in Denbighshire, Wales

2 Well Street
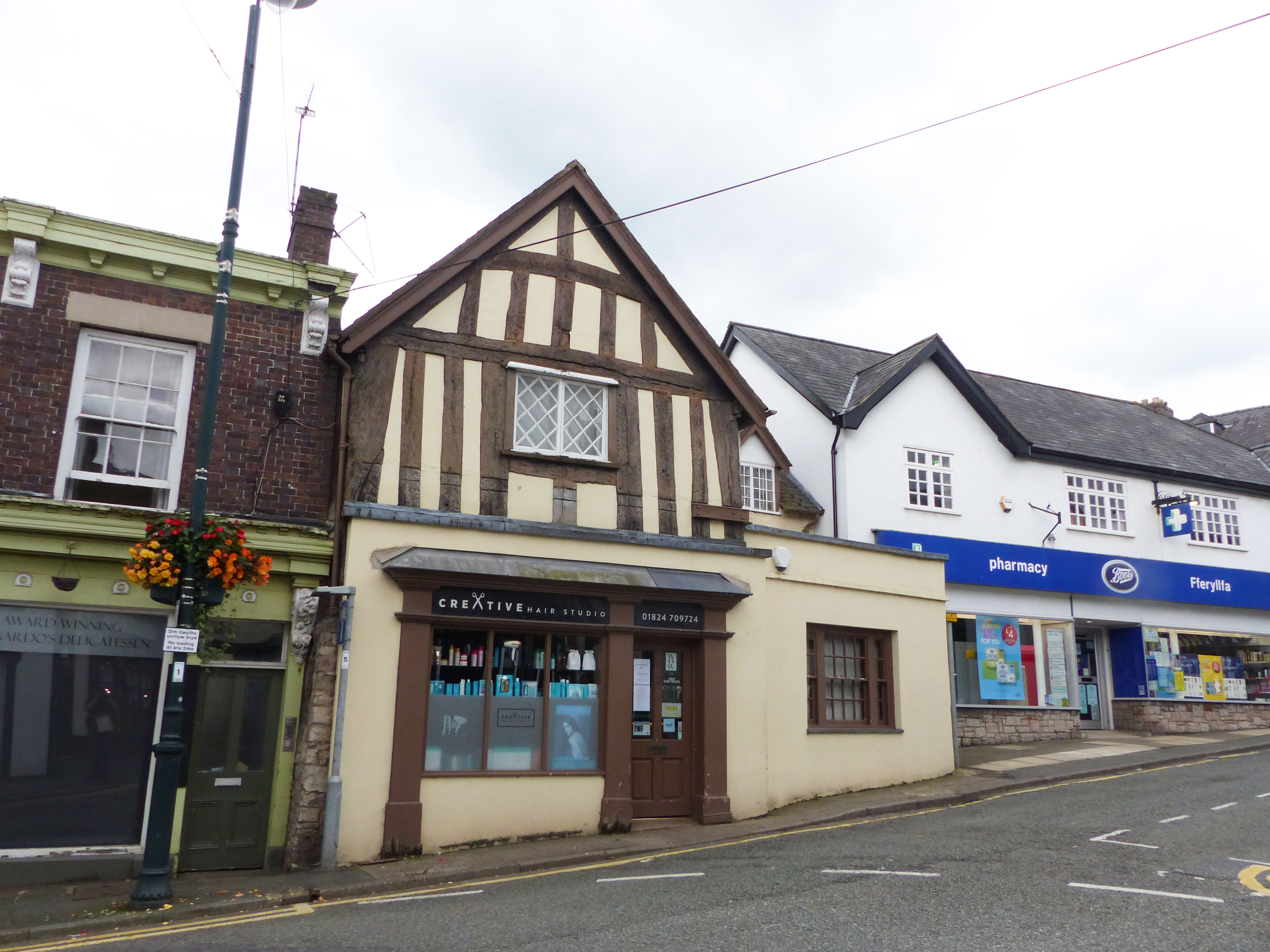
- 2 Well Street in 2021

- Location within Denbighshire

General information
- Status: Completed
- Location: 2 Well Street, Ruthin, Wales
- Coordinates: 53.11413°N 3.31016°W
- Completed: 19th century
- Renovated: 1904

Other information
- Parking: No

Listed Building – Grade II
- Official name: 2 Well Street
- Designated: 16 May 1978
- Reference no.: 935

2 Well Street is a Grade II listed building in the community of Ruthin, Denbighshire, Wales, which dates back to the 15th century. It was listed by Cadw (Reference Number 935) on 16 May 1978.

Now trading as the "Creative Hair Studio", the site was originally a public house (the 'Ruth Inn') built in 1401, possibly the oldest pub in Ruthin; it ceased trading in 1773. In 1850 the building was transformed into a draper's, later becoming the town post office until 1904.

Today's post office in St Peter's Square is reputed to be on the site of the medieval Carmelite Priory of White Friars said to be founded and built by Reginald de Grey and was partly destroyed by the Reformation of Churches. De Grey also provided a large piece of land close to the castle known as Whitefriars. A horse feed chandler's stood next to the public house; both buildings were destroyed by fire in 1904 when the present post office was built to replace this one.
