= Ruthin Town Hall =

Municipal building in Ruthin, Wales

- Neuadd y Dref Rhuthun (Welsh)
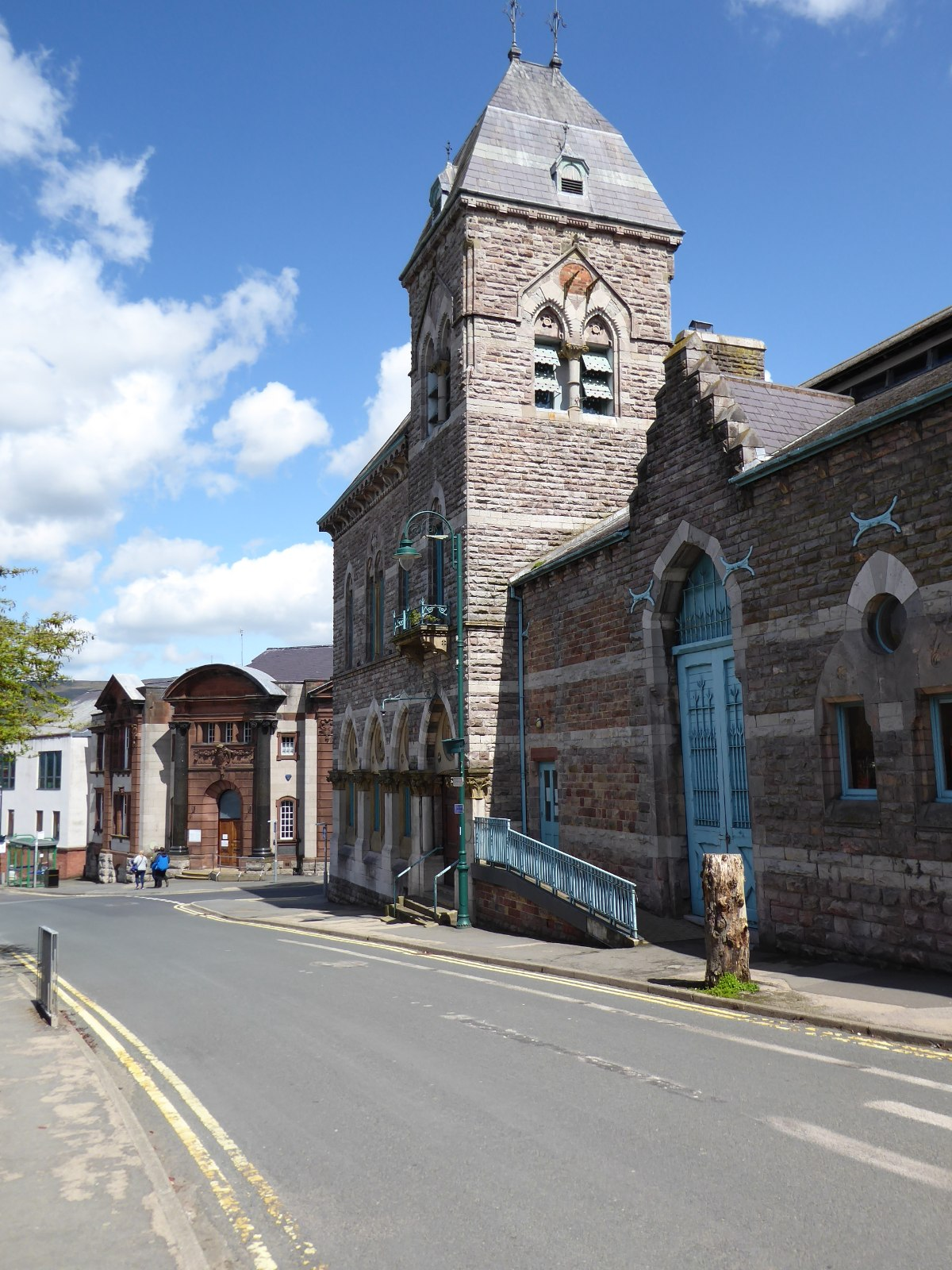
- Town hall with tower; on the right (large doors) is the market hall: previously Ruthin Fire Brigade.
- Interactive map of the Ruthin Town Hall area

General information
- Architectural style: High Victorian Gothic style
- Location: Ruthin, Denbighshire, Wales
- Coordinates: 53.114726°N 3.309274°W

Listed Building – Grade II
- Official name: Ruthin Town Hall
- Designated: 4 December 1973
- Reference no.: 875
- Construction started: 1837
- Completed: 1865

Technical details
- Structural system: stone

Design and construction
- Architect: J W Poundley and D Walker

Ruthin Town Hall (Welsh: Neuadd y Dref Rhuthun) is a municipal facility in Market Street, Ruthin, Denbighshire, Wales. It is a Grade II listed building.

== History ==
The building was commissioned to replace the ageing 17th century town hall in the middle of St Peter's Square. After deciding the old town hall was inadequate for their needs, civic leaders chose to procure a new town hall: the site they selected had previously formed part of the Ruthin Castle Estate: the vendor, Frederick West, insisted that the old town hall be demolished and that the site remain vacant in order to create an uninterrupted view of St Peter's Church from his home, Ruthin Castle.

The foundation stone for the "new market hall and stock exchange" was laid by the mayor, Mr. R.G. Ellis, on 27 October 1863. It was designed by J W Poundley and D Walker in the High Victorian Gothic style and built by William Roberts and Joseph Holland of Ruthin; the contractors got into financial difficulty so delaying completion of the building until September 1865. The design involved an asymmetrical frontage with four bays facing Market Street; the left section of three bays featured arched windows on the ground floor and four narrow windows on the first floor; the right end bay feature an arched doorway on the ground floor, a narrow window on the first floor and a tower above. The arched windows and doorway incorporated carvings by the sculptor, Edward Griffith. Internally, the principal rooms were the council chamber, a public hall, the town clerk's office and an armoury for the local rifle volunteers.

An annexe to the west of the building was used as a market hall and also accommodated the fire brigade until it moved to Park Road in February 1971. The building also served as the headquarters of Ruthin Town Council until 1974. Local government reorganisation in 1974 abolished the municipal borough of Ruthin and transferred district-level functions to the larger Glyndŵr Borough Council, which based itself at the former Denbighshire County Council's County Offices, further along Market Street.

A major programme of refurbishment works to the town hall was completed at a cost of £400,000 in October 1993. Denbighshire Voluntary Services Council was awarded a grant of £100,000 in November 2019 to convert the market hall into a community and business hub. In 2022, Denbighshire Voluntary Services Council employed the services of Ruthin Artisan Markets CIC, an already existing successful market company running in the town, to run the Ruthin Market Hall. In April 2023, Denbighshire Voluntary Services Council ceased to have an operational control of the market hall and handed over the reins to Ruthin Artisan Markets CIC to continue to run it as a weekly market and occasional events space.

In 2023, Ruthin Artisan Markets CIC took over the lease of Ruthin Town Hall with a view to merging access to both buildings and turning the currently empty building into a community hub with enhanced facilities for people of all abilities. Ruthin Artisan Markets CIC announced plans to create new access at the back of the market hall for ease in deliveries and collections, to improve disability access in the front of the building and to create a good car parking space at the rear. Ruthin Artisan Markets CIC also intends to open up the sprung dance floor on the top floor to allow for community get-togethers and to host events for people of all ages, with community cinema nights and more.

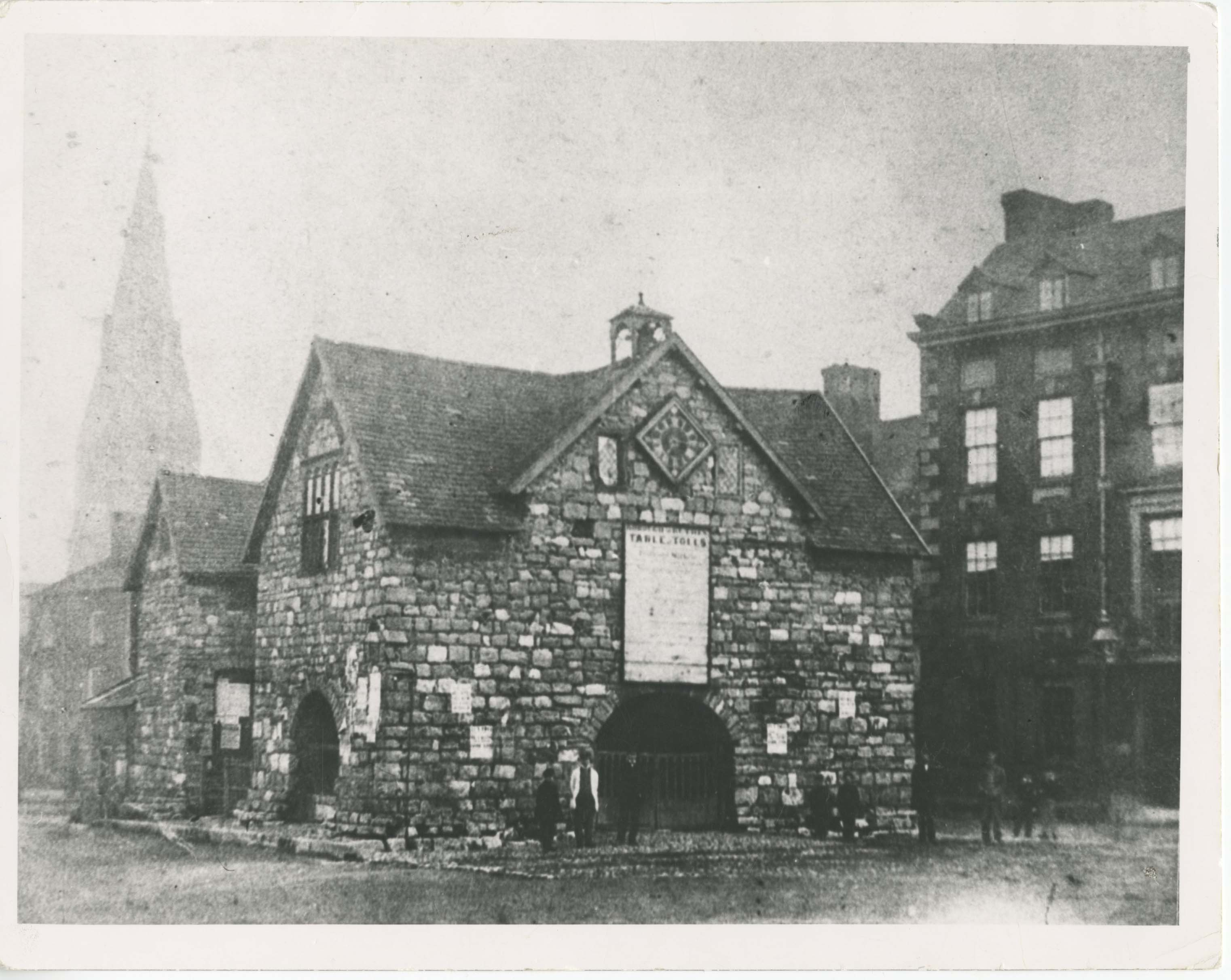
The Old Town Hall, taken down in 1863.

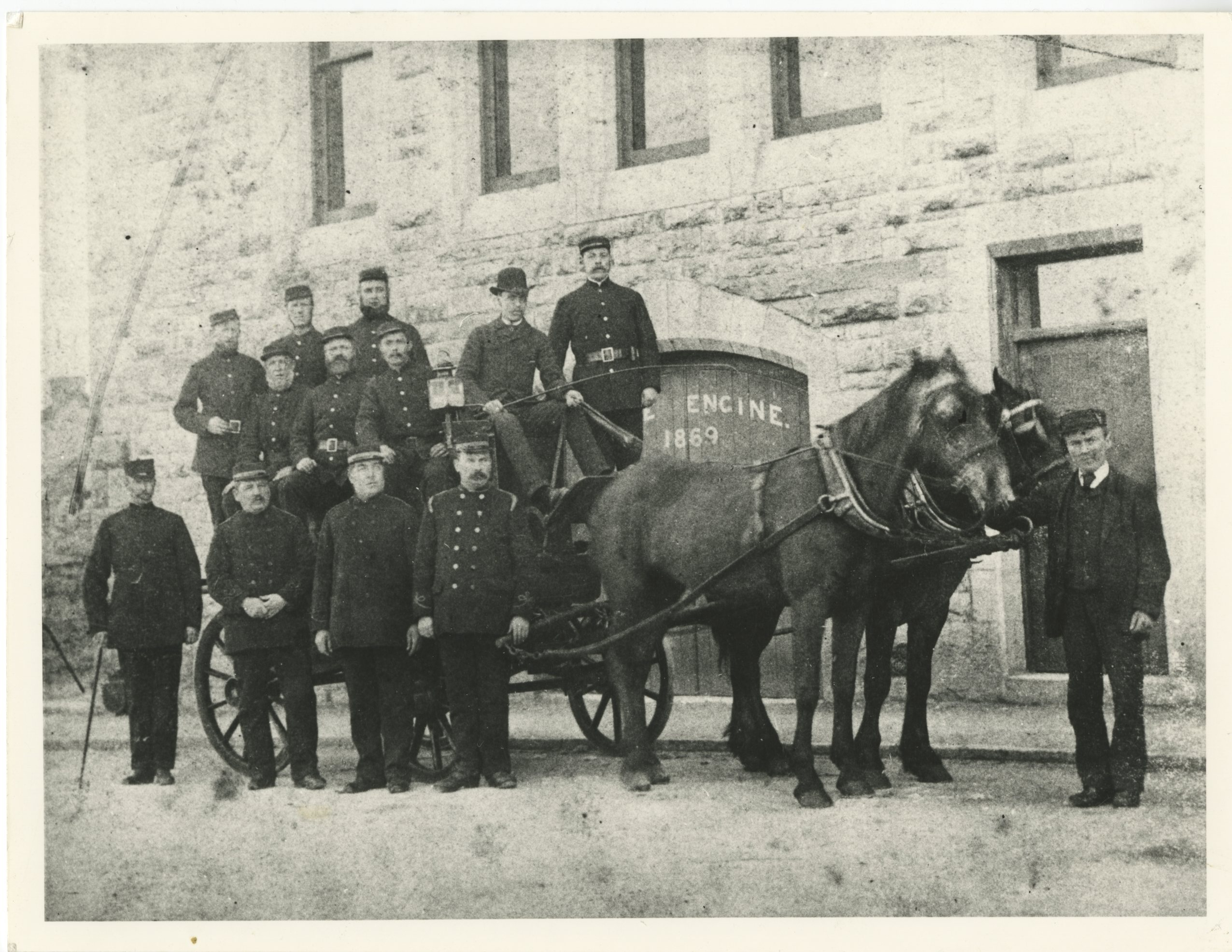
Ruthin Fire Brigade c. 1890

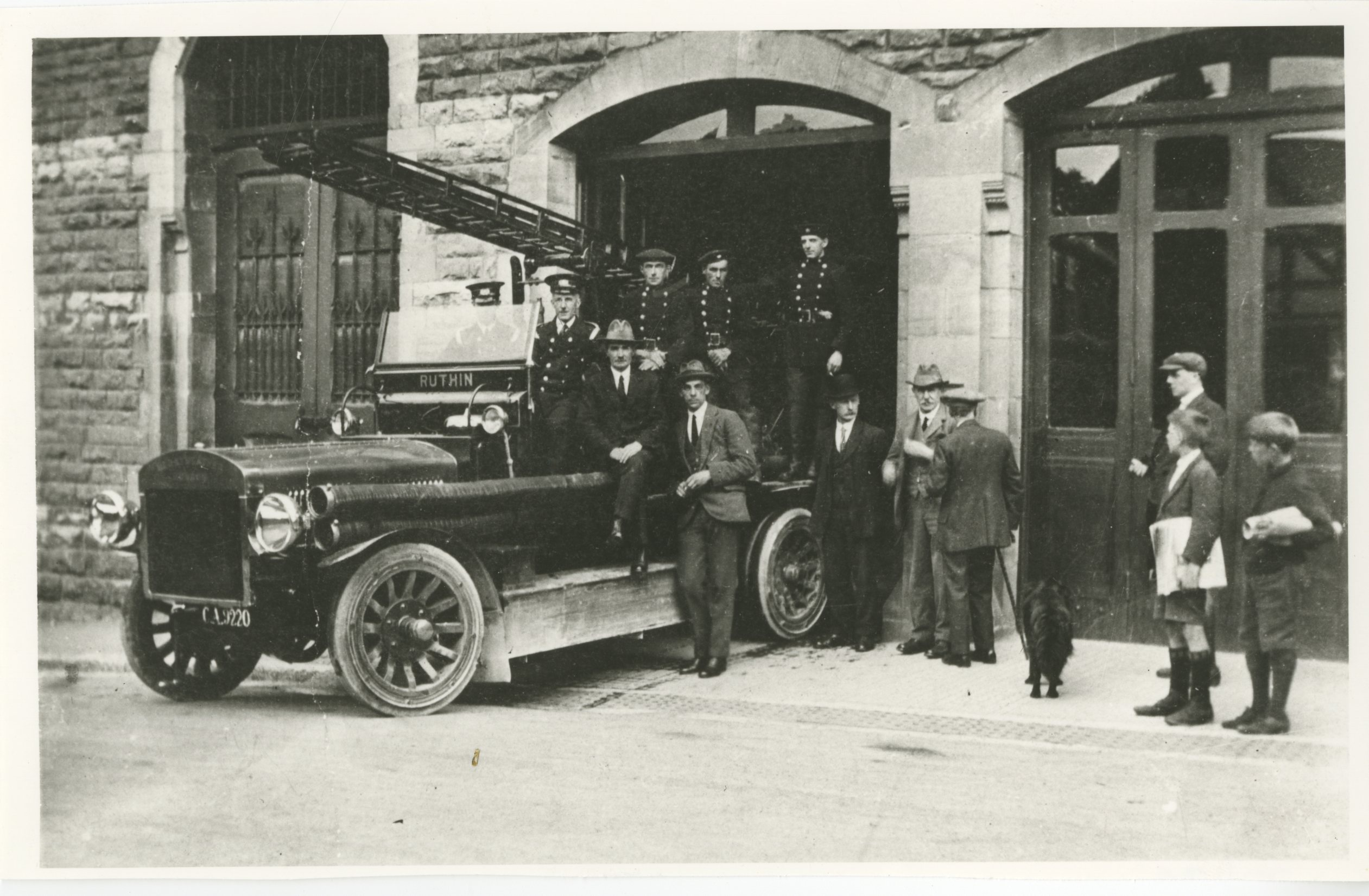
Ruthin Fire Brigade c. 1930
