= Old Courthouse, Ruthin =

Building in Ruthin, Wales

The Old Courthouse
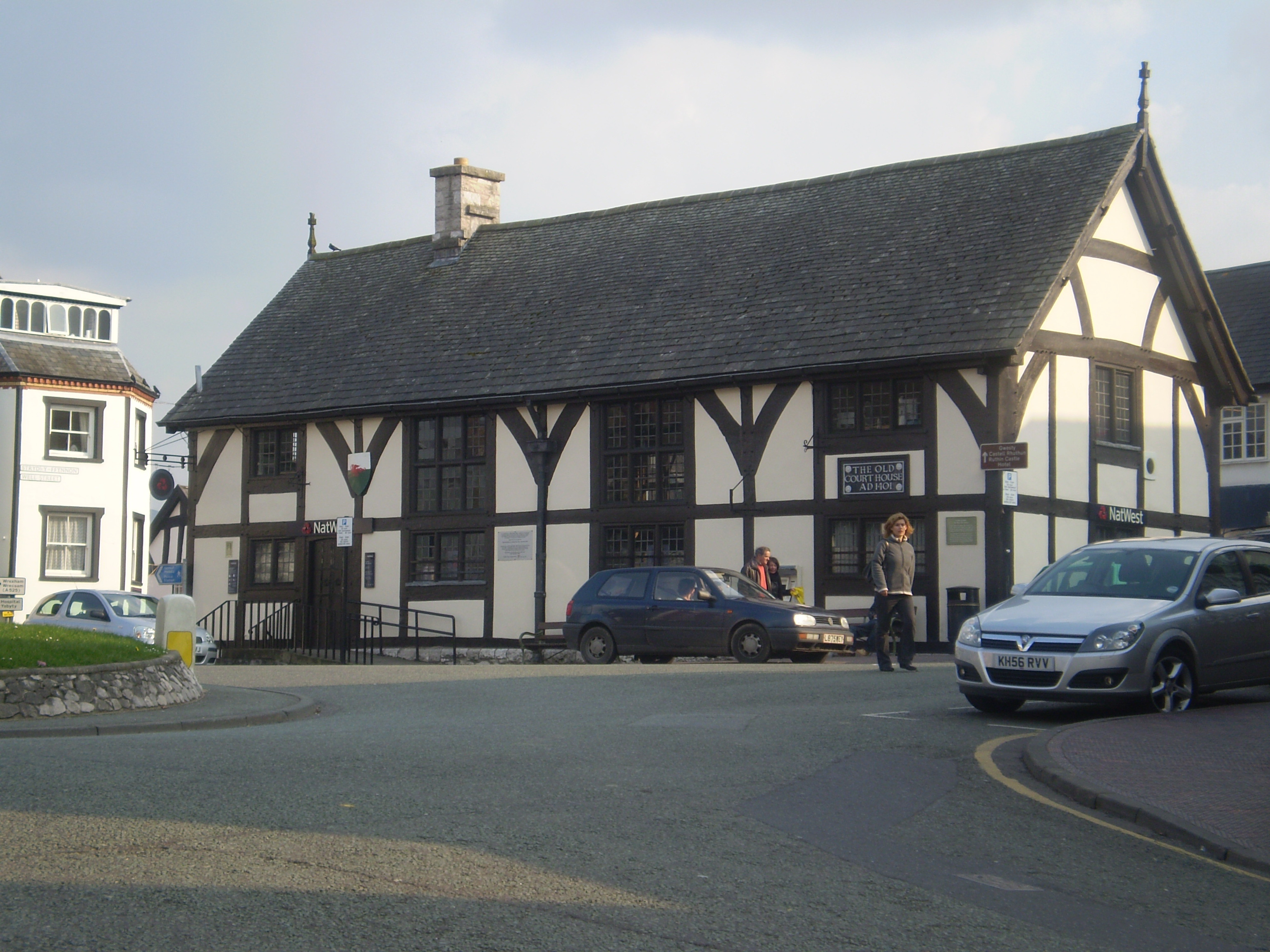
- Interactive map of the The Old Courthouse area

General information
- Location: Ruthin, Denbighshire, Wales
- Coordinates: 53.114254°N 3.310426°W
- Construction started: 1401
- Completed: 1421

Technical details
- Structural system: wood

The Old Courthouse is a former judicial building in St Peter's Square in Ruthin, Denbighshire, North Wales. It is a Grade II* listed building. After many years in use as commercial premises, the building was brought back into public use in 2019 and now serves as a community venue and meeting place of Ruthin Town Council.

== History ==
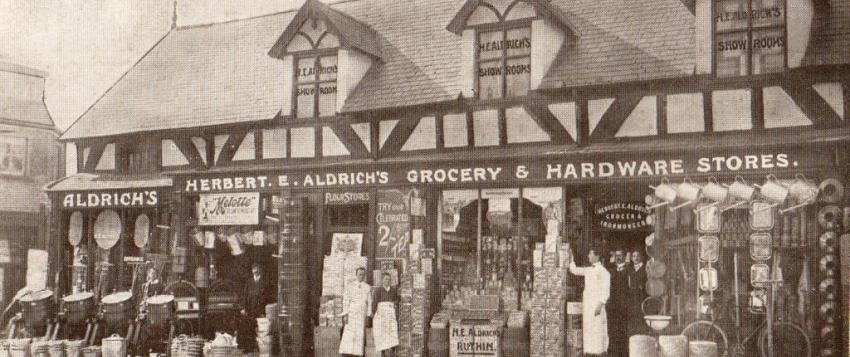
The Old Courthouse around 1895: "Aldrich's Grocery and Hardware Stores".

The current building was built to replace an earlier structure, owned by the de Grey family, was notable for being the first building to be attacked at the outset of Owain Glyndŵr's revolt on 6 September 1400. The new building was completed in 1421. Visible within are fine old roof timbers, and on the north-west outside corner is the stump of a gallows beam. It served as the courthouse until 1663 when a new town hall was built on the square.

The old courthouse was also in commercial use during the 18th century: in 1741 a petition was raised by butchers of the town and given to the owner Richard Myddleton complaining their meat was exposed to all elements of weather. This resulted in the building of “the shambles” a lean-to on the north face of the building (Welsh: Pendist) a two-storey construction, photos show three dormer windows set into the roof. The butchers earned extra income by offering grandstand seating on the roof for views of the bear-baiting which took place on the Square. In the 19th century it served as a grocery: "Aldrich's Grocery and Hardware Stores". Then, in 1926 it was converted into a branch of the National Westminster Bank to the design of Frank Shayler and served in that role until its closure in 2017.

The building was purchased in 2019 by Ruthin Town Council and refurbished to become a community facility and meeting place for the town council. Following the refurbishment the building now hosts a collaborative workspace, retail showcase, information point and the ’Stori Rhuthun' Heritage and art exhibition space in the main hall.

== See also ==
- Siop Nain
- Ruthin Town Hall
