= The Old Mill, Ruthin =

Building in Denbighshire, Wales

The Old Mill
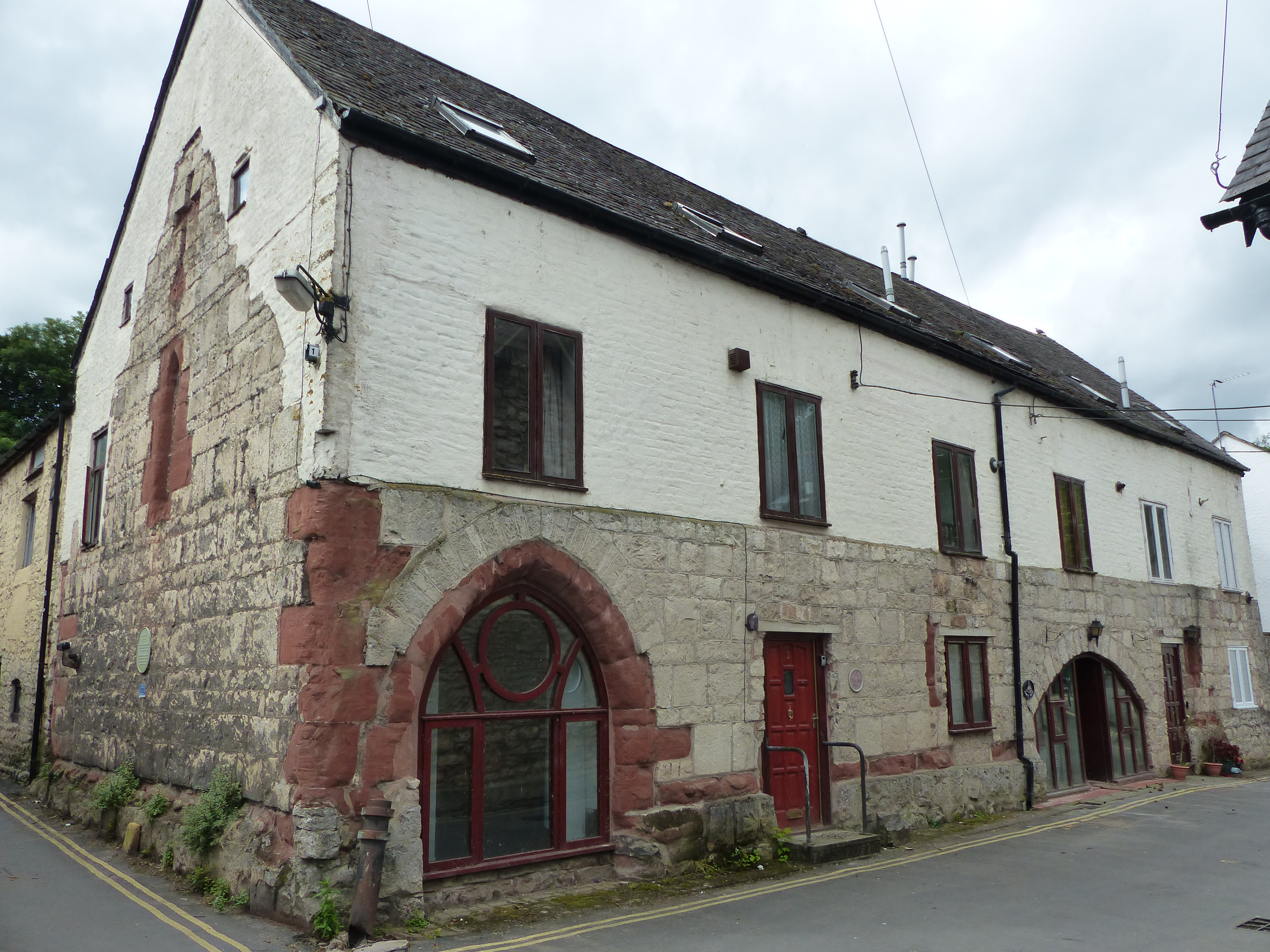
- The mill building in 2021
- Interactive map of the The Old Mill area

General information
- Location: Ruthin, Denbighshire, Wales
- Coordinates: 53.113024°N 3.314303°W
- Construction started: 14th century
- Completed: 14th century

Technical details
- Structural system: wood and stone

Listed Building – Grade II
- Official name: Former Mill
- Designated: 24 October 1950
- Reference no.: 876

The Old Mill, Ruthin, Denbighshire, North Wales, probably dates from around 1300. The Warden of Ruthin, the early 19th-century Archdeacon Newcome, noted that the building had been used as a garrison chapel. There are two early English pointed arches and one gable end has a blocked lancet window, with a sunken cross above. The watermill was removed from the mill during the 1950s (the Royal Commission on the Ancient and Historical Monuments of Wales says c. 1947) and Mill Street runs to the side of the old mill.

It was designated as a Grade II listed building on 24 October 1950.

== River Clwyd ==
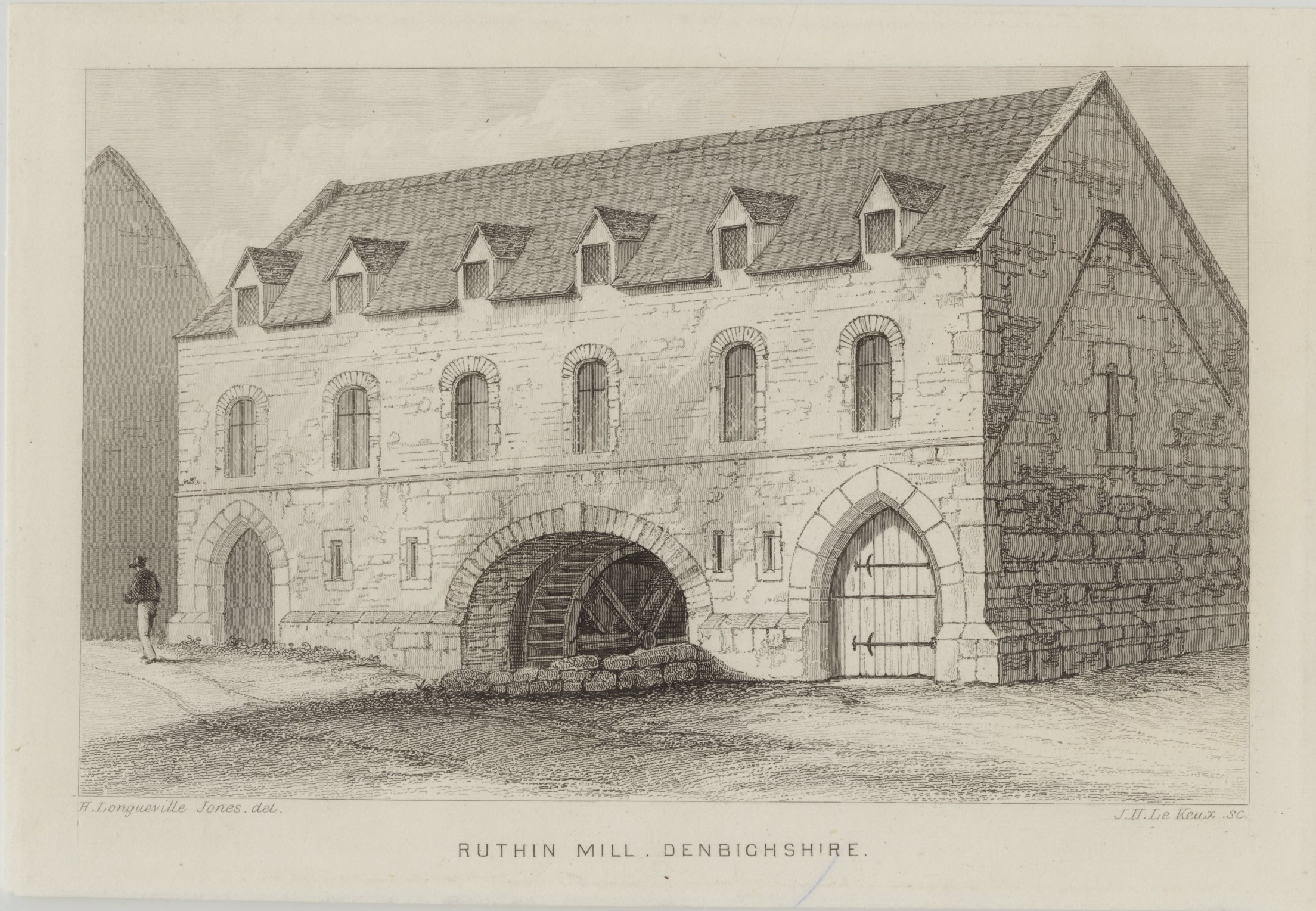
A 19th-century drawing of the mill

Power for the mill came from the River Clwyd, which runs nearby; part of the leat is still visible within the grouds of Ruthin Castle, with which the mill was associated. The river also serviced the woollen and leather industries in Borthyn and Mwrog Streets. The car park at Cae Ddôl is known locally as Crispin Yard, named after St Crispin, the patron saint of shoemakers, and reflecting the leather industry that thrived in the area. The river was bridged by a water gate; there is no evidence when this was demolished. Today a road bridge, known as Pont Howkin, crosses the river; it was originally built in 1771 and was formerly known as Pont Newydd.
