= Thomas Exmewe =

Lord Mayor of London, 1517

Sir Thomas Exmewe
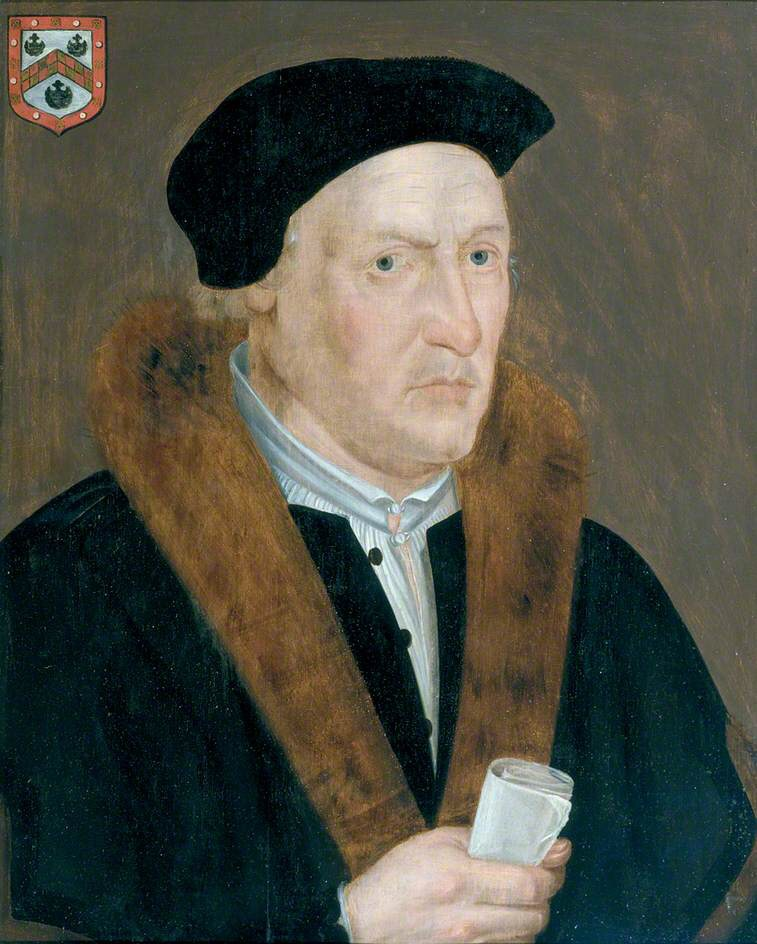
- Posthumous portrait of Sir Thomas Exmewe, attributed to John Bettes the Elder, c. 1550, Guildhall Art Gallery.

Lord Mayor of London
- In office 1517-1518
- Preceded by: John Rest
- Succeeded by: Thomas Mirfyn

Sheriff of London
- In office 1509-1510
- Preceded by: William Butler
- Succeeded by: George Monoux

Personal details
- Born: c. 1450 Ruthin, Denbighshire, Wales, UK
- Died: 1529 (aged 78–79)

Sir Thomas Exmewe (born c. 1454 in Ruthin, Denbighshire) was a member of the Goldsmiths Company. He was elected Sheriff of London in 1508 and Lord Mayor of London on 5 December 1517. He became the first Lord Mayor of London whose portrait is known to have been painted. The posthumous portrait, dated c. 1550, is now in the collection of the Guildhall Art Gallery and has been attributed to John Bettes the Elder.

Exmewe died in 1529. Thomas Exmewe was married to Elizabeth, formerly the wife of John West.

== See also ==
- List of lord mayors of London
- List of sheriffs of London
