= Ysgol Brynhyfryd =

Location
- Ffordd yr Wyddgrug/Mold Road; Ruthin, Denbighshire, LL15 1EG; Wales; 53°06′54″N 3°17′54″W

Information
- Motto: Nid Dysg Heb Foes
- Local authority: Denbighshire
- Department for Education URN: 401696 Tables
- Head teacher: Trefor Jones
- Website: www.ysgolbrynhyfryd.com

Ysgol Brynhyfryd is a bilingual Welsh and English co-educational comprehensive school in the town of Ruthin in Denbighshire, North Wales. The school serves the community of Ruthin and the many surrounding villages including the rural districts of Corwen, Carrog and Gwyddelwern.

As of 2023, the school has a total of 1053 pupils on roll. 189 of those are in the sixth form. As of 2025, the headteacher is Trefor Jones.

== History ==
Ysgol Brynhyfryd was established in 1899 as Ruthin County School for Girls. Until 1930, the school had the option for girls to board. It became co-educational, as Ruthin School, in 1938. The then headmistress, Catherine Parry, was not allowed to apply for the post of head of the co-educational school, as a man was thought more suitable.

In 1945 the school was renamed Ruthin County Grammar School. By 1948 it was being called Brynhyfryd Grammar School. In 1954 it became bilateral, which meant that children who had not passed the eleven plus could attend the school, as well as those who had. It became a comprehensive school, using the Welsh form of its name, in 1967.

== Curriculum and academic performance ==
Like most secondary schools in Wales, at Key Stage 3 and Key Stage 4 Ysgol Brynhyfryd offers a total of 13 subjects including Welsh (first and second language), English, Mathematics, Science, Technology, Information Communication Technology, History, Geography, RE, French, Art, Music, Modern Languages and PE.

Brynhyfryd is a bilingual school which has, in years 7 and 8, four Welsh forms and five English forms. As of 2023, 43.5% of pupils come from Welsh-speaking homes.

The school is considered successful, with 68% of pupils leaving with at least five A*-C GCSE grades, according to the Estyn inspection report in 2015.

== Facilities ==
The school has a theatre and arts complex, Theatre John Ambrose, named after a headteacher of the school in the 1980s and 1990s. This was opened by the actor Rhys Ifans, a former pupil of Ysgol Pentrecelyn and Ysgol Maes Garmon in Mold, but brought up in Ruthin.

== Controversies ==
Sources:

== Notable former pupils ==
- Charlie Caton, footballer
- Ian Flanagan, tennis player
- David Richards, motorsport executive
- Neil Taylor, footballer
