= Court of Great Sessions in Wales =

The Court of Great Sessions in Wales was the main court for the prosecution of felonies and serious misdemeanours in Wales between the Laws in Wales Act 1542 and the court's abolition by the Law Terms Act 1830. It had the same powers in civil law as the King's Bench in England, (it also had equity jurisdiction) and its criminal jurisdiction was equivalent to the English county assizes.

The court was established under the Laws in Wales Act 1542 which formally incorporated Wales within the English legal system. Of the 13 Welsh counties, 12 – that is, all except the County of Monmouth – formed new court circuits. These were Chester (comprising the counties of Flint, Denbigh and Montgomery); North Wales (Anglesea and the counties of Caernarvon and Merioneth); Brecon (the counties of Brecon, Glamorgan, and Radnor); and Carmarthen (the counties of Kayermarthen, Cardigan, and Pembroke). Monmouthshire was added to the Oxford circuit of the English Assizes. The sessions met twice a year in each county, administering English law but in English language, excluding much of the population from direct access. Of the 217 judges who sat on its benches in its 288 years of existence, only 30 were Welshmen and it is likely only a handful of the latter members of the higher gentry additionally spoke the native Welsh, in continued exclusion of the native culture and population.

According to historian John Davies, the continued treatment of Monmouthshire in this arrangement was the cause of the "notion" that "the county had been annexed by England" and attempted to be treated as though no longer part of Wales by the English. The National Library of Wales holds the surviving historical records of the Court of Great Sessions.
