= Richard Robinson (translator) =

English translator

- Occupations: Translator, author, and compiler

Richard Robinson (fl. 1576–1600) was an English translator, author, and compiler.

== Biography ==
Robinson was a freeman of the Leathersellers' Company, and in 1576 was residing in a chamber at the south side of St. Paul's. In the registers of St. Peter's, Cornhill (Harl. Soc.), there are several entries of the births and deaths of the children of Richard Robinson, skinner. In 1585 he is described as of Fryers (ib. p. 135). In 1595 he presented to Elizabeth the third part of his "Harmony of King David's Harp." In his manuscript "Eupolemia" he gives an amusing account of the queen's reception of the gift. His hope of pecuniary recognition was disappointed, and he was obliged to sell his books and the lease of his house in Harp Alley, Shoe Lane. He was a suitor to the queen for one of the twelve alms-rooms in Westminster. The poet Thomas Churchyard, with whom he co-operated in the translation from Emanuel van Meteren's "Historiæ Belgicæ" (1602), prefixed a poem in praise of him to Robinson's "Auncient Order of Prince Arthure." The supposition that he was the father of Richard Robinson, an actor in Shakespeare's plays, is not supported by any evidence (Collier, Memoirs of the Principal Actors in the Plays of Shakespeare).

Robinson was the author of:

- "Certain Selected Histories for Christian Recreations, with their severall Moralizations brought into English Verse," 1576, 8vo.
- "A Moral Methode of Civil Policie" (a translation of F. Patrizi's "Nine Books of a Commonwealth"), 1576, 4to.
- "Robinson's Ruby, an Historical Fiction, translated out of Latin Prose into English Verse, with the Prayer of the most Christian Poet Ausonius," 1577.
- "A Record of Ancyent Historyes, entituled in Latin Gesta Romanorum [by John Leland?], Translated, Perused, Corrected, and Bettered," 1577, 8vo.
- "The Dyall of Dayly Contemplacon for Synners, Moral and Divine Matter in English Prose and Verse, first published in print anno 1499, corrected and reformed for the time" (dedicated to Dean Nowell), 1578.
- "Melancthon's Prayers Translated .. into English" (dedicated to Sir Philip Sidney), 1579.
- "The Vineyard of Virtue, partly translated, partly collected out of the Bible and … other authors," 1579, 1591.
- "Melanchthon his Learned Assertion or Apology of the Word of God and of His Church," 1580.
- "Hemming's Exposition upon the 25th Psalm, translated into English," 1580.
- "A Learned and True Assertion of the Original Life, Actes, and Death of … Arthure," (a translation of John Leland's work), 1582.
- "Part of the Harmony of King David's Harp, conteining the first 21 Psalmes … expounded by Strigelius, translated by [Robinson]," 1582, 4to
- "Urbanus Regius, an Homely or Sermon of Good and Evil Angels … translated into English," 1583 (dedicated to Gabriel Goodman, dean of Westminster); later editions 1590 and 1593.
- "A Rare, True, and Proper Blazon of Coloures in Armoryes and Ensigns (Military)," 1583.
- "The Ancient Order Societie and Unitie Laudable of Prince Arthure … translated by (Robinson)," 1583, 4to.
- "The Solace of Sion and Joy of Jerusalem … being a Godly exposition of the 87th Psalme (by Urbanus Regius) … translated into English," 1587; later editions 1590, 1594.
- "A Proceeding in the Harmony of King David's Harp, being a 2nd portion of 13 Psalms more," 1590.
- "A Second Proceeding in the Harmony of King David's Harp," 1592.
- "A Third Proceeding …" 1595 (dedicated to Queen Elizabeth).
- "A Fourth Proceeding," 1596. 20. "A Fifth Proceeding," 1598.

The following works by Robinson in manuscript are contained in Royal MS. No. 18:

- "Two Several Surveys of the … Soldiers Mustered in London," 1588 and 1599.
- "An Account of the Three Expeditions of Sir Francis Drake," Latin.
- "An English Quid for a Spanish Quo … being an Account of the 11 Voyages of George, Earl of Cumberland" (also in Hist. MSS. Comm. 5th Rep. p. 304, 12th Rep. pt. i. p. 16).
- "Robinson's Eupolemia, Archippus, and Panoplia," being an account of his works, 1576–1602.
