= Nantclwyd y Dre =

Building in Ruthin, Denbighshire, Wales

Nantclwyd Y Dre
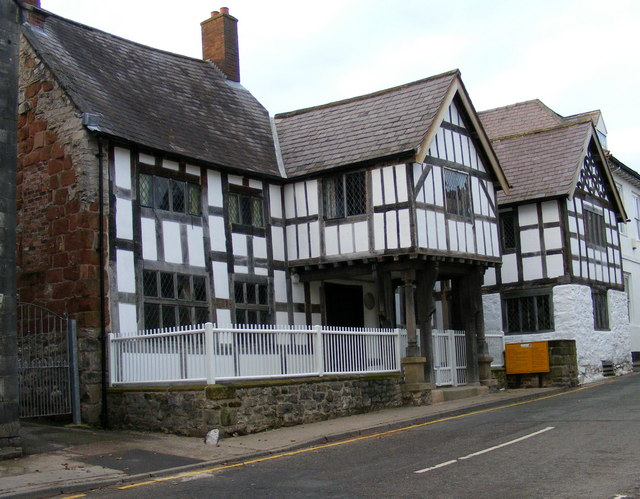
- Nantclwyd Y Dre looking North on Castle Street, Ruthin
- Interactive map of the Nantclwyd Y Dre area

General information
- Location: Ruthin, Denbighshire, Wales
- Coordinates: 53.113494°N 3.310821°W
- Construction started: 1435
- Completed: 15th century
- Client: Goronwy ap Madog

Technical details
- Structural system: Timber frame

Website
- https://www.denbighshire.gov.uk/en/leisure-and-tourism/museums-and-historic-houses/nantclwyd-y-dre/nantclwyd-y-dre.aspx

Listed Building – Grade I
- Official name: Nantclwyd House
- Designated: 24 October 1950
- Reference no.: 833

Nantclwyd y Dre (formerly known as Nantclwyd House) is a historic house and garden in Ruthin, Denbighshire, Wales. Recognised as one of the oldest timber-framed townhouses in Wales, its construction dates back to 1435. The property has undergone numerous changes and restorations over the centuries, reflecting various architectural styles and historical periods. Today, it serves as a historic house museum, offering visitors a glimpse into the life and times of its former inhabitants.

== History ==
Carbon dating of the timbers of the house have shown that the core structure was started in 1435/1436. This dates the property to the time after the destruction wrought by the army of Welsh prince Owain Glyndŵr, and the English-sponsored rebuilding of the affected Welsh towns.

In the 15th century Ruthin was a regional centre for weaving, and the land on which the house now stands then belonged to Welsh weaver Goronwy ap Madog and his English wife Suzanna. Lying just 100 metres (330 ft) north of the entrance to Ruthin Castle and with a street frontage, the scale and location of the site shows both the importance and wealth of the owner. The earliest part of the structure shows it to be part of a 15th-century cruck framed hall house which occupied the southern part of the present street-frontage, built using timber felled in the winter of 1434–5. The position of the structure as well as the width of the inner garden to the rear, suggest that the site was originally two burgage plots which dated from when the town was laid out in the 13th century, but were then combined to allow construction of the hall house.

Following Jacobean era enlargement, the major late Stuart period addition includes the distinctive pillared porch. The name Nantclwyd y Dre was probably bestowed on the property in the 1720s. During the Georgian era, the local Wynne family restored the property to habitable status. It was then converted into a girls school in the Victorian era, and from 1834 it also became the local lodge for visiting judges.

In 1925, existing tenant and retired civil engineer Clinton Holme bought the house, and in 1928 he removed the exterior render to expose the timber frames. He sold the property to Samuel Dyer Gough who continued the restoration, and made it into the local hub for the Arts and Crafts movement. In 1984 the Dyer Gough family sold the house and its gardens to Clwyd County Council. From the mid-2000s Denbighshire County Council started work on preserving the property.

The building was designated as a Grade I building in 1950.

== Visitor attraction and museum ==
Converted into a living history museum, Nantclwyd y Dre today provides an insight into the history of the house, and lives of its residents. Changing fashions, interiors, and daily life can be experienced through faithfully recreated rooms which reflect the styles of historic periods from the medieval to modern eras, including:

- Modern: 1942 hall
- Edwardian: 1916 rector's study
- Victorian: 1891 schoolroom
- Georgian: panelled bedroom suite with Chinese-wallpaper
- Stuart: 1690 "cabinet" of Stuart owner Eubule Thelwall (c. 1622–1695), with its "Kidderminster stuff" hangings and plaster ceiling
- Jacobean: bedchamber with hung bed, painted cloths, and "stool of ease" in its closet
- Medieval: 15th-century "business room", its 1435 structure virtually unchanged, showing the preserved documentation of a medieval resident' pilgrimage to Rome, found during restoration within the building's infrastructure

In 2023, Nantclwyd y Dre benefited from an initiative funded by the National Lottery Heritage Fund and Welsh Government, to enhance its visitor experience through new soundscapes and costumes created by Theatr Clwyd. The project, which aimed to enrich the interpretive elements of the historic house, resulted in the installation of immersive soundscapes that represent the typical sounds of a busy household during the time periods encountered throughout the attraction. In addition, new costumes reflecting the varying period fashions of its occupants help bring the house's past to life.

== Lord's Garden ==
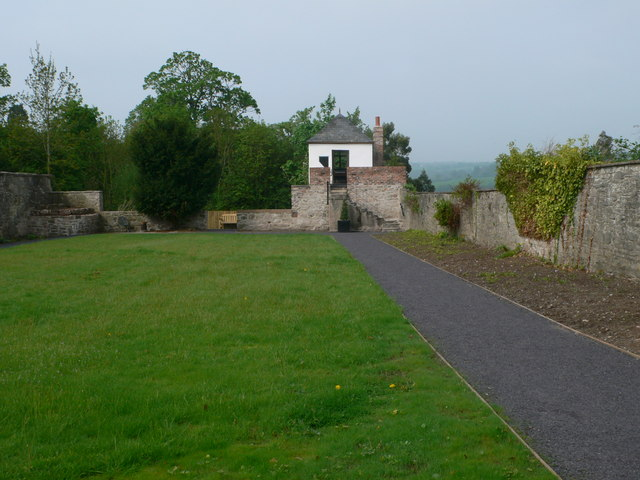
The inner 13th-century garden, showing the restored gazebo

Behind the house are two gardens, the inner garden and the outer Lord's Garden. The inner 13th-century garden occupies the area to the rear of the house, and is bounded by a substantial masonry wall.

The outer Lord's Garden is originally believed to have been part of a 13th-century developed castle garden. It became part of Nantclwyd y Dre after being rented by house owner Eubule Thelwall, who bought it in 1691. A 1780 plan shows both outer and inner paths, creating four roughly equal areas in the northern section, and what may have been an ornamental feature in the centre. In the south-west corner is a surviving substantial mound. Larger than depicted in the 1780 plans, 1980s archeological excavations suggest that the eastern section comprises spoil excavated during the construction of a swimming pool in the courtyard area. The older western section of the mound dates from before the 18th century, suggesting that it may have been either an artillery position associated with the Civil War siege of the town, or a later garden platform with views over the gardens, gazebo and onwards towards the castle.

A restoration of the Lord's Garden at Nantclwyd y Dre was completed in May 2016, funded by a Heritage Lottery Fund project in collaboration with Denbighshire County Council, Ruthin Town Council, and numerous volunteers. The project, which cost £220,000 and took three years, aimed to revive the historical significance and aesthetic of the garden, dating back to the 13th century.

Over a hundred volunteers, including students from Ysgol Tir Morfa, contributed to the garden's restoration and the project has been celebrated as a significant enhancement to the historical site, receiving the 2016 Quayle Award for its excellence in restoration.

A further project in 2022, funded by the Welsh Government's 'Green Communities' scheme saw improvements made to the perimeter of the kitchen garden with the installation of chestnut wood fencing to enhance the environmental quality and promote better ventilation for plant growth, and slate edging to protect the structural integrity of the area. Along with the works, new shrubs, planters, tools, benches, a garden shed, chalk boards and signage were purchased, to further promote the garden's development and visitors experience of the gardens.

Today, the garden features elements from three distinct periods; Medieval aspects including an enamelled mead with wildflowers; hedges, a nuttery, and vegetable beds representative of the 17th century; and 19th-century additions such as beech trees, a glasshouse, and herbaceous borders.

A team of both paid and volunteer gardeners continue to maintain the historic gardens which the public can purchase tickets to visit during the season. The gardens opened for National Garden Scheme on 30 June 2024, as part of the annual National Garden Scheme and both the house and gardens were awarded Hidden Gem status in 2023 and 2024.

== Lesser horseshoe bat colony ==
In 2022 Welsh Government funding saw the investment in bat camera technology and monitors, to track a significant maternity colony of lesser horseshoe bats that occupies the attic space of the house. The lesser horseshoe is a protected species, and one of the smallest bats in Britain. The roost uses the space as a breeding site, where females gather to give birth and rear their young. Visitors to Nantclwyd y Dre can track the progress of the roost and watch their movements live in reception via the live-streamed 'Bat Cam' and interactive display.

== Examples of content ==
=== The porch on stilts ===
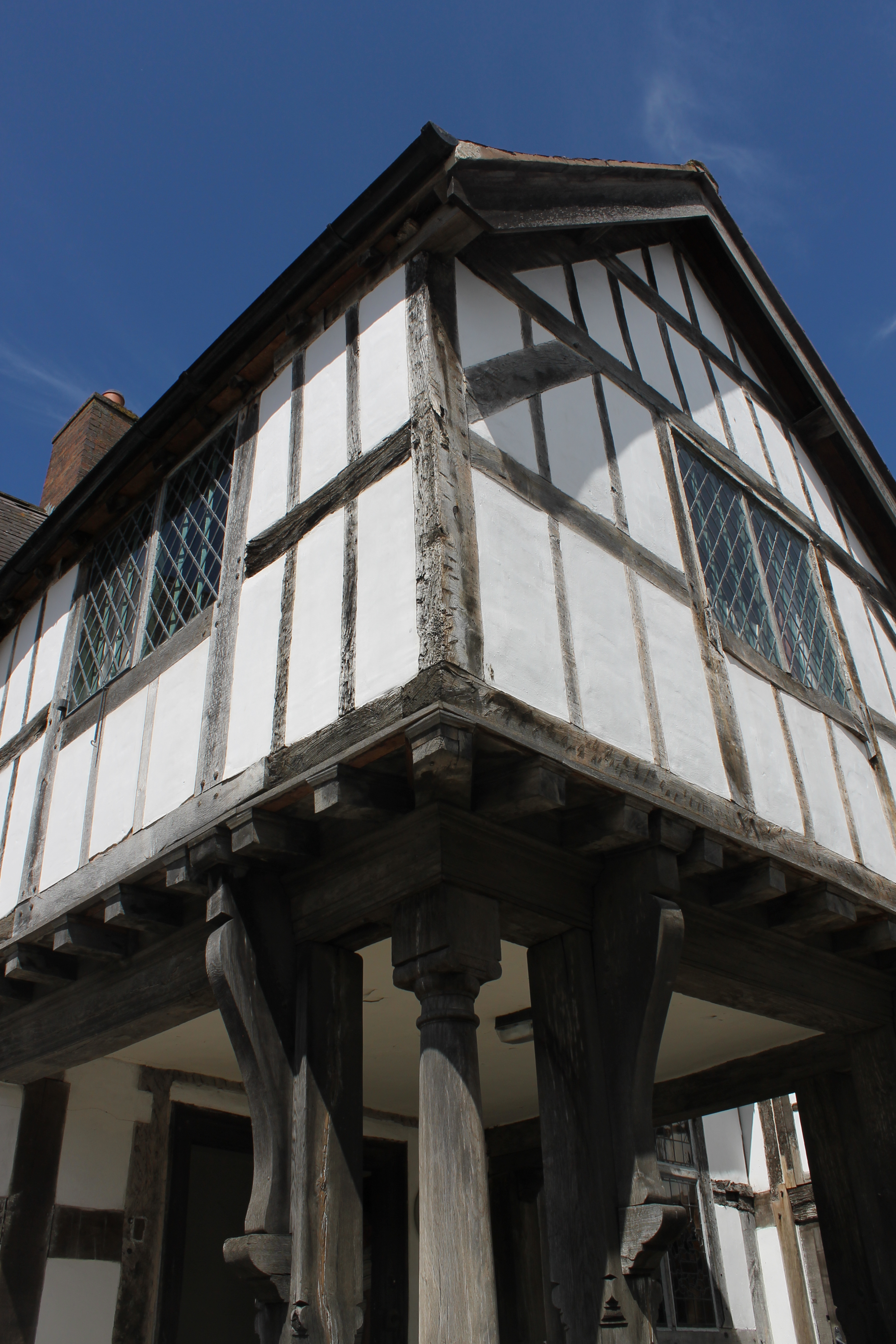

The distinctive porch on stilts with chamber above was added to the original mediaeval street frontage in about 1693 by Eubule Thelwall, as was shown by tree ring dating of four samples. There is a fine surviving monument to Thelwall in Llanelidan Church. At the same time he built Nantclwyd Hall; the land was acquired through his marriage to the Parry heiress.

=== Archaeological finds ===
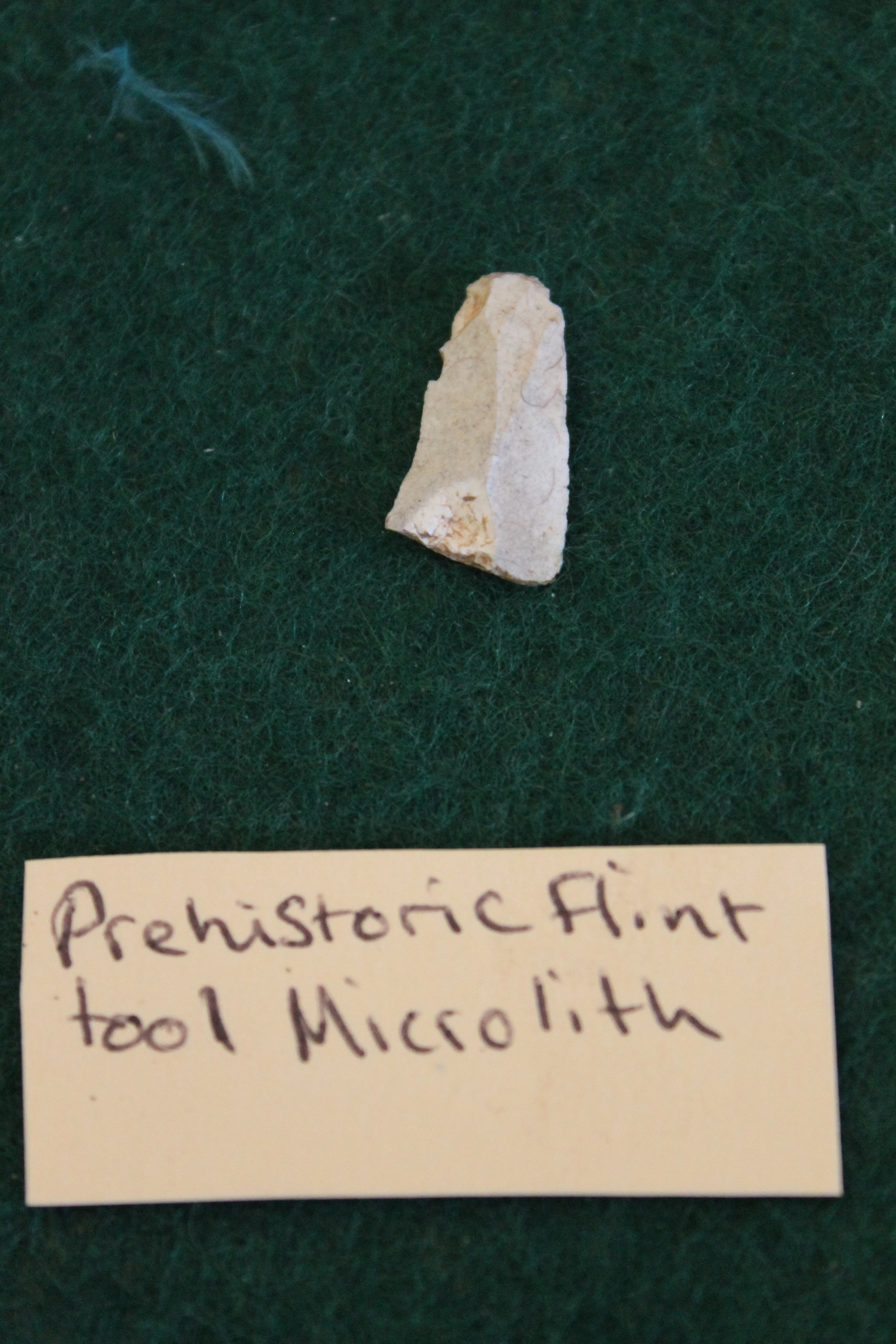

This cabinet contains finds of interest from the Lord's Garden. The Clwyd Powys Archaeological Trust had an exploratory excavation in the Lord's Garden in late winter 2013 and here is a sample of the type of items found.

=== Samuel Dyer Gough's Chair ===
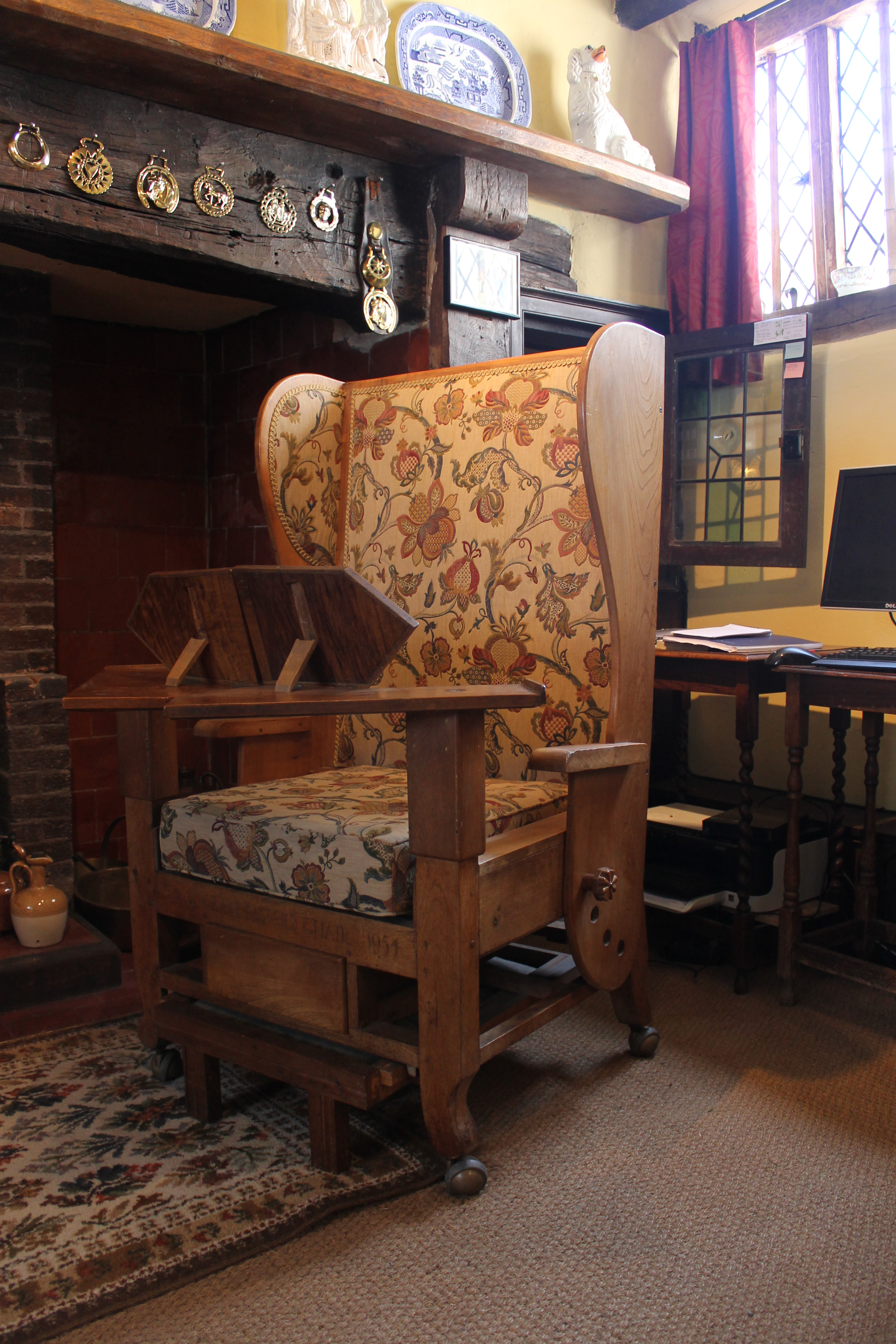

A handmade multifunctional recliner chair made by S. Dyer Gough, who lived at Nantclwyd y Dre between 1926 and 1984 with his wife Jean and family. He was an architect, craftsman, and historian.

=== Staffordshire figures ===
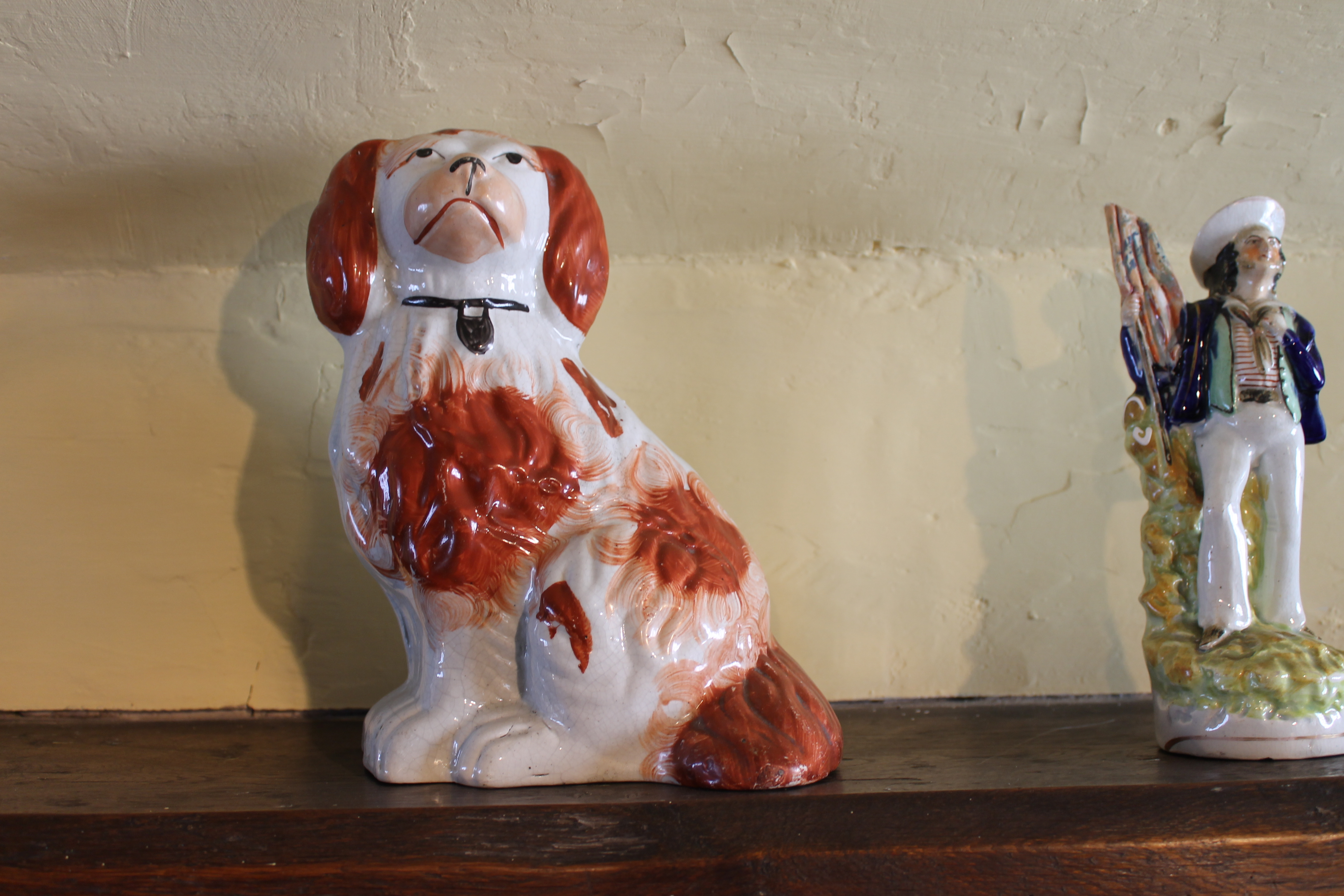

A collection of traditional Staffordshire figures and willow pattern china as found in the house during the Dyer Goughs period.

=== Bottle jacks ===
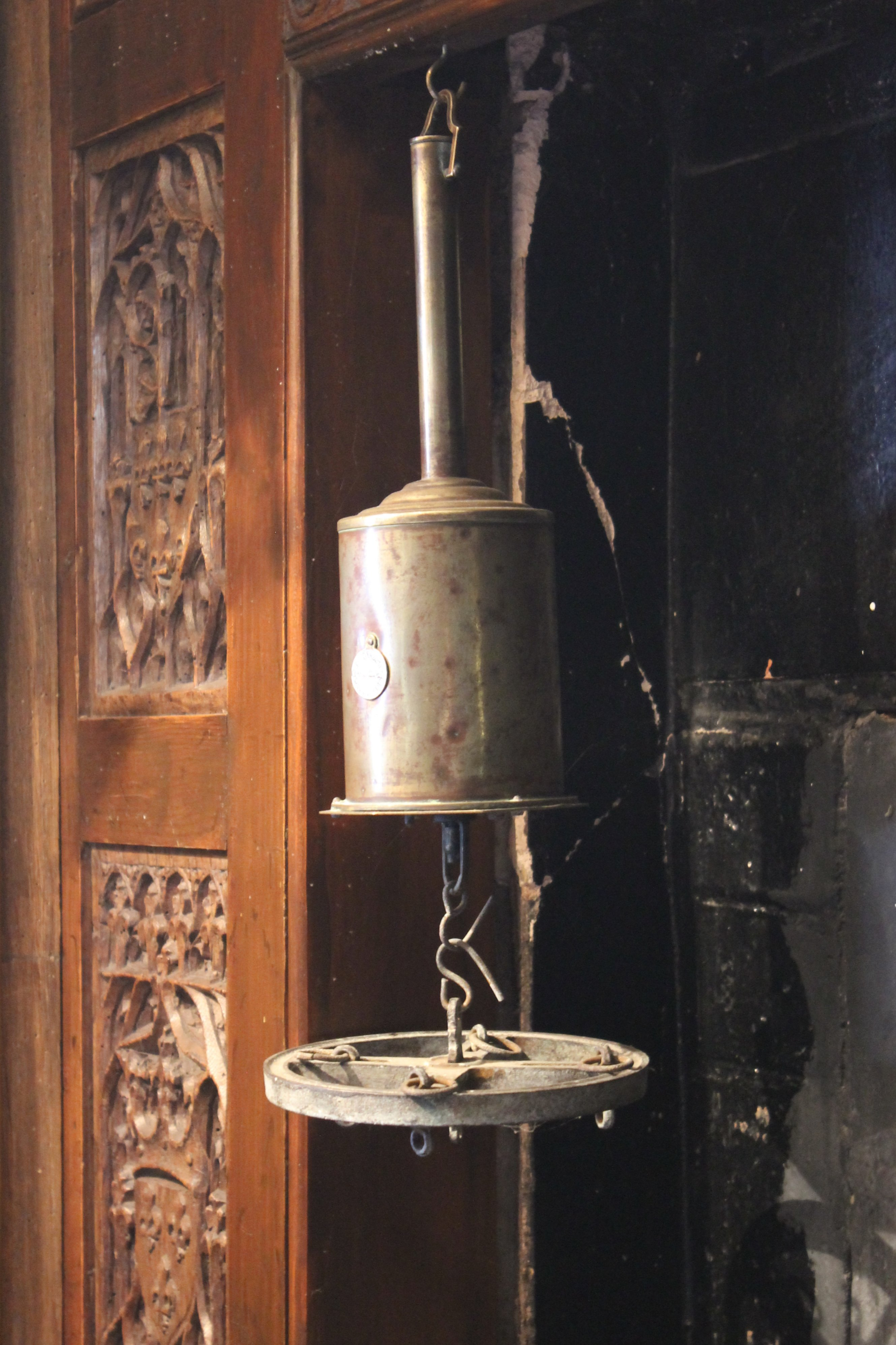

An important kitchen innovation of the time. A clockwork device that enabled meat to be turned and roasted in front of the fire.

=== Four carved panels flanking the fireplace ===
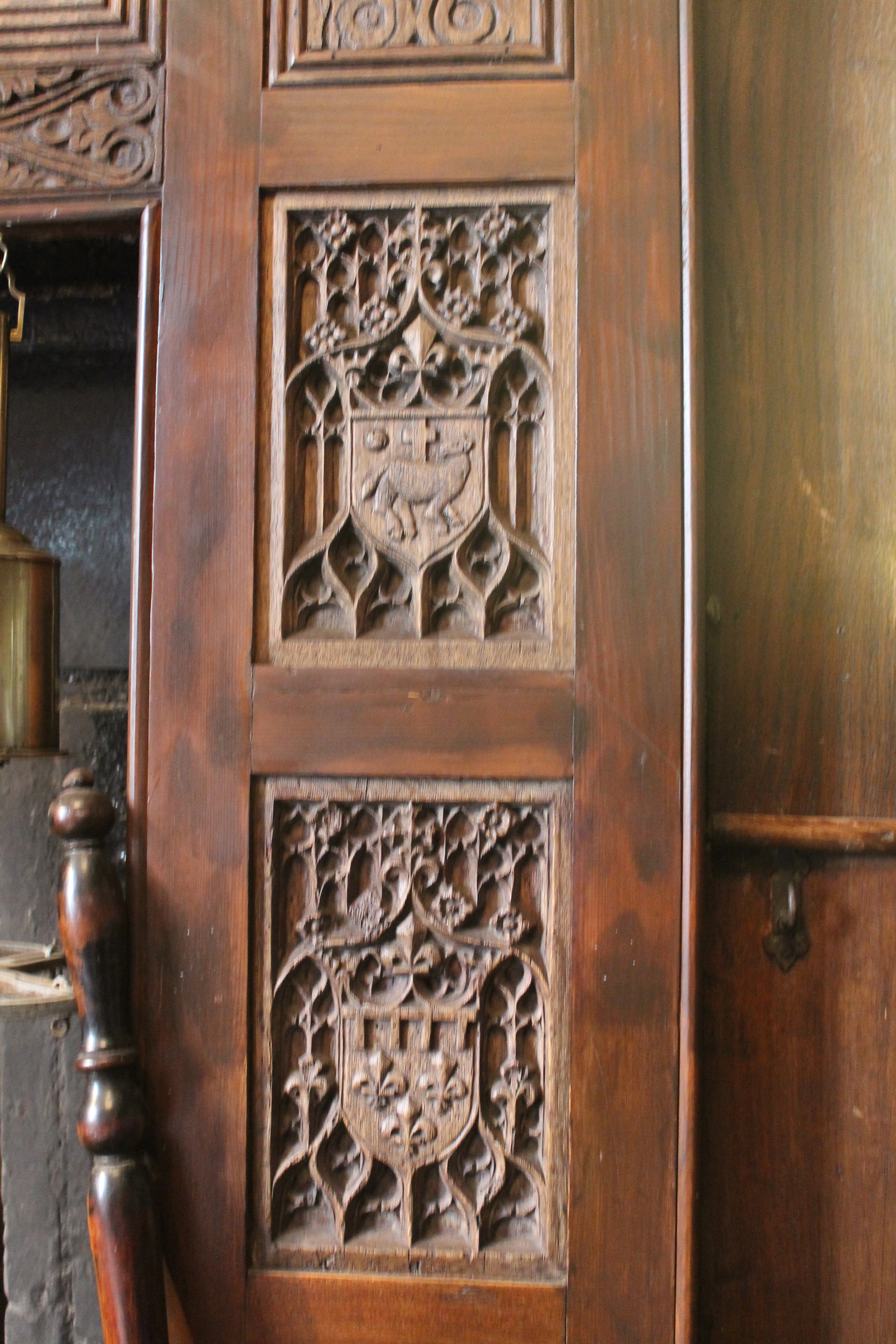

These four high-quality carved oak panels have been dated, and while the trees were felled soon after 1423, their carving style suggests a later date of 15–16th century. Despite the fleur de lys motifs on the shields in the panels, the timber is likely of Welsh origin (most probably from nearby Coed Marchan wood), and unlikely to be continental. The carvings most likely honoured Arthur (1486–1502), eldest son of Henry VII.

=== The Arms of Ednyfed Fychan ===
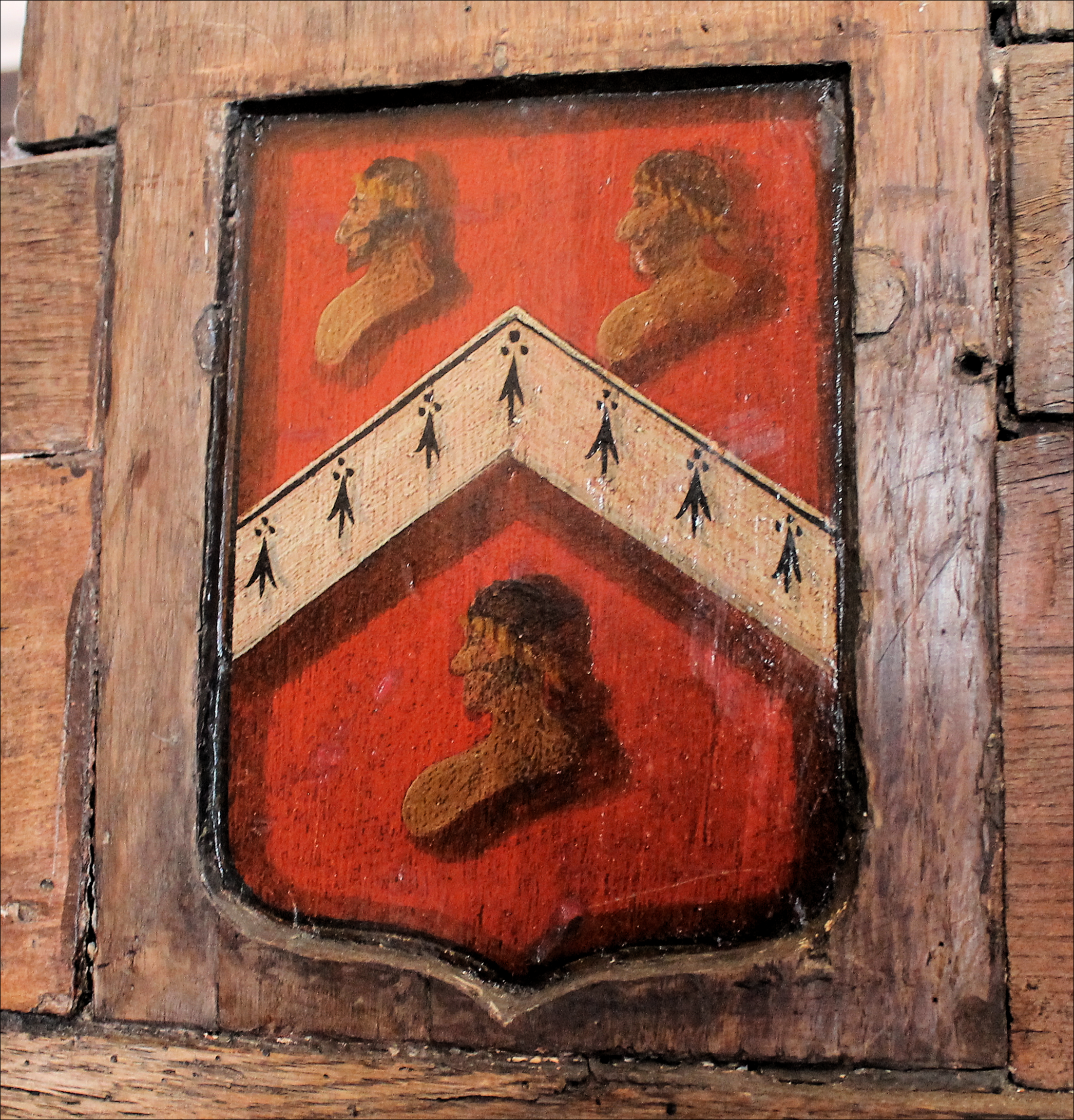

Attributed arms of Ednyfed Fychan (an ancestor of Owen Tudor), used and quartered by Wynne of Coed Coch and of Plas Uchaf. Description: "Gules a chevron ermine between three men's heads in profile erased proper." The ermine can also be seen on the national flag of Brittany. Ednyfed is said to have first come to notice in battle, fighting against the army of Ranulph de Blondeville, 4th Earl of Chester, who attacked Llywelyn at the behest of King John of England. Ednyfed cut off the heads of three English lords in battle and carried them, still bloody, to Llywelyn, who commanded him to change his family coat of arms to display three heads in memory of the feat.

=== Wattle and daub panel ===
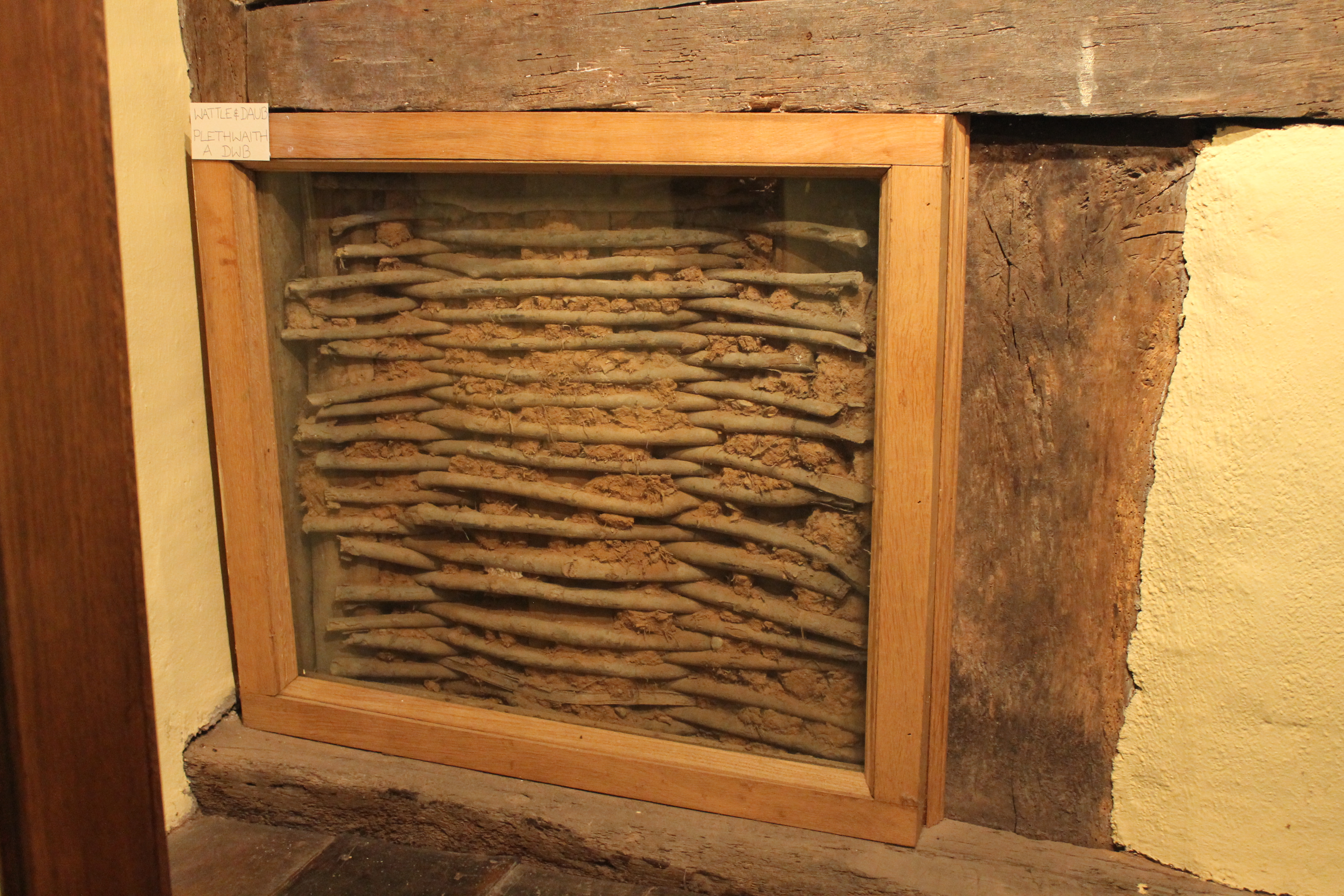

An example of the mediaeval horizontal hazel-wattle between the oak beams. They were 'sprung' into groves cut into the frame and interwoven round upright oak 'spars' also sprung into the frame. This exposed piece dates to c. 1435.

=== Ericsson 1905 magneto telephone ===
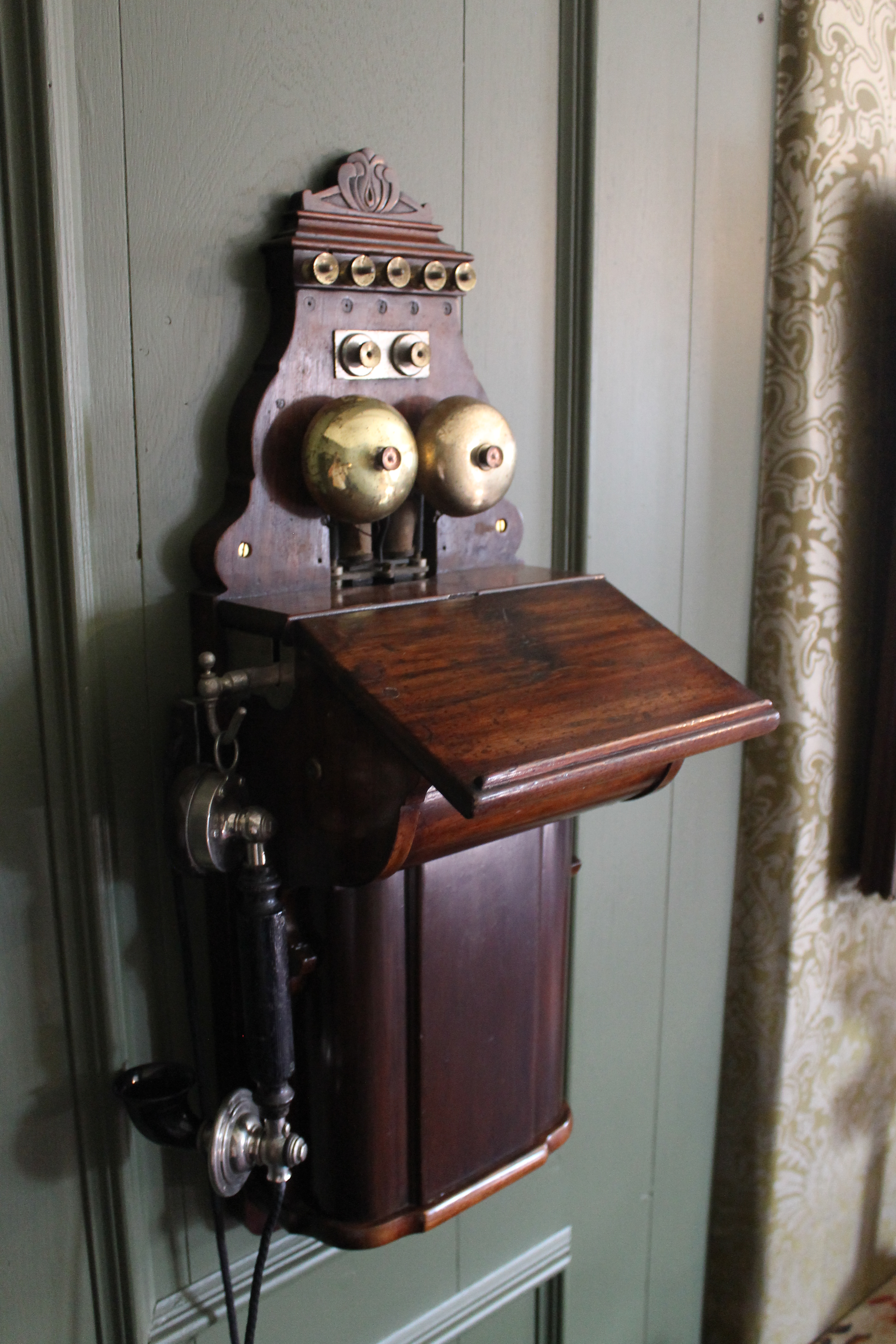

Nantclwyd House was the first house on Castle Street to have a telephone installed. The Rev. Thomas Pritchard lived here from 1907 to 1917 – he was the Rector of Llanfwrog Church. The wooden case held two batteries that worked the microphone. By turning the handle of the Magneto a bell would ring in the exchange and the person would tell the operator which number they wanted to be connected to. Electricity arrived at Nantclwyd at around 1914, provided by the Ruthin Electricity Supply Company.

=== A Victorian teacher's desk ===
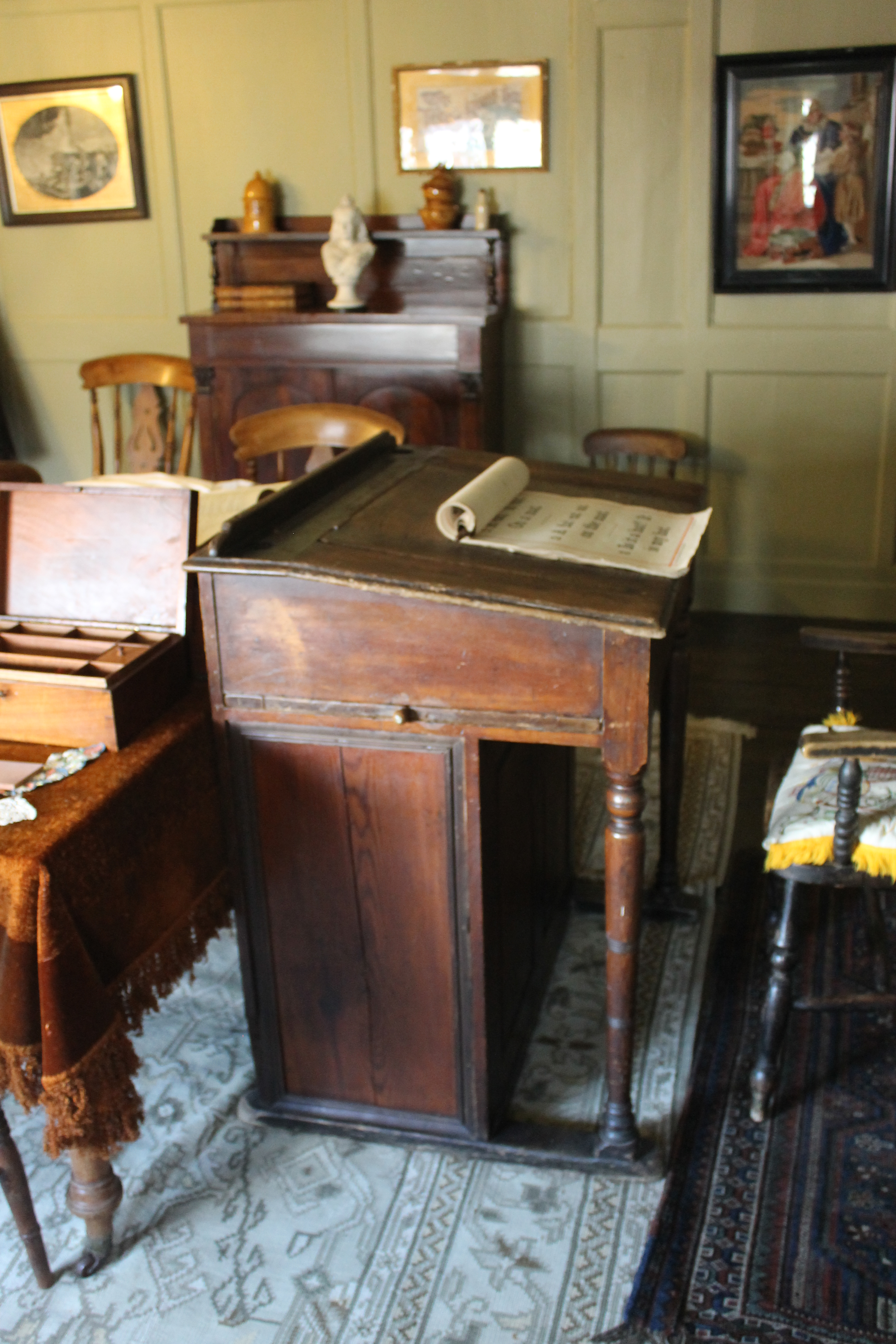

Between 1886 and 1893 Nantclwyd y Dre was run as Miss Charlotte Price's school for young ladies – daughters of the more prosperous tradespeople of Ruthin. The room is set as if they were to have a needlework lesson, showing typical needlework skills the girls would be learning, before they moved on to Ruthin County School at the age of 11 (now Ysgol Brynhyfryd).

=== Changing room in the Georgian Bedchamber ===
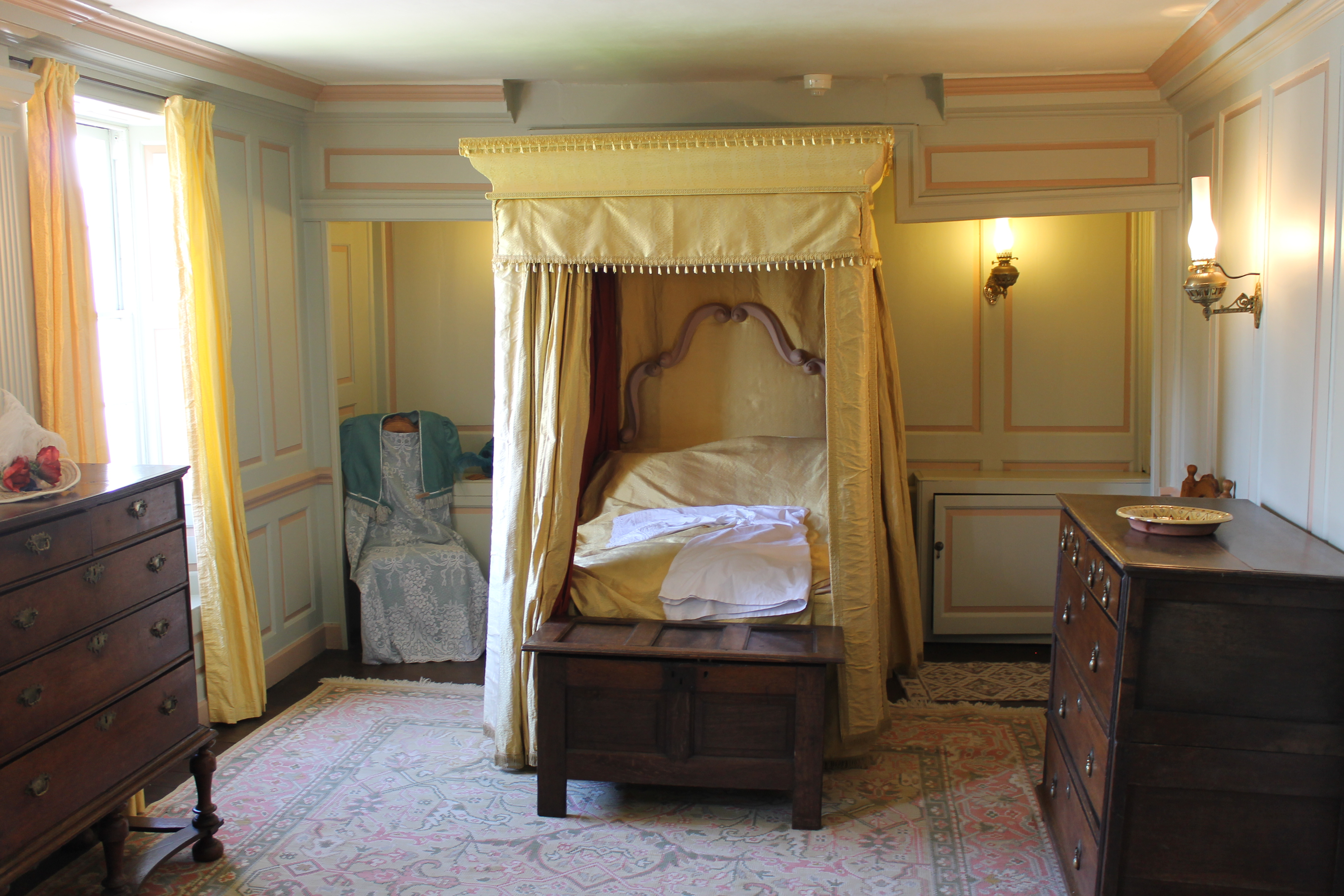

This room was used as a changing room alongside the grandest bedchamber which was created during the Georgian updating by the Wynne family around 1734. The wallpaper reflects the craze for Chinese influence patterns around this time and is a hand-blocked reproduction of an English wallpaper design c.1750-1760. The occupants would have used chamber pots, stored in pot-cupboards, as seen here.

=== Stool of ease or commode ===
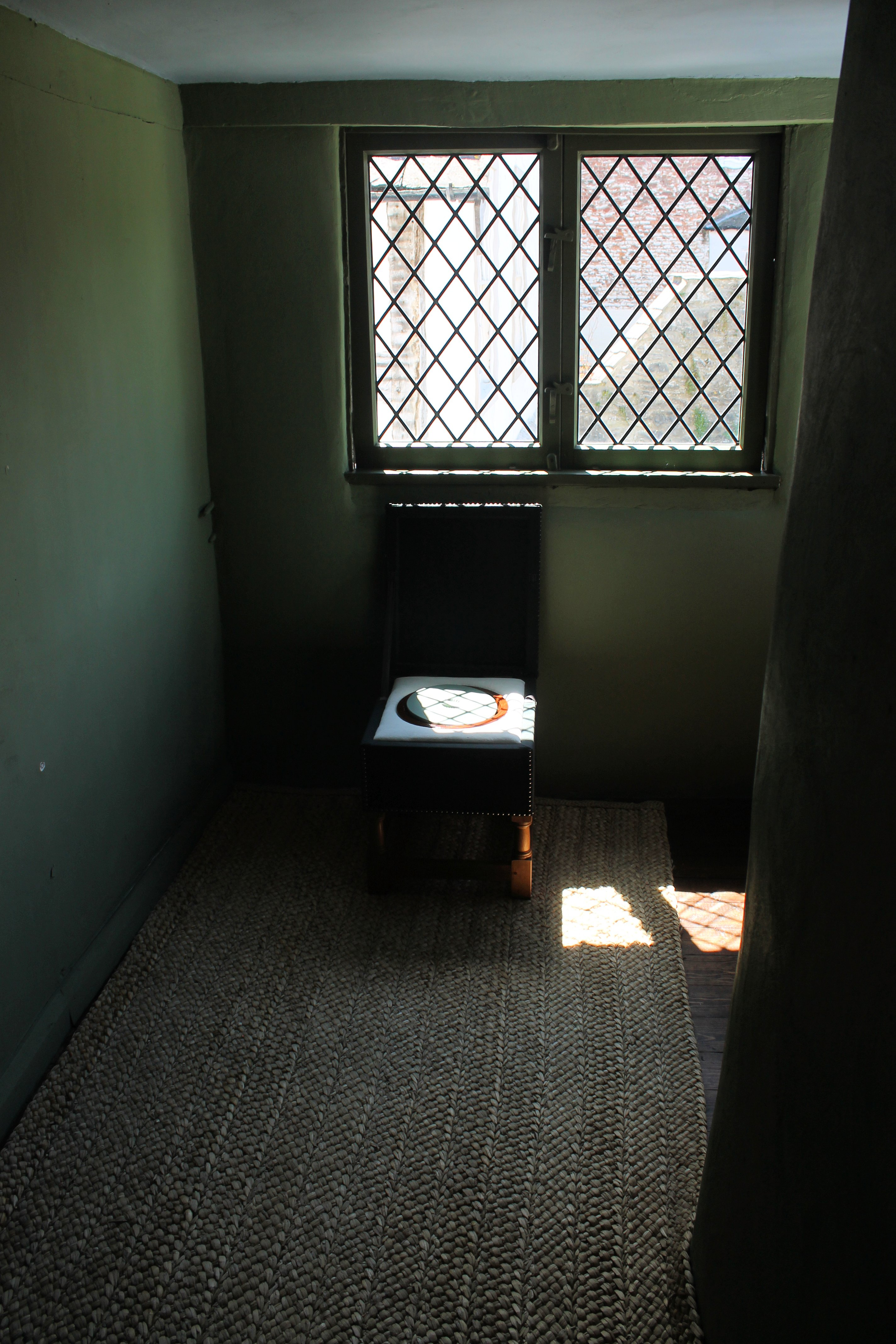

A 17th-century toilet consisting of a chamber pot set inside a lidded seat. It is found in the ensuite of the Jacobean bedchamber. This is a copy of a 17th-century original now displayed at Plas Mawr, Conwy. Such stools of ease - which are basically a lidded box containing a chamber pot - became popular in Elizabethan times as they were much more convenient than a trip to an outside privy.

=== Table in the Jacobean Room ===
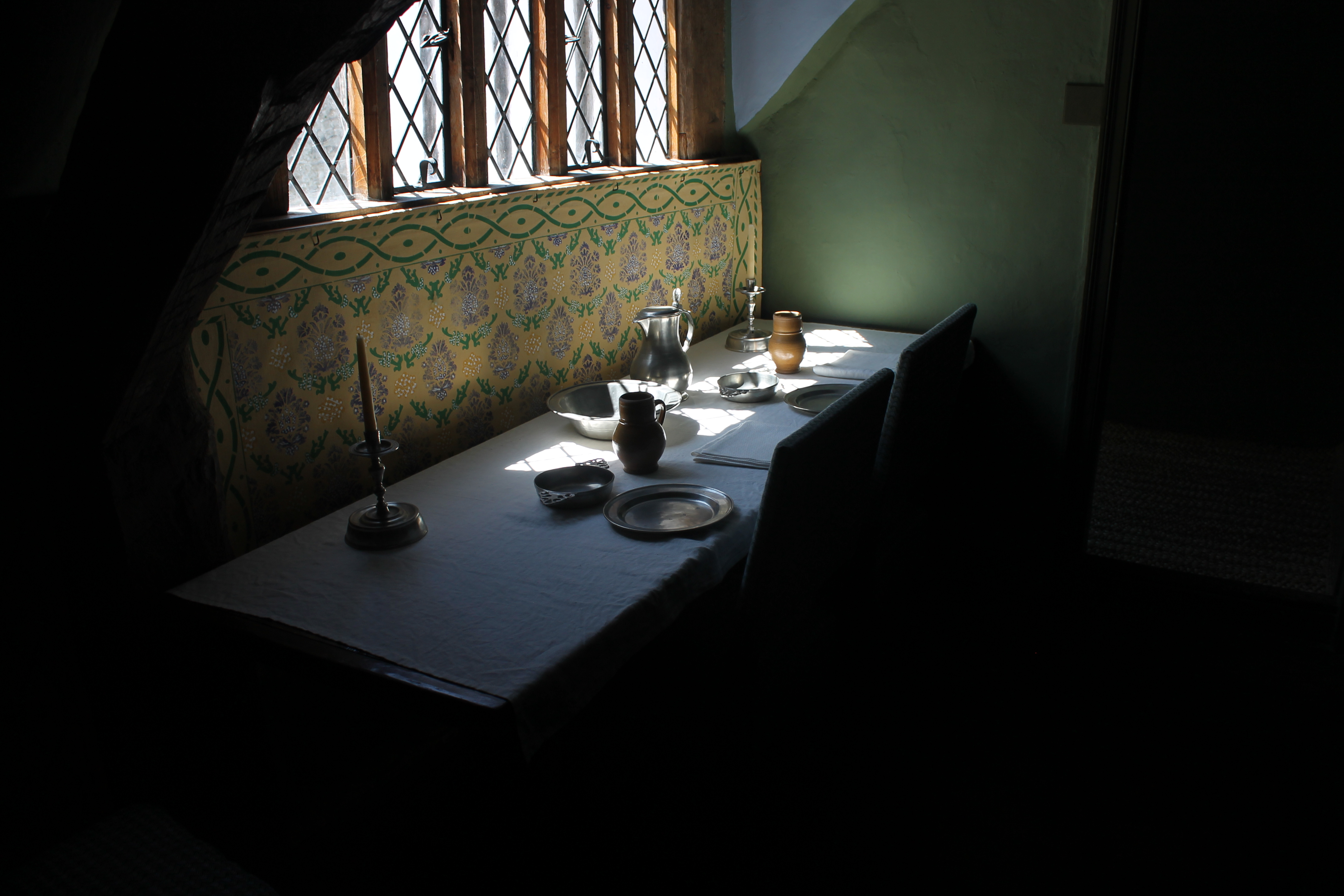

The table is set for dinner with its pewter tableware and napery, status symbols for the Parry family who added this room and the small ensuite next to it in about 1620. Tableware includes: pewter candlesticks, plates and porringers, a pewter ewer (or jug) and a basin for hand washing before and after meals, a pair of facon de Venise drinking glasses, Bellarmines salt glazed stoneware flagons and Rhineland imported drinking jugs.

=== Eubule Thelwall's Study ===
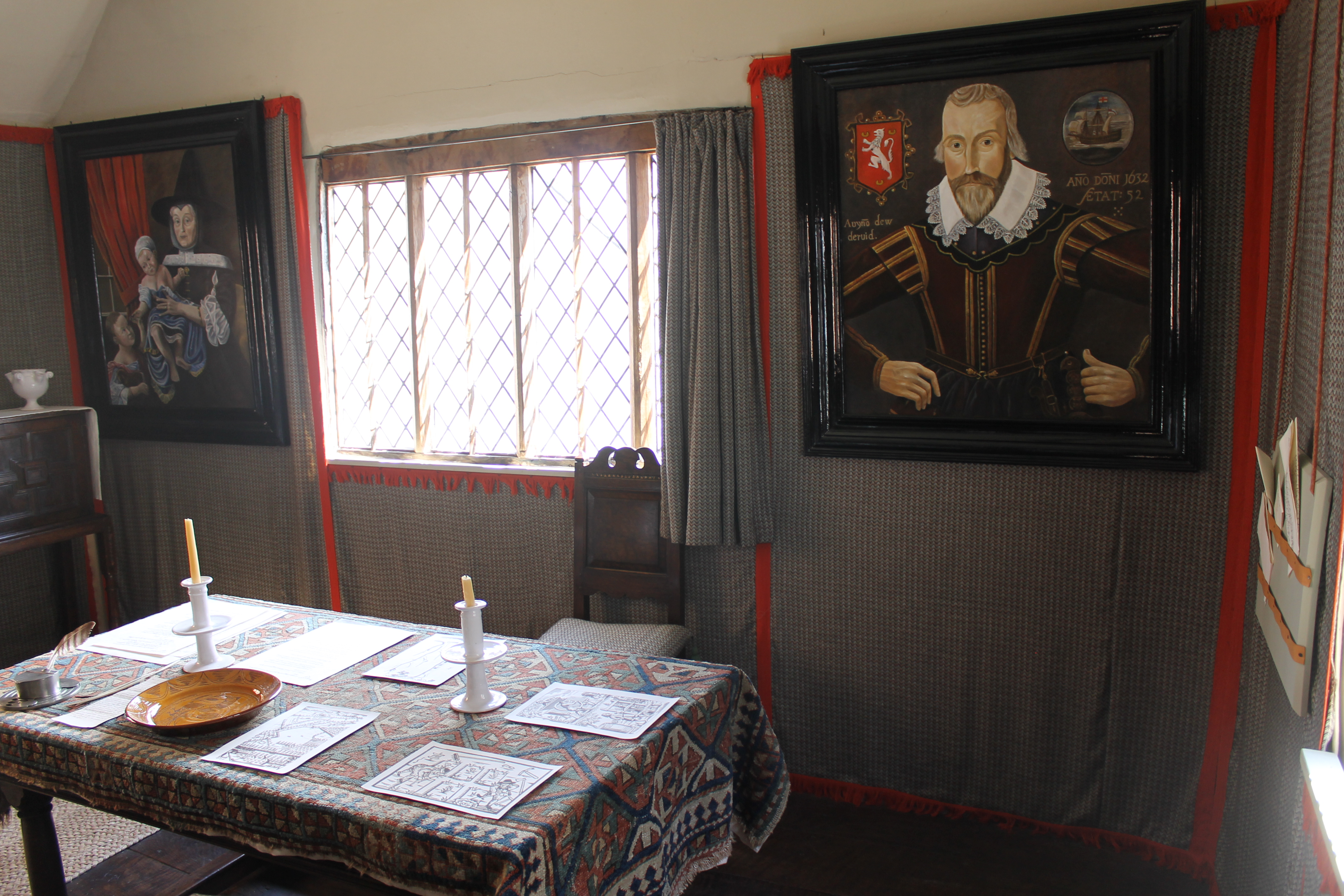

This ornate plaster work ceiling was installed when this room was added to Nantclwyd y Dre's original street frontage in c.1663 by Eubule Thelwall. The plasterwork motifs include mulberries and pears. This type of plasterwork was very popular in 1660-70s. Eubule Thelwall was a keen gardener. To the right of the doorway is the remains of what was at one time the outside wall of the old house.

=== Medieval chamber ===
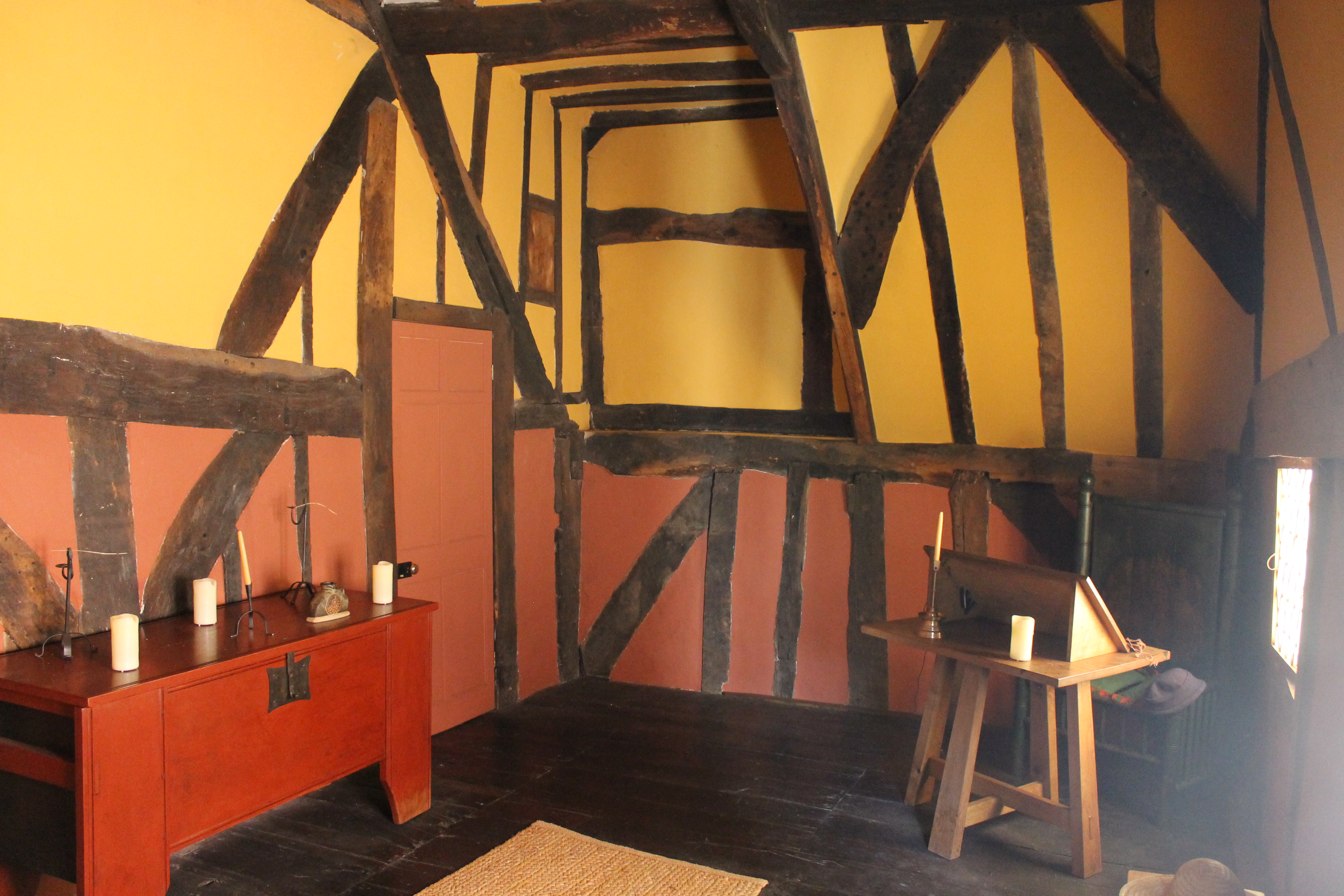

This room is part of the original medieval hallhouse. It includes simple hardwearing furniture with a typical scribe's desk. Typical medieval waxed canvas window coverings called fenestrals were used to keep out as much of the weather as they could. The rushlights didn't give out much light.

=== The gazebo ===
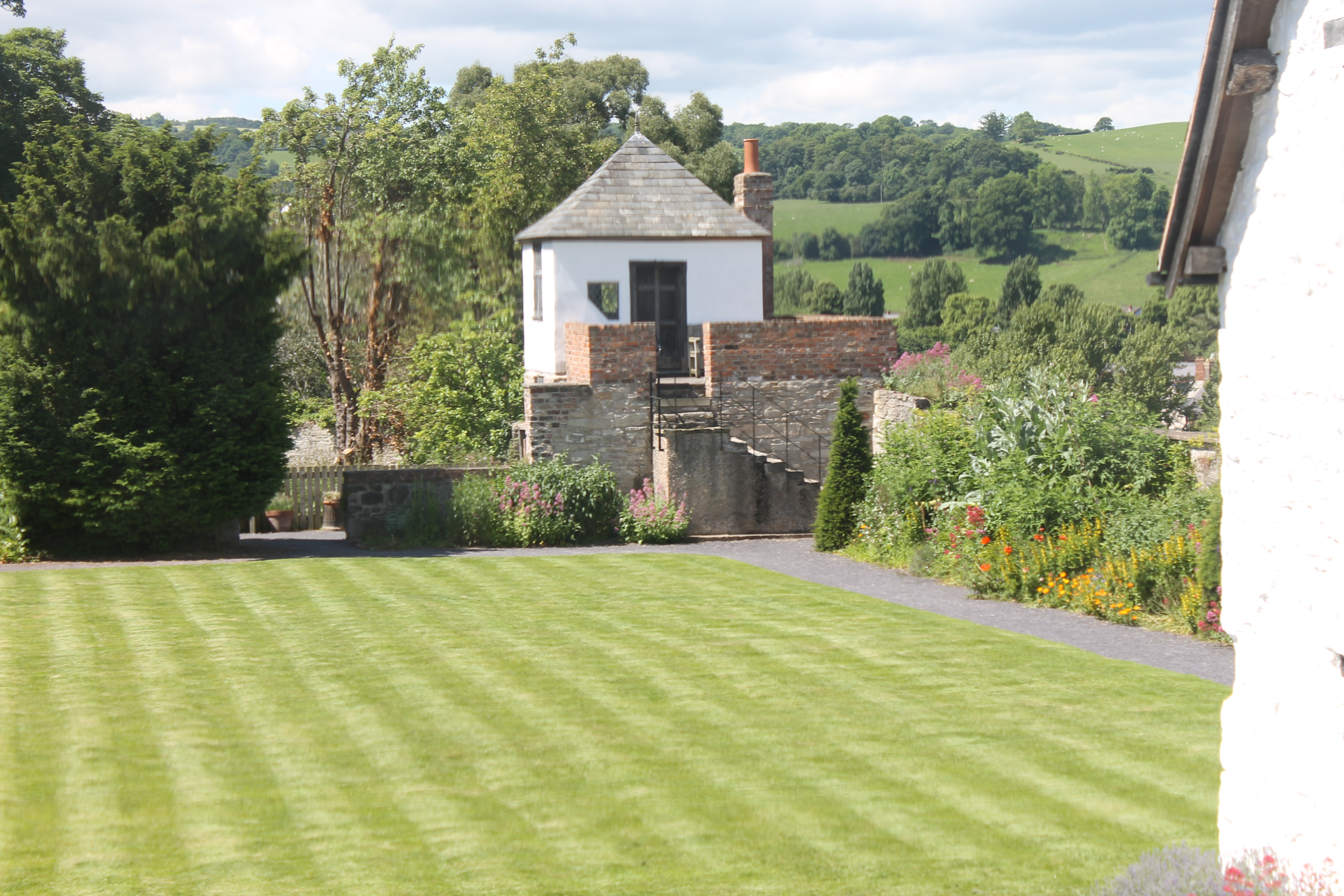

The Grade II listed building at the end of the walled garden of Nantclwyd y Dre dates to the early 18th century and only appears on prints after 1715. The upper floor of the building was used as a study room by the three daughters of the Dyer-Gough family when they were growing up here in the 1940s. It still offers beautiful views out over the Vale of Clwyd on a clear day. The ground floor room is now made out as a potting shed complete with gardening books and early 20th-century tools.

=== Ostrich plumes ===
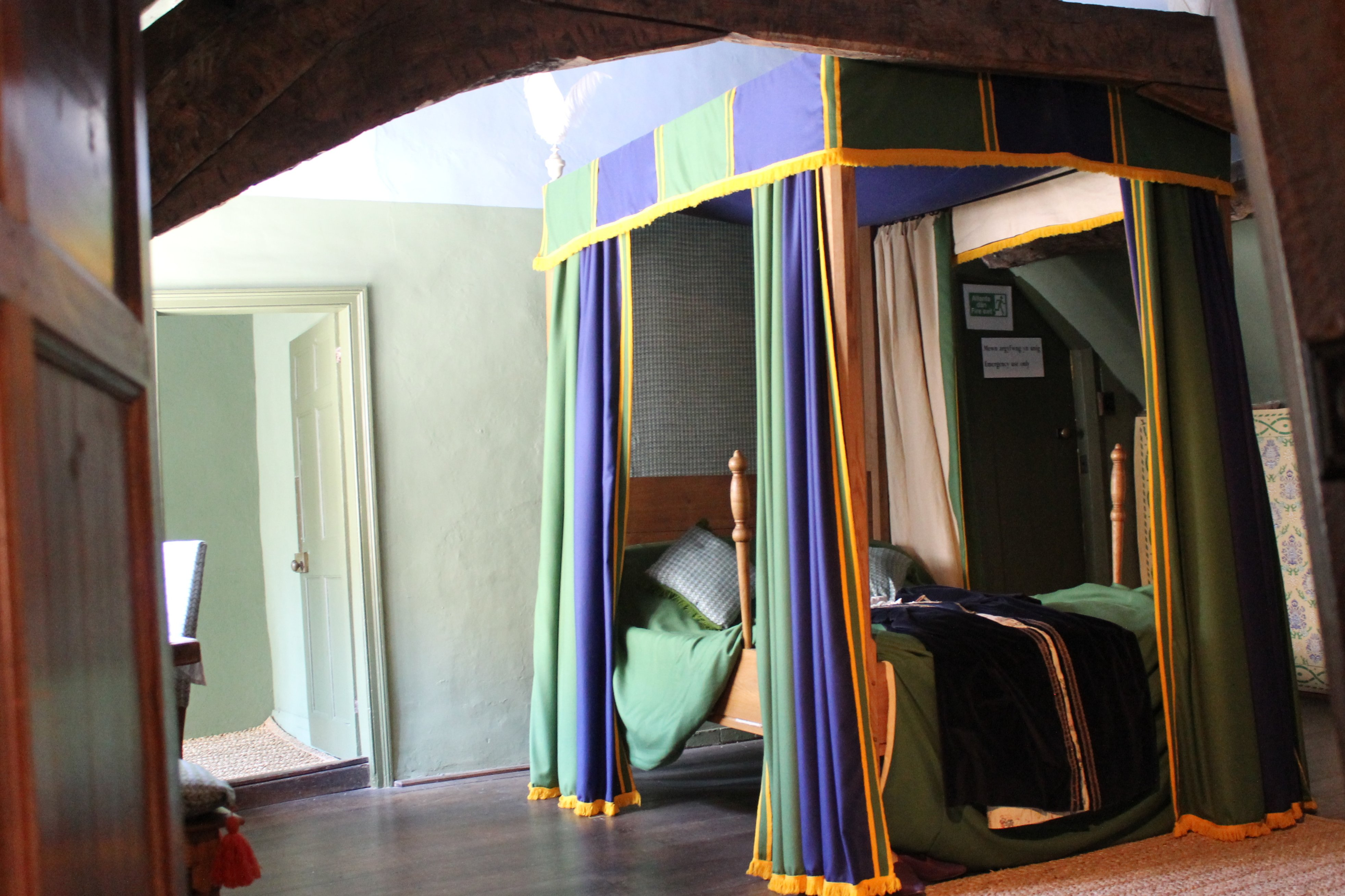

White ostrich plumes top each corner of the four poster bed (called 'French bed' at that time) in the Jacobean chamber. These would have been the height of fashion in the early 17th century and would have adorned the bed to show the high status of its wealthy owner, Simon Parry. This 'corded' bed has three mattresses, a sign of high status as well as comfort. The bed is equipped with 'bedstaffs', which prevented piled bedclothes from falling off the bed.

=== The Hall Gallery ===
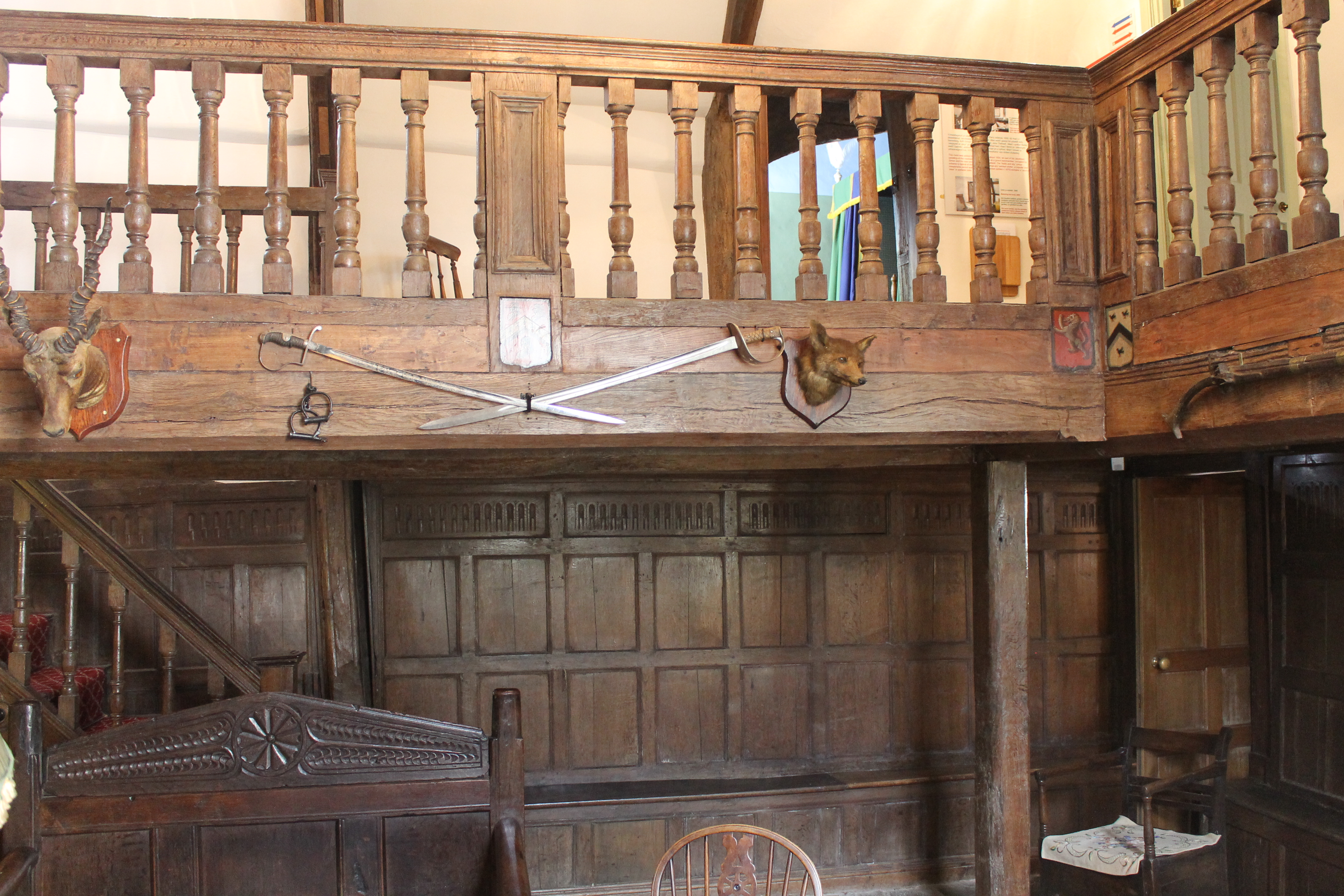

One of the most striking features of the house is the gallery which runs along two sides of the hall. The wood of the gallery has been dated to around the late 17th century and it is thought that the heraldic panels set into it, were added at a later date, most likely by the Wynne family. The main balustrades indicate a date of c. 1680–90, but the stairs balustrades could be somewhat later, possibly c. 1730. Mrs Jean Dyer Gogh informed RCAHM that the gallery had been taken from St Saeran at Llanynys which was re-ordered c. 1768 and a second theory is that it was taken from Llanelidan Church, but to date there is no evidence of either. A 2002 report by Richard Morriss, however, suggests that the gallery was made for nantclwyd y Dre, rather than imported which dates the gallery to Eubule Thelwall's alterations c. 1662–95. The heraldic panels he dates at late 18th century.

=== Georgian dressing table ===
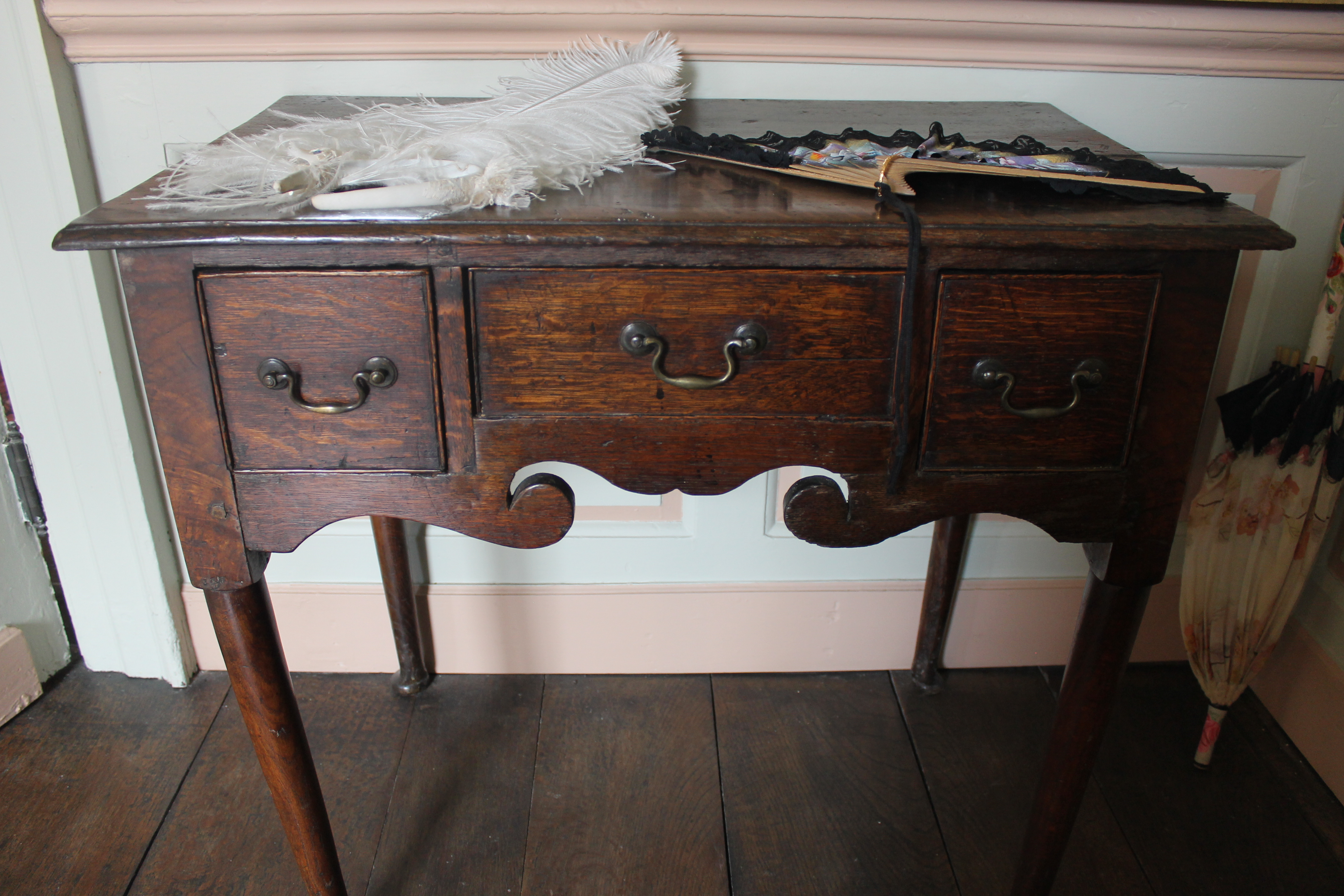

This is an original piece of Georgian furniture (c. 1720) and would have been an essential item in any Georgian lady's bedchamber. The name at the time would have been 'a chest on a stand'. This room was created in 1773 and the panelling is original to the house.

=== Attic doorway ===
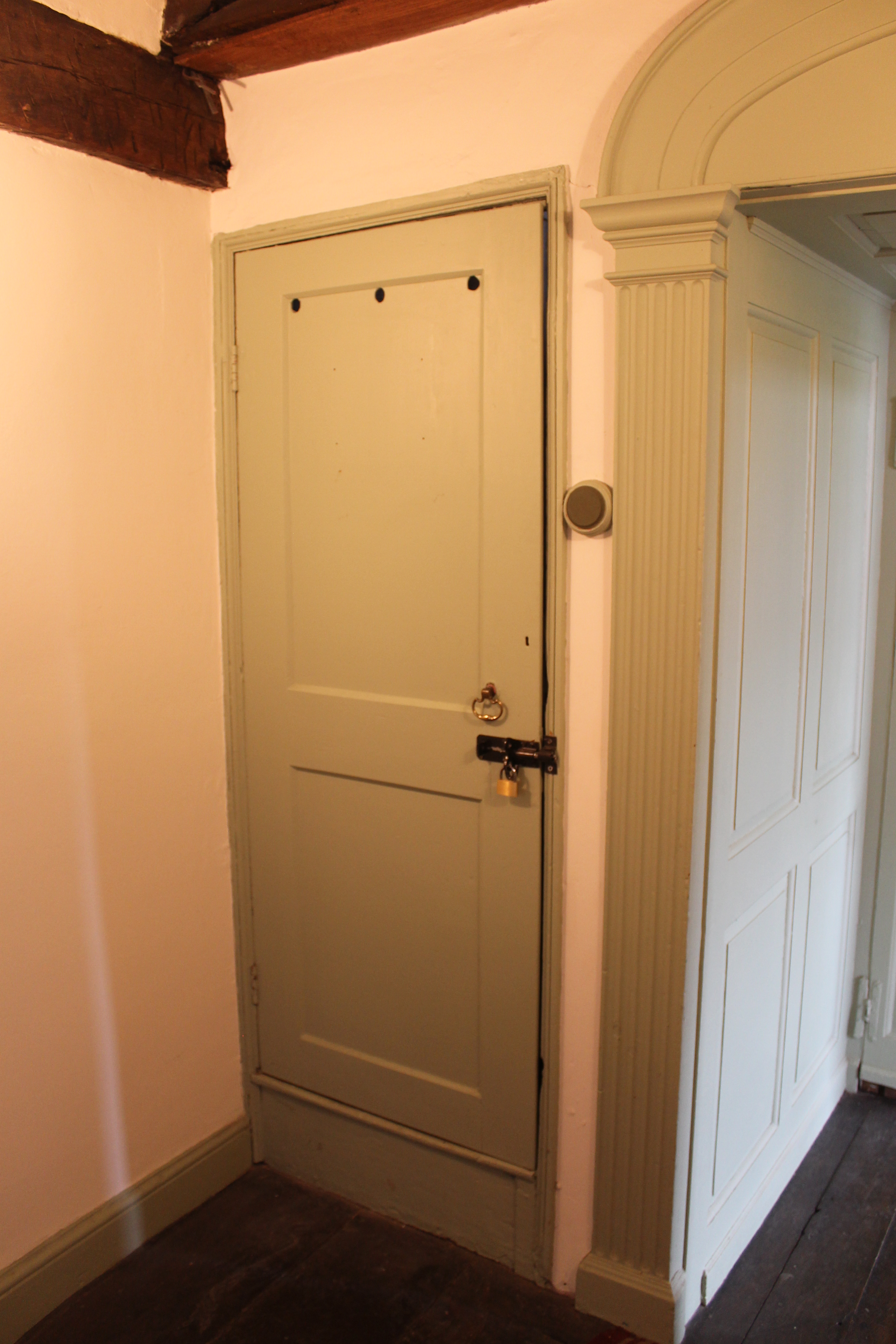

This doorway leads to the attics which were the servants' quarters during the Georgian period. However, the door is now kept locked and the attics undisturbed because it is now a bat roost. There are 3 species of bats living in the attics at Nantclwyd y Dre – pipistrelle, long eared and lesser horseshoe bats. The lesser horseshoes are the rarest and their colony size is estimated at 60 individuals.

=== Inscription behind parlour panelling ===
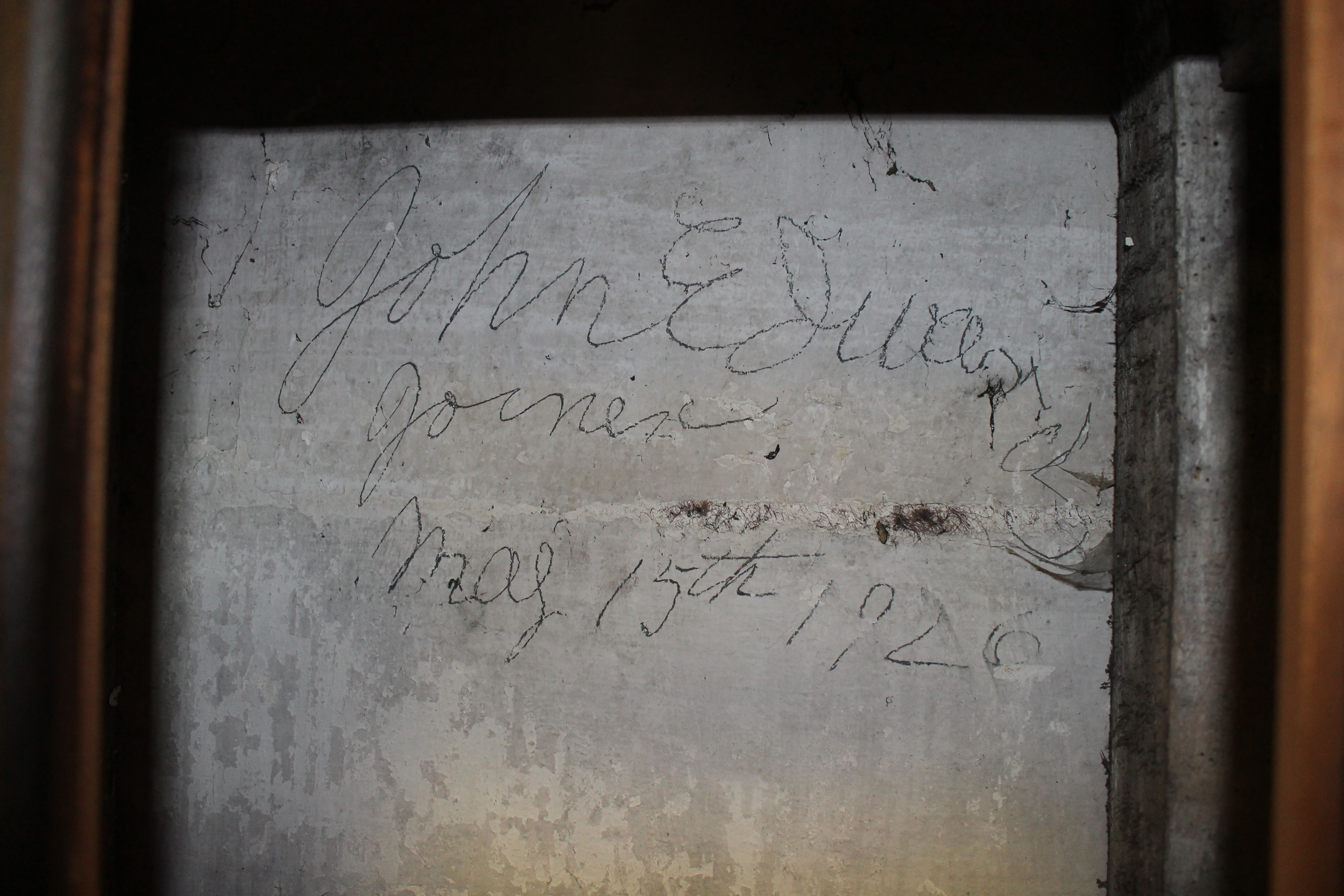

During the house restoration, an inscription was uncovered behind the wooden pearwood panelling in the parlour. Written in pencil it reads "John Edwards joiner Holywell 15th of May 1926". This implies that the old panelling was introduced to the house as late as 1926.

=== Inkwell ===
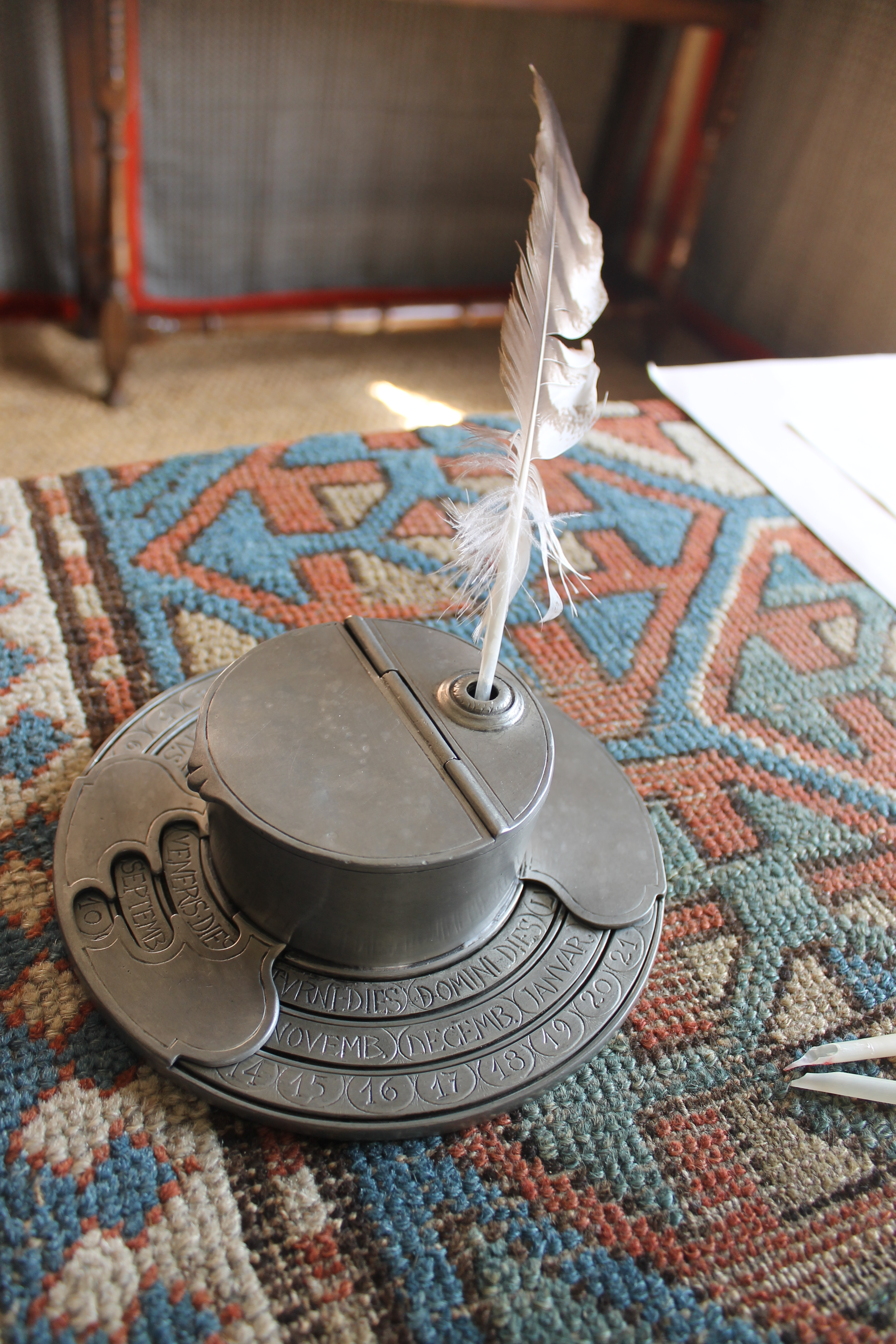

Pewter handmade inkwell that also serves as a calendar as it has rotating rings around the base to adjust the day, date and month. Possibly Italian.

== Gallery ==
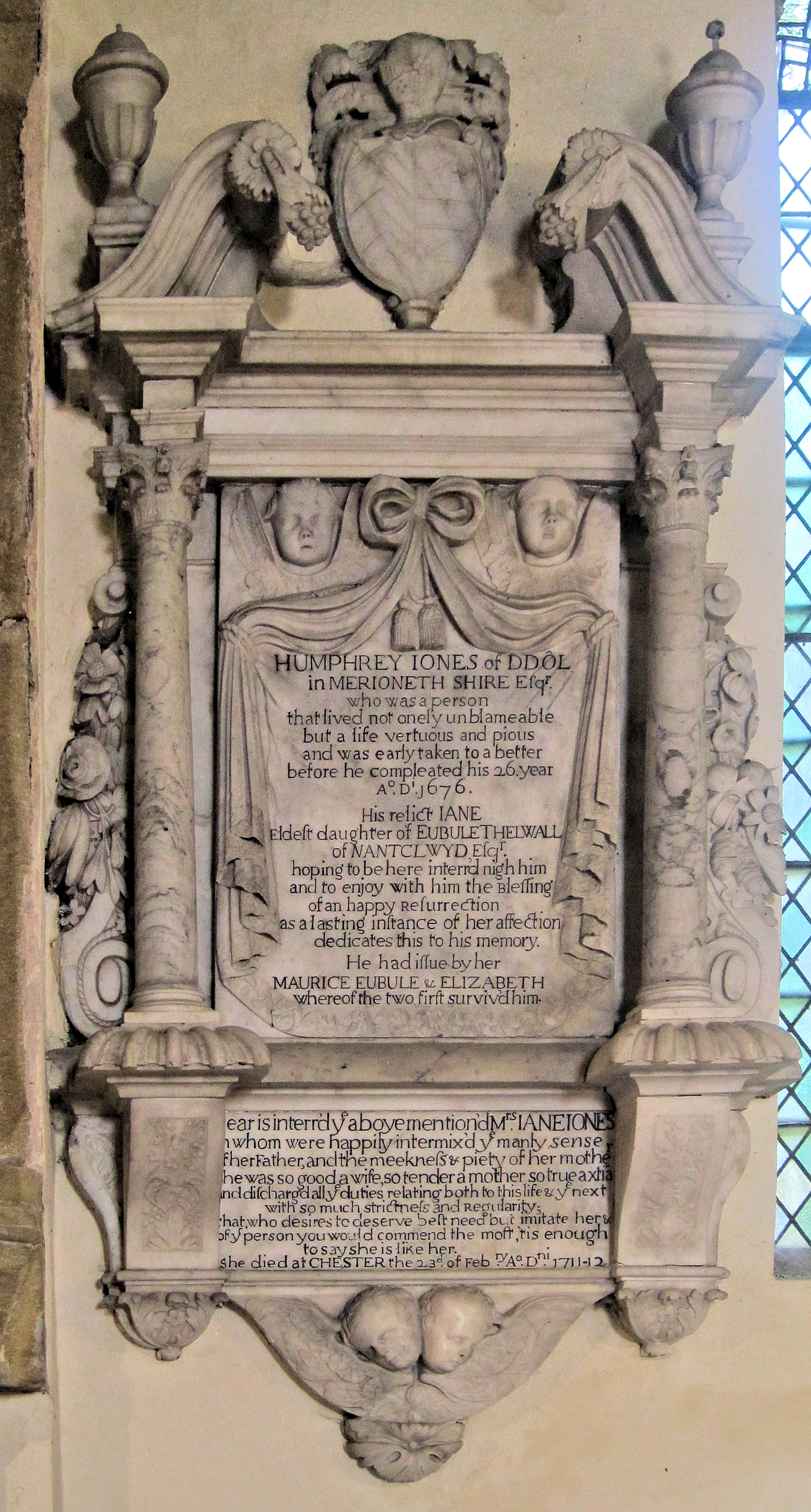
A memorial to Jane, Eubule Thelwall's daughter at Llanelidan church.

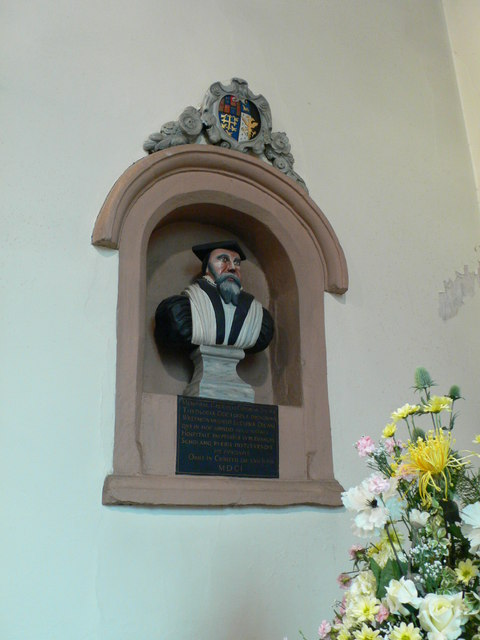
A memorial to Gabriel Goodman, born at Nantclwyd in 1528.
