= Gabriel Goodman =

Welsh priest and Dean of Westminster

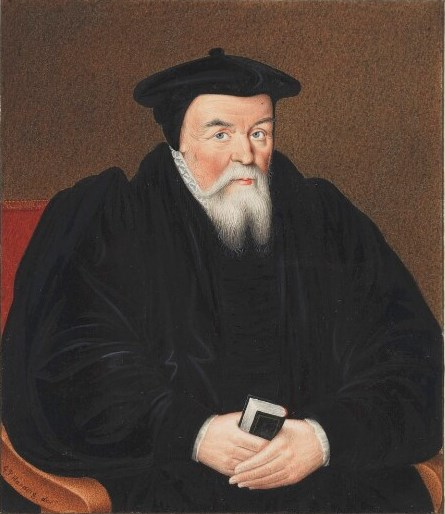
- Title: Dean of Westminster

Personal life
- Born: 6 November 1528 Ruthin
- Died: 17 June 1601 (aged 72)

Religious life
- Religion: Church of England

Senior posting
- Based in: England
- Period in office: 1561–1601

Gabriel Goodman (6 November 1528 – 17 June 1601) became the dean of Westminster on 23 September 1561 and the re-founder of Ruthin School, in Ruthin, Denbighshire. In 1568 he translated the First Epistle to the Corinthians for the Bishops' Bible and assisted Dr. William Morgan with his translation of the Bible into Welsh. He is mentioned on the monument to William Morgan which stands in the grounds of St Asaph cathedral.

== Early years ==
Gabriel Goodman, the second son of Edward Goodman, a wealthy merchant in Ruthin, Denbighshire, was born at Nantclwyd y Dre, Ruthin in 1528. Very little is known of his early years, but a nineteenth-century biography suggests that he was taught at home by one of the priests of the dissolved collegiate church at Ruthin. Goodman matriculated from Jesus College, Cambridge, in 1546. He graduated BA in 1549 or 1550, and M.A. from Christ's College in 1553 where he had become a fellow the prior year. He returned to Jesus College as a fellow in 1554. He proceeded under special dispensation to a D.D. from St John's College in 1564. He became chaplain to Sir William Cecil, later Lord Burghley, and tutor to William's eldest son Thomas Cecil, Earl of Exeter.

== Ecclesiastical career ==
In 1559 Goodman was made a prebendary of St Paul's Cathedral to which he added a prebend of Westminster Collegiate Church in May 1560. The old Westminster Abbey had been dissolved and the monks dispersed or pensioned. Queen Elizabeth I reinstituted the establishment as a collegiate church with Dr Bill as Dean and Gabriel Goodman as twelfth prebendary.

Sometime in 1561 Goodman was promoted to the position of Dean and in January 1562 he was concerned in "a memorable convocation of the clergy of the Province of Canterbury wherein the matters of Church were to be debated and settled for the future regular service of God and establishment of orthodox Doctrine". The convocation's deliberation culminated in the Thirty-Nine Articles of which Goodman was a signatory.

When William Morgan was supervising the printing of the Welsh Bible he stayed with Goodman at the Deanery. Dean Goodman was well versed in several languages and was considered for seven bishoprics but, for reasons which are not clear, Goodman's attempts to secure a diocese were unsuccessful. Notwithstanding the support of Matthew Parker, Archbishop of Canterbury, Goodman failed to gain the see of Norwich in 1575, Rochester in 1581, Chichester in 1585 and Chester in 1596.

== Re-foundation of Ruthin School ==
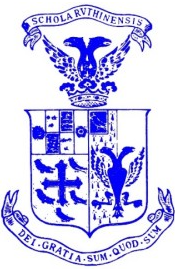
Arms of Gabriel Goodman, adopted by Ruthin School

In 1574 Goodman returned to his home-town of Ruthin where he made strenuous efforts on its behalf. In addition to signing a petition to the Countess of Warwick to arrange a new charter for the borough, Goodman had built a new School-house to the north of St Peter's Church. Whilst there is evidence to suggest that Ruthin School had continued to function after the dissolution of the collegiate church in or about 1535, it is not clear where the school was held. It therefore appears that Goodman had the new building constructed to provide a permanent home for his old school.

Over the next decades Goodman endeavoured to secure Ruthin School's future. On 23 February 1591 Goodman presented the lands and incomes of the churches of Ruthin and Llanrhydd, in perpetuity, to the President (the Bishop of Bangor) and the Warden of Ruthin and in May 1599 he returned home "to perfect that work begun of the school".

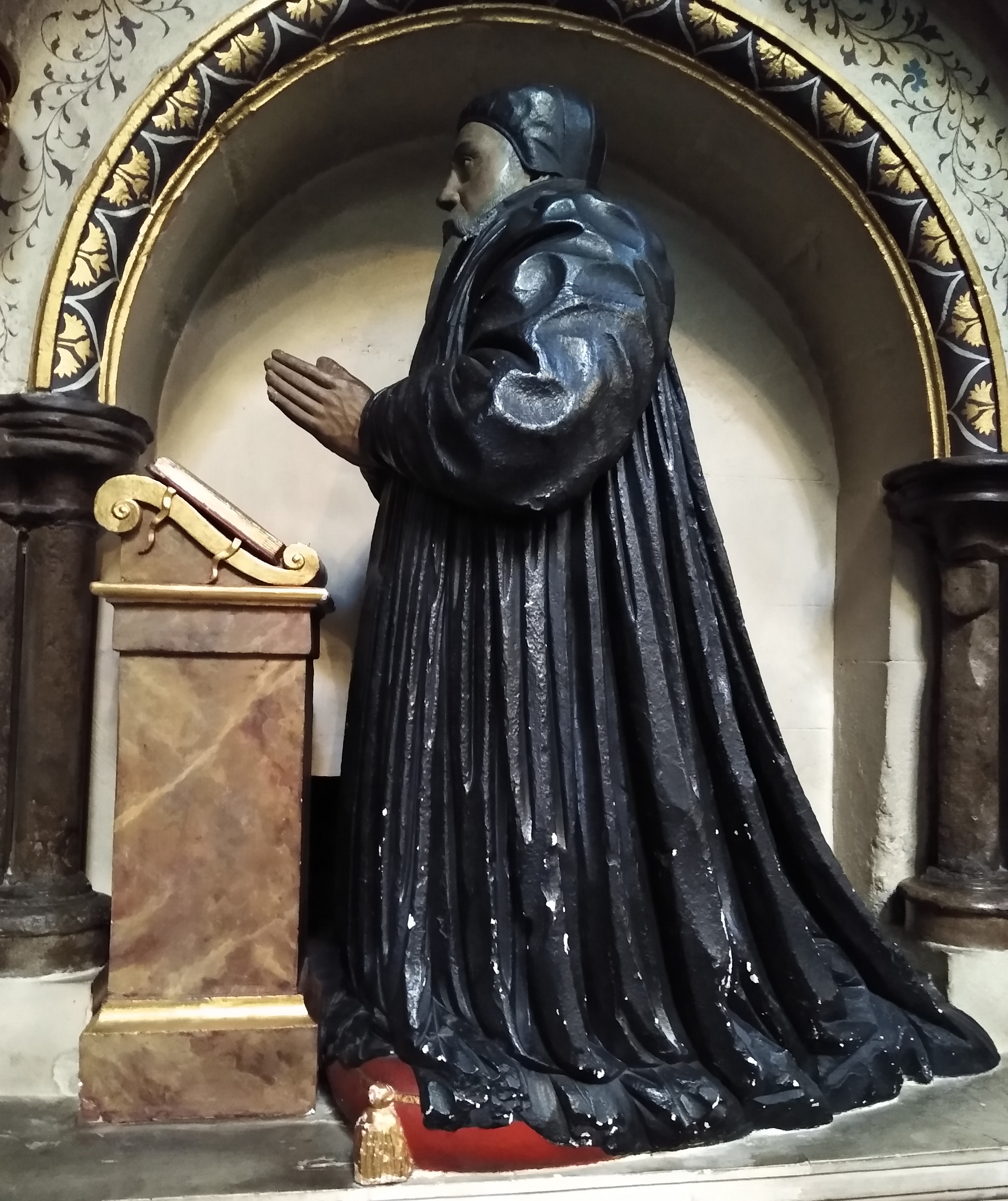
Statue of Gabriel Goodman in Westminster Abbey

Gabriel Goodman died on 17 June 1601 and was buried in Westminster Abbey. A memorial monument was also installed in the Ambulatory Chapel of St Benedict with a Latin inscription translating as:

To God the best and greatest. Gabriel Goodman, Doctor of Theology, fifth Dean of this church, which he headed with great praise for 40 years; and at Ruthin in Denbighshire, where he was born, he founded a hospital and instituted a school. Dear to God and good people for his holiness of life, he departed piously for the heavenly country on 17 June 1601, aged 73.

== Legacy ==
In 1583 and 1598 Goodman gave two bells inscribed “Campanis Patrem Laudate Sonantibus Cultum. Gabriel Goodman Decanus 1598” (bells sounding worship praise the father) to Westminster Abbey which are still in use to this day.

In his will Goodman left his library of religious books in the “…. special care of the President and Warden” …will see that there will be no lack of preaching in St Peter's Church of Ruthin, or any other in that Deanery where they may do good”.

Goodman's motto was Dei Gratia Sum Quod Sum “By the Grace of God I am What I am”. It appears on the front gable of a row of houses called Providence Place in Woking, Surrey.
