= Grade II listed buildings in Rhosddu =

Map of the community in Wrexham County Borough.

In the United Kingdom, the term listed building refers to a building or other structure officially designated as being of special architectural, historical, or cultural significance; Grade II structures are those considered to be "buildings of special interest which justify every effort being made to preserve them". Listing was begun by a provision in the Town and Country Planning Act 1947. Once listed, strict limitations are imposed on the modifications allowed to a building's structure or fittings. In Wales, the authority for listing under the Planning (Listed Buildings and Conservation Areas) Act 1990 rests with Cadw.

This is a list of the 60 Grade II listed buildings in the community of Rhosddu, in Wrexham County Borough.

Name	Location Grid Ref. (Note: Sometimes known as OSGB36, the grid reference is based on the British national grid reference system used by the Ordnance Survey.) Geo-coordinates	Date Listed	Type/Function	Notes	Reference Number	Image
61 King Street, Clwyd	Rhosddu; SJ3337550658; 53.049013°N 2.9953288°W	30 May 1951	Commercial		16507	–
26 Grosvenor Road	Rhosddu; SJ3335250744; 53.049784°N 2.9956896°W	31 January 1994	Domestic		1832	–
63 King Street	Rhosddu; SJ3337850666; 53.049086°N 2.9952857°W	30 May 1951	Domestic		16508	–
Abbotsfield Priory Hotel	Rhosddu; SJ3334450850; 53.050735°N 2.9958309°W	31 January 1994	Domestic		1853	–
Boundary Wall, Gate Piers and Gates at Trinity Presbyterian Church of Wales	Rhosddu; SJ3339850628; 53.048747°N 2.9949795°W	31 January 1994			16511	–
Butcher's Market	Rhosddu; SJ3357350249; 53.045362°N 2.9922911°W	6 June 1980	Domestic		1840	–
Central Arcade	Rhosddu; SJ3353750251; 53.045376°N 2.9928284°W	31 January 1994	Domestic		1843	–
Church of St James	Rhosddu; SJ3323351141; 53.053337°N 2.997547°W	31 January 1994	Transport		1854	–
Epworth Lodge	Rhosddu; SJ3353150997; 53.05208°N 2.9930721°W	31 January 1994	Agriculture and Subsistence		1836	–
Fern Bank and former Coach House	Rhosddu; SJ3351650980; 53.051925°N 2.9932923°W	31 January 1994	Domestic		1835	–
General Market Building	Rhosddu; SJ3358650314; 53.045948°N 2.9921107°W	4 June 1985	Health and Welfare		1838	–
General Market Building	Rhosddu; SJ3357450326; 53.046054°N 2.9922921°W	4 June 1985	Domestic		16493	–
General Market Building	Rhosddu; SJ3357750320; 53.046001°N 2.9922461°W	4 June 1985	Domestic		16494	–
General Market Building	Rhosddu; SJ3357850314; 53.045947°N 2.99223°W	4 June 1985	Domestic		16495	–
General Market Building	Rhosddu; SJ3358050310; 53.045911°N 2.9921993°W	4 June 1985	Domestic		16496	–
General Market Building	Rhosddu; SJ3358450303; 53.045849°N 2.9921382°W	4 June 1985	Domestic		16498	–
General Market Building - Public Convenience (Ladies)	Rhosddu; SJ3359250303; 53.04585°N 2.9920189°W	4 June 1985	Domestic		16499	–
General Market Buildings	Rhosddu; SJ3358450305; 53.045867°N 2.9921386°W	4 June 1985			16497	–
Midland Bank	Rhosddu; SJ3360250245; 53.04533°N 2.9918578°W	31 January 1994	Gardens, Parks and Urban Spaces		1842	–
National Westminster Bank	Rhosddu; SJ3351950272; 53.045562°N 2.9931012°W	31 January 1994			1845	–
Newi: Plas Coch (former Denbighshire Technical College)	Rhosddu; SJ3269051107; 53.052963°N 3.0056395°W	31 January 1994			1851	–
No. 10, High Street, Clwyd	Rhosddu; SJ3356850234; 53.045227°N 2.9923626°W	16 June 1980	Domestic		16501	–
No. 11, High Street, Clwyd	Rhosddu; SJ3358350236; 53.045247°N 2.9921393°W	16 June 1980			16502	–
No. 24, Chester Street (W side), Clwyd	Rhosddu; SJ3359350485; 53.047486°N 2.9920416°W	31 January 1994	Transport		16491	–
No. 28, Grosvenor Road (SE side), Clwyd	Rhosddu; SJ3335650751; 53.049847°N 2.9956314°W	31 January 1994	Domestic		16492	–
No. 40, Henblas Street, Clwyd	Rhosddu; SJ3358850287; 53.045706°N 2.9920753°W	16 June 1980			16503	–
No. 55, King Street (W side), Clwyd	Rhosddu; SJ3336350645; 53.048895°N 2.995505°W	30 May 1951	Domestic		1847	–
No. 57, King Street (W side), Clwyd	Rhosddu; SJ3336750648; 53.048923°N 2.995446°W	30 May 1951			16505	–
No. 59, King Street (W side), Clwyd	Rhosddu; SJ3337050654; 53.048977°N 2.9954025°W	30 May 1951	Gardens, Parks and Urban Spaces		16506	–
No. 65, Acton Gate (N side), Garden Village, Clwyd	Rhosddu; SJ3362651963; 53.060774°N 2.9918545°W	31 January 1994	Domestic		1858	–
No. 65, King Street (W side), Clwyd	Rhosddu; SJ3338250668; 53.049104°N 2.9952264°W	30 May 1951	Domestic		16509	–
No. 67, Acton Gate (N side), Garden Village, Clwyd	Rhosddu; SJ3363951964; 53.060784°N 2.9916607°W	31 January 1994	Domestic		16512	–
No. 69, Acton Gate (N side), Garden Village, Clwyd	Rhosddu; SJ3366251967; 53.060814°N 2.9913182°W	31 January 1994	Domestic		1859	–
No. 71, Acton Gate (N side), Garden Village, Clwyd	Rhosddu; SJ3367351971; 53.060851°N 2.9911549°W	31 January 1994	Education		16513	–
No. 8, High Street (N side), Clwyd	Rhosddu; SJ3355750239; 53.04527°N 2.9925277°W	16 June 1980			1839	–
No. 9, High Street (N side), Clwyd	Rhosddu; SJ3355750250; 53.045369°N 2.9925299°W	16 June 1980	Religious, Ritual and Funerary		16500	–
No. 1, Grosvenor Road (NW side), Clwyd	Rhosddu; SJ3316250560; 53.048106°N 2.9984853°W	24 October 1991	Religious, Ritual and Funerary		1830	–
No. 2, Grosvenor Road (SE side), Clwyd	Rhosddu; SJ3320050510; 53.047661°N 2.9979081°W	31 January 1994	Domestic		1831	–
No. 26, Chester Street (W side), Clwyd	Rhosddu; SJ3359550501; 53.04763°N 2.992015°W	31 January 1994	Domestic		1825	–
No. 27, Chester Street (W side), Clwyd	Rhosddu; SJ3359550506; 53.047675°N 2.9920161°W	16 June 1980	Domestic		1826	–
No. 28, Chester Street (W side), Clwyd	Rhosddu; SJ3359750509; 53.047702°N 2.9919869°W	31 January 1994	Commercial		1827	–
No. 29, Chester Street (W side), Clwyd	Rhosddu; SJ3359150518; 53.047782°N 2.9920782°W	30 May 1951	Commercial		1828	–
No. 63, Acton Gate (N side), Garden Village, Clwyd	Rhosddu; SJ3360751952; 53.060672°N 2.9921357°W	31 January 1994	Commercial		1857	–
No. 9, Grove Road (NW side), Clwyd	Rhosddu; SJ3350350969; 53.051825°N 2.9934839°W	31 January 1994	Commercial		1834	–
Nos. 1-3, Queen Street, Clwyd	Rhosddu; SJ3348250340; 53.046169°N 2.9936671°W	31 January 1994	Religious, Ritual and Funerary		16504	–
Nos.1, 3 & 5, with Nos. 56, 58 & 60 Regent Street, King Street (W side)	Rhosddu; SJ3321850482; 53.047412°N 2.9976339°W	31 January 1993	Religious, Ritual and Funerary		1846	–
Nos. 10-12, (even), Weston Drive (NE side), Clwyd	Rhosddu; SJ3286151765; 53.058898°N 3.0032262°W	31 January 1994	Domestic		1856	–
Old Library	Rhosddu; SJ3348950434; 53.047014°N 2.9935821°W	23 December 1975	Commercial		1852	–
Plas Gwilym	Rhosddu; SJ3343750917; 53.051349°N 2.9944576°W	31 January 1994	Domestic		1833	–
Romano	Rhosddu; SJ3347450865; 53.050886°N 2.993895°W	31 January 1994	Domestic		1837	–
Stansty Cottage	Rhosddu; SJ3288051682; 53.058155°N 3.0029254°W	16 June 1980	Domestic		1850	–
The Coach House	Rhosddu; SJ3339050675; 53.049168°N 2.9951086°W	30 May 1951	Domestic		16510	–
The Golden Lion Public House	Rhosddu; SJ3358850240; 53.045283°N 2.9920656°W	16 June 1980	Health and Welfare		1841	–
The Old Registry Office	Rhosddu; SJ3359450473; 53.047378°N 2.9920242°W	16 June 1980	Domestic		1823	–
The Old Vaults Public House	Rhosddu; SJ3361150279; 53.045636°N 2.9917306°W	31 January 1994	Domestic		1822	–
The Seven Stars Public House	Rhosddu; SJ3359850431; 53.047001°N 2.9919558°W	31 January 1994	Gardens, Parks and Urban Spaces		1849	–
The Talbot Public House	Rhosddu; SJ3347750320; 53.045988°N 2.9937375°W	31 January 1994	Gardens, Parks and Urban Spaces		1844	–
Trinity Presbyterian Church of Wales	Rhosddu; SJ3338350615; 53.048628°N 2.9952005°W	31 January 1994	Domestic		1848	–
Wingett House	Rhosddu; SJ3359850489; 53.047522°N 2.9919678°W	31 January 1994	Commercial		1824	–
Wrexham General Station: Entrance Building	Rhosddu; SJ3296350796; 53.050202°N 3.0015025°W	5 September 1986			1855	–

== See also ==
- Grade II listed buildings in Wrexham County Borough
- Grade II listed buildings in Acton, Wrexham
- Grade II listed buildings in Caia Park
- Grade II listed buildings in Offa, Wrexham
