= Trinity Presbyterian Church =

Trinity Presbyterian Church may refer to:

in Australia

- Trinity Presbyterian Church in Camberwell, Victoria, a church associated with The Fellowship group in Australia

in the United Kingdom

- Trinity Presbyterian Church, Wrexham

in the United States

- Trinity Presbyterian Church (Charlottesville, Virginia)
- Trinity Presbyterian Church (Montgomery, Alabama)
- Trinity Presbyterian Church (San Francisco, California), listed on the National Register of Historic Places and a San Francisco Designated Landmark
- Trinity Presbyterian Church (Tucson, Arizona)
- Trinity Avenue Presbyterian Church, Durham, North Carolina

== See also ==
- Trinity Church, Barrow-in-Furness, England, formerly a Presbyterian church
