= Fellowship (disambiguation) =

A fellowship is a position in a learned society or professional association.

Fellowship or The Fellowship may also refer to:

== Arts and entertainment ==
- Fellowship, subtitled Monthly Bulletin of the Aboriginal-Australian Fellowship, a bulletin of the Aboriginal-Australian Fellowship published in Sydney 1960–1968
- Fellowship (album), by Lizz Wright, 2010
- "Fellowship" (short story), by Franz Kafka
- The Fellowship, the protagonists in Tolkien's The Fellowship of the Ring
  - Fellowship!, a musical stage play parody of The Fellowship of the Ring
- The Fellowship, a fictional group in the video game series Ultima

== Places ==
- Fellowship, Florida, U.S.
- Fellowship, New Jersey, U.S.

== Religion ==
- Christian fellowship
- Fellowship, a term used in Anabaptism used for a Christian denomination
- Fellowship Church, a church in Grapevine, Texas, U.S.
- The Fellowship (Australia), a group within the Presbyterian Church of Australia
- The Fellowship (Canada), a conservative Baptist association
- The Fellowship (Christian organization), a U.S.-based religious and political organization
- The Fellowship (FGFCMI), a fellowship of like-minded Pentecostal churches and ministers

== Other uses ==
- Fellowship (medicine), a period of medical training
- Fellowship (racehorse) (fl. 2000s), a Hong Kong Thoroughbred racehorse
- Fellowship Party, a former political party in the United Kingdom
- Fokker F28 Fellowship, a twin engine jet airliner

== See also ==
- The Fellowship of the Ring (disambiguation)
- Koinonia, referring to communion, or fellowship within the Christian church
