= Talbot Hotel =

Talbot Hotel may refer to:

== England ==
- The Talbot Hotel (Northamptonshire), Oundle, Northamptonshire
- Talbot Hotel, Malton, North Yorkshire
- Talbot Hotel, a listed building in Chipping, Lancashire
- Talbot Hotel, a 13th-century hotel in Tregaron
- Royal Talbot Hotel, Lostwithiel, Cornwall
- The Talbot, Stow-on-the-Wold, a former hotel in Stow-on-the-Wold, Gloucestershire

== Wales ==
- Talbot Hotel, a pub in Berriew, Welshpool, Powys
- The Talbot, Wrexham, a building in Wrexham, Wales which housed a hotel known as the Talbot Hotel.
