= Grade II listed buildings in Acton, Wrexham =

Map of the community in Wrexham County Borough.

In the United Kingdom, the term listed building refers to a building or other structure officially designated as being of special architectural, historical, or cultural significance; Grade II structures are those considered to be "buildings of special interest which justify every effort being made to preserve them". Listing was begun by a provision in the Town and Country Planning Act 1947. Once listed, strict limitations are imposed on the modifications allowed to a building's structure or fittings. In Wales, the authority for listing under the Planning (Listed Buildings and Conservation Areas) Act 1990 rests with Cadw.

This is a list of the eleven Grade II listed buildings in the community of Acton, in Wrexham County Borough.

Name	Location Grid Ref. (Note: Sometimes known as OSGB36, the grid reference is based on the British national grid reference system used by the Ordnance Survey.) Geo-coordinates	Date Listed	Type	Notes	Reference Number	Image
95, Dean Road, Wrexham, Clwyd, LL139EG	Acton; SJ3486051550; 53.057214°N 2.9733605°W	31 January 1994	Building		16471	–
Acton Park Lodge	Acton; SJ3376051831; 53.059604°N 2.9898281°W	31 January 1994	Lodge		1749	–
Cherry Hill	Acton; SJ3525452131; 53.062484°N 2.9675999°W	31 January 1994	Residence		1747	–
Entrance Screen to former drive of Acton Drive	Acton; SJ3374551816; 53.059467°N 2.9900488°W	03 November 1969	Entrance screen		1748	–
Former Grove Park School	Acton; SJ3367850843; 53.050714°N 2.9908476°W	29 November 2016	Former school		87719	
No. 35 Chester Street (E side), Clwyd	Acton; SJ3362050466; 53.047318°N 2.9916349°W	31 January 1994	Residence, Office		1750	–
No. 93, Dean Road (W side), Clwyd	Acton; SJ3486451544; 53.05716°N 2.9732996°W	31 January 1994	Building		1751	–
Royal Welch Fusiliers Memorial	Acton; SJ3363650636; 53.048848°N 2.9914314°W	31 January 1994	Memorial		1746	
St Giles House	Acton; SJ3405751360; 53.055408°N 2.9853006°W	31 January 1994	Education centre, former children's home		1754	–
The Cottage	Acton; SJ3376251070; 53.052765°N 2.9896415°W	31 January 1994	Residence		1753	–
The Lodge	Acton; SJ3481151654; 53.058143°N 2.9741126°W	31 January 1994	Building		1752	–

== See also ==
- Grade II listed buildings in Wrexham County Borough
- Grade II listed buildings in Caia Park
- Grade II listed buildings in Offa, Wrexham
- Grade II listed buildings in Rhosddu
