= Grove Road, Wrexham =

Road in Wrexham, Wales

Grove Road
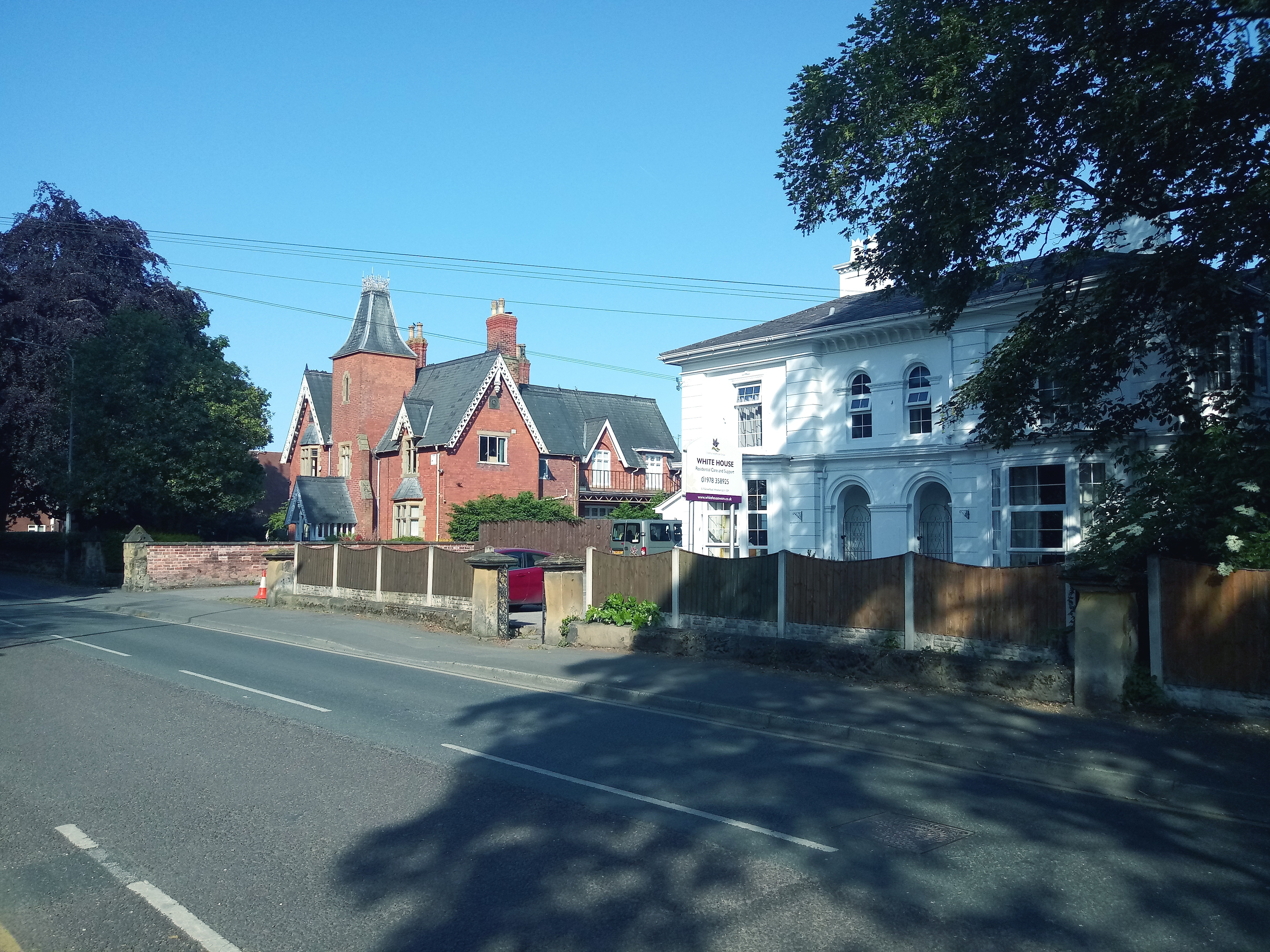
- Nos. 3 and 5 on the road.
- Interactive map of Grove Road
- Native name: Ffordd y Llwyni (Welsh)
- Part of: Rhosddu
- Location: Wrexham, Wales
- Coordinates: 53.0515°N 2.9935°W

Grove Road (Welsh: Ffordd y Llwyni) is a road in Wrexham, North Wales. It dates to the 18th century and contains listed buildings. It is within the Grosvenor Road Conservation Area.

== Description and history ==
Grove Road dates to the 18th century, along with the adjoining Grosvenor Road. They were laid out between 1861 and 1881 as part of a prestigious residential area catered to the growing middle class of Wrexham. At the time, Grove Road was known as Pant y Crydd (Welsh for 'shoemaker's hollow') and Erw (Welsh for 'Acre') row. By the 19th century, the area in which Grove Road is in became known as Grove Park.

Grove Road is part of the Grosvenor Road Conservation Area.

=== Listed buildings ===
==== Romano ====
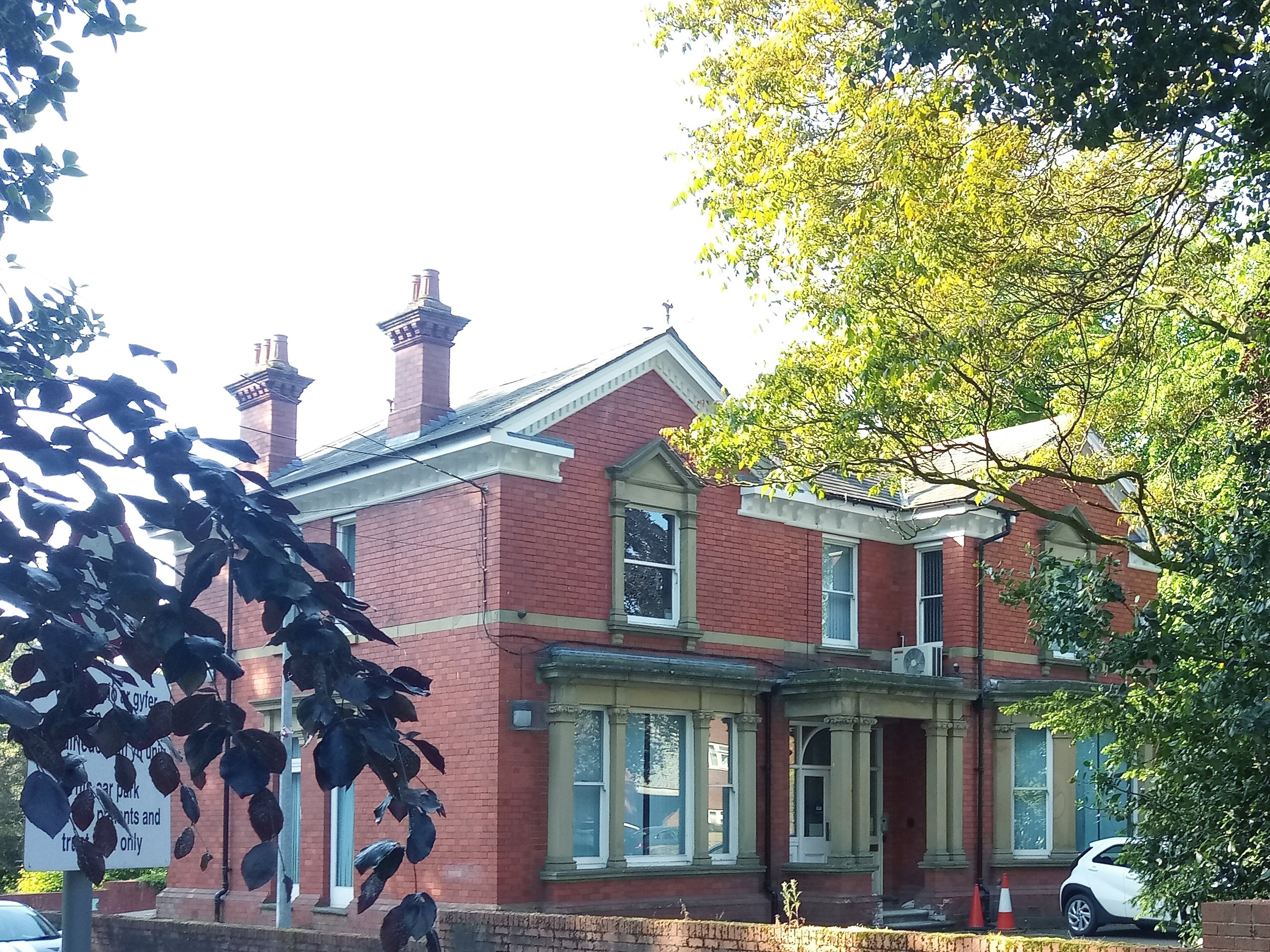
Romano, No. 4.

Romano (No. 4) is a Grade II listed building on the north-eastern end of Grove Road, as part of a late 19th century villa development. It is situated in an enclosed garden, and was built in 1865 as a manse to the Bryn y Ffynnon Methodist Church, with the building now being a private house. Its exterior is of random rubble with a slate roof. It is shaped in an L-plan with a central entrance hall and two storeys. It is in a Gothic style. It was built to the designs of J. R. Gummow. In the 1940s it served as a nurses home for the Wrexham and East Denbighshire War Memorial Hospital. In the 1970s a large part of the house's grounds were removed for a new link road between Rhosddu Road / Grosvenor Road to the Chester Road / Powell Road junction. The building was extended in its rear in 1993, and now serves as offices.

==== Plas Gwilym ====
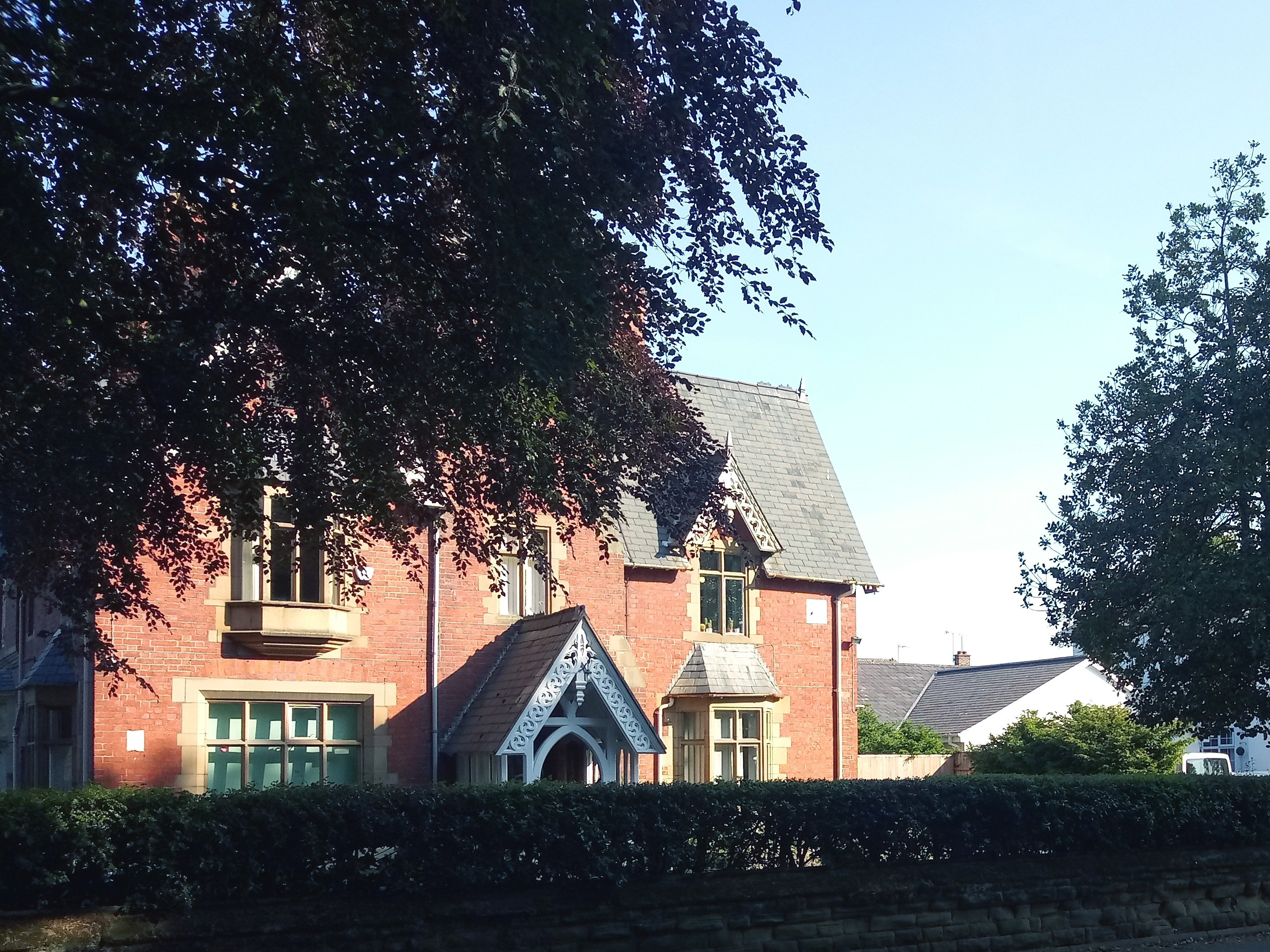
Plas Gwilym, No. 3.

Plas Gwilym (No. 3), originally known as Leeswood House, is a Grade II listed building situated on the south-western end of the road. It is the first surviving building dating to the 19th century on this side of Grove Road. It was built between 1861 and 1866, possibly in the designs of J. R. Gummow, and built for S. T. Baugh. It was first called Leeswood House, but became known as Plas Gwilym by 1910. The building became home to offices in 1851.

Its exterior is of brick with stone dressings, and it has a slate roof. It has two storeys, and a central entrance. Its interior retails most of its surviving original plan and original decorative details. Such surviving details include a tiled entrance hall, fireplaces, and a detailed top-lit staircase.

==== No. 9 ====
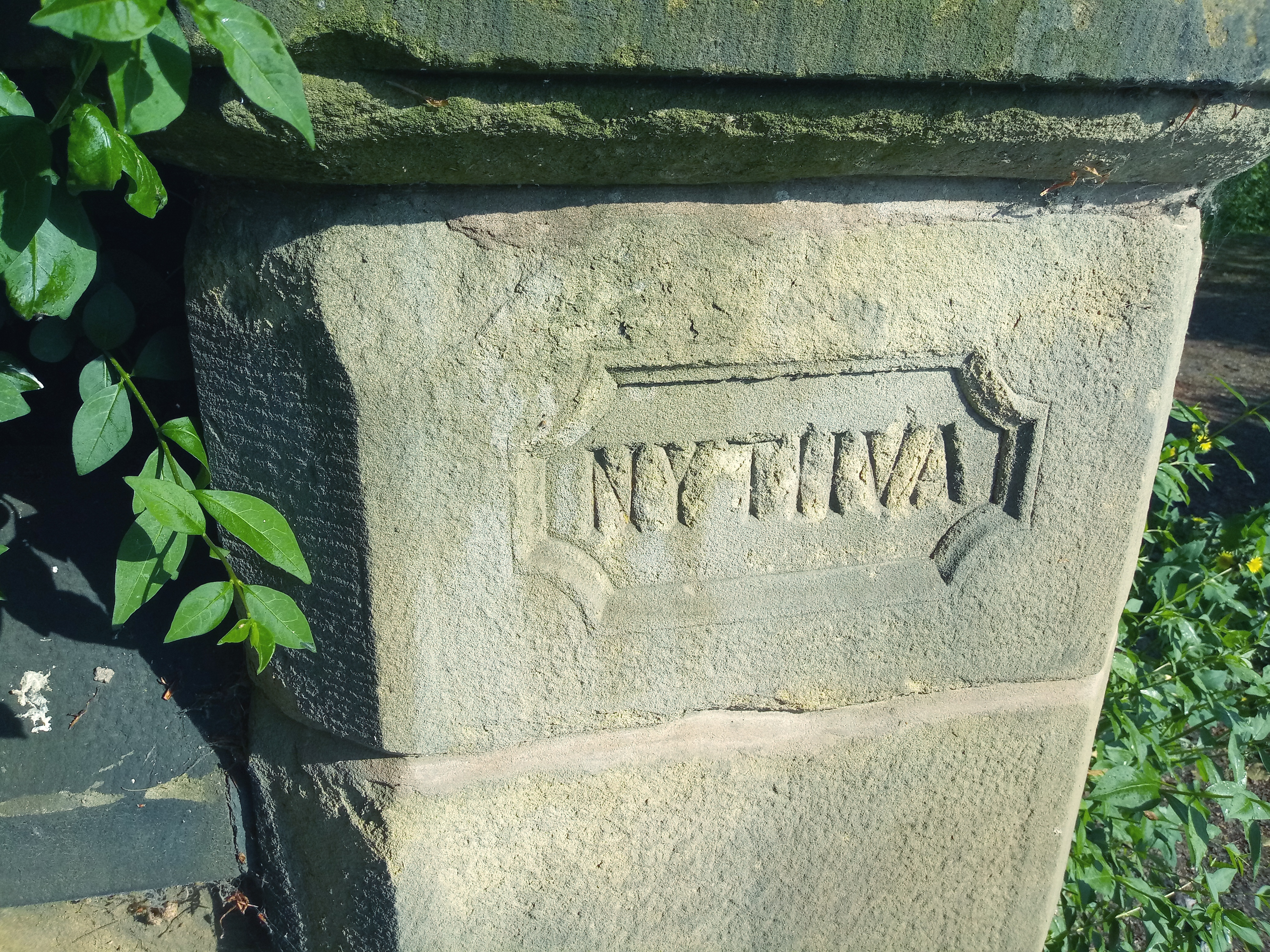
Nythva engraved into the original stone gate pier of No. 9.

No. 9, originally called Ivy Grove, is a 19th-century villa on the western side of Grove Road. It is a Grade II listed building, and the house dates to 1881. It is two-storeys and is set within its own enclosed gardens. The house's exterior is a roughcast render, over brick, and it has a slate roof. It was renamed to Nythfa in 1898, and is still used as a house to this day.

==== Fern Bank ====
Fern Bank (No. 11), also spelled Fernbank and originally called Albert Villa, is a house built in 1873, designed by J. R. Gummow. It was built for Ezekial Mason, and located between Epworth Lodge and No. 9, set back from the road. Its exterior is brick, and it has a slate roof. Its architect Gummow, described it as an "Anglo-Italian cottage". It is two-storeys and arranged in an L-plan. At the rear of the house is an adjoining former coach house, that is two-storeys and has a hipped roof. It adopted the name "Fernbank" (or "Fern Bank") in 1885, and is still used as a house today.

==== Epworth Lodge ====
Epworth Lodge was built in 1865 as a manse to the Bryn y Ffynnon Methodist Church (or Brynyffynon Wesleyan Church) located on Regent Street, although now serves as a private house since 1967. It is located towards the north-eastern end of Grove Road, situated in an enclosed garden. Its exterior is of random rubble with a slate roof. It is shaped in an L-plan with a central entrance hall and two storeys. It is in a Gothic style.
