= Abbotsfield, Wrexham =

Grade II listed building in Wrexham, Wales

Abbotsfield
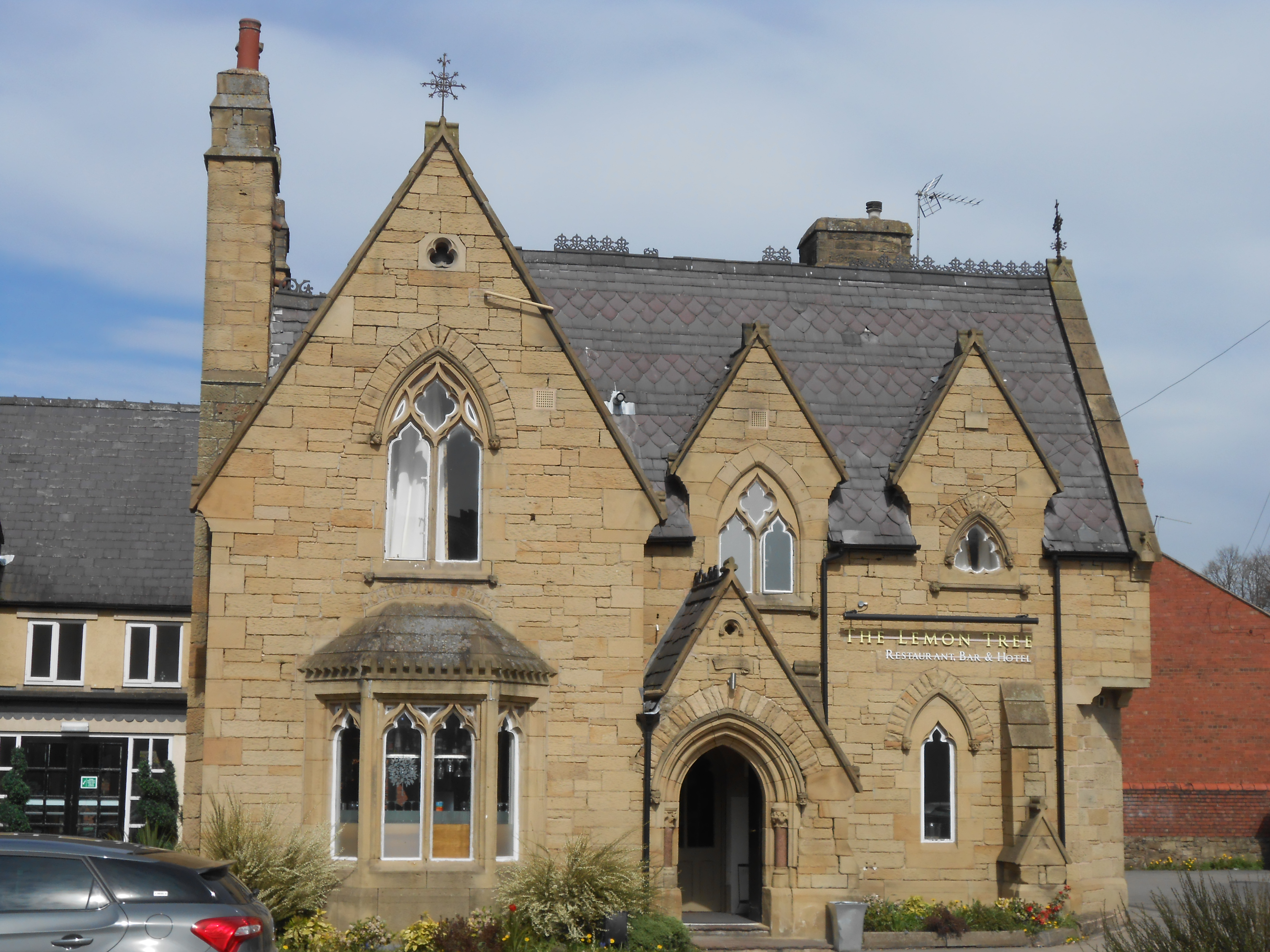
- The building's entrance
- Former names: Abbotsfield Priory Hotel
- Alternative names: The Lemon Tree Restaurant

General information
- Type: Private residence (1863–20th century Council Area Education Office (20th century–1970s); Wartime nursery (20th century); Hotel (1982–present); Restaurant (2000–present)
- Architectural style: Neo-Gothic
- Location: Rhosddu, Wrexham, Wales, 29 Rhosddu Road
- Coordinates: 53.050735°N 2.995831°W
- Completed: 1863–1865
- Renovated: 2010; 2020–21
- Owner: Sam and Emma Regan (2014)

Technical details
- Floor count: 2

Design and construction
- Architect: James Reynolds Gummow

Listed Building – Grade II
- Official name: Abbotsfield Priory Hotel
- Designated: 31 January 1994
- Reference no.: 1853

Abbotsfield is a Grade II listed building in Rhosddu, Wrexham, North Wales.

It was formerly a private residence, and later a council office, until it was converted into the Abbotsfield Priory Hotel in the 1970s, later adding a restaurant and bar. The building is now The Lemon Tree restaurant, bar and hotel.

== Description ==
The building is located on the corner of Grosvenor Road and Rhosddu Road, It is two storeys, grade II listed, and in the neo-Gothic style. The building is of coursed and squared tooled sandstone, with the roof being made of slate and has scalloped bands and ridge cresting. The building is arranged as a L-plan with its entrance located at the centre, at the angle of the building's wings. The building's entrance contains an asymmetric gabled porch with polished granite shafts to a deep-moulded arch engraved with the text "Trust in God" on a scroll.

To the doorway's left is an advanced wing. While the interior of the building has largely retained its original layout, with details such as the encaustic-tiled entrance hall, and quatrefoil rossette panelled staircase still surviving.

== History ==
The building was designed in the 1860s by local architect James Reynolds Gummow as a private residence for Edward Jones. The building was the first house built on the Rhosddu end of Grosvenor Road, and was constructed and built from 1863 to 1865.

In 1895, it was the home of John Arthur Eyton-Jones, a local surgeon. It later became an Area Education Office for the Denbighshire and later Clwyd council.

During the World Wars, one wing of the building served as the Abbotsfield Priory War Nursery.

The council later sold building in the 1970s to become a hotel in 1982 as the Abbotsfield Priory Hotel, a family-run hotel with fourteen bedrooms by 1995. When it became a hotel and a bar in the 1970s and 1980s, various older pieces of other older Wrexham buildings were moved into the building, such as a mahogany bar from the Raglan Arms on Lambpit Street, with the mahogany structure serving as the building's bar.

In 2000, the building was converted into Graffiti Italiano, an Italian restaurant. It is now "The Lemon Tree" restaurant, bar and independently owned hotel, with twelve and later 18 bedrooms. The hotel building underwent a complete refurbishment in March 2010, with the name "The Lemon Tree" being added, and was further renovated in 2020–21. In December 2014, the restaurant was taken over by locals Sam Regan and his wife Emma. The restaurant served food they self-described as "modern British".
