= 2 Grosvenor Road, Wrexham =

Grade II listed building in Wrexham, Wales

2 Grosvenor Road
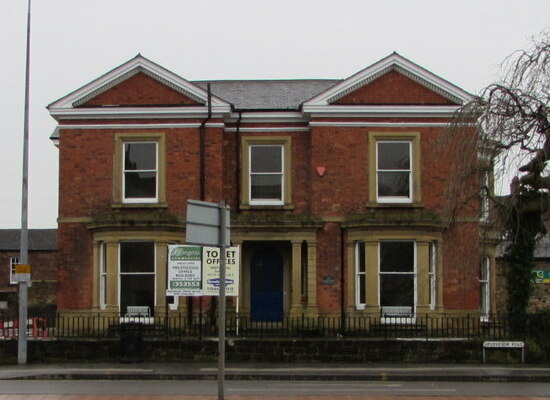
- Building from Grosvenor Road
- Former names: Brynhyfryd

General information
- Type: Register office (possibly; 20th century)
- Architectural style: Simplified Italianate villa
- Location: Grosvenor Road, Wrexham, Wales
Other details
Coordinates	53.0477°N 2.9979°W
Completed	1868
Technical details
Floor count	2
Design and construction
Architect(s)	J.R. Gummow (possibly)
Listed Building – Grade II
Official name	NO.2 GROSVENOR ROAD (SE SIDE),,,,,CLWYD,
Designated	31 January 1994
Reference no.	1831

2 Grosvenor Road, originally Brynhyfryd, is a Grade II listed building on Regent Street and Grosvenor Road, in Wrexham, North Wales.

It was built in 1868, possibly by J.R. Gummow and is in a simplified Italianate villa style.

== Description and history ==
Located on the corner of Regent Street and Grosvenor Road, near Wrexham Cathedral, it was built in 1868, and was the first house built on Grosvenor Road. It was originally named Brynhyfryd and is of a simplified Italianate villa style. The building served as Wrexham’s register office, an Assistance Board Area Office, and a private residence.

It was possibly designed by J.R. Gummow, a local architect, who is credited with most of the suburban development in the southern parts of Wrexham in the 19th century.

The building's exterior is made of brick, with some ashlar dressings. It has a slate roof and is two storeys. The building's entrance is located at its centre and fronts Grosvenor Road. The entrance is in a narrow central bay, which is recessed within a porch. The Regent Street return elevation of the building is a pedimented central gable with bay windows. While the opposite return elevation is the same but lacks a central bay window.

== See also ==
- Grosvenor Lodge, Wrexham (No.1) – Similar building located opposite
