= Grosvenor Lodge, Wrexham =

Grade II listed building in Wrexham, Wales

Grosvenor Lodge
- Porthdy Grosvenor (Welsh)
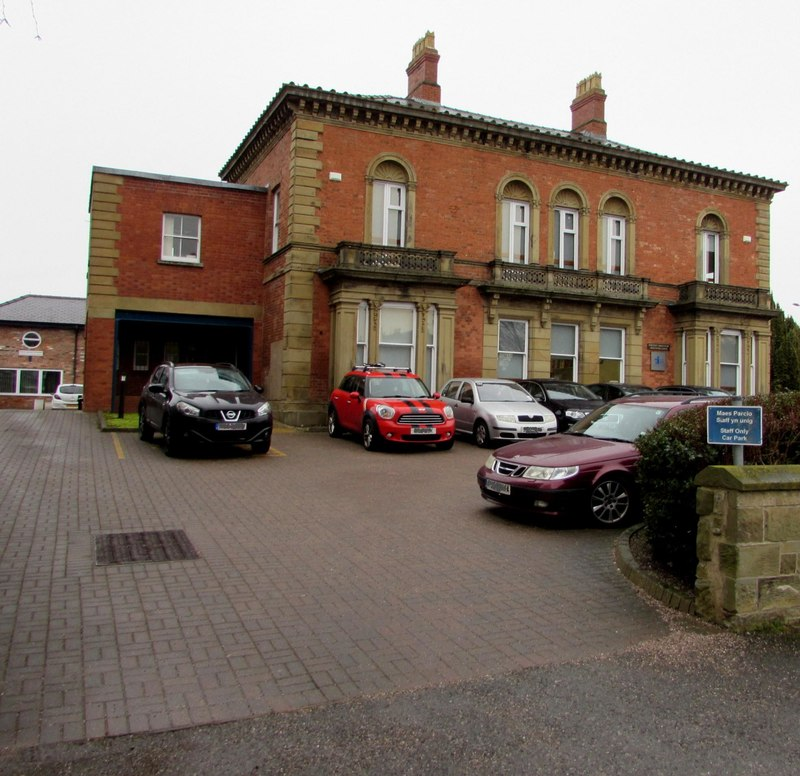
- The building from Regent Street
- Alternative names: No 1. Grosvenor Road

General information
- Type: Private residence (1869–1924); Office (1924–) (present); Medical clinic (–1990s)
- Architectural style: Italianate villa
- Address: 1 Grosvenor Road, Wrexham, Wales
- Coordinates: 53.0481°N 2.9985°W
- Renovated: 2001

Technical details
- Floor count: 2

Design and construction
- Architect(s): J.R. Gummow

Listed Building – Grade II
- Official name: NO.1 GROSVENOR ROAD (NW SIDE),,,,,CLWYD,
- Designated: 24 October 1991; Amended 31 January 1994
- Reference no.: 1830

Grosvenor Lodge (later 1 Grosvenor Road) is a Grade II listed building on Regent Street and Grosvenor Road, in Wrexham, North Wales.

It was built in 1869 by J.R. Gummow and is in an Italianate villa style. It was initially a private residence for Isacc Shone, later mayor of Wrexham. It was purchased by Wrexham council in 1924, in which it became initially an office, then later a medical clinic until the 1990s. It underwent a restoration in 2001.

== History ==
The building is situated on the corner of Regent Street and Grosvenor Road, opposite Wrexham Cathedral. Grosvenor Lodge was built in 1869 as a residence for Isaac Shone, who became Mayor of Wrexham in 1878. It was designed by J.R. Gummow, a local architect, who is credited with most of the suburban development in the southern parts of Wrexham in the 19th century. Shone lost his council seat in 1879 and thereafter vacated the residence and moved to London. It also served as the home of Robert Graesser and his family.

In the early 1900s, the building became home to Wrexham's first female doctor, Katharine Rosebery Drinkwater, who moved to Wrexham, after her marriage to a local GP. She became the Assistant School Medical Officer for Wrexham in 1907.

In 1924, the building was bought by Wrexham council from the executors of Shone's will. The council then repurposed the building to be first used as office space and then later as a health clinic until the 1990s. It was listed as a Grade II listed building by Cadw in 1991. In 2001, a full restoration of the building was carried out. As of 2024, the building is home to Cafcass Cymru.

Until 1959, the Royal Welch Fusiliers War Memorial stood outside the building until its relocation to Chester Street.

== Description ==
The building is designed in a Italianate villa style, which was described as "Anglo-Italian" by its architect Gummow. Its exterior is made of brick, while it contains a slate roof. The lodge is two storeys high, with its main elevations being its two-window Regent Street entrance front, and a symmetrical five-window (in 1–3–1) range facing Regent Street.

There is a lower service wing recessed to the building's rear containing hipped roof, a side entrance, and above it a tripartite sash window, and moulded wood bracketed oversailing-eaves. After its initial construction a three-storeyed and hipped roof tower was added to the building.

The building's entrance is located to the right of the building situated in an advanced porch and within a segmental archway, shaped in a round arch with panelled double doors.

== See also ==
- 2 Grosvenor Road, Wrexham – Similar building located opposite
