= Chester Street, Wrexham =

Street in Wrexham, Wales

Chester Street
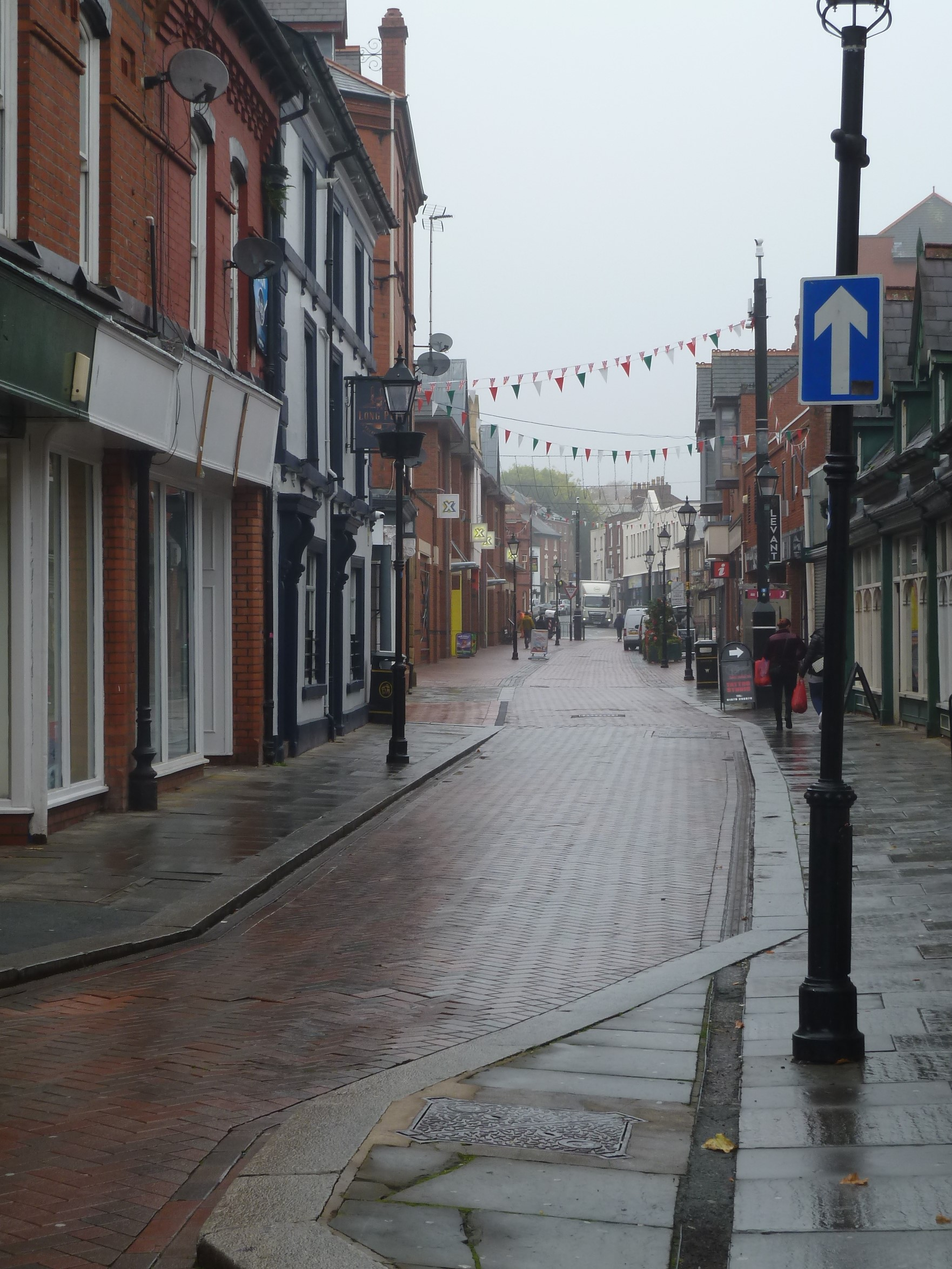
- Looking down the street from near the junction with Charles Street
- Interactive map of Chester Street
- Native name: Stryt Caer (Welsh)
- Part of: Wrexham city centre
- Namesake: Chester
- Location: Wrexham, Wales
- Coordinates: 53.0467°N 2.9916°W

Chester Street (Welsh: Stryt Caer; rarely Stryd Caer) is a street in Wrexham city centre, North Wales. It was once a main north–south road on the edge of the centre of Wrexham. The street has several listed buildings, as well as Wrexham's civic centre containing various council, memorial and leisure buildings, Coleg Cambria's Yale campus, Tŷ Pawb (former People's Market) and various historical buildings now demolished.

== Listed buildings ==
=== Chester Street terrace ===
On the western side of Chester Street is a terrace comprising seven individual townhouses. They largely date from the early 19th century and are addressed between No. 23 to No. 29 Chester Street. They are listed together due to their combined importance as a rare early 19th-century streetscape in Wrexham which needs to be considered together in the event of any demolitions and ensure preservation.

==== Old Registry Office ====
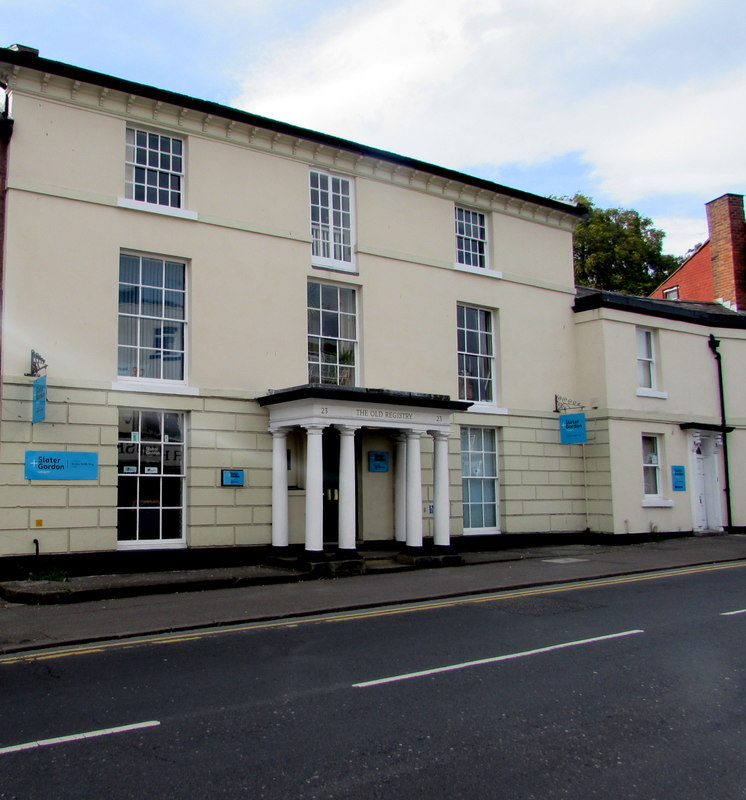
The Old Registry Office

The Old Registry Office (No. 23) is on the western side of Chester Street, north of Chester Street's junction with Lambpit Street, and part of a continuous building line. It is listed as an important local example of an early 18th-century townhouse, which was built as a residence. It was later used as a children's home from 1902, belonging to the Waifs and Strays Society who operated the St. Giles Home for Boys from the building until they moved to a site on Rhosnesni Lane. Following that, before and during World War I, it served as a refugee shelter for Belgians. It then served as Wrexham's (district) register office, from the 1920s to 1978, and is now a solicitors office. Alfred Neobard Palmer made references to a "Chester Street House", which was "new" by 1727, and that may refer to this building. The three-storeyed building's exterior seems to have been remodelled in the late 18th century, with it having stucco over brick, which is rusticated to the ground floor. The building's porch is of portico and has coupled Tuscan columns. The building's original interior layout largely survives almost intact, with a central entrance hall divided by an archway, while stairs are located at the rear. Multiple rooms of the building retain their early 18th-century plasterwork and joinery details, while some enriched plaster ceiling was renewed after being damaged by a fire.

In 2018, planning permission was granted to convert the building into apartments, although this was not acted upon. In March 2024, a planning application was submitted to Wrexham council to turn the building into an aparthotel of thirteen rooms. The plans were approved in August 2024.

==== No. 24 ====
No. 24 is on the western side of Chester Street, north of Chester Street's junction with Lambpit Street, forming part of a rare 19th-century streetscape in Wrexham. It was probably built after the construction of Wingett House, which No. 24 is connected to at ground level, which was built in c. 1800. No. 24 was first built as a residence, now being used for commercial use. The exterior of the two-storeyed building is a rendering over brick, with a central entrance and its roof made of slate.

==== Wingett House ====
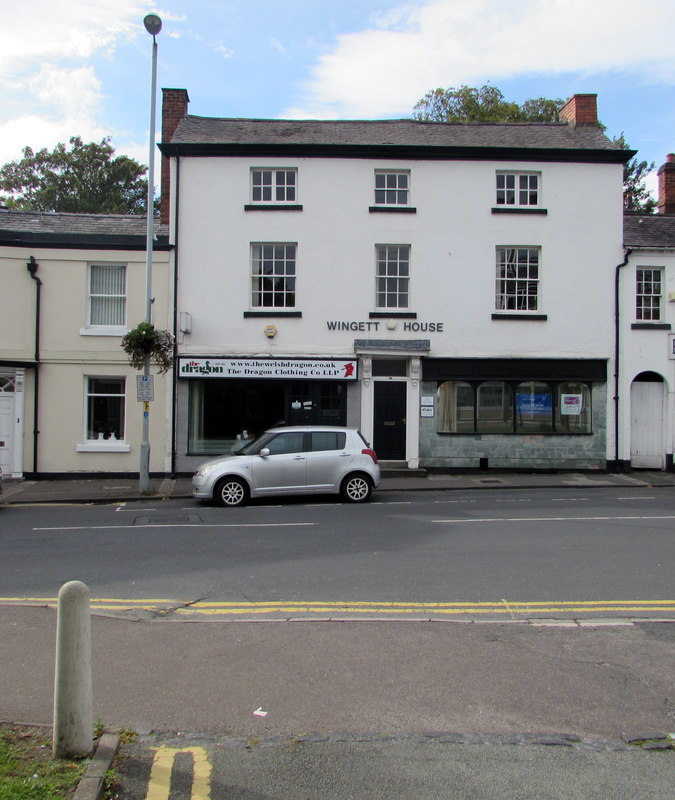
Wingett House

Wingett House (No. 25) is on the western side of Chester Street, north of Chester Street's junction with Lambpit Street, forming part of a terrace and a rare 19th-century streetscape in Wrexham. It was built in c. 1800 as a residence, although possibly was also initially to house office accommodation. It is linked with No. 24, built slightly after, linked via the ground floor, with both buildings serving for commercial use today. Wingett House's exterior is a rendering over brick, with a slate roof, central entrance, and the building being three storeys. There are inserted shop and office frontages on the building's ground floor. Internally, the building has been heavily modified from its original design when it was converted for office use, although some of the building's original internal details remain. These include an 18th-century rococo-style fireplace made of cast iron and surrounded in reeded wood, as well as plaster cornices and details on the upper staircase. Wingett House was named after its former 20th-century occupant Frank Wingett, who lived and operated his companies from the residence. Wingett founded and operated Wingetts Estate Agency and Auction Rooms, and the Frank Wingett Cancer Appeal. The building later housed Bridge Books.

==== No. 26 ====
No. 26 is on the western side of Chester Street, north of Chester Street's junction with Lambpit Street, forming part of a terrace and a rare 19th-century streetscape in Wrexham. It was probably built in the early 19th century, and as a house, being later converted to a shop on its lower floors, while continuing as accommodation on its upper floors. Its exterior is rendering over brick, with a slate roof, central entrance, and two storeys.

==== No. 27 ====
No. 27 is on the western side of Chester Street, north of Chester Street's junction with Lambpit Street, forming part of a terrace and a rare 19th-century streetscape in Wrexham. It was built in c. 1800 and is now used as office space. The exterior of the three-storeyed building is a rendering over brick (or painted brick), with a slate roof and its entrance to the left. Its end wall stack is shared with No. 28.

==== No. 28 ====
No. 28 is on the western side of Chester Street, north of Chester Street's junction with Lambpit Street, forming part of a terrace and a rare 19th-century streetscape in Wrexham. It was probably built in c. 1800 and as a house. Its exterior is rendering over brick, with a modern tiled roof, a right-side entrance and is of three storeys. Its end wall stack is shared with No. 27.

==== No. 29 ====
No. 29 is on the western side of Chester Street, north of Chester Street's junction with Lambpit Street, forming the end of a terrace and part of a rare 19th-century streetscape in Wrexham. It was built in c. 1830 as a house, although possibly was also initially to house office accommodation. It is now used as offices. The three-storey building's exterior is of Flemish-bond brickwork, with a slate roof and an entrance to the left. It is now an opticians.

=== No. 35 ===
No. 35 is situated as part of a terrace, on the eastern side of Chester Street, north of Chester Street's junction of Holt Street, and is a rare example of an unaltered early 19th-century (Victorian) townhouse in Wrexham. Built in c. 1840, the three-storeyed building's exterior is made of brick, while its roof is of slate. It has a rear wing, which possibly was longer in the past. The building is now used as an office, but with few of the building's original details surviving, however, the building's original plan remains. It is now a solicitors office.

=== Seven Stars ===
The Seven Stars pub building is located on the corner of Chester Street and Lambpit Street. The building dates to 1898. In 1898, the pub was rebuilt using Ruabon red brick in a commercial style, with elements of Arts and Crafts, to the designs of Liverpool architect Thomas Price, and built by Jack Scott in 1904. The building is of two storeys, while its exterior is of brick, with a slate roof, and an asymmetrical plan, while its main entrance fronts Chester Street. The building extends along Lambpit Street, to the right of the central entrance, with a semi-octagonal tower situated on the angle between Chester Street and Lambpit Street. The building housed a pub under the name Seven Stars until 2011. Following a short period of vacancy, it reopened in January 2012, as a Welsh-language community centre and pub, under the Welsh translation of its original name, as Saith Seren.

=== Feathers Hotel ===
The Feathers Hotel is a building located on the corner of Chester Street and Charles Street. The building possibly dates to c. 1630 as the Plume of Feathers, and the two-storey building was formerly a coaching inn, with remnants of the stables and coach house present behind the building. The inn was located on a popular throughfare for drovers to Wrexham's Beast Market. The building's current design mainly dates to c. 1850 – c. 1860, while the shop front dates to the late 19th century. The pub in the building closed in 2001, with the building later renovated into a clothes shop for a few years. The building is now (as of 2023) a Polish grocery store, with the converted upper floors now residential apartments.

=== Old Vaults ===
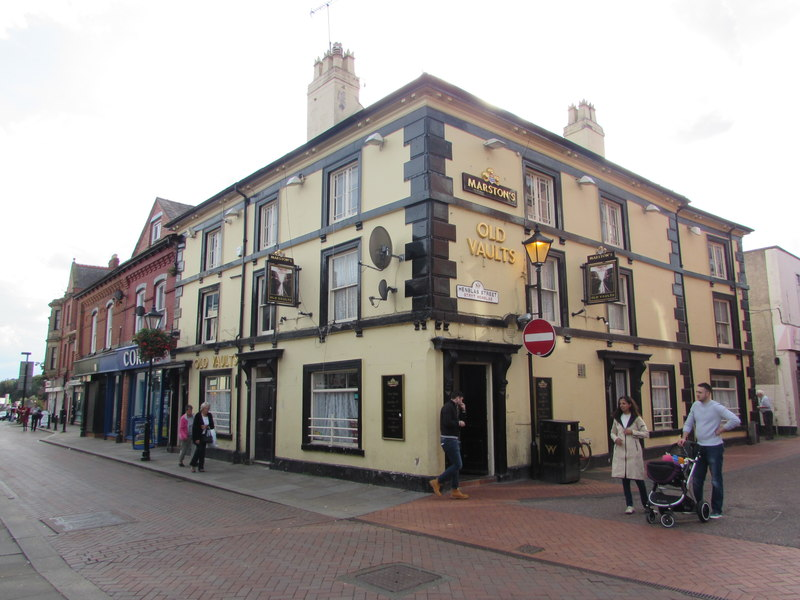
The Old Vaults

The Old Vaults pub (No. 5) is located on the corner of Chester Street and Henblas Street. It was probably purpose-built as part of a redevelopment of the site between c. 1850 – c. 1860. The three-storey building's exterior is rendering over brick, with a hipped slate roof. There is a central doorway on the side facing Chester Street, as well as another entrance further left. On the Henblas Street side, there is an entrance close to the corner between the street and Chester Street, as well as another entrance to the rear bar to the right. It was known locally as "The Long Pull", which refers to the historic practice in the pub of dispensing a longer pull on a beer pump to get larger amounts of beer which would have attracted customers from other pubs. Before the Old Vaults, a post office was located on the site by at least 1786 (possibly earlier) and up to 1814, until the post office moved to No. 36 Chester Street, and the old site becoming the Old Vaults.

=== No. 56–61 ===
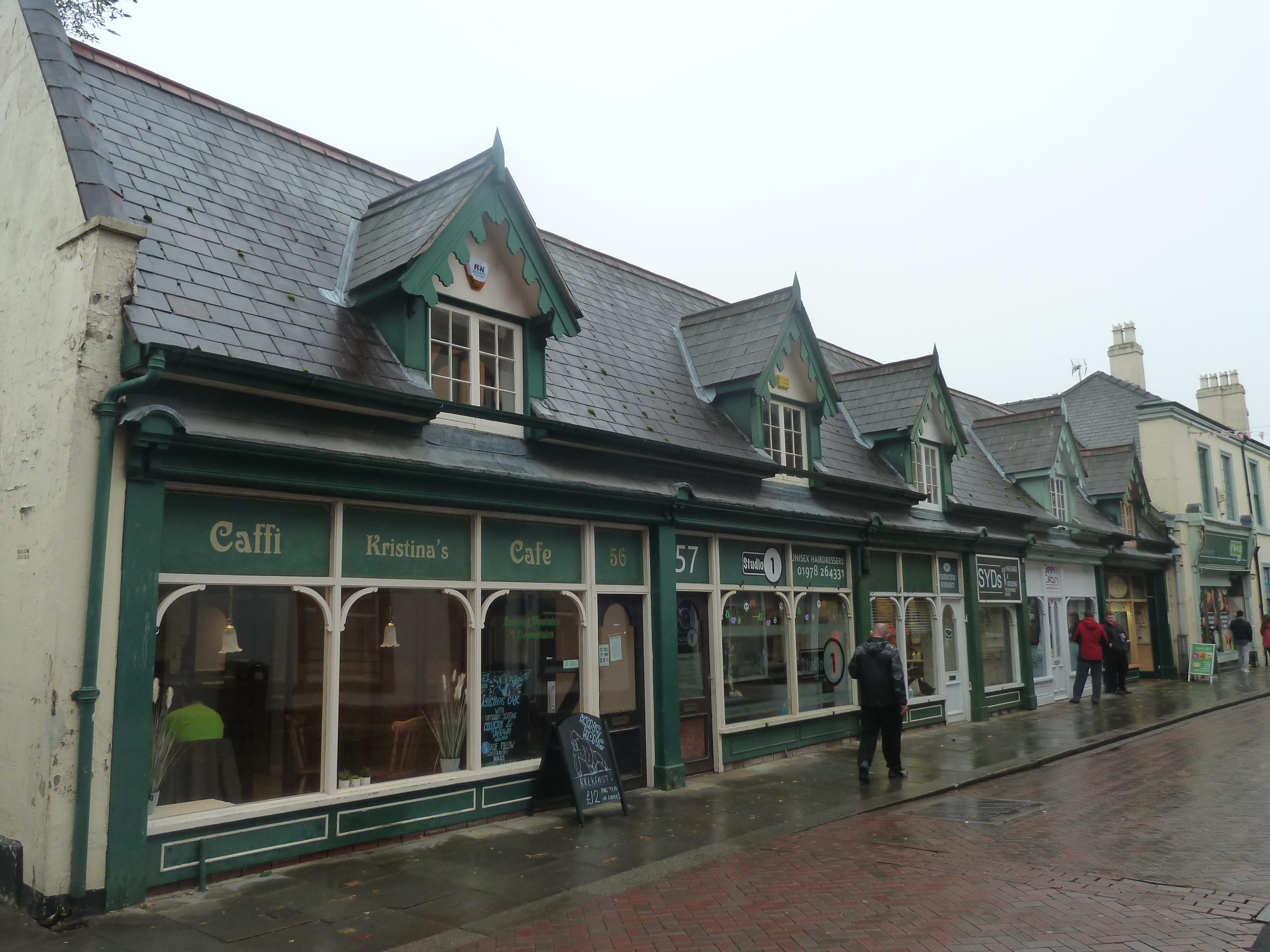
No. 56–61 row of shops, on the eastern side of the street.

On the eastern side of Chester Street, there is a row of 17th-century timber-framed shops that were originally cottages. They were modified in c. 1900 when converted into shops, and their workshops behind, dating to the 19th century. The western end of the row has c. 1900 shopfronts, while there is a passageway between No. 58 and No. 60.

== Other buildings ==
=== Tŷ Pawb (People's Market) ===
Tŷ Pawb is an arts centre, housed in Wrexham's former People's Market on Chester Street. The building was built as a People's Market in 1992 as part of a wider redevelopment of the area, and replaced the nearby Vegetable Market, which dated to 1898, and had a mock Tudor façade. It became Tŷ Pawb in 2018 and retains a Chester Street entrance. Before the market was built, the land housed Ty Meredith, possibly a townhouse of the Meredith family of Pentre Bychan.

=== Coleg Cambria ===
==== Former Groves Park Boys School buildings ====
There are former school buildings located to the north on the adjacent Chester Road. They served as buildings for a boys school known as Grove Park, with the red brick buildings facing Chester Road dating to 1902. The buildings are now part of Coleg Cambria's Yale campus.

Opposite these buildings was an area that was claimed to serve as Wrexham's first unofficial park. In the 1860s it was a plant nursery and later had a skating rink.

=== Welch Fusilier ===
On the corner of Chester Street and Holt Street is a pub known as the Welsh Fusilier, and was historically known as The Red Lion.

== History and former buildings ==
Chester Street, as well as nearby Yorke Street, historically were Wrexham's main north–south routes, located at the edge of the centre and were once very busy. It was historically referred to as Chester Lane, and together with Lambpit Street and Henblas Street formed an area known as "The Lampit/Lambpit", which some locals believe comes from a lime pit formerly located in the area.

=== Henblas Street site development ===
Bordering Chester Street to its west is what later became the Henblas Street Development. Other parts were demolished to become the Wrexham People's Market. As part of this development now sits Xplore!, formerly Techniquest (in Wrexham), in the building formerly occupied by T. J. Hughes.

It is also termed as the "bomb site" by local historians, referring to the large-scale loss of historic buildings on the site. This included Wrexham's now demolished old market, guildhall, library, fire station, some shops, pubs and cinemas. On the site's Chester Street side stood the former Wrexham Grammar School, founded in 1603 and closed in 1880, which later became home to Wrexham's first guildhall (also known as the Municipal Building) and free library in 1884 following its acquisition by the local borough council, in the year prior. The council was previously based in Brynyfynnon house. This led to the development of "Guildhall Square" which was accessed by an entrance from Chester Street. Wrexham's School of Science and Art, founded in 1893, as well as a statue of Queen Victoria, a fire station, and an 1841–1960 congregational chapel (see below) were located in this square, with the fire brigade based in an 1884 extension of the guildhall. The council used the building as a guildhall until the 1960s, when it moved to the new Guildhall on Llwyn Isaf in 1961, with the old guildhall demolished in the early 1970s. Between the old Guildhall and to the Rose and Crown (see below) there was a tall terraced row of properties, with the Bromfield Hotel being most significant building of them. The terrace was demolished in 1970.

=== Demolished buildings ===
==== Ebeneser Independent Chapel ====
There was an Ebeneser Independent Chapel located on Chester Street. It was built in 1975, replacing the original Ebeneser Chapel on Queen Street which was demolished in 1979. The Chester Street chapel was designed by Wrexham architect G Raymond Jones & Associates, costing £182,000, and consecrated on 14 January 1976. It was constructed with brown brick, and with a copper-clad roof. Small flat-headed windows were only present on the sides and rear of the building, with none being present in the chapel room or at its street elevation. Its plan formed of several interlinking wedge-shaped buildings which formed the chapel, and also housed a school room and meeting rooms.

It was demolished in 2017 and replaced with housing.

==== Rose and Crown ====
The Rose and Crown (No. 17) was a single-storey pub building on Chester Street. It dated to the early 19th century, with 17th-century timber framing which was exposed internally, an attic and sloping slate roofs. It was demolished in May 1971.

==== English Presbyterian and Congregational Chapel ====
There was an English Presbyterian chapel on Chester Street. The New Meeting Presbyterian Chapel dated to 1700, although multiple modifications and alterations were performed on the building during at least the early 19th century, although possibly earlier in the 18th century. The chapel was rebuilt in 1841, to the designs of Liverpool architect Edward Welsh, in a Classical style for its gable entry. It was demolished in c. 1960.

==== Chester Street English Baptist Church ====
There is an English Baptist church on Chester Street, the first church in Wrexham since the community established itself in the area in 1672. The original Old Meeting Baptist Chapel was built in 1762, although was rebuilt in both 1780 and 1875, with most of the existing building dating to the 1875 rebuilding, with the 1762 building demolished. The 1875-dated building was of a Simple Gothic style for its gable entry, and was designed by Wrexham architect John Morrison. In the late 20th century, a schoolroom was added. The chapel was demolished in 1987, leaving only the 20th-century schoolroom standing, which now serves as the modern-day Baptist church following its conversion in the late 1980s. A modern office block, built in 1991, now stands on the site of the former Baptist Church.

== Civic Centre ==
The Civic Centre, also partly known as Bodhyfryd (Welsh for 'pleasant place'), is adjacent to Chester Street, and aside those directly located on Chester Street, it also includes Waterworld, the Guildhall, Llwyn Isaf green, the Law Courts, Wrexham Library, and a small police station, which replaced a demolished one.

=== Crown Buildings ===
Crown Buildings
- Adeiladau’r Goron (Welsh)
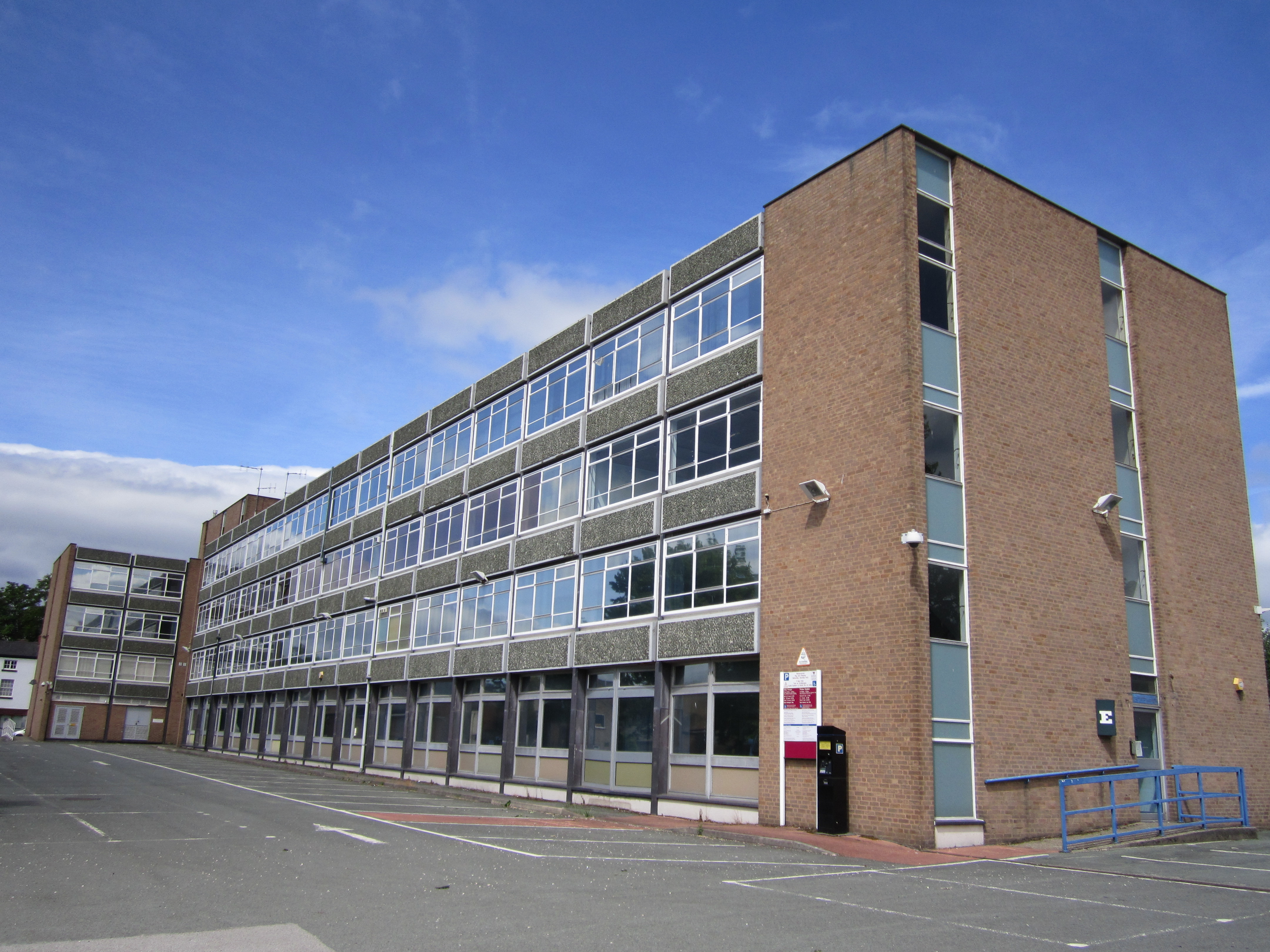
- Crown Buildings before renovation
Details
Interactive map of the Crown Buildings area
General information
Type	Municipal office Community centre (2021–)
Location	Chester Street, Wrexham, North Wales
Coordinates	53.0477°N 2.9914°W
Year built	1960s
Renovated	2021
- Owner: Wrexham County Borough Council

Technical details
- Floor count: 4

The Crown Buildings (Welsh: Adeiladau’r Goron) is a municipal building on Chester Street, in Wrexham city centre, North Wales. The building dates to the 1960s, and was refurbished in 2021, to house a community wellbeing centre, as well as improve the state of its existing council offices.

==== Description and history ====
The building was originally built in the 1960s, is four-storeys tall and served as office accommodation. It is located on the Bodhyfryd site and Chester Street. Before Crown Buildings was built, the site housed Bodhyfryd House, an "impressive" large house dating to the 1700s until it was purchased by the council in the 1930s.

In 2014, amid proposals to demolish Waterworld, it was initially proposed for Crown Buildings to be demolished too, so it can be one of the sites to be replaced by a new leisure centre that would be succeeding Waterworld. However, the Crown Buildings site was disapproved by some councillors as a site for the new leisure centre, who viewed it to "be too far for people" across the county borough to travel to. The proposed demolition was later rejected.

===== Refurbishment =====
The building, dating from the 1960s, was described to be a "high energy use building", which later was refurbished to improve efficiency as well as modernising the building. The refurbishment was initially financed for £6.7 million, but an additional £1 million added later. Assistance with funding was provided by the Welsh Government.

Following its refurbishment, the building now houses a "community wellbeing hub" on its ground floor. The hub is a partnership of the council, local group AVOW, and Betsi Cadwaladr University Health Board (BCUHB). The building started to be reoccupied from April 2022, with 625 council workers, as well as other staff from BCUHB, who initially relocated from the council building due to the building's previous deteriorating state. The first to third floors would house the council's social care, education and early intervention department. A cafe, Caffi Cyfle, later opened in the building.

=== Royal Welch Fusiliers Memorial ===
The Royal Welch Fusiliers Memorial is a war memorial located at the junction between Chester Road (a continuation of Chester Street) and Bodhyfryd. It was erected in 1924, originally at the junction between Grosvenor Road and Regent Street, in front of 1 Grosvenor Road, until it was relocated to its present site following World War II in the 1960s. The memorial was designed by sculptor William Goscombe John, and has an ashlar pedestal and flanking walls, as well as bronze figures. Its central pedestal is surmounted with figures of the Royal Welch Fusiliers in their 18th and 20th century uniforms passing each other. The pedestal also has an inscription which commemorates the World War I dead, while there are World War II inscriptions on low quadrant walls which flank the pedestal. There is a Falklands War memorial adjacent to its east.

=== Memorial Hall ===
Wrexham Memorial Hall
- Y Neuadd Goffa Wrecsam (Welsh)
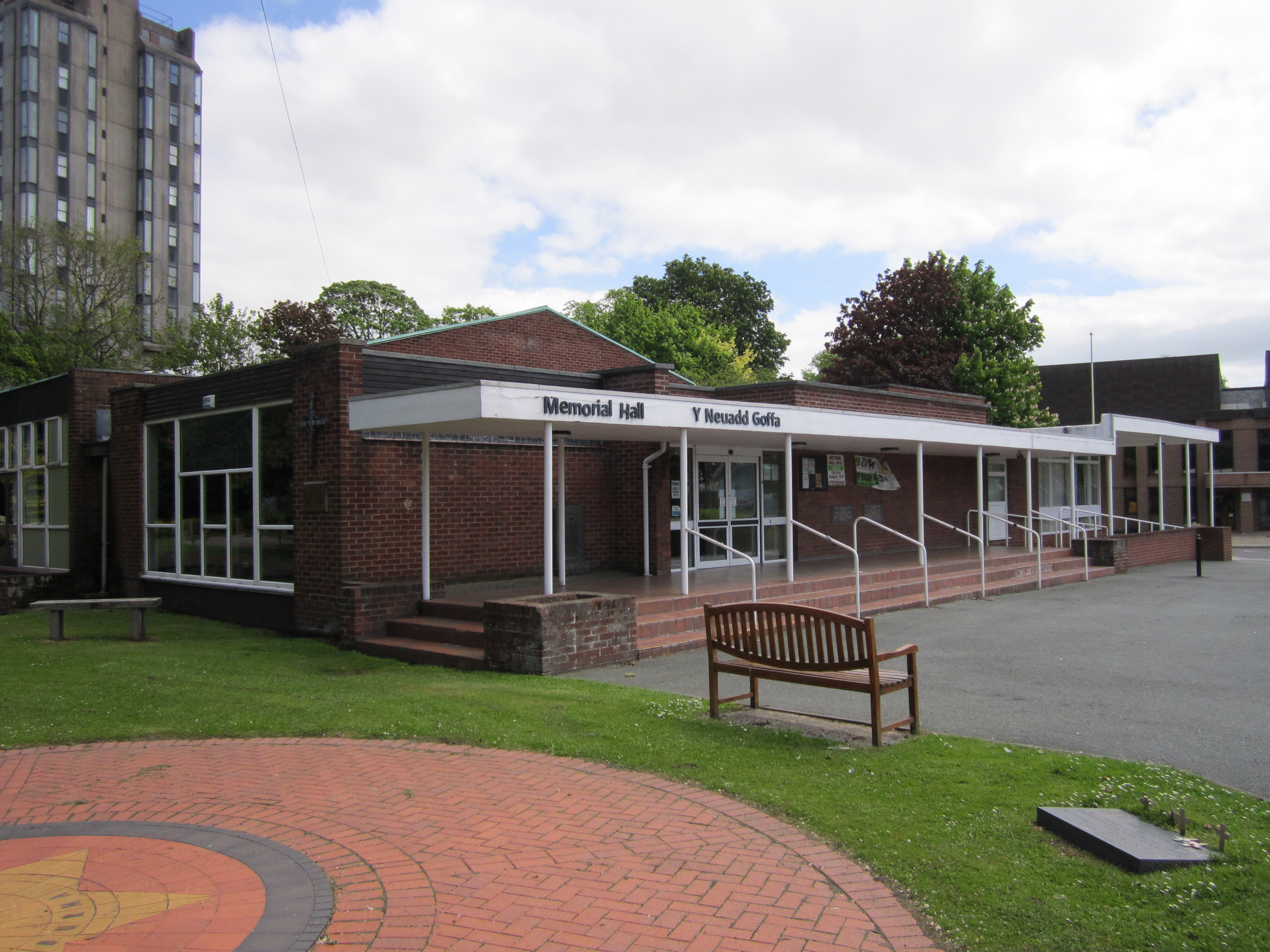
- Interactive map of the Wrexham Memorial Hall area

General information
- Type: Memorial hall
- Location: Wrexham, North Wales
Details
, The Memorial Hall, Bodhyfryd, Wrexham, LL12 7AG
Coordinates	53.0488°N 2.9904°W
Year built	1956
Cost	~£35,000 (1950s)
Owner	Wrexham County Borough Council
Website
wrexham.gov.uk/service/memorial-hall

The Memorial Hall (Welsh: Neuadd Goffa), in Wrexham, North Wales, serves as the city's memorial hall building. Located on Chester Street, as part of a grouping of civic buildings, it was built in 1956 to commemorate World War II, as well as World War I, through various plaques. Its construction was funded by both public donations and the local council, while outside it, there is another memorial and a Burma Garden. The hall is central to the city's Remembrance Day events but is proposed to be demolished and to be rebuilt since 2023.

==== Description and history ====
It is located on Chester Street, as part of a collection of civic buildings, alongside the courts and Waterworld.

It was built in 1956 as a commemoration of World War II dead. During its construction, £20,000 of its funding came from public donations, while Wrexham Borough Council contributed the remaining £15,000. It has housed several memorials and plaques, both located on and inside the hall buildings. Two plaques on its outside are made of slate, commemorating those of World War II. While there are also bronze and stone plaques inside commemorating World War I, a slate plaque for the Burma Star Association, and another memorial for council employees killed during the World Wars. On the two World War II slate plaques, 216 names are commemorated, while 383 names are on the two World War I bronze plaques. The hall's foundation stone dates to 20 March 1957, which was attended by the Mayor of Wrexham, John Albert Davies.

Outside the hall, there is a memorial commemorating David Lord, relocated from Regent Street/Grosvenor Road. Also outside the hall is the "Burma Garden", dating from 1995, commemorating the 50th anniversary of Victory over Japan Day. It depicts railway sleepers, representing prisoners of war who were forced, under harsh conditions, to construct the Burma Railway. The garden was designed by a Welsh College of Horticulture student.

The hall forms a central part in Remembrance Day events. It serves as a venue to host multiple events, such as conferences, seminars, fairs, cultural events, and wedding parties. For conferences, it can accommodate between 20 and 300 people, and be sub-divided into three units, or for parties divided into a separate dining area.

In 2009, a catering exhibition was held at the hall.

In 2023, the council announced they were considering whether to replace the existing memorial hall with a new building. This follows a reduction in activity at the hall during and after the COVID-19 pandemic in Wales, which reduced the hall's incoming finances. It is hoped a new building will make the hall better compete with other more modern venues. A new building is the council's "preferred option". Responses from some residents were mixed, some preferring the existing venue be updated, while others welcomed the idea of a new build whether as still a memorial hall or made into a different venue. Plans for the estimated £11 million redevelopment, include creating a memorial garden, piazza, and a remembrance plaza, surrounding a new building.
