= Grosvenor Road, Wrexham =

Road in Wrexham, Wales

Grosvenor Road
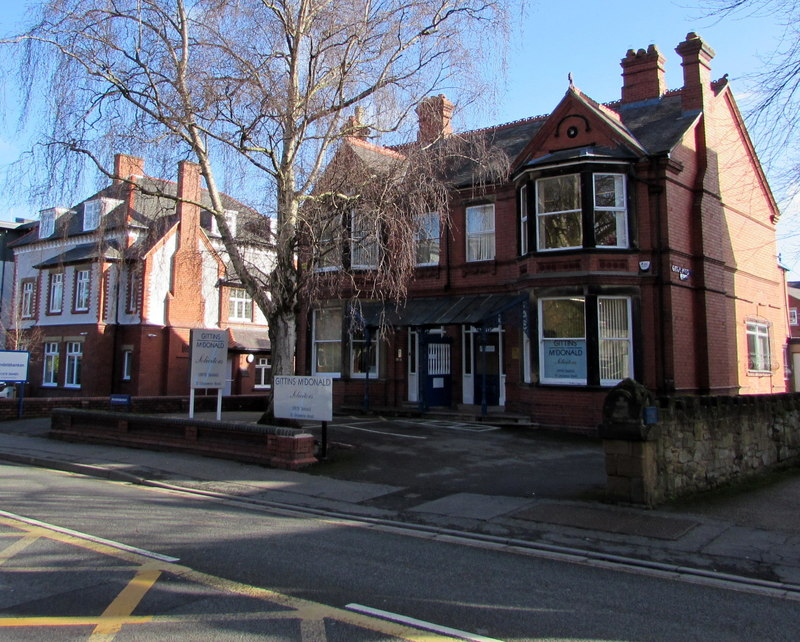
- Offices on the road.
- Interactive map of Grosvenor Road
- Native name: Ffordd Grosvenor (Welsh)
- Part of: Wrexham city centre
- Namesake: Grosvenor family
- Location: Wrexham, Wales
- Coordinates: 53.049138°N 2.996775°W

Grosvenor Road (Welsh: Ffordd Grosvenor) is a road and conservation area in Wrexham city centre, North Wales. The conservation area spans the road itself and adjacent streets, particularly all of Grove Road.

== Conservation area ==
The Grosvenor Road Conservation Area (Welsh: Ardal Gadwraeth Ffordd Grosvenor) is a conservation area that covers all of Grosvenor Road, all of Grove Road, and parts of Gerald Street, Grove Park Road, King Street, Regent Street, Rhosddu Road and part of the campus of the former Yale College (now part of Coleg Cambria).

The conservation area was first designated in September 1990, and in 2009 a character assessment and management plan was made.

== Description and history ==
Grosvenor Road was originally a path known as "Rope Walk". It was set out between 1861 and 1881 along the lines of the path and through the open land of the "Oak Tree Field". It is named after the Grosvenor family, later the Dukes of Westminster, residing in Eaton Hall near Chester. Grosvenor Road was part of a prestigious residential area catered to the growing middle class of Wrexham. The road itself was originally a private road, with gates at each end, although no evidence of the gates have survived. The first building built on the road was possibly Brynhyfryd (No. 2), with Grosvenor Lodge being the second-built. By 1881, most of the road was developed, and by 1951 most of the street's buildings were used as offices, with a remaining few residences. Of its buildings, the most notable are its Italianate villas.

=== Listed buildings ===
==== Grosvenor Lodge ====
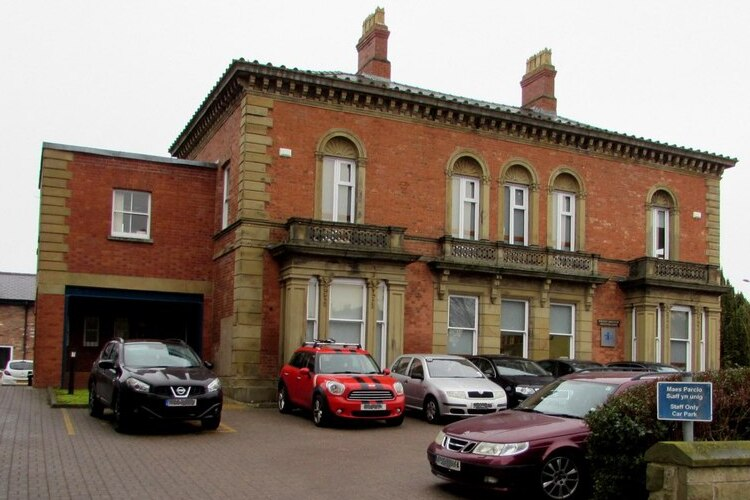
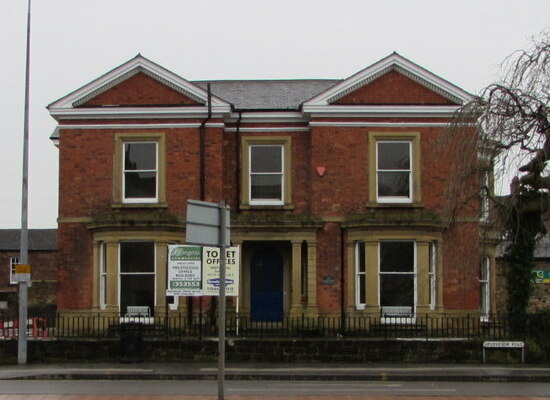
No. 1 (left) and No. 2 Grosvenor Road (right)

No. 1, originally Grosvenor Lodge, was built in 1869 by J.R. Gummow and is in an Italianate villa style, self-described as "Anglo-Italian". Constructed as initially a private residence, it was purchased by Wrexham council in 1924, becoming an office, and then a medical clinic up until the 1990s, being renovated in 2001. Its exterior is made of brick, with a slate roof and is two storeys high.

Until 1959, the Royal Welch Fusiliers War Memorial stood outside No. 1 until its relocation to Chester Street.

==== No. 2 ====
No. 2, originally Brynhyfryd, was built in 1868, and was the first house built on Grosvenor Road. Its style is of a simplified Italianate villa style. The building served as Wrexham's register office, an Assistance Board Area Office, and a private residence. It is located on the corner of Regent Street and Grosvenor Road, near Wrexham Cathedral. It was possibly designed by J.R. Gummow, a local architect. Its exterior is made of brick, with some ashlar dressings. It has a slate roof and is two storeys. The building's entrance is located at its centre and fronts Grosvenor Road.

==== No. 26 and 28 ====
No. 26 and No. 28 were built between 1869 and 1872 as a pair of houses in a villa design, with one of them now used as offices. Its exterior is of Flemish bond brickwork and has a slate roof. Both houses are identical to each other, resembling their composition as a pair, however they are not symmetrical. They are two-storeys with a six-window range.

==== Abbotsfield ====
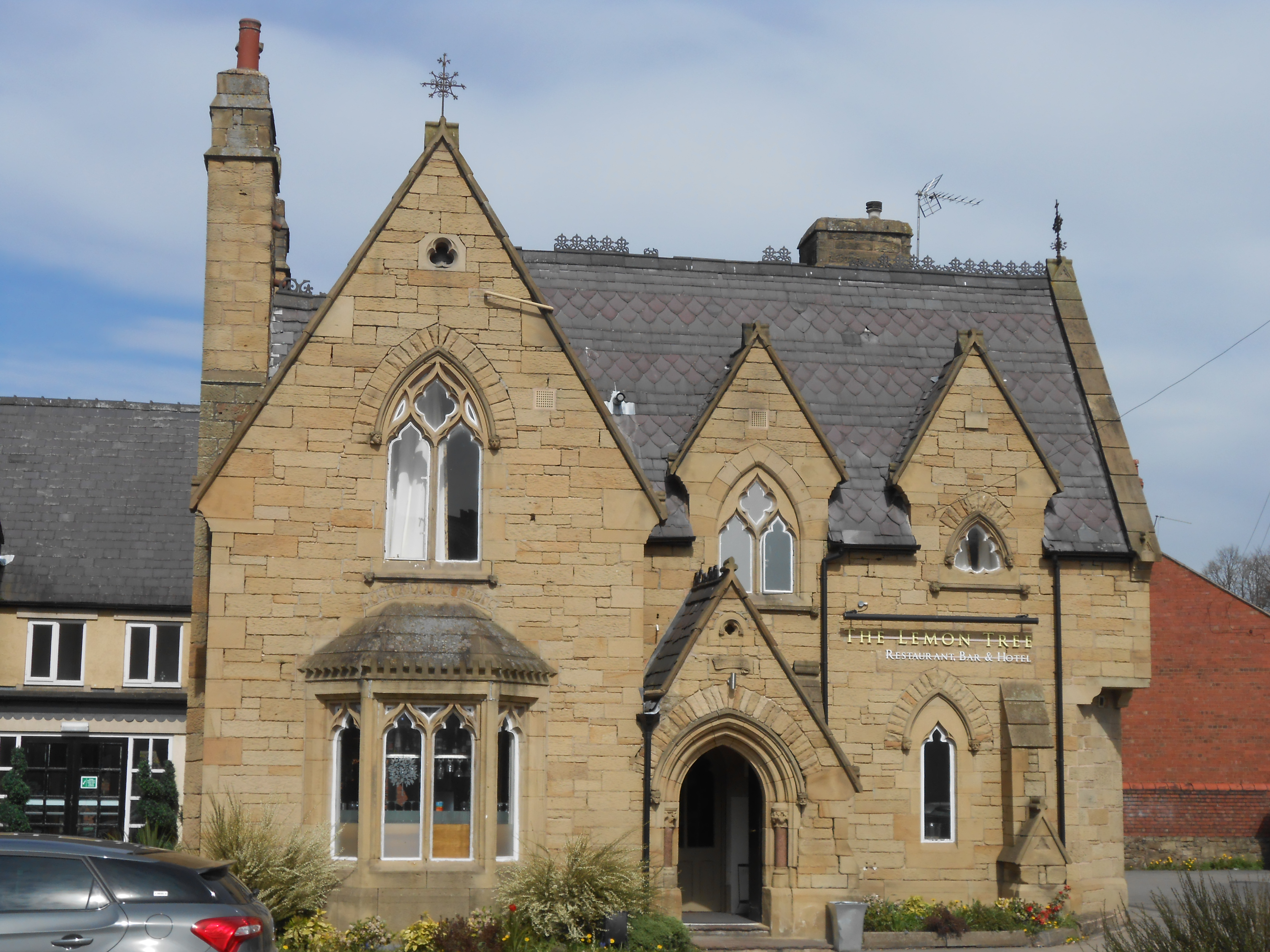
Abbotsfield, now used as The Lemon Tree hotel.

Abbotsfield was designed in the 1860s by local architect James Reynolds Gummow as a private residence. It was constructed and built from 1863 to 1865, and was the first house built on the Rhosddu end of Grosvenor Road. It later became an Area Education Office for the Denbighshire and later Clwyd council. It served as the Abbotsfield Priory War Nursery during the World Wars. The council later sold building in the 1970s to become a hotel in 1982, then a hotel and a bar in the 1970s to the 1990s. In 2000 it became an Italian restaurant, then its now modern use as "The Lemon Tree" restaurant, bar and hotel. The building is located on the corner of Grosvenor Road and Rhosddu Road, It is two storeys, grade II listed, and in the neo-Gothic style. Its exterior is of coursed and squared tooled sandstone, with the roof being made of slate. The building is arranged as a L-plan with its entrance located at the centre.

=== Other buildings ===
No. 13 is "Kelso House", and where it once was a school. Its name "Kelso House" is carved into one of its gate pillars.

==== Wrexham Islamic Cultural Centre ====
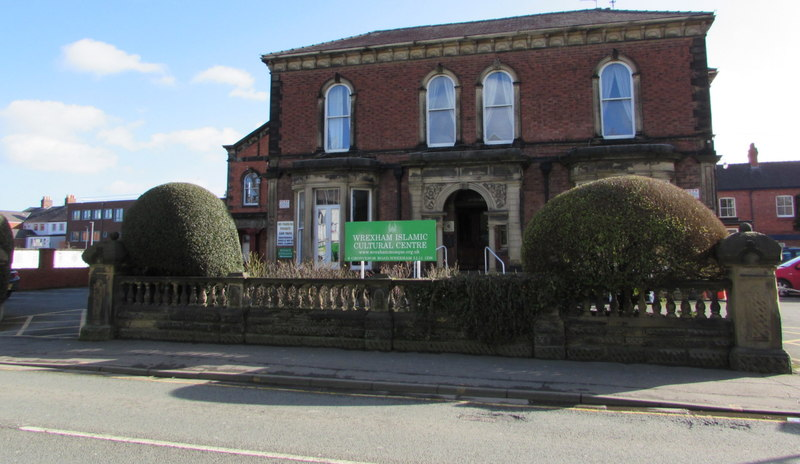
The Wrexham Islamic Cultural Centre.

The building opened in 1923 as the "North Wales Mine Workers Institute", with its opening funded largely by the subscription fees of miners that are members of the institute, as well as revenue from the events that were held in the building. Following the Gresford disaster, the building assisted in the Relief Fund following the disaster. During the 1984–1985 United Kingdom miners' strike, in October 1984, Bersham Colliery workers held a meeting in the building, described to have been "very divisive". The institute closed in 2008.

In 2010, the building was purchased by the Wrexham Muslim Association. Under their ownership the building has been converted into a mosque, a place of worship for local Muslims, offering educational, religious and cultural services.

=== Historical buildings ===
On the site where Nos. 15 and 17 stand was historically the site of a school on Grosvenor Road, known as the "Convent", a Roman Catholic secondary school, later replaced by St Joseph's Catholic and Anglican High School. The site now houses government offices at Nos. 15 and 17.
