= The Fellowship of the Ring (disambiguation) =

The Fellowship of the Ring (1954) is the first volume of The Lord of the Rings (1954–1955) by J. R. R. Tolkien.

The Fellowship of the Ring may also refer to:

- The Company of the Ring, also called the Fellowship of the Ring, the group of characters the book is named for
- The Lord of the Rings: The Fellowship of the Ring, a 2001 film directed by Peter Jackson
  - The Lord of the Rings: The Fellowship of the Ring (soundtrack), soundtrack of the film
- The Lord of the Rings: The Fellowship of the Ring (video game), a 2002 video game based on the book, but not on the film
- The Fellowship of the Ring: A Software Adventure or Lord of the Rings: Game One, a 1985 computer game
- The Fellowship of the Ring (board game), a 1983 game from Iron Crown Enterprises

== See also ==
- "The Return of the Fellowship of the Ring to the Two Towers", a 2002 episode of South Park
