= Trinity Presbyterian Church, Wrexham =

Presbyterian church in Wrexham, Wales

Trinity Presbyterian Church
- Trinity English Presbyterian Church; Trinity Presbyterian Church of Wales
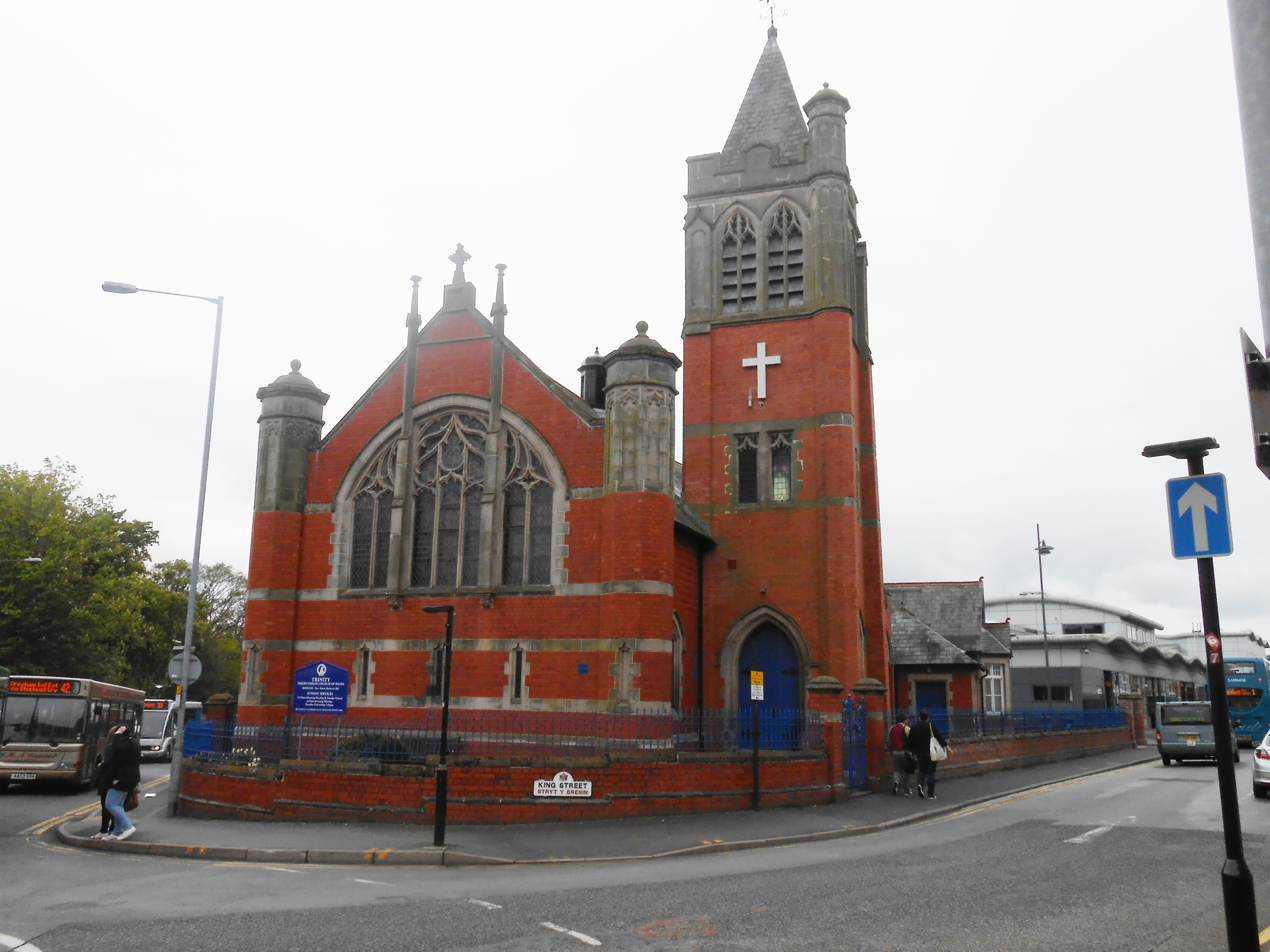
- The church viewed from Rhosddu Road, with King Street and the bus station to the right.
- Trinity Presbyterian Church
- 53.048628°N 2.995201°W
- Location: Wrexham, North Wales
- Address: King Street, Wrexham, LL11 1SE
- Country: Wales
- Denomination: Presbyterian Church of Wales
- Website: trinitywrexham.org.uk

Architecture
- Style: Perpendicular Gothic
- Completed: 1908

Listed Building – Grade II
- Official name: Trinity Presbyterian Church of Wales
- Designated: 31 January 1994
- Reference no.: 1848

The Trinity Presbyterian Church is a presbyterian church in Wrexham, North Wales, part of the Presbyterian Church of Wales' Wrexham Mission Area. The church building was built and opened in 1908 to the Perpendicular Gothic designs of William Beddoe Rees. It is a Grade II listed building and has a tower. Its exterior is made of red brick, terracotta dressings and yellow sandstone.

== Congregation ==
The church is an English-speaking congregation of the Presbyterian Church of Wales, as is part of the church's Wrexham Presbyterian Mission Area which included other Presbyterian churches around Wrexham.

Public worship and a Sunday school are held on Sundays in the church, with various meeting held on other days of the week.

As of July 2023, the minister is David Jones, and the secretary is Gwenda Fletcher.

== Structure ==
The building on the junction of King Street and Rhosddu Road (adjacent to the bus station), was built in 1907–08 and officially opened in 1908, although the church congregation existed before the building. The church was built for the English Calvinistic Methodists as a replacement for their Hill Street premises, which is now the Grove Park Theatre. When it was built it housed a schoolroom. The schoolroom was occupied by late 1907, when the first service occurred. The building was designed by William Beddoe Rees from Cardiff, and is a Grade II listed building.

The building (including its chapel) is made of Ruabon red brick with stone dressings and a slate roof with terracotta crestings, and some additional yellow sandstone. It is of the Perpendicular Gothic architectural style, although also described to contain elements of the Arts and Crafts movement, with a long-wall entry plan and contains a tower. The entrance to the church is located at the base of the tower, with the tower forming a fourth bay on the west side. The tower is brick at its bottom, while becoming stone at the bell-chamber stage, and topped with a pyramidal spirelet. All windows on the building are simple stained glass with art nouveau motifs.

The church's hall is at a right angle to the church at the south-west corner of the site. There are further rooms in the asymmetrical rear wings of the building, either side of the hall range.

The site of the building is bounded by a brick wall with stone copings, gate piers, and cast-iron gates.

== See also ==
- List of churches in Wrexham County Borough
