= The Talbot, Wrexham =

Former pub and hotel in Wrexham, Wales

Talbot Inn
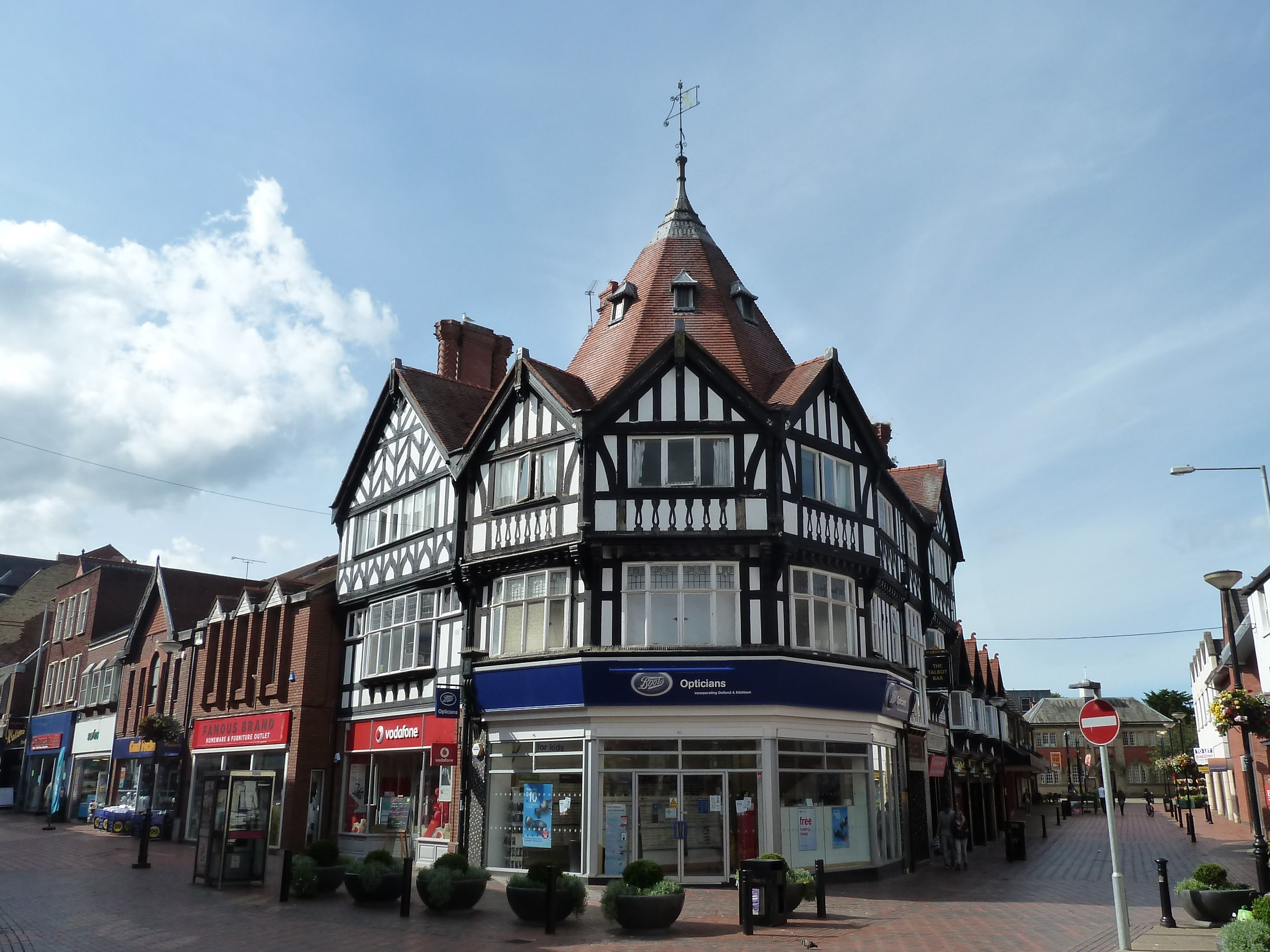
- The polygonal corner of the building between Hope Street (left) and Queen Street (right)
- Former names: Talbot Inn (–1900s); The Talbot Bar (2008)
- Alternative names: Talbot Hotel; The Talbot; Talbot Pub; Talbot Public House

General information
- Type: Pub (–1966); Hotel (1905–1966); Retail space (1966–); Bar and music venue (2008)
- Architectural style: Neo-Tudor
- Location: Wrexham, Wales
- Address: 48–49 Hope Street and 1–3 Queen Street, Wrexham
- Coordinates: 53.045988°N 2.993738°W
- Renovated: 1904–05

Height
- Roof: Red plain tiled and finialed overhanging tiled

Technical details
- Floor count: 3

Renovating team
- Architect(s): John H. Davies and Son of Chester; M. J. Gummow (also credited)

Listed Building – Grade II
- Official name: The Talbot Public House
- Designated: 31 January 1994
- Reference no.: 1844 and 16504

The Talbot is a former pub and hotel in Wrexham city centre, North Wales. It was built and opened by 1905 replacing an older inn also known as The Talbot or the Talbot Inn.

The current building consists of a polygonal Tudor Revival façade structure and is situated in between Wrexham's Hope Street and Queen Street, with the building also extending further across Queen Street. A hotel styled as the Talbot Hotel also operated on the first floor of the building.

It stopped operating as a pub and hotel in 1966, later being converted into retail space (now Boots Opticians), although part of the building briefly served as a bar known as The Talbot in 2008.

== Description ==
It is a three-storeyed polygonal corner building with outer gables facing and situated between Hope Street and Queen Street, with it extending as a lower two-storeyed four-gabled range along Queen Street. It has half-timbered walling with a polygonal red plain tiled roof and has a Tudor Revival façade, and is one of the few built and later remaining Tudor-faced buildings in Wrexham with other similar-designed buildings later demolished.

It is a grade II listed building. The building was designed by John H. Davies and Son of Chester, although M. J. Gummow who designed the Poyser Street drill hall, is also accredited with designing plans for the building. The end wall stacks are made with enriched brickwork, using a standard type designed by Douglas and Fordham for production by Ruabon-based J. C. Edwards.

The building is said to be one of the most photographed buildings of Wrexham, and is used to promote Wrexham such as by local politicians, as a local landmark.

== History ==
In March 1888, the older inn was acquired by F. W. Soames & Co for £4250 (equivalent to £597,991 in 2023) and the old pub was demolished. The older pub was also known as "The Talbot" or the "Talbot Inn" in older photographs.

By August 1904, an agreement was signed between Rev. John Ollerhead and J. W. Soames on a larger rebuilding of the hotel. The building was rebuilt in 1904–05, into a larger building than the original and became a hotel on the first and second floor with an extra shop on the ground floor. Mr Soames of Soames Brewery (later Border Breweries) held some yearly events for his employees in the building.

The Talbot Inn Hotel stayed open until 1966 and is now retail space, recently being occupied as of 2019 by Boots Opticians. Although the name The Talbot was retained by a bar located in the building's basement, which briefly openly operated as a bar and music venue between 2008 and 2009.

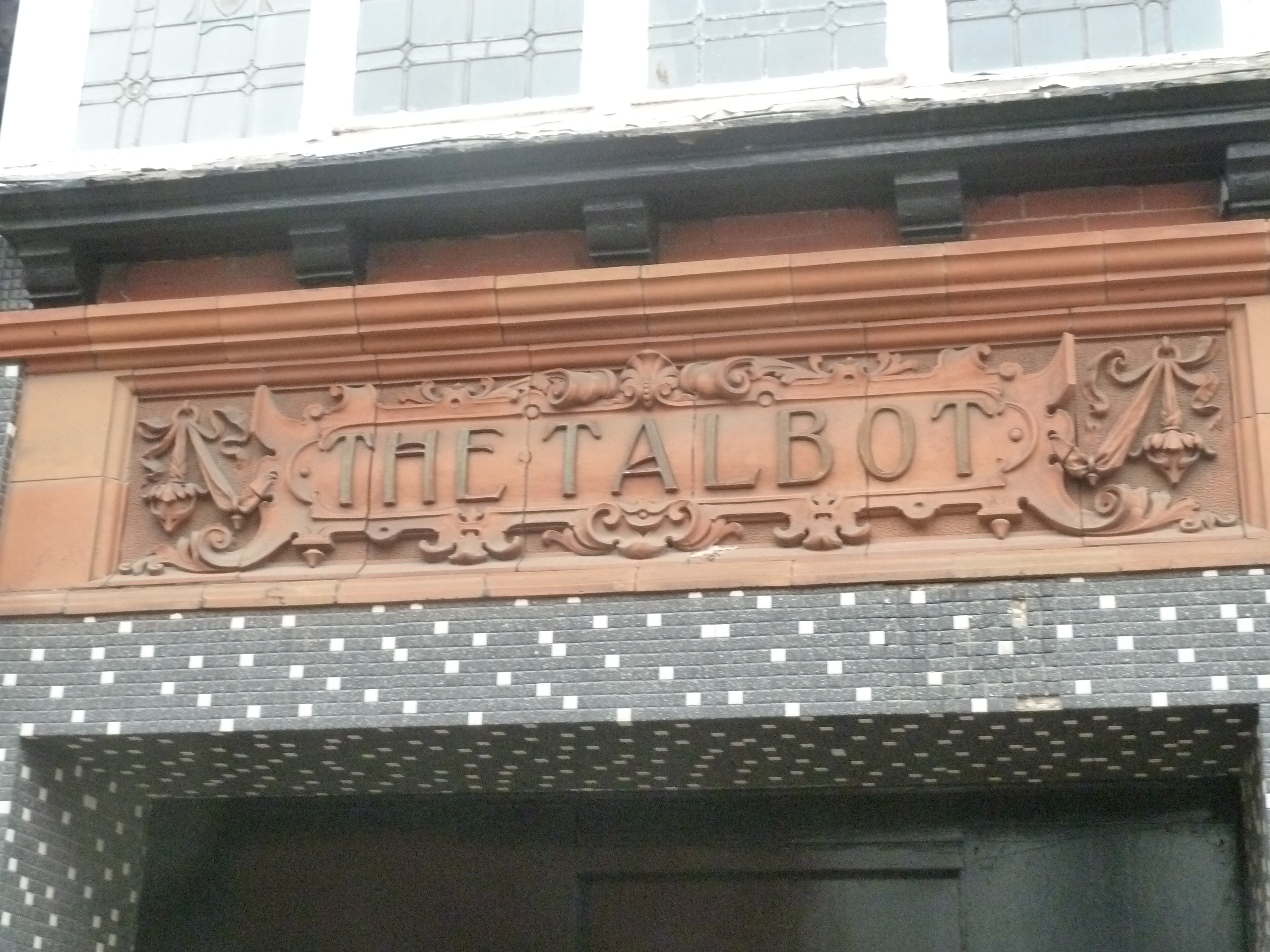
Terracotta panel above the Queen Street entrance
