= Rhosddu =

Community in Wrexham County Borough, Wales

Rhosddu: Welsh: Rhos-ddu
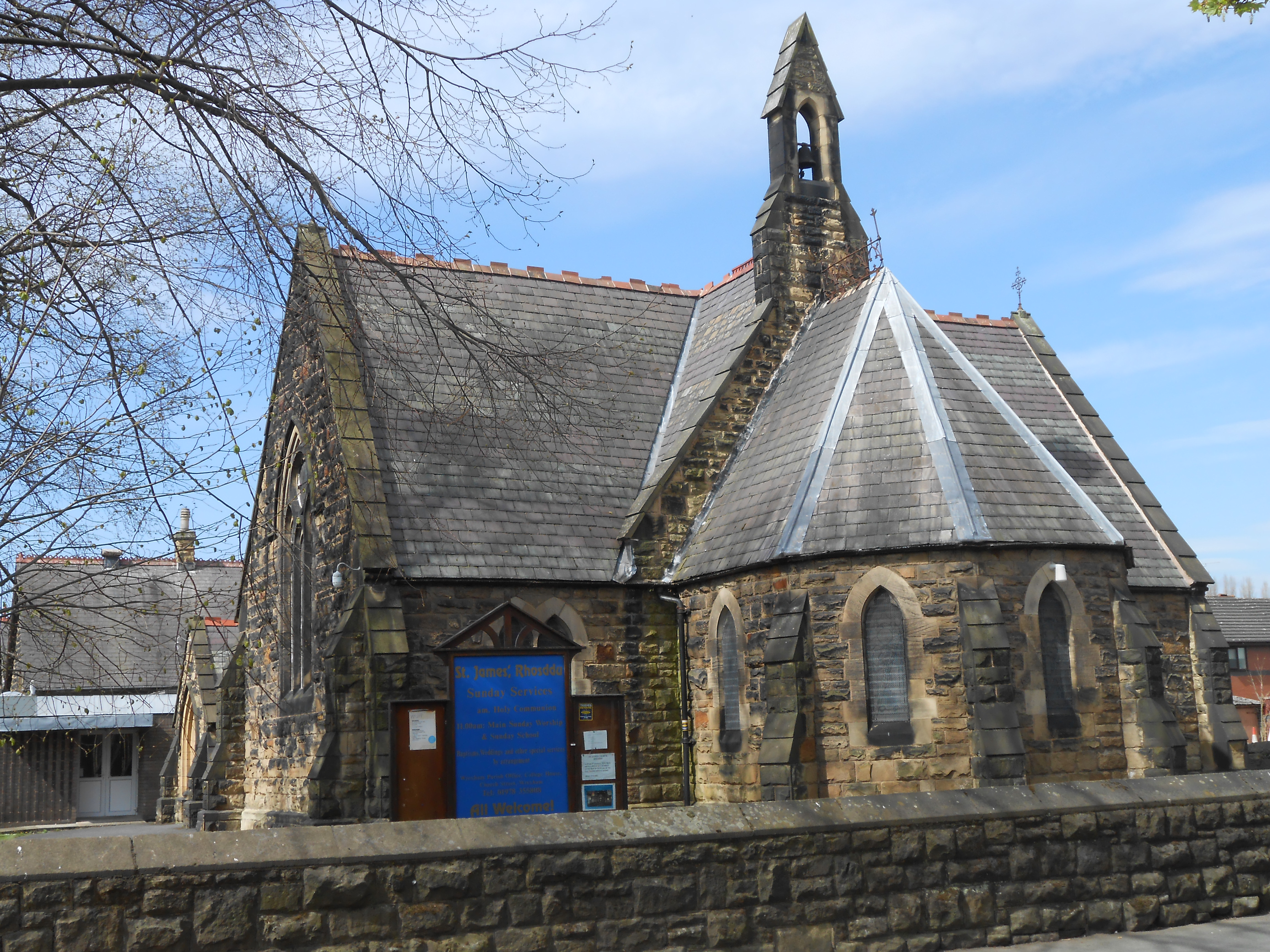
- St James' church in Rhosddu

- Location within Wrexham
- Population: 6,840 (2011 Census)
- OS grid reference: SJ 33290 51092
- Principal area: Wrexham
- Preserved county: Clwyd
- Country: Wales
- Sovereign state: United Kingdom
- Post town: WREXHAM
- Postcode district: LL11, LL12, LL13
- Dialling code: 01978
- Police: North Wales
- Fire: North Wales
- Ambulance: Welsh
- UK Parliament: Wrexham
- Senedd Cymru – Welsh Parliament: Wrexham
- List of places UK Wales Wrexham 53°03′09″N 2°59′47″W Map of the community

Rhosddu (Welsh: Rhos-ddu; Welsh pronunciation) is a suburb and community in Wrexham County Borough, Wales, covering the north-western parts of the city of Wrexham and comprises the wards of Grosvenor, Garden Village and Stansty.

At the 2011 Census, the population of the community was 6,840 and 11.8% of people aged 3+ spoke Welsh.

== Administration ==
Rhosddu was formed as a new ecclesiastical parish by an Order in Council in 1886. The parish contained the townships of Acton, Bieston and Gourton (from the parish of Wrexham), the township of Borras Riffri (from the parish of Gresford), and the township of Stansty (from the parish of Gwersyllt). In 1972, Rhosddu reverted to the parish of Wrexham.

Rhosddu was in the civil parish of Stansty until 1935, when it was absorbed into the municipal borough of Wrexham. The borough was abolished in 1974, under the terms of the Local Government Act 1972. A community called Rhosddu was subsequently created in 1985 as one of four communities of Wrexham Maelor within the area of the pre-1974 borough of Wrexham (Rhosddu, Offa, Caia Park, and Acton).

== History ==
The name Rhosddu is formed on the Welsh words rhos, "moor" or "rush pasture", and ddu, "black". The name may derive from the presence of coal and peat below the poorly drained surface as evidenced by old field names in the neighbouring Stansty area which indicate similar features e.g. 'Tirodd Duon' (black lands). It is likely that the area was common land in medieval times used by tenants of the manor as rough pasture for cattle grazing. Rhosddu Farm (also known as Walnut Tree Farm) was first recorded in 1762 in the possession of the Griffiths family and was located on the site of the Walnut Tree public house on New Road.

The first housing developments in the Rhosddu area began from 1856 following the arrival of the railway and the location of associated goods and carriage sheds in the area. The population increased further as a result of the Wrexham and Acton Colliery which opened in the late 1860s.

St James' church was built in Cefn sandstone to designs by W. Turner of Wrexham. The foundation was laid on 30 September 1874 and it was opened for worship in January 1876, although it was not consecrated until 27 April 1886. The church is now a Grade II Listed building, being considered a good example of a late 19th-century church retaining many original features.

Rhosddu School (originally known as Stansty Park Board School) opened in 1877 and moved into its current premises on Price's Lane in 1915.

Grosvenor Road Conservation Area is situated to the north west of the commercial city centre and incorporates Grosvenor Road, Grove Road and parts of Gerald Street, Regent Street, King Street, Grove Park Road, Rhosddu Road and part of the Coleg Cambria Campus.

== Dissenters' Burying Ground ==
The Dissenters' Burying Ground on Rhosddu Road was originally a field of about one acre on land given to the Wrexham Nonconformists during the early 1600s by the Puritan Daniel Lloyd of Pen y Bryn Farm. The graveyard was probably laid out during the 1650s during the Interregnum period. By the mid-18th century, the graveyard was being used and maintained by the Baptist Church and, in 1788, an ongoing ownership dispute of the Ground was resolved allowing Presbyterians to be buried there upon payment of a fee to the Baptist Church. Hay was grown and sold to pay for a grave digger and other expenses. During the night of the Wrexham races, in the mid-1840s, all but one of the brass memorial plates were stolen from the tombs, thus destroying many family histories. The last burial took place in 1901. When the Ground was closed to new burials in 1888, it contained 27 family vaults, a number of brick graves and 920 private family earthen graves. The graveyard was later landscaped and is now a public park.

Many notable people are buried here including the great Puritan Morgan Llwyd (d.1659) and the ironmaster William Wilkinson (d.1808). Margaret Lloyd George unveiled a memorial to Morgan Llwyd in 1912.

== Residents ==
John Godfrey Parry-Thomas, the engineer and motor-racing driver, was the son of the curate of Rhosddu and lived in the area during his childhood.

== Sports ==
Wrexham A.F.C. played their home games in the 1881–82 and 1882–83 seasons at Rhosddu Recreation Ground (changing the club's name to Wrexham Athletic for one season), before moving back to the Racecourse Ground for the 1883–84 season, where they have remained.

== Gallery ==
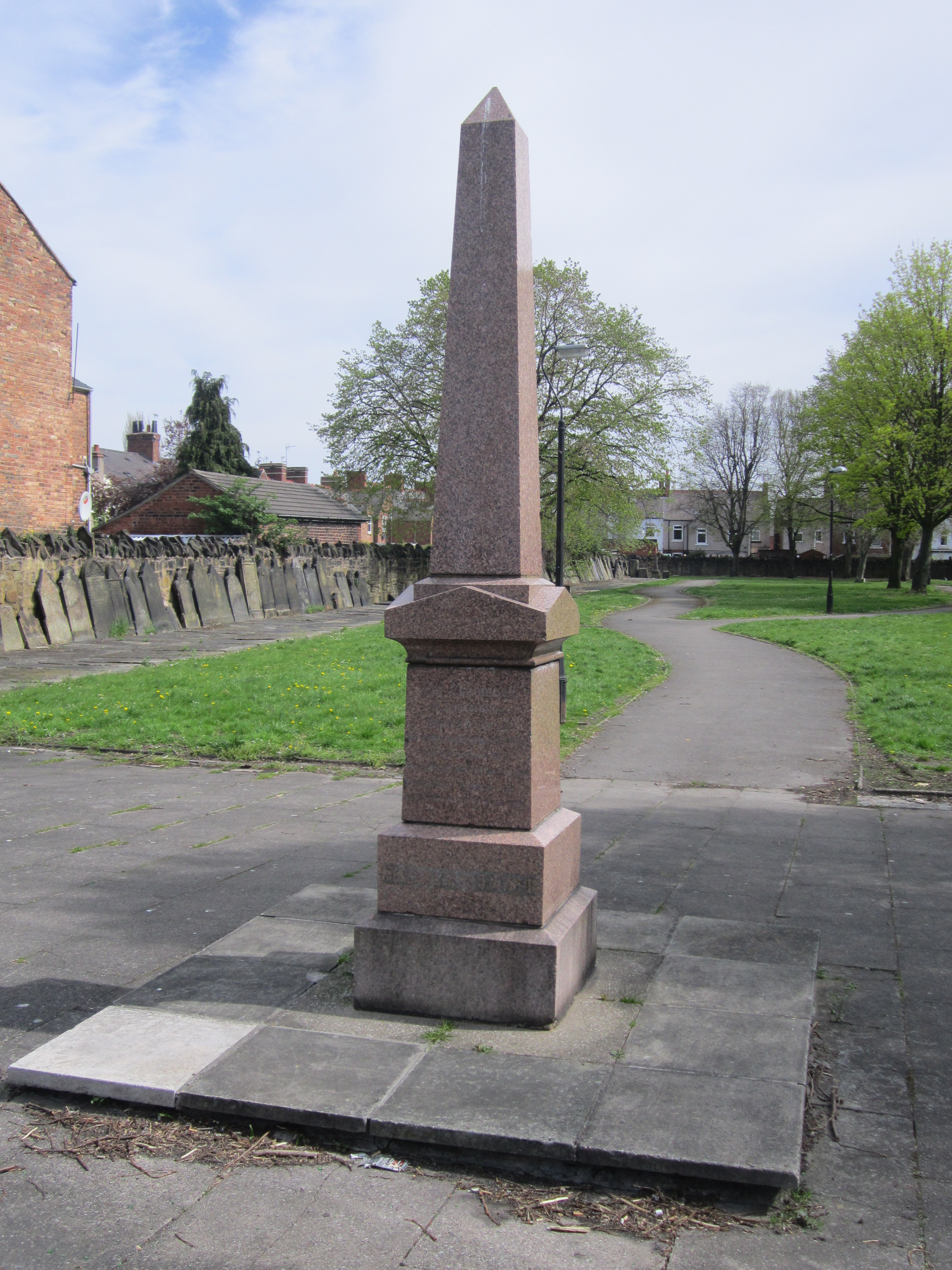
Morgan Llwyd Memorial, Dissenters' Burial Ground

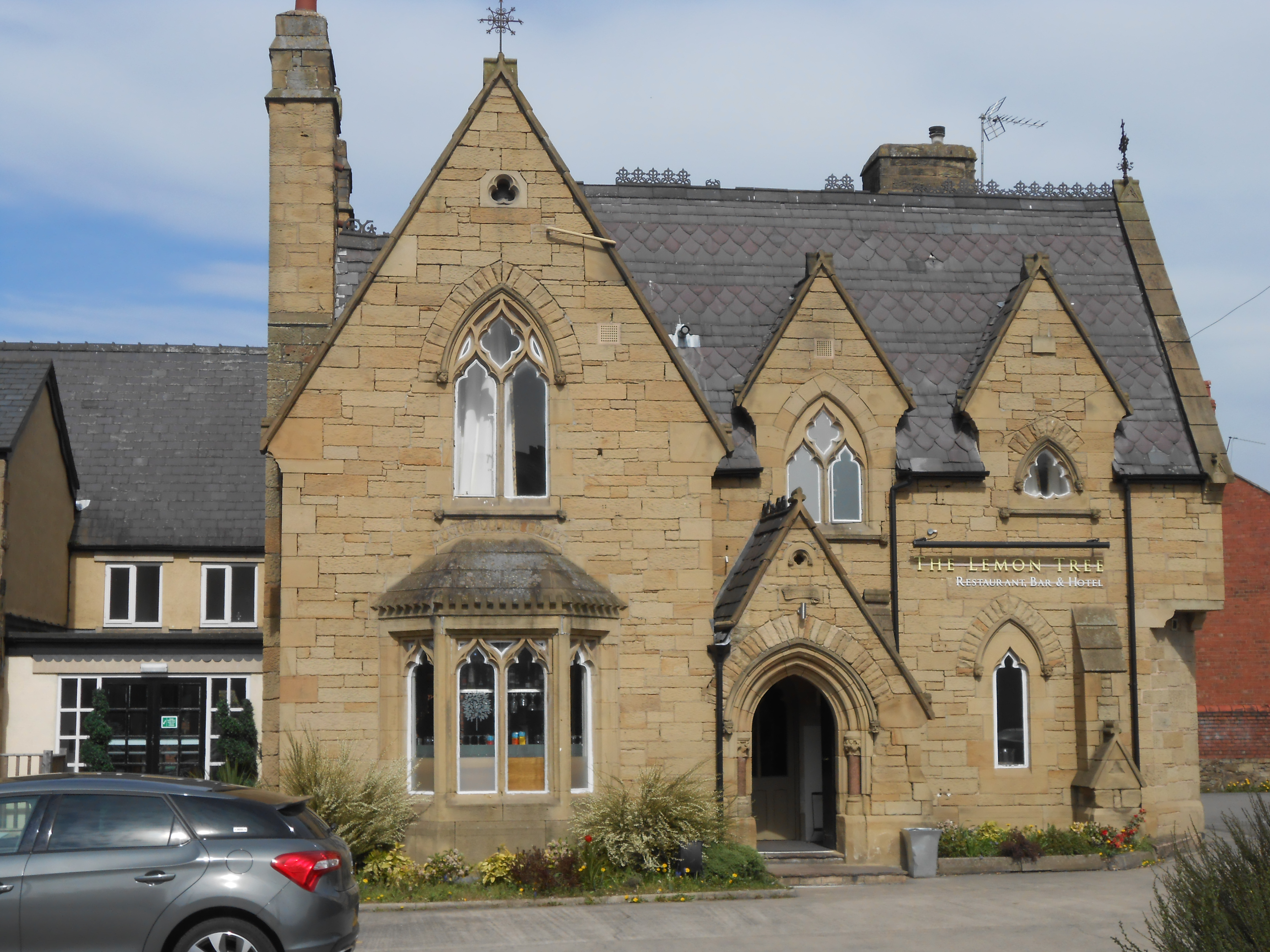
Abbotsfield, Wrexham

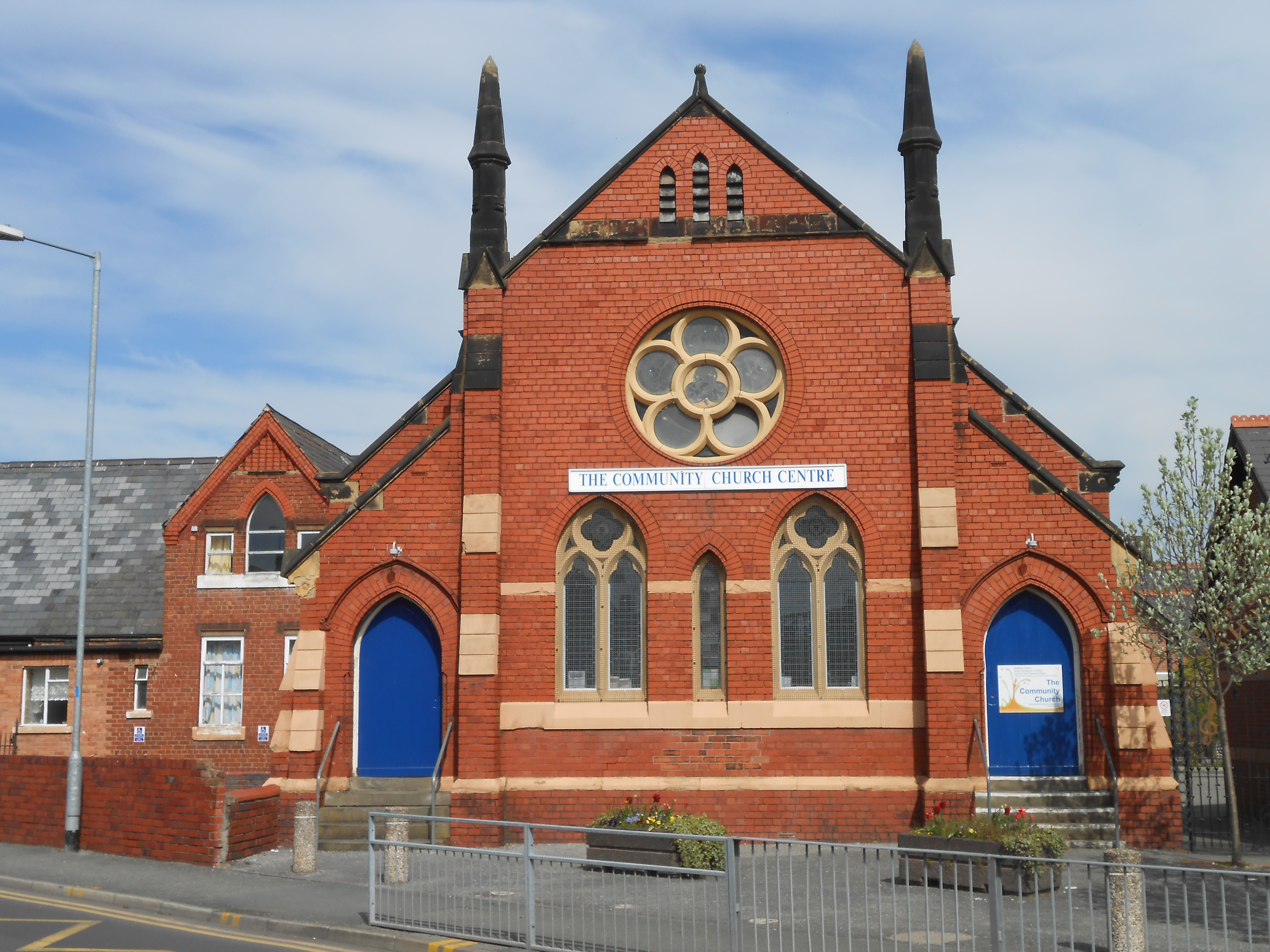
The Community Church, Prices Lane (previously 'Price's Lane Ebeneser Welsh Presbyterian Chapel'), built 1873

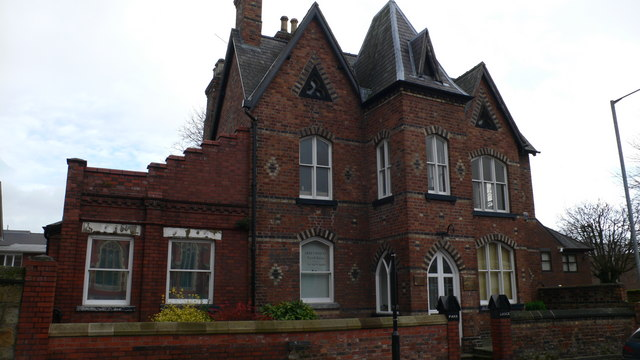
Park Lodge, an example of the neo-gothic style prevalent amongst houses along Rhosddu Road
