= Roofing slates =

Roofing tiles made out of slate

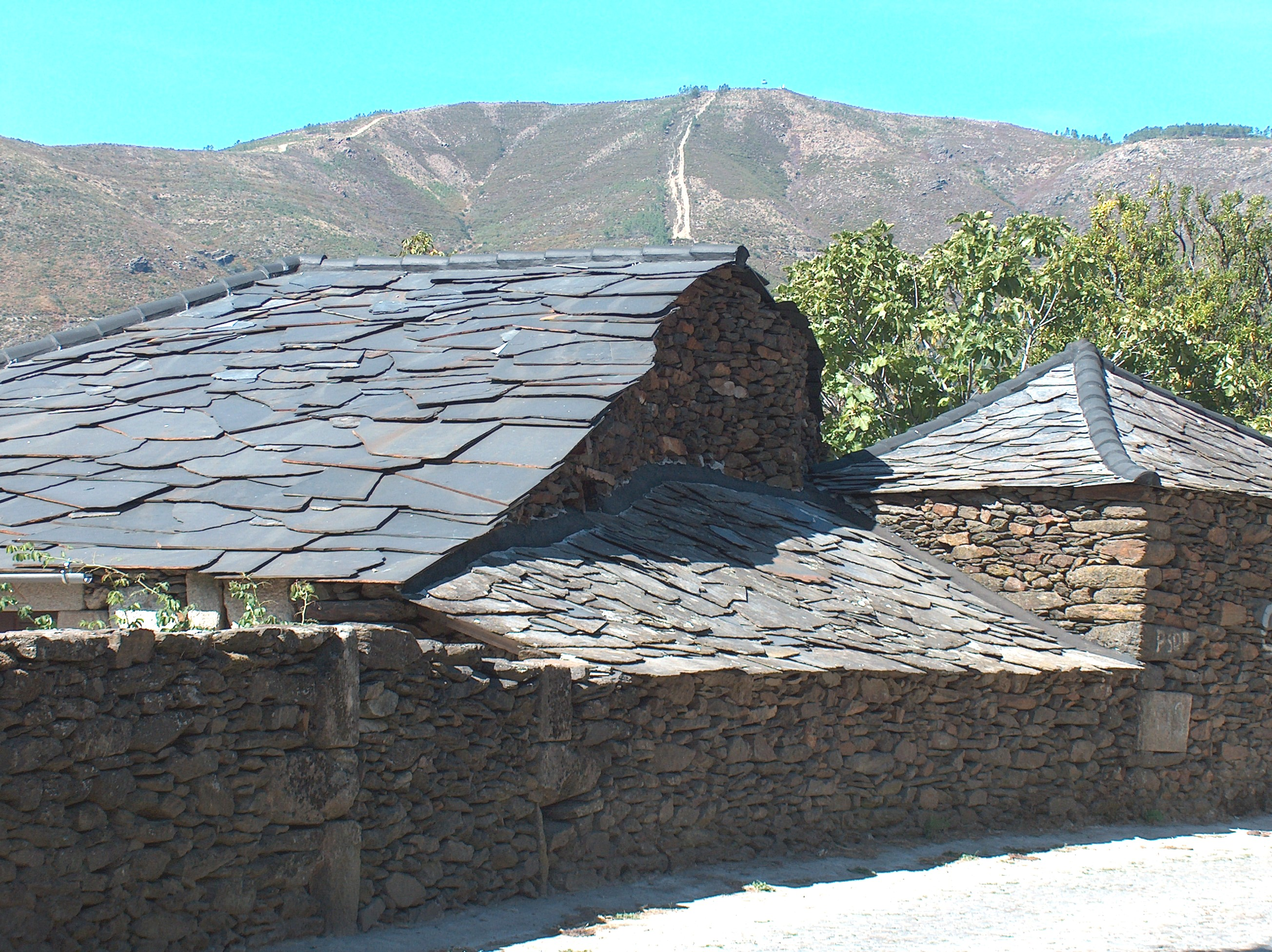
Roofing slates

Roofing slates are roofing tiles made out of slate. The rock is split into thin sheets which are cut to the required size before shipment. This contrasts to slabs which are milled to produce larger structural components. They are the primary product of the slate industry.

== History ==
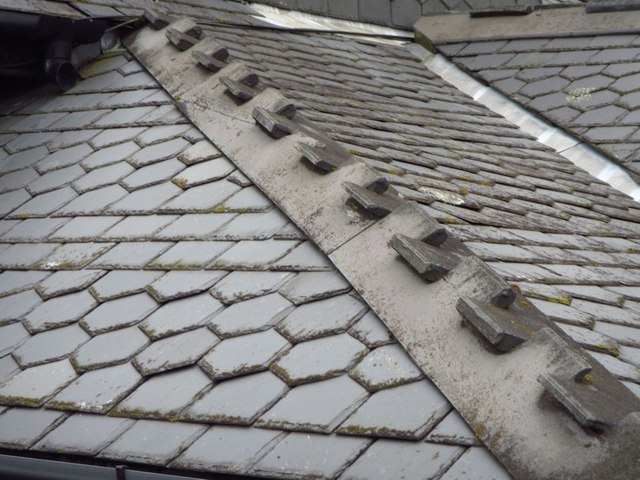
Example of the interlocking slate ridging patented by Moses Kellow and produced at Parc (this example is on the former toll house at Porthmadog, which became the offices for the Croesor quarry)

The Romans were the first to mine and install standard-sized slate on roofs.

In his writings, Pliny the Elder mentions the existence of slate in Liguria, near Genoa.

== Modern production ==
The world's biggest consumer of slate is France, followed by the UK, USA and Germany.

In 2012, Spain produced more than 580,000 tonnes (570,000 long tons; 640,000 short tons) of slate worth about $380 million. This made it the largest slate producer in the world, followed by China and Brazil.

== See also ==
- Stone slabs § In construction
- Roofing material
- List of commercially available roofing materials
- Slate industry in Wales (has information about different sizes of roofing slates)
- North Wales Quarrymen's Union
- Slate industry in Spain
