= Henblas Street, Wrexham =

Street in Wrexham, Wales

Henblas Street
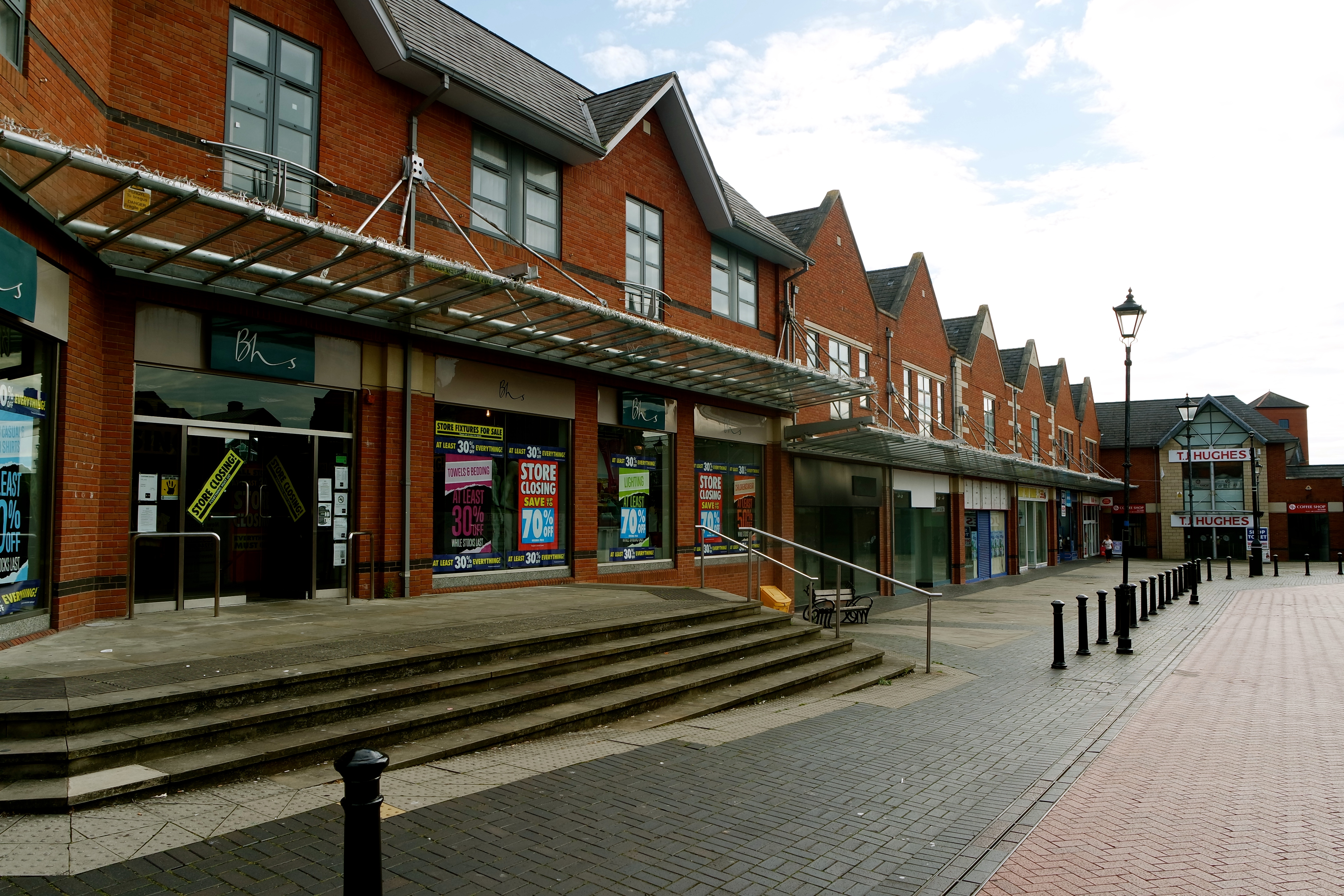
- Looking down Henblas Square along the street from Queen Street
- Interactive map of Henblas Street
- Native name: Stryt Henblas (Welsh)
- Former name: Old Hall Street
- Part of: Wrexham city centre
- Location: Wrexham, Wales
- Coordinates: 53.046117°N 2.992941°W

Other
- Status: Pedestrianised

Henblas Street (Welsh: Stryt Henblas) is a street in Wrexham city centre, North Wales, which runs along Henblas Square, a retail complex and pedestrianised square at its centre.

The retail development was constructed in the 1990s, replacing Wrexham's former Vegetable Market built in 1879 (opened as "Market Square"), which in turn replaced Birmingham Square (later housing Birmingham Hall), a market square in the 1800s for traders from Birmingham. The modern development also replaced Guildhall Square (along a former Guildhall Street), which contained Wrexham's old Guildhall, schools and fire station. The demolition of various historic buildings and markets on the site has given it the nickname "the bomb site".

Further down Henblas Street lies the General Market, which also replaced a market square known as Manchester Square (later housing Manchester Hall). While also along the street was the Hippodrome, which replaced the Union Hall (or Public Hall), with the site proposed for a Ryan Rodney Reynolds Memorial Park since 2023. The Butchers' Market also lies at the end of the street.

Since the 2010s, the modern retail development has suffered with dereliction with vacant units. Regeneration efforts have been underway, such as the opening of Xplore! science centre on the site, and residential units. Wrexham council hopes for the site to become part of a "market quarter".

== History ==
Before the construction of the modern complex in the 1990s, the site was home to old markets and various other historic buildings until they were demolished. This formed a "large hole" in the centre of Wrexham, and locally became known as "the bomb site". Henblas Street is pedestrianised.

=== 19th century ===
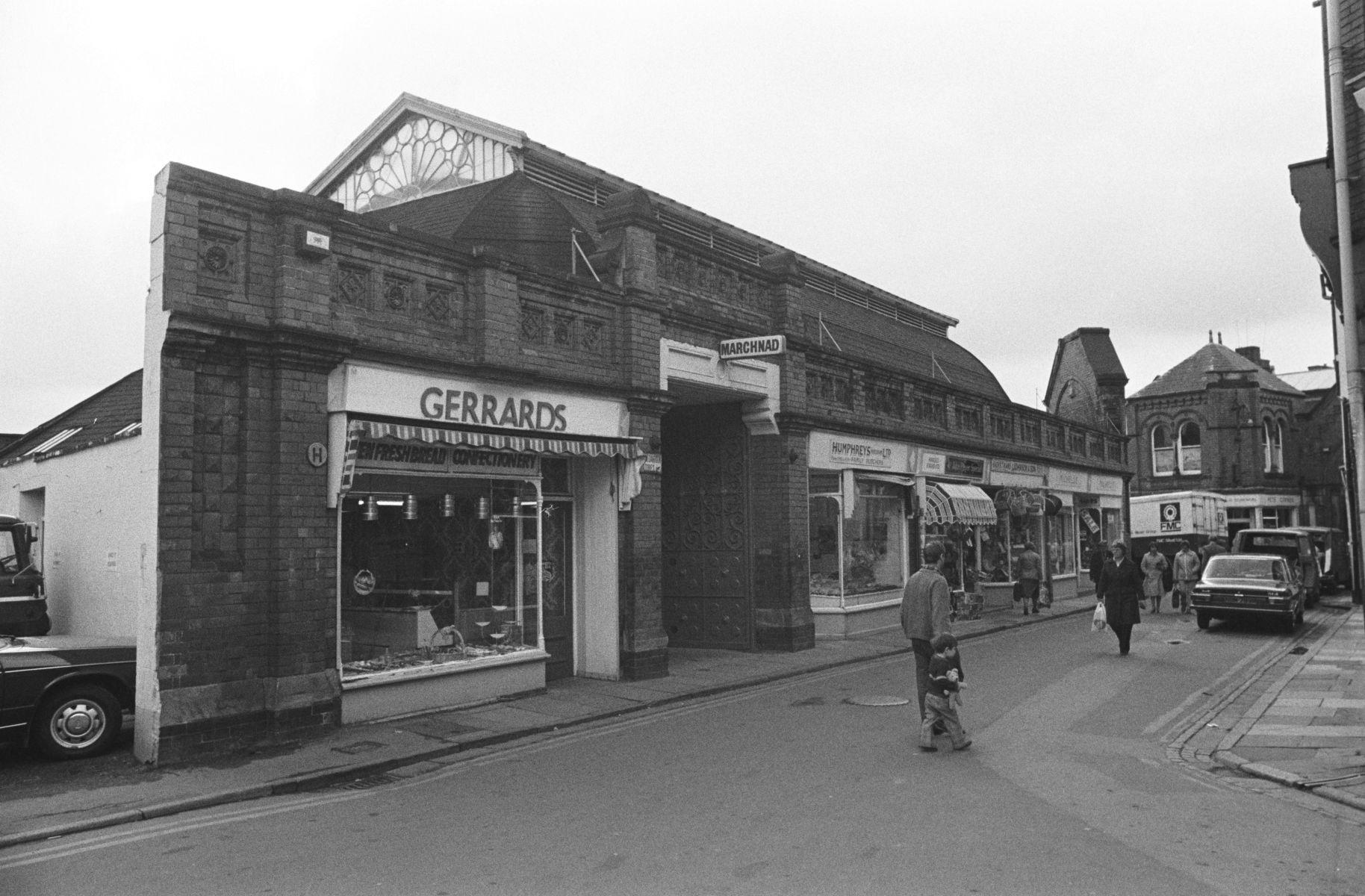
The General Market building in 1982 along Henblas Street, and was the site of the former Manchester Square

In an 1872 atlas, the area included an older Queen's Square, a congregational chapel, a Potato Market, Birmingham Hall, a grammar school, Wrexham's first fire station, Union Hall, and some toilets. The original Queen Square, located on the site, was a market square surrounded by two-storey buildings, similar to the Chester Rows, with both ground floor and first floor units. Yorkshire traders from the nearby Yorkshire Square (near St Giles' Church) moved to Queen Square for its more central location. Between Henblas Street and Lambpit Street stood "Birmingham Square" (later replaced with Birmingham Hall), where traders from Birmingham in the 1800s came to Wrexham annually for the town's March fair to sell hardware. While on the site where the General Market now stands, was "Manchester Hall", for traders from Manchester to sell linen, cotton and other fancy goods from the city.

On the site's Chester Street side stood the former Wrexham Grammar School, founded in 1603 and closed in 1880, which later became home to Wrexham's first guildhall (also known as the Municipal Building) and the free library in 1884 following its acquisition by the local borough council. The council was previously based in Brynyfynnon house. This led to the development of "Guildhall Square" which was accessed by an entrance from Chester Street. Wrexham's School of Science and Art, founded in 1893, as well as a statue of Queen Victoria (donated by Henry Price, a student of the school in 1905 for the coronation of King Edward VII), a Music Hall (later offices of the Wrexham Advertiser), a fire station, and a 1841–1960 congregational chapel were also located in this square, with the fire brigade based in an 1884 extension of the guildhall. The council used the former grammar school building as a guildhall until the 1960s, when it moved to the new Guildhall on Llwyn Isaf in 1961, with the old guildhall demolished in the early 1970s. The statue, which was housed in front of the old Guildhall, was later moved to Bellevue Park in 1928/1929, to provide needed parking spaces for buses and for a site to host a Thursday market for fruit and vegetables. The congregation chapel, which stood alongside Guildhall Square, opened in 1841 at a construction cost of £2,611, and it was demolished in 1960.

Henblas Street was previously known as "Old Hall Street", while "Kenrick Street" was the name of the street nearby. There was also a "Guildhall Street" (previously also known as "Bottle Street") which went past the old Guildhall and grammar school. But following the narrowing of Henblas Street and the construction of what later became TJ Hughes, it and Kenrick Street disappeared. Although Guildhall Street reappeared in an error on Apple Maps in 2012, and a following the closure of TJ Hughes in 2011, the public cut-through the building, between Chester Street and Henblas Street along the path of the former street was closed, but later re-opened following the opening of Xplore! in the building.

=== Vegetable Market ===
==== Opening as Market Square ====
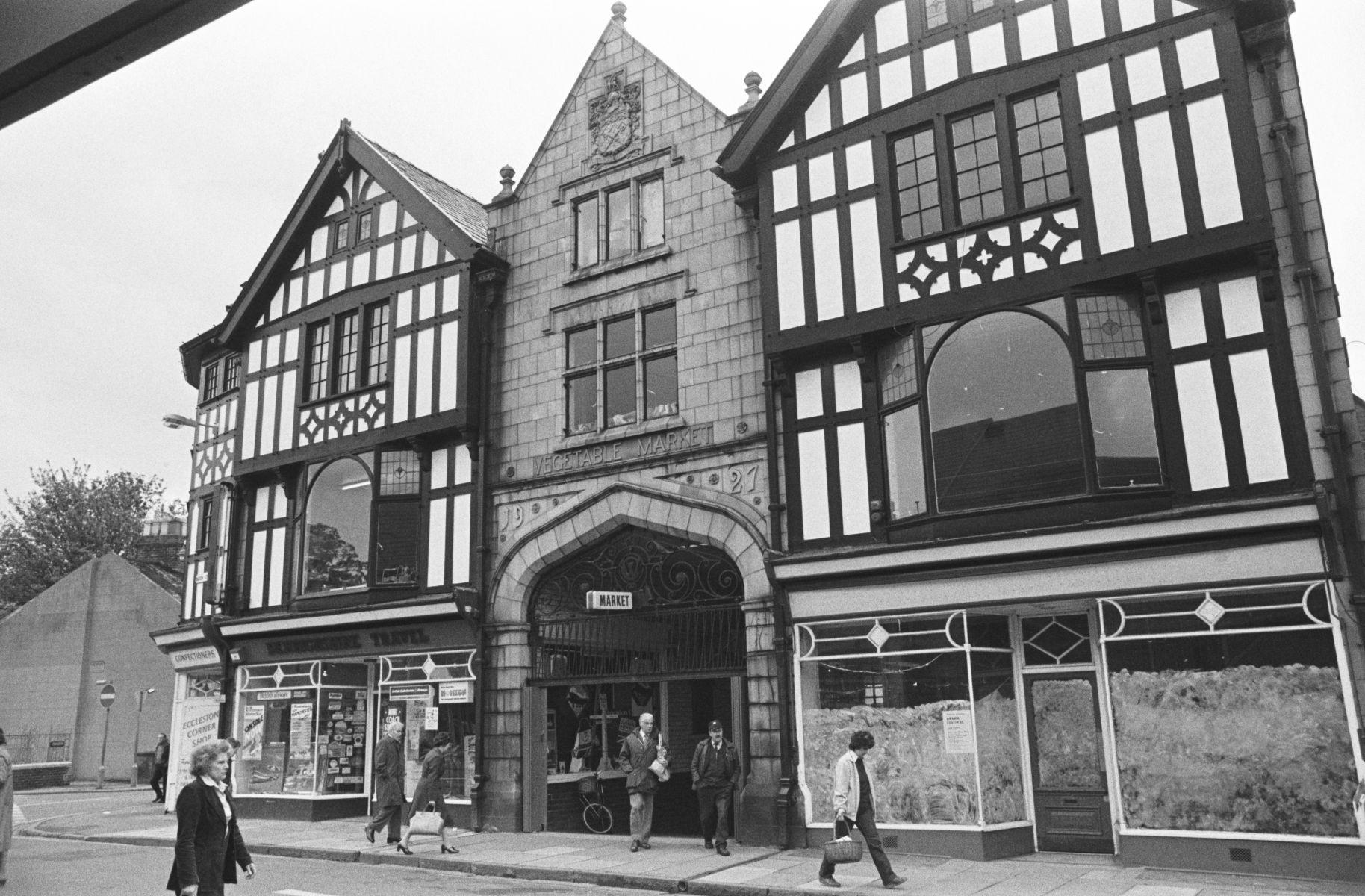
The Queen's Street entrance to the Vegetable Market in 1982, with part of its mock Tudor frontage.

In the 1870s, the site underwent development into a market by the Market Hall Company and was first called "Market Square" upon opening in 1879. The development replaced the older Queen's Square and Birmingham Hall, which housed the traders from Birmingham Square which was sold in c. 1820. Nearby the Union Square on the other side of Henblas Street was roofed and converted to Union Hall.In 1898, the borough council bought the Market Square site, between Henblas Street and Queen Street, leading to the area being extended and roofed. The building's side along Queen Street and either side of the entrance was given a mock Tudor frontage, and it was renamed the "Vegetable Market".

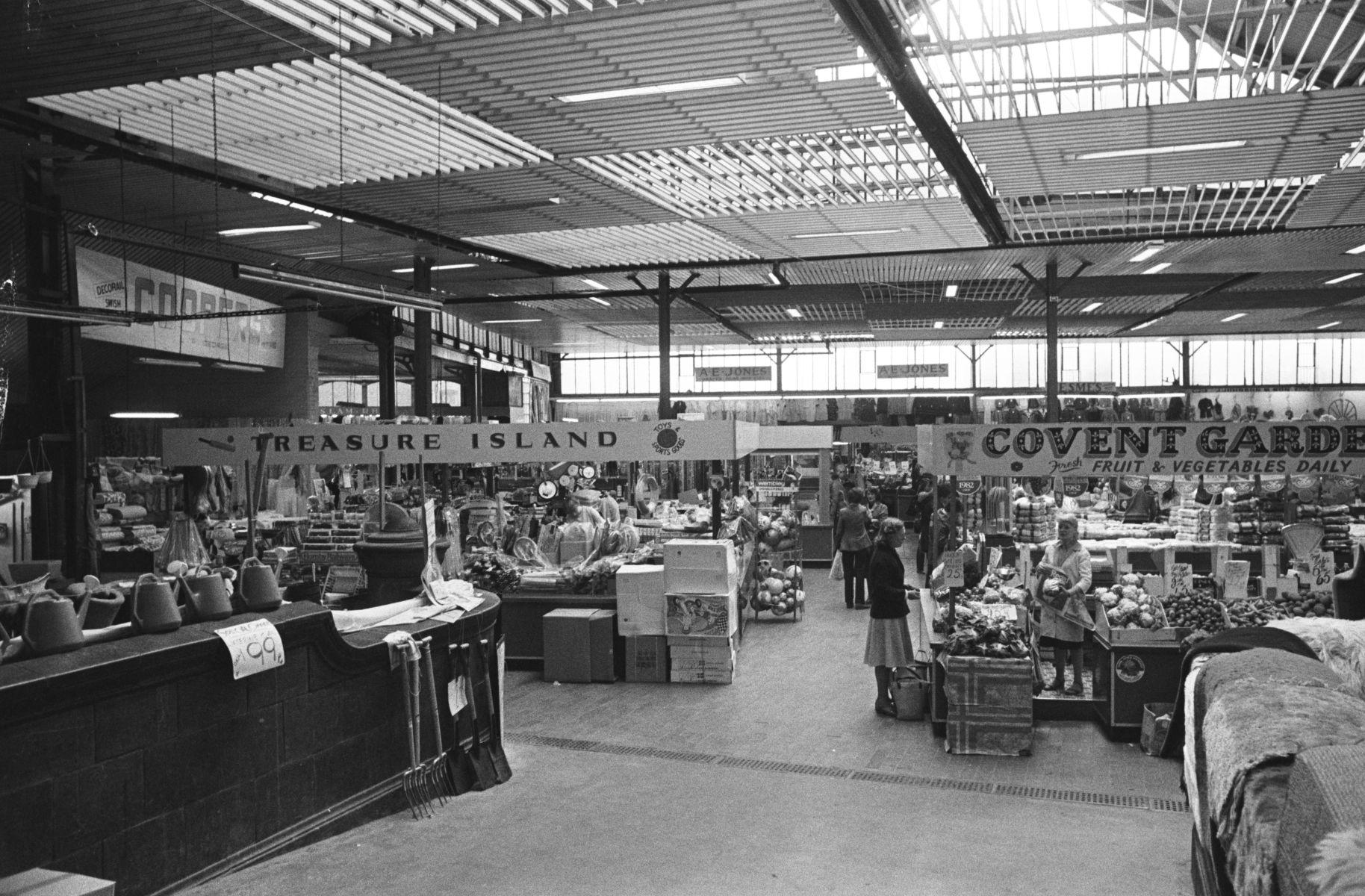
Inside the Vegetable Market in 1982

In 1894, a volunteer-run fire station was opened on Guildhall Square. Although proximity to the Guildhall led to comments by the council on the fire brigade's levels of service, with the council criticising them for being late to a fire. The council later set up their own fire brigade. The new brigade was tested when the Public Hall, also on Henblas Street, caught fire in 1906.

In 1916, a Crimean War cannon bearing the inscription "Captured Sevastopol 1855" was relocated from Guildhall Square to Bellevue Park.

==== 20th century demolition ====
The fire station was closed in 1957, with services moving to Bradley Road. The old guildhall was demolished in the early 1970s, while the Vegetable Market was demolished in 1990/1992, with local opposition to the demolition. The newly opened People's Market served as its replacement.

The loss of the old market and various other historic buildings in the area between Queen Street, Henblas Street, Chester Street and Lambpit Street, has led the area being termed as the "bomb site" by local historians.

=== Henblas Square ===
The shopping complex was constructed in October 1999, and opened by Tim Vincent. It is two storeys containing two large retail units, six smaller retail units, two kiosks and office space. Wrexham Council previously occupied the Tŷ Henblas office space above the retail units.

By 2015, the development had become a "ghost avenue", with many vacant units. The first major loss being T. J. Hughes in 2011, as the company went into administration. Another major occupant, British Home Stores (BHS) also went into administration, closing their Henblas Street unit in 2016.

In 2017, the complex was bought by MCR Property. In 2018, the council approved the development of flats on the upper floors of the empty retail units. However the council later withdrew permission in April 2019 when the developer asked their affordable housing obligations be reduced. The developer appealed the withdrawal of permission and later won. The developer also reduced rents in 2018 to entice new occupants and announced an investment of £4 million. They also called for the reduction of government-set business rates to encourage occupancy, threatening to "board up" the site if no action was taken.

In 2019, Sports Direct moved into the former BHS unit. In 2020, the science centre Xplore!, formerly Techniquest (in Wrexham), in the building formerly occupied by T. J. Hughes. In 2021, the retail parts of the Henblas Street development were put on sale.

In 2022, funding was announced for the adjacent General Market and Butchers' Market, with it hoped that the old Hippodrome site and the two markets could form a "market quarter" in Wrexham.

== Buildings ==
=== Hippodrome ===
The Hippodrome was a former theatre and cinema on Henblas Street, Wrexham, North Wales.

The general area where the site now stands was first part of Birmingham Square, but this part later became known as Union Square. The general area was occupied by Birmingham traders to serve as a marketplace to sell their hardware goods during Wrexham's annual March Fairs. The market was composed of a gallery containing shops surrounding a central open space. The market was roofed in 1873, forming a new building, and given the name Union Hall at around the same time. By then, it contained 52 shops. It was later referred to as the Public Hall, especially following the building's purchase by the Wrexham Public Hall and Corn Exchange Company in 1878. The company converted the building into a hall for the intended purpose of serving as a corn exchange, however, it instead served as an assembly room for public meetings and a theatrical and entertainment space. The Public Hall formed the central part of a commercial block, which also included a sweet factory, printing works, a warehouse, a bonded store, an old Masonic Hall, an Exchange Club, and multiple small offices. The buildings contained many passages to the point it was described as a "veritable warren". The Public Hall was destroyed in a fire in 1906/07.

A new building called the New Opera House & Public Hall was opened on 1 July 1909, to the designs of Chester architects Messrs Davies & Sons. Its two-storey exterior was a plain brick front, while its auditorium contained a curved balcony with frontal Baroque style ornamentation. However, the stage itself was "quite small" and in the shape of a triangle. In 1911, it was renamed the Wrexham Hippodrome or the Hippodrome Theatre. It was renamed again in 1920 as the Hippodrome Cinema, re-opening on 9 September 1920. The theatre closed in November 1959. It was described as the last of Wrexham's five music halls, alongside the Majestic (now Elihu Yale pub) and the Empire (now part of Saith Seren). On 13 June 1961, it re-opened as the Cine Variety House following years of alterations and renovations. Later in the 20th century, live theatre was no longer hosted in the building, instead, it was converted into a cinema in 1988. In 1998, the cinema closed, due to increasing competition from multi-screen cinemas.

It then stood empty and up for sale, until in 2004, the Hippodrome was bought by a property developer, however, its future was uncertain. There were local campaigns to save the building from redevelopment, giving it listed building status and reopening it, including support from comedian Ken Dodd. Wrexham council however commenced plans for a new purpose-built theatre for Wrexham instead. By 2006, planning consent was granted to demolish the building and construct commercial units on the 719-square-metre (7,740 sq ft) site.

On 16 June 2008, a major fire caused extensive damage to the building. In March/April 2009 the building was demolished. After being put on sale multiple times, in 2022, the council purchased the site. In 2022, funding was announced for the adjacent General Market and Butchers' Market, with it hoped the old Hippodrome site and the two markets can form a "market quarter" along the street in Wrexham. In October 2023, Rob McElhenney, submitted proposals for the development of a new park on the old Hippodrome site, named after Ryan Reynolds, of which the pair co-own Wrexham A.F.C.

=== Ryan Rodney Reynolds Memorial Park ===
The Ryan Rodney Reynolds Memorial Park is the tentative name of a proposed park on the street located on the old Hippodrome site. It was announced in October 2023 by Rob McElhenney, stating that he planned to submit proposals for the park. McElhenney dedicated it as a birthday "gift" for Ryan Reynolds, of which the pair co-own Wrexham A.F.C.. McElhenney announced the news on social media, stating that "This park will be beautiful. We'll have open green spaces, pop-up restaurants, we'll have movie screenings, there will be actual green lanterns, benches for old guys to swing on and a statue which may or may not look like Ryan." The accompanying social media video included an appearance of American actor Chris Pratt. The project is coined as the "Unofficial Department of Parks & Wrex", a spin on the Parks and Recreation TV series in which Pratt stars.

=== Xplore! ===
Xplore! is a science discovery centre located on Henblas Square. A relocation of the then called Techniquest Glyndŵr centre located at the Glyndwr University Plas Coch campus since 2003, it opened its relocated site on Henblas Square on 3 October 2020. The centre contained 100 new exhibits, totalling 111 exhibits, a 45-seat cafe and gift shop on opening its Henblas Street site in 2020.

The first proposals for a move, date to December 2014, when Techniquest Glyndŵr was reported to be potentially looking for a then stated second location in Wrexham city centre, with the former 31,000 sq ft (2,900 m^{2}) T. J. Hughes building on Henblas Street, vacant since 2011, rumoured as a potentially second location for the centre. In May 2019, plans for the Henblas Square site were revealed, including hopes to turn the area into an "interactive science park", as well as re-instating a "public right of way" between Henblas Street and Chester Street. The centre had hosted various pop-up events in the Henblas Street building on a short-term basis, maintaining its university site, but in May 2019 it applied to Wrexham County Borough Council stating it planned to make the relocation permanent.

=== Listed buildings ===
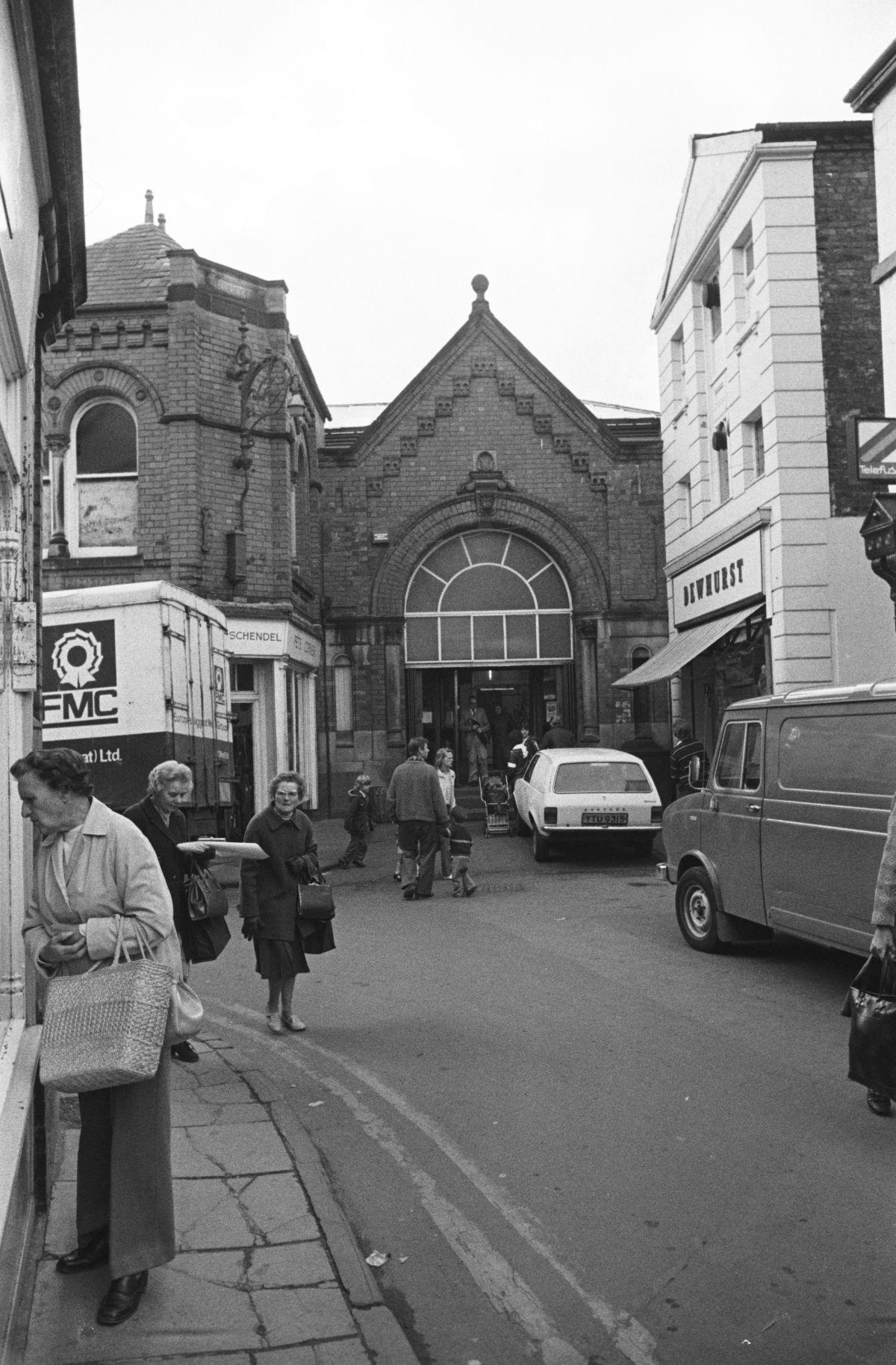
Rear entrance of the Butchers' Market, on what is now Henblas Street in 1982.

==== Butchers' Market ====
The Butchers' Market has an entrance on the street, alongside its High Street entrance. The Henblas Street entrance was constructed in 1880, and at the same time, the market was expanded. Adjacent, on the left, to this entrance is 40 Henblas Street which was built at the same time. At the top of it lies a sculptured bull's head, a reminder of Wrexham's historical importance as a market town.

==== General Market ====
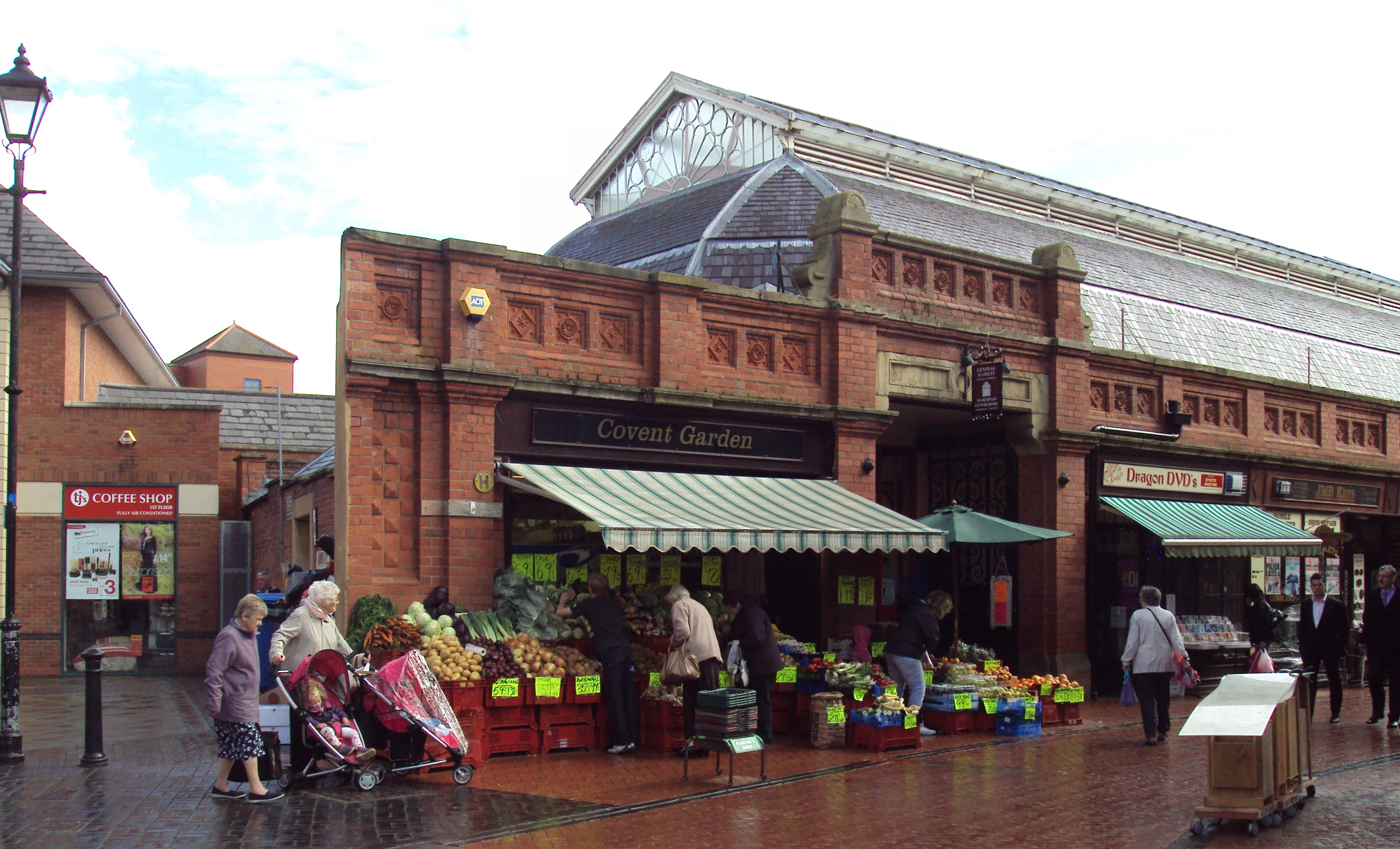
The General Market building along the street, on the site of the former Manchester Square.

Located opposite the Butchers' Market, is the main entrance to the General Market and buildings adjacent to it (including the public conveniences) that were constructed in the same style as the General Market. They were constructed in 1879. The General Market was previously known as the "Butter Market".

These include 21 to 29a Henblas Street and the Public Conveniences, which were built as part of the market's development. The General Market's glass roof can be seen above the shop fronts of 21 to 29a and from the ground floor of the public conveniences. The shopfront façades are made of Ruabon Red Brick with terracotta dressings, as well as containing another entrance to the General Market. The Public Conveniences is also built of the same material but contains a decorative glass fanlight above the door with the term "Ladies Cloakroom".

==== No. 40 ====
No. 40 is a Grade II listed building on Henblas Street. It was built in 1848 and designed by Thomas Penson. Its rear was extended in c. 1880. It is next to the rear entrance of the Butchers' Market.

=== Other historic buildings ===
Next to the Hippodrome was a temperance establishment that served as a leisure space, that was owned by the British Workman Public House Company. Instead of beer it gave workmen a mug of cocoa. It served as one of the few cocoa houses in Wrexham, with the others being on the High Street and Abbot Street.

Nearby on Lambpit Street, there was a pub known as the Raglan Arms named after Lord Raglan. Built in the 1850s, the pub was rebuilt in 1903 when the Vegetable Market was redeveloped. It was demolished in 1985 for the Henblas Square development.
