= Xplore! =

Science centre in Wrexham, Wales

Xplore! Science Discovery Centre
- Canolfan Darganfod Gwyddoniaeth Xplore! (Welsh)
- Former name: Techniquest@NEWI (2003–2009); Techniquest Glyndŵr (2009–2020)
- Established: April 2003; 23 years ago (as Techniquest@NEWI); 3 October 2020; 5 years ago (local re-opening); 7 December 2021; 4 years ago (official re-opening) (Note: delayed due to the pandemic and localised restrictions)
- Location: 17 Henblas Street, Wrexham, Wrexham County Borough, Wales LL13 8AE
- Coordinates: 53.04639°N 2.99191°W
- Type: Science centre
- Visitors: 13,000 (Oct 2020–Jan 22) (Note: Part of this period was under lockdown restrictions, for example from December 2020 in Wales.)
- Architect: DAY Architectural (for renovation)
- Owner: North Wales Science Limited (Wrexham University)
- Public transit access: Wrexham Central; Wrexham bus station
- Website: www.xplorescience.co.uk

Logo as Techniquest Glyndŵr.

Xplore! Science Discovery Centre, (Note: Welsh: Canolfan Darganfod Gwyddoniaeth Xplore!) branded simply as Xplore!, is a science centre in Wrexham, Wales. It is currently based between Henblas Street and Chester Street in Wrexham city centre. Formerly known as Techniquest@NEWI and Techniquest Glyndŵr, as a sister venue to Cardiff's Techniquest, it was housed on Wrexham University's (then Glyndŵr University) Plas Coch campus from 2003 until its relocation in 2020. The centre is operated by North Wales Science, a charity wholly owned by Wrexham University.

== Description ==
Xplore! is the trading name for North Wales Science, the charity operating the centre, and is fully owned by Wrexham University. The centre is currently based between Henblas Street and Chester Street in Wrexham city centre.

Various events have since been held in the centre or sponsored/organised by it. These events reported in media includes the; Darganfod/Discover science festival, Health and Care Research Wales' "Where would we be without research?", psychological networking, various community science and technology events, water-saving, and a Wonder Day event organised by Xplore! at St Giles' Church. While at Glyndŵr University it also hosted a kids money management event and a "Human Powered Day". As well as pop-up events.

=== Refurbishment ===
The 12-week refurbishment of 35,000 sq ft (3,300 m^{2}) of Henblas House (Welsh: Tŷ Henblas) was conducted by Spatial Environments, with DAY Architectural as the interior's architects. The building was formerly used by T. J. Hughes until 2011, and sits at the edge of a then largely empty retail space, with the relocation of the centre hoped to regenerate the area. DAY Architectural conceived and delivered the project for Wrexham Glyndŵr University, with branding applied by Scan Stick. Between October 2020 and January 2022 the centre attracted 13,000 people to its new site. The Henblas Street site is subdivided into four "zones" at launch; construction, reflection, action and the dark.

The centre while at Glyndŵr, delivered almost 203,000 hours of the STEAM fields, to more than 18,000 visitors in 2019.

As of August 2022, the centre opens on Fridays and weekends, with extended times during Wrexham's school holiday period.

== History ==
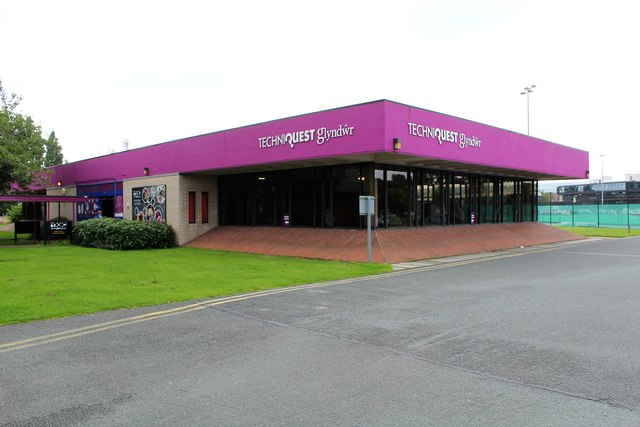
Techniquest Glyndŵr at Wrexham Glyndŵr University's Plas Coch campus in 2017.

A science centre had been operating on the North East Wales Institute's (NEWI) Plas Coch campus since April 2003, following increased demands for STEM engagements in North Wales. It initially was known as Techniquest@NEWI, adopting the brand of, and partnering with Techniquest in Cardiff, itself founded in 1985. When NEWI gained university status in 2008 to become Glyndŵr University, the centre similarly rebranded itself as Techniquest Glyndŵr (TQG) in 2009. It is operated by North Wales Science Limited, which is wholly owned by the university. The centre was opened in 2003 by Queen Elizabeth II.

In January 2014, the Welsh Government conducted a study into Techniquest's Cardiff and Wrexham sites, with both centres largely meeting their aims, although not consistently meeting government core grant targets, but also having a well-regarded brand, their perceived relevance to enhance STEM curricula by teachers, and their "strong" partnership networks with other STEM support providers and educational institutions.

On 20 July 2014, it hosted "Human Powered Day" inspired by human powered generators on bicycles present during that year's Tour de France.

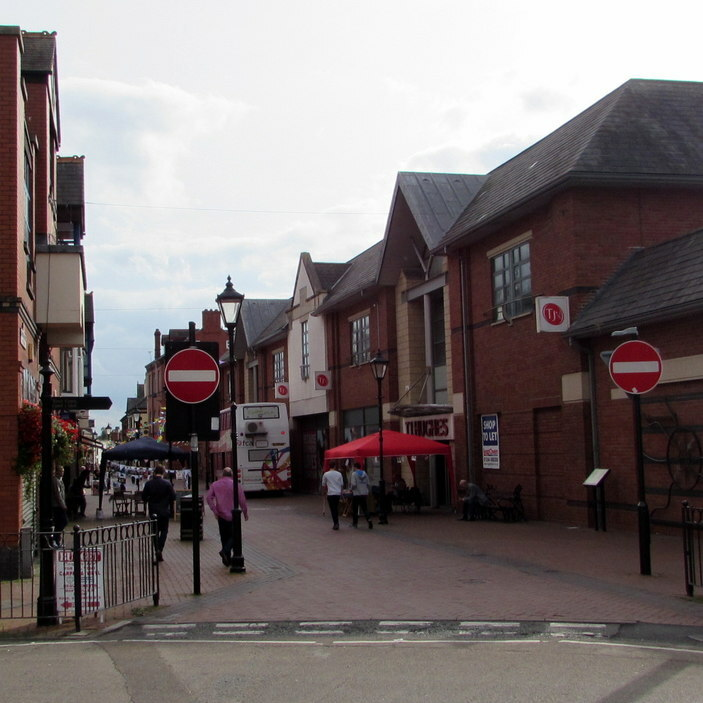
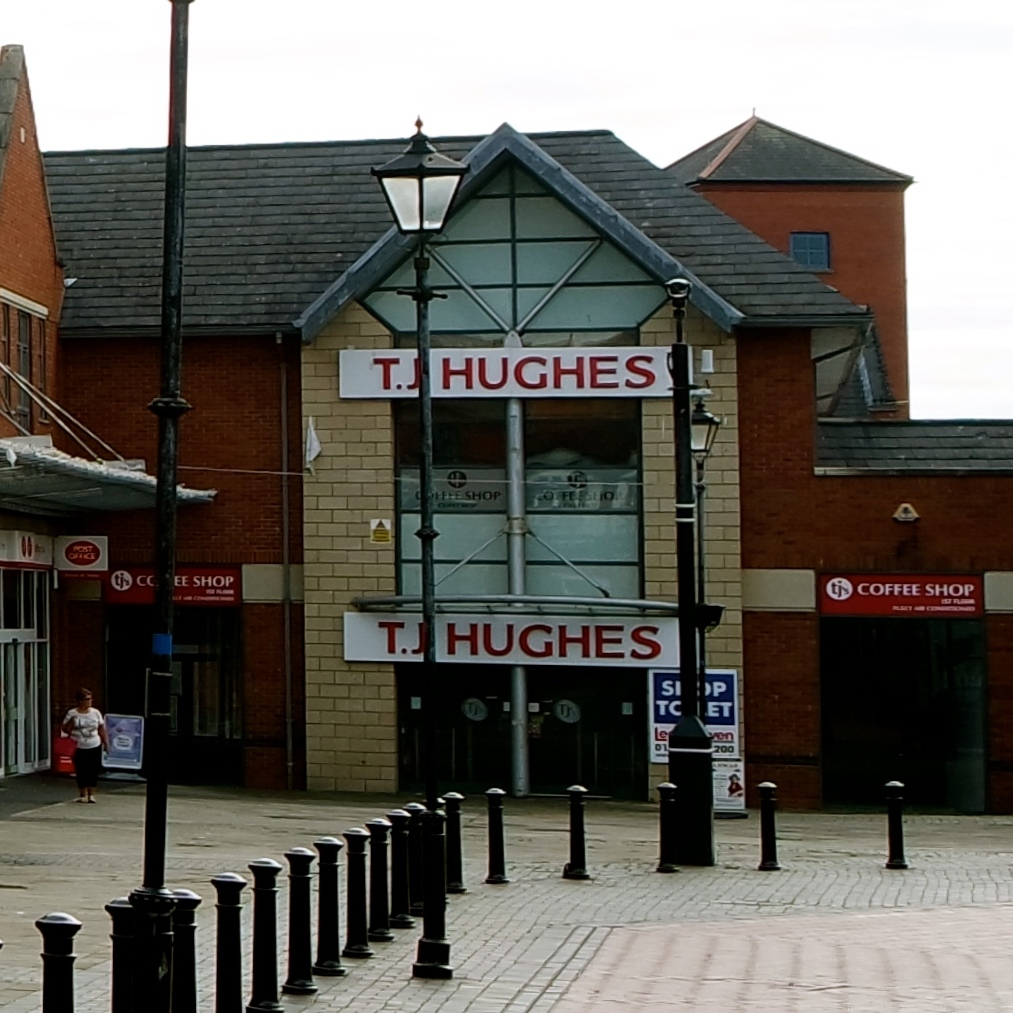
The building's Chester Street (left) and Henblas Street (right) entrances, while signed as TJ Hughes in 2016

In December 2014, Techniquest Glyndŵr was reported to be potentially looking for a second location in Wrexham city centre, with the former 31,000 sq ft (2,900 m^{2}) T. J. Hughes building, vacant since 2011, rumoured as a potentially second location for the centre. The centre stated at the time, that nothing was confirmed and they were in the early stages of discussions. At the time TQG stated their university site would be unaffected by a second location.

In January 2016, the Welsh Government announced a ~22% cut in funding to Techniquest Glyndŵr, following an announcement of a similar cut by percentage to Techniquest in Cardiff. Although branded both "Techniquest" both sites are operated separately by different charities, with the Wrexham site's ties to Glyndŵr University, as well as local industry and existing plans for long-term financial sustainability stated as reasons for the Wrexham branch to be better positioned in the event of a public funding cut.

In September 2016, the Welsh Government announced it will be ending its funding to both Techniquest (in Cardiff) and Techniquest Glyndŵr by April 2021.

In February 2017, the centre announced it had welcomed 80,000 visitors in 2016, up from 40,000 annual visitors in 2012.

In May 2017, the centre was successful in receiving £34,000 in funding for redeveloping a derelict and vacant area near to the centre's university site into a "Science Garden". The garden opened on 29 September 2017.

The centre submitted an initial proposal in October 2017 for grant funding for a new site. With the proposal advancing to the second round.

In February 2018, Techniquest Glyndŵr had signed a 12-month agreement with the owners, MCR Property Group, of the former TJ Hughes store in Henblas Square, as well as the local council and the university, to potentially occupy the building. In the announcement it was due to open in 2019 on a short-term lease, with the university site, stated at the time, would also remain open.

In March 2018, the centre applied to the Wellcome Trust for redevelopment funding of a city centre site. With the Inspiring Science Fund (ISF) granting funds in 2019, commencing building works for the centre's relocation.

On 23–25 August 2018, Techniquest Glyndŵr hosted a pop-up science event at the former TJ Hughes building on Henblas Street, collaborating with the Royal Air Force to celebrate its 100th anniversary.

In May 2019, plans for the Henblas Square site were revealed, including hopes to turn the area into an "interactive science park", as well as re-instating a "public right of way" between Henblas Street and Chester Street. The centre had hosted various pop-up events in the Henblas Street building on a short-term basis, maintaining its university site, but in May 2019 it applied to Wrexham County Borough Council stating it planned to make the relocation permanent.

On 20 June 2019, Techniquest Glyndŵr's formally announced its plans to fully relocate to and buying the freehold of the Henblas Street site in Wrexham city centre. The plan was approved by Wrexham Council on 29 June after the centre secured £2.5 million in funding for the project from the ISF, Welsh Government and Wrexham council. Techniquest Glyndŵr's site at Wrexham Glyndŵr University's campus would now be replaced under the proposals.

In July 2019, the centre announced it will drop the "Techniquest" brand. With "Spectra/Sbectra", "Xplore!" and "Helio" as the eventual final three contenders.

In October 2019, the centre partnered with Principality Building Society to launch a financial education programme for North Wales, Chester and Shrewsbury, delivering financial education lessons, including identifying money, how to save money and costing, to eleven local community schools by October 2019.

In October 2019, the centre began its search for a contractor to perform refurbishment work for the centre's relocation from the Wrexham Glyndŵr University campus.

On 16 December 2019, redevelopment works began at the city centre site.

On 28 January 2020, Techniquest Glyndŵr announced its rebrand to "Xplore!". The centre collaborated with North Wales-based Worldspan Creative to design the graphics for the new brand. 200 names were initially put forward, later reduced to three shortlisted names ("Spectra/Sbectra", "Xplore!" and "Helio"), with "Xplore!" receiving support across several demographics.

It was initially expected to open in April 2020, but was delayed due to the COVID-19 pandemic in Wales.

In June 2020, the centre, alongside forty other UK Association for Science and Discovery Centres institutions, joined the Science Centres For Our Future' UK-wide campaign for the UK Government to award emergency resilience funding following a mandated closure of the centres due to the COVID-19 pandemic.

=== Relocation ===
The relocated centre opened on 3 October 2020, containing 100 new exhibits, totalling to 111 exhibits, a 45-seat cafe and gift shop at opening on Henblas Street. Funding for the £2.8 million was supported by UK Research and Innovation, the Department for Business, Energy and Industrial Strategy and the Wellcome Trust's Inspiring Science Fund (£1.75 million), Wrexham Glyndŵr University, and a local partnership, the Targeted Regeneration Investment programme, between Wrexham County Borough Council and the Welsh Government (£750,000). The only visitors allowed to attend the opening however had to be from Wrexham County Borough following the introduction of local lockdown health measures in the county borough in response to the COVID-19 pandemic.

In April 2021, the centre partnered with Hafren Dyfrdwy, the local water and wastewater provider, in a five-year charitable partnership to set up to interactive exhibits sponsored by the water company. One exhibit would be focused on what shouldn't be put down toilets or kitchen drains, and the other on configuring a pipe network for a house using blue water balls to then educate users the average amount of litres needed to complete many household tasks.

In May 2021, Quality Education with Care (QEWC) held a "Science for HE" programme of activities at the centre.

In July 2021, Principality Building Society renewed their partnership with the centre, following their collaboration in 2019.

On 7 December 2021, the centre was officially opened by a ribbon-cutting ceremony, which was unable to have taken place earlier due to public health restrictions related to the COVID-19 pandemic. Staff, stakeholders and dignitaries attended the ceremony, with deputy mayor of Wrexham, Brian Cameron cutting the ribbon.

On 9 July 2022, Xplore! and St Giles' Church hosted a Wonder Day event, which included activities such as a stardome, electric circuit demonstrations and "mysteries of slime". Xplore! has been co-operating with local churches to host activities and scientific experiments in the buildings.

On 6–7 August 2022, the centre and neighbouring Tŷ Pawb hosted the Darganfod/Discover science festival, with family activities, performances and demonstrations held at the centre for the event.

On 14 August 2022, the centre hosted free science and technology events for refugees and asylum seekers.

On 20 August 2022, Health and Care Research Wales hosted "Where would we be without research?", a free event highlighting the impact research has had on human life.

On 1 September 2022, a psychological networking event for businesses and individuals is to be hosted at the centre.

In September 2023, the centre was successful in its bid to receive funding from the UK Government's Shared Prosperity Fund. The centre would also perform some redevelopment work on its city centre building, such as improving energy efficiency and reducing the centre's carbon footprint.

== See also ==
- List of science centers#Europe
