= Hippodrome, Wrexham =

Former cinema in Wrexham, Wales

Hippodrome
- The theatre's auditorium in 1985
- Interactive map of the Hippodrome area
- Former names: New Opera House & Public Hall (1909); Cine Variety House (1961)
- Alternative names: Hippodrome Theatre; Wrexham Hippodrome; Hippodrome 1 & 2

General information
- Status: Destroyed
- Architectural style: Brick exterior, with Baroque style auditorium balcony
- Location: Henblas Street, Wrexham, Wales, United Kingdom
- Coordinates: 53.04600°N 2.99265°W
- Opened: 1 July 1909; 116 years ago
- Renovated: 13 June 1961; 64 years ago
- Closed: 1998; 28 years ago
- Destroyed: 16 June 2008; 17 years ago (fire); March–April 2009; 16 years ago (demolition)

Technical details
- Floor count: 2

Design and construction
- Architects: Messrs Davies & Sons

The Hippodrome was a theatre and cinema on Henblas Street, Wrexham, in North Wales. It was part of a site known as Birmingham Square, and its section later became the Union Square market square. The market building was then roofed and converted into Union Hall, or later the Public Hall, a meeting and entertainment space from 1873 until it burned down in a fire in 1906/07.

In 1909, the New Opera House & Public Hall opened on the site, and was renamed the Hippodrome Theatre in 1911, and started operating as a cinema in 1920. The theatre operations ceased in 1959, and it reopened as Cine Variety House in 1961, showing films and variety shows. Later in the 20th century, it became purely a cinema until its closure in 1998.

The building then lay vacant, and was bought by a property developer in 2004. It was approved for demolition in 2006, but burned down in another fire in June 2008, and the site was cleared in 2009. In 2023, American actor and co-owner of Wrexham A.F.C., Rob McElhenney, announced proposals for the Ryan Rodney Reynolds Memorial Park to be built on the site, named after his Wrexham A.F.C. co-owner, the Canadian-American actor Ryan Reynolds.

== History ==
=== Public Hall ===
The general area where the site now stands was first part of Birmingham Square, but this part later became known as Union Square. The general area was occupied by Birmingham traders to serve as a marketplace to sell their hardware goods during Wrexham's annual March Fairs. The market was composed of a gallery containing shops surrounding a central open space. The market was roofed in 1873, forming a new building, and given the name Union Hall at around the same time. By then, it contained 52 shops. It was later referred to as the Public Hall, especially following the building's purchase by the Wrexham Public Hall and Corn Exchange Company in 1878. The company converted the building into a hall for the intended purpose of serving as a corn exchange, however, it instead served as an assembly room for public meetings and a theatrical and entertainment space.

The Public Hall formed the central part of a commercial block, which also included a sweet factory, printing works, a warehouse, a bonded store, an old Masonic Hall, an Exchange Club, and multiple small offices. The buildings contained many passages to the point it was described as a "veritable warren".

The Public Hall was destroyed in a fire in 1906/07. It is believed that the fire originated in the complex's sweet factory, and by the time it was discovered, a significant amount of smoke and flames were spreading across Henblas Street, which was further complicated by strong winds. There were concerns the fire could spread to Bank Street, where the walls of its cottages and shops were becoming "red hot", as well as spreading to buildings on Hope Street. The fire was confined by firefighters to the central part of the block, assisted by a recently acquired steam-powered ('steamer') fire engine.

The print works, adjoining the sweet factory at the top of the building, contained multiple heavy presses and hundredweights of metals. After a period of time, the fire led to the print works' floor collapsing, sending all the heavy material into the bonded stores below. This led to sparks being produced, setting the Public Hall's stage scenery alight. In what was described as the hall's "last drama to be enacted", the fire spread across the roof, above the gallery and through the ventilators until the rafters collapsed and all fell into the main body of the hall. The fire was the first major test for the newly re-formed Wrexham Fire Brigade and their new steam fire engine, but the firefighters managed to prevent the fire from spreading onto other buildings on Henblas Street, Bank Street, Hope Street and possibly the whole Market Hall area.

=== Rebuilding ===
A new building called the New Opera House & Public Hall was opened on 1 July 1909, to the designs of Chester architects Messrs Davies & Sons. Its two-storey exterior was a plain brick front, while its auditorium contained a curved balcony with frontal Baroque style ornamentation. However, the stage itself was "quite small" and in the shape of a triangle. When it opened it was first advertised in the Wrexham Advertiser.

In 1911, it was renamed the Wrexham Hippodrome or the Hippodrome Theatre. While "The Wrexham Hippodrome Ltd" company was registered in July 1913. It was renamed again in 1920 as the Hippodrome Cinema, re-opening on 9 September 1920 with a Gaumont-British film The Donovan Affair. The building hosted film and live theatre for years until the theatre's closure in November 1959. It was described as the last of Wrexham's five music halls (later becoming cinemas), alongside the Majestic (now Elihu Yale pub) and the Empire (now part of Saith Seren).

On 13 June 1961, it re-opened as the Cine Variety House following years of alterations and renovations, and largely to the building's original state. This re-opening was under the Flanagan family, and over the following years it hosted film and variety, particularly as stage shows and pop concerts until the 1970s. Later in the 20th century, live theatre was no longer hosted in the building. Instead, it was converted into a cinema, known as the Hippodrome 1 & 2, being subdivided into two screens with a total of 950 seats in 1988, which on re-opening showed the films Who Framed Roger Rabbit and Willow. In 1998, the cinema closed, connected to its failure to obtain a first run of the film Titanic.

=== Proposed demolition and fire ===
It then stood empty and up for sale, until in 2004, the Hippodrome was bought by a Cheshire property developer aiming to turn it to retail space, however its future was uncertain. There were local campaigns to save the building from re-development giving it listed building status and have it re-opened, including support from comedian Ken Dodd. Although Wrexham council commenced plans for a new purpose-built theatre for Wrexham instead. Cadw did inspect whether the site would meet listed status. Campaigners had hoped the building would become a media centre for the community.

By 2006, planning consent was granted to demolish the building and construct commercial units on the 719-square-metre (7,740 sq ft) site.

On 16 June 2008, a major fire caused extensive damage to the building. This was merely days after the death of its previous manager, Barry Flanagan. The fire was believed to have been started near the sofa on its ground floor. It took firefighters five hours to control the fire, and they came across north-east Wales as far as Rhyl. A 33-year-old man was arrested in connection to the fire. In March/April 2009 the building was demolished.

In February 2018, the site was sold for £98,000 to an unknown buyer, with retail and residential plans for the site later submitted in November 2018. It was later put up for sale again in 2019. In 2022, the council purchased the site. The Hippodrome had an old, large Art Deco light which hung from the ceiling. It was purchased by Flanagan from a cinema in Liverpool. The light was sold after the building's demolition, but local historians located and restored it. In November 2017, it was hung up on the South Arcade of Tŷ Pawb, alongside an information board about the Hippodrome. In 2022, funding was announced for the adjacent General Market and Butchers' Market, with it hoped the old Hippodrome site and the two markets can form a "market quarter" in Wrexham.

== Proposed park ==
In October 2023, Rob McElhenney submitted proposals for the development of a new park, the Ryan Rodney Reynolds Memorial Park, to be on the old Hippodrome site. McElhenney dedicated it as a "gift" for Ryan Reynolds; the pair co-own Wrexham A.F.C.
