= Bellevue Park, Wrexham =

Public park in Wrexham, Wales

Bellevue Park Welsh: Parc Bellevue / Parciau
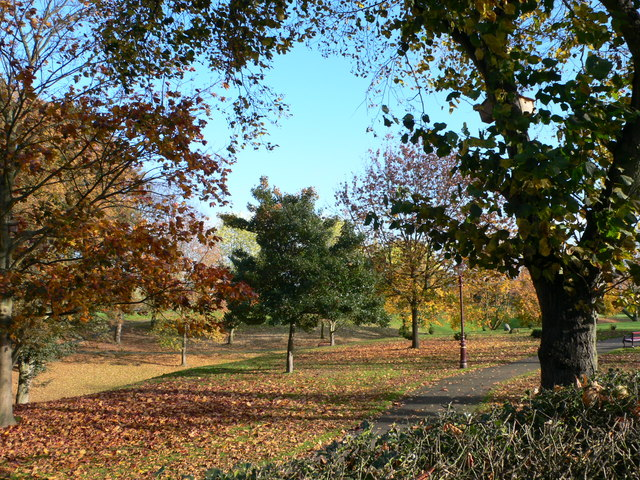
- Wooded Area within the Park
- Interactive map of Bellevue Park; Welsh: Parc Bellevue / Parciau
- Type: Public city park
- Location: Wrexham, Wrexham, Wales
- Coordinates: 53.043°N 2.999°W
- Created: 1906
- Operator: Wrexham County Borough Council
- Status: Open all year round

Bellevue Park (Welsh: Parc Bellevue), historically known as the Parciau, is an Edwardian park located in the city of Wrexham in northeastern Wales. It was built to commemorate the jubilee year of the incorporation of the town. It has a natural amphitheatre in its southeastern area which holds regular concerts and live music performances during the summer months.

== Geography ==
The park is located in the centre of Wrexham. It is bordered by Bradley Road on the west, Ruthin Road on the south, Tenters Square on the east/northeast and Bellevue Road on the northwest.

== Regeneration ==
During the 1970s Bellevue Park was neglected and many of the amenities were in a poor state of repair. A major project was undertaken to refurbish the park back to its original splendour. This was funded by the Heritage Lottery Fund, Urban Parks Project, Welsh Development Agency, and the European Regional Development Fund. The park reopened in June 2000. It now boasts children's play areas, a bowling green which is home to the Parciau Bowling Club, tennis and basketball courts, an original Edwardian bandstand set in an amphitheatre, and a jogging route for walkers and joggers. The park itself has many walkways through mature tree-lined avenues as well as affording some magnificent views of the parish church. The park is well lit and has a number of CCTV cameras installed to deter antisocial behaviour.

Bellevue Park has once again regained its popularity with the people of Wrexham. Throughout the summer months, a broad spectrum of social events take place, such as music concerts for all tastes and "fun days" for children.

== History ==
In the late 19th century requirements for a park were identified, although it was not until 1906 that the location of "The Parciau" was finally secured as an add-on to the existing Ruabon Road cemetery site. It was designed to commemorate the Jubilee Year of the incorporation of Wrexham. The Parciau was developed from 1910, with the entrance gates and lodge being provided by public subscriptions. The statue of Queen Victoria was originally placed in 1905 by the Guildhall and moved in the 1920s to a location in the Parciau next to the pavilion. The pavilion was converted in the 1970s to provide a community centre. During the Second World War, the Parciau was turned over for the production of food to supply school canteens. The bandstand which is built in its own natural amphitheatre was often used for Sunday brass concerts, but by the late 1960s it had become disused and unsafe and was nearly demolished: however, it was refurbished in 1973. In 2015 Belle Vue Park was dedicated as a Fields in Trust Centenary Field because of its links with veterans of two world wars.

From 2016 to 2023, a local football club was named after and based at the park until it moved to a nearby sports field. Founded in 2016, it was inclusion-focused and competed in the North East Wales Football League in 2017.

In July 2024, the park was awarded the Green Flag Award.
