= General Market, Wrexham =

Market in Wrexham, Wales

General Market
- Y Farchnad Gyffredinol (Welsh)
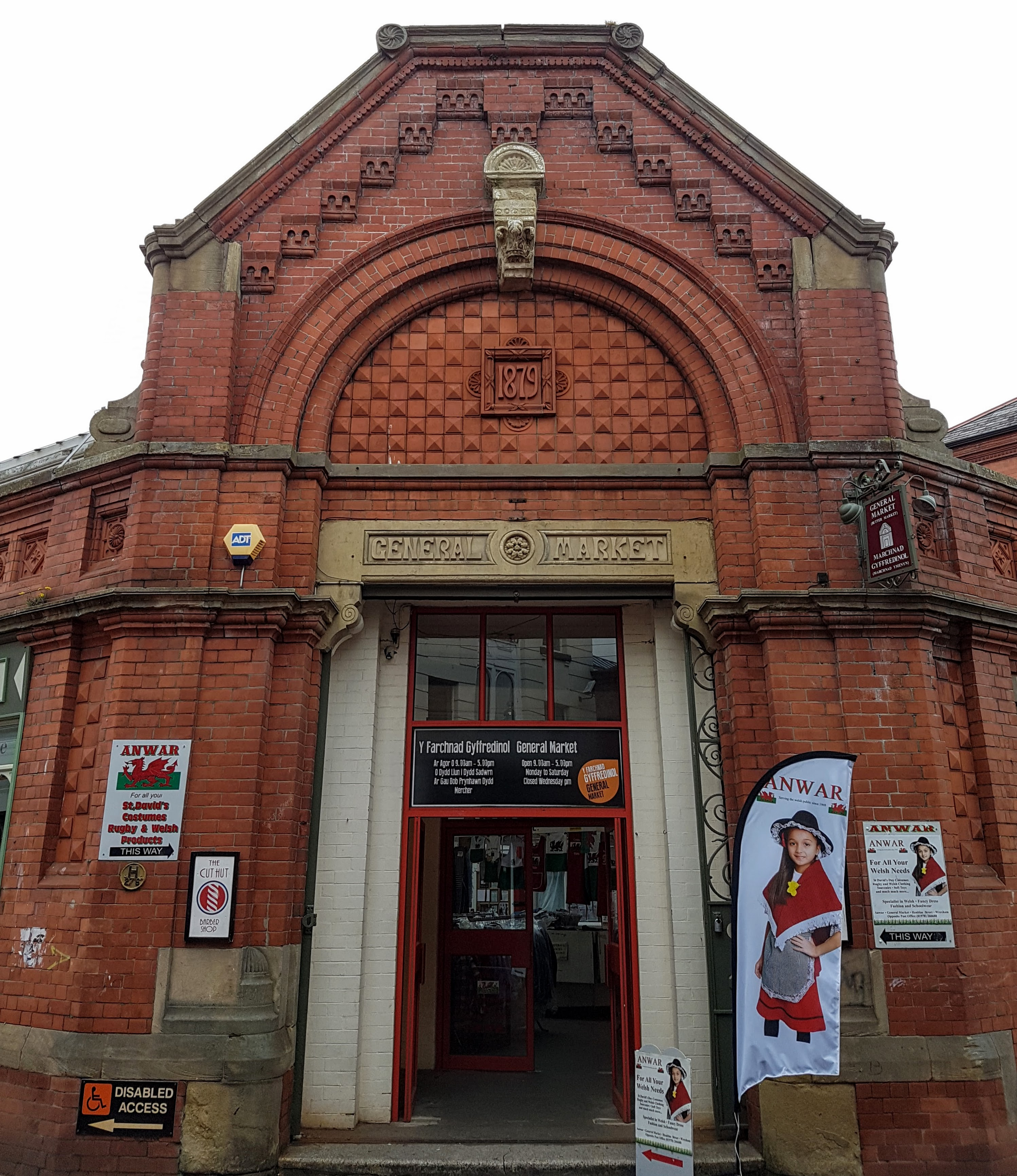
- The market's entrance facing the Butcher's Market (off-photo)
- Interactive map of the General Market area
- Former names: Butter Market

General information
- Location: Rhosddu, Wrexham, Wales
- Coordinates: 53.045948°N 2.992111°W
- Opened: 1879
- Renovated: 2023–24

Technical details
- Floor count: 1

Other information
- Number of stores: 20

Listed Building – Grade II
- Official name: General Market Building
- Designated: 4 June 1985; Amended 31 January 1994
- Reference no.: 16493, 16494, 16495, 16496, 16498, and 1838

Listed Building – Grade II
- Official name: General Market Buildings
- Designated: 4 June 1985; Amended 31 January 1994
- Reference no.: 16497

Listed Building – Grade II
- Official name: General Market Building - Public Convenience (Ladies)
- Designated: 4 June 1985; Amended 31 January 1994
- Reference no.: 16499

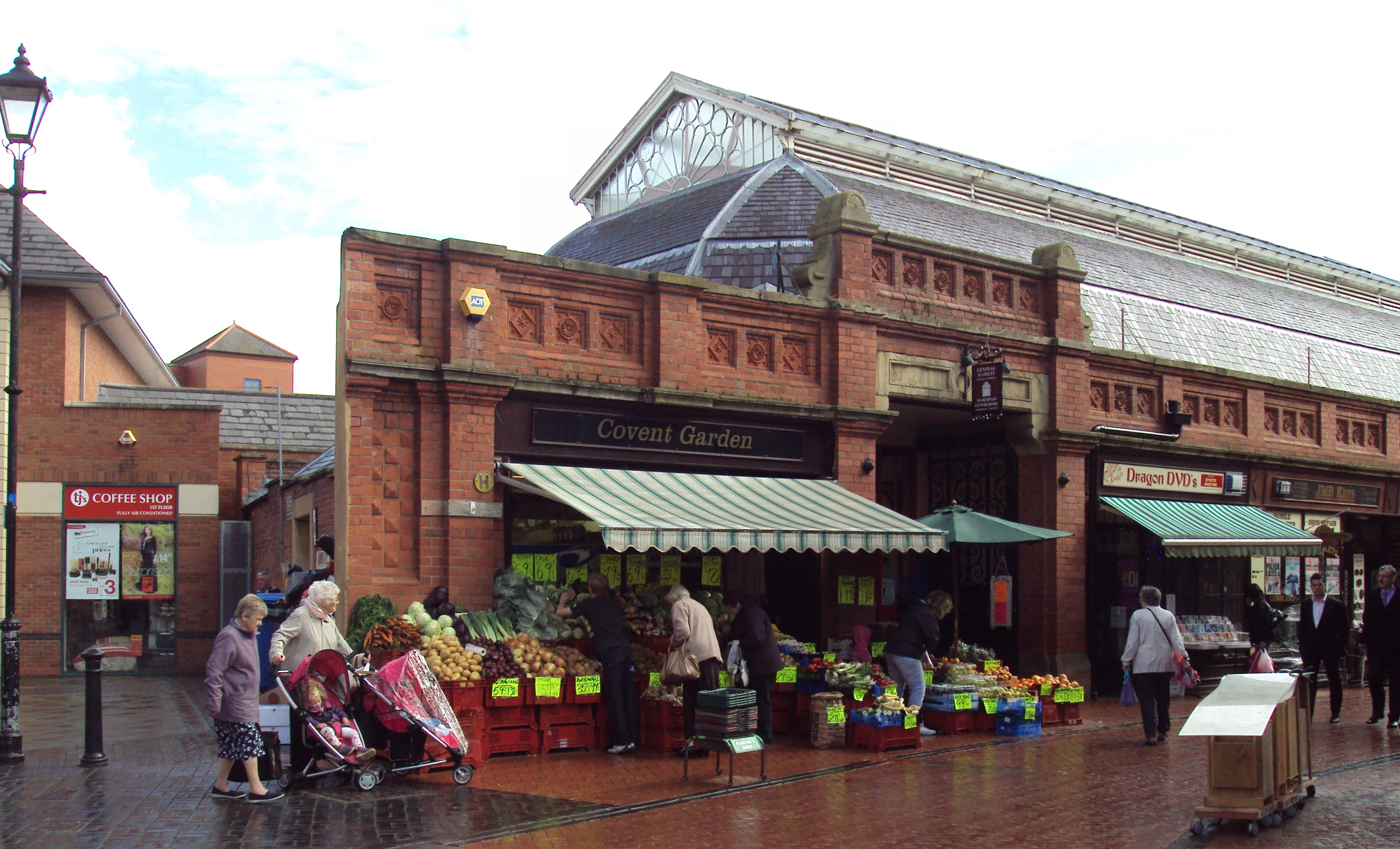
View of the General Market from Henblas Square

The General Market (Welsh: Y Farchnad Gyffredinol; or Marchnad Gyffredinol) is an indoor market in Wrexham city centre, North Wales. It is situated inside a Grade II listed building between Wrexham's Henblas Street and Chester Street on a site formerly known as Manchester Square. Built in 1879 as the Butter Market, it is one of the two dedicated indoor markets of Wrexham.

The indoor market has since suffered from declining visitor numbers over the last few years, and as a result Wrexham County Borough Council announced plans to re-develop the indoor market between 2023 and 2024, with it reopening in November 2024.

== Description ==
The market has entrances via Henblas Street, Henblas Square and Chester Street. The main building and the shops located around its exterior are Grade II listed buildings.

The market contains around 20 stalls, including for clothing, food, florists and greengrocers, and is the smallest of Wrexham's markets, with the other markets being the Butcher's Market and Tŷ Pawb (previously the People's Market).

The building is made of a top-lit market hall, with a row of six shops along the building's front with Henblas Street (such as 21 to 29a Henblas Street), and a public toilet on its south-eastern corner. Of the Henblas Street shopfronts, some retain part of their original designs, especially for the northern range which houses shops, containing recessed doorways and iron-framed windows. The exterior is composed of screen walls, containing exterior shops and the market's entrance to its interior. The one-storey screen walls are made of red Ruabon brick, with freestone ashlar dressings and terracotta enrichments. It has a parabolic slate roof with continuous glazed clerestory, with ornate traceries in the north-facing gable. The building has brick pilasters, panelled parapets with diaperwork and paterae, while the shopfronts have a continuous stone cornice. A raised parapet is present over the western entrance to the market, with volute brackets, and panelled lintel ironwork double gates.

The market's main entrance, facing at an angle south-west towards the Butcher's Market, has a flat-topped raised gable with stepped corbels to an Italianate Romanesque parapet, a Prince of Wales motif–marked stone keyblock, and a patterned tympanum with a brick panel defaced with "1879" under a pilaster-flanked round arch. The building also has a recessed moulded lintel with the inscription "General Market", and oculi-set patterned panels. The building's other entrance has scrolled screen walls to paired iron gates. There may be remains of Wrexham's cockpit in the building's rear wall. The interior is made of 5 bays with side-aisles for market stalls, and with tall round arched girders arising from ornamental cast-iron capitals over a set of octagonal columns with brackets to horizontal beams over the market's ground floor. Openwork metal brackets are present in the building between trusses and had a tongue and groove boarded roof, with metal stays and top lanterns with one boarded end fanlights.

== History ==
The market is situated on the former site known as "Manchester Square", which held an open market for out-of-town traders, particularly those from Manchester selling textiles, during annual fairs in the town. The square was later converted into Manchester Hall, and still selling linen, cotton and other fancy goods from Manchester. The site was also home to a smaller building housing a "Potato Market", and a music hall, with both demolished in the 1870s.

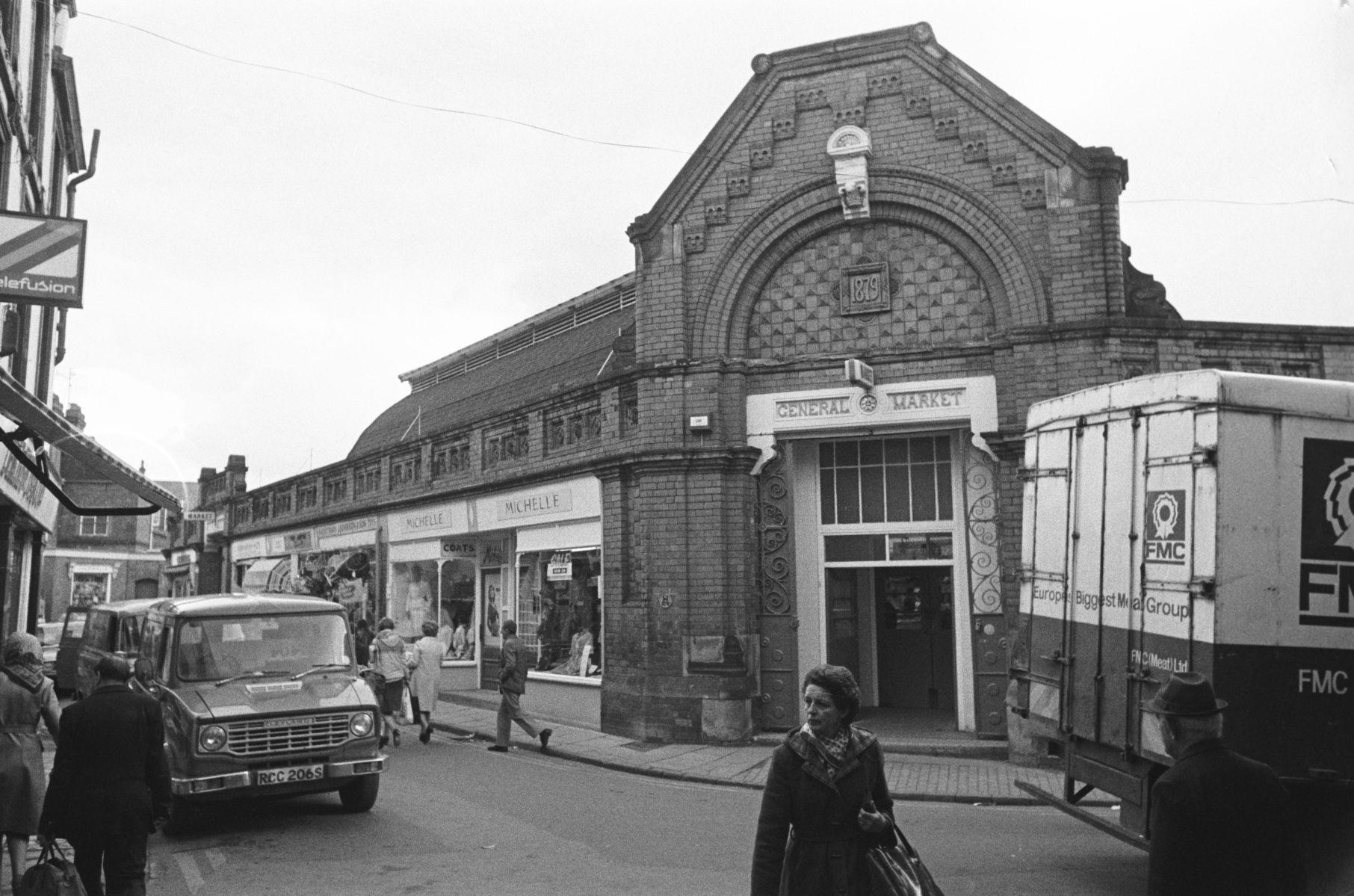
The General Market along what is now Henblas Street in 1982.

The General Market was opened in 1879, and was originally named the "Butter Market". This name was indicative of its main original purpose as a trading place for selling (farmhouse) butter and other dairy products. It is said the wives of farmers competed with each other to sell butter to customers. However, the introduction of rationing in the United Kingdom during World War II in 1939 and new hygiene regulations caused the market to be converted into a "general market", with the tradition of selling farmhouse butter greatly reduced. In 1943 the ("butter") market served as a cafeteria for the Acton Park–based 33rd Signals Construction Battalion and 400th Armoured Field Artillery Battalion of the United States Army Medical Corps. There are no remains of "Manchester Square" nor of many of the Victorian structures in the area following the market's construction.

=== Re-development ===
The council first committed itself to the improvement of the Butcher's and General Markets in 2013, following a decrease in occupancy in Wrexham markets from 90% in 2007 to 70% in 2013. In March 2014 a planning application was submitted for the potential refurbishment of the interior and exterior of the building, including removing vegetation, cleaning masonry, de-cluttering the façade, and redecorating the shop fronts with new signage. In April 2014, a wider plan for Wrexham's three markets was considered, with the General Market to be focussed on bars and restaurants in order to stimulate the night-time economy; the plan would have cost £729,000.

In May 2016, the council backed a report which proposed a renovation and modernisation of the Butcher's and General Markets. In May 2019, the council announced that it was looking to secure funds from the National Lottery, with a priority being given to a bid asking for £1.5 million for the re-development of the two markets.

In February 2020, following a prolonged decrease in visitor numbers and an increase in empty stalls in the market and the adjacent Butcher's Market, it was reported that £2 million of funding can be secured for the buildings' redevelopment from the Welsh Government, the National Lottery and the council budget if the council backed plans to organise such funding. In 2018 Wrexham County Borough Council had set up a taskforce to investigate how to improve the two markets. The chair of the taskforce, Councillor Paul Roberts, stated that there was a lack of consistency of traders' opening times, reluctance to utilise Wrexham's night-time economy, and an unattractive market layout for shoppers, with existing traders raising concerns on how any such work would impact their incomes. £2 million in funding for the two markets was approved by the Welsh Government under its Transforming Towns initiative in March 2022. The plans are hoped to be part of a wider plan to create a "perfect market quarter" in Wrexham, inspired by similar market redevelopment plans in Chester and Shrewsbury.

During the COVID-19 pandemic in Wales, the market's weekly visitor numbers had decreased from 1,445 to 835 per week by October 2020, a decrease of 42.2 per cent.

In October 2022, plans were submitted for re-developing the market, with the local architects Lawray Architects producing the designs. The council stated that the market required essential maintenance, repairs, and modernisation. A redevelopment of the market was proposed as part of the Wrexham Townscape Heritage Scheme, using funding from the National Lottery Heritage Fund, the Welsh Government's Transforming Towns Fund, and Wrexham Council's own capital programme. The plans proposed that the central stall layout be changed to "improve circulation", with the hall redecorated and flexible units created for tenants, while the existing historic outer units will be refurbished, and a new café added. During the redevelopment works, existing traders were offered to move temporarily to Queens Square.

In January 2023, the redevelopment of the market was approved by the council's planning department. In April 2023, the council admitted there was a slight delay to the refurbishment. It and the Butchers' Market, reopened on 28 November 2024, co-inciding with Wrexham's Victorian Christmas market.
