= Plas Coch =

Area of Wrexham

Coordinates: 53°03′18″N 3°00′23″W

Plas Coch: Welsh: Plas-coch
- Neighbourhood
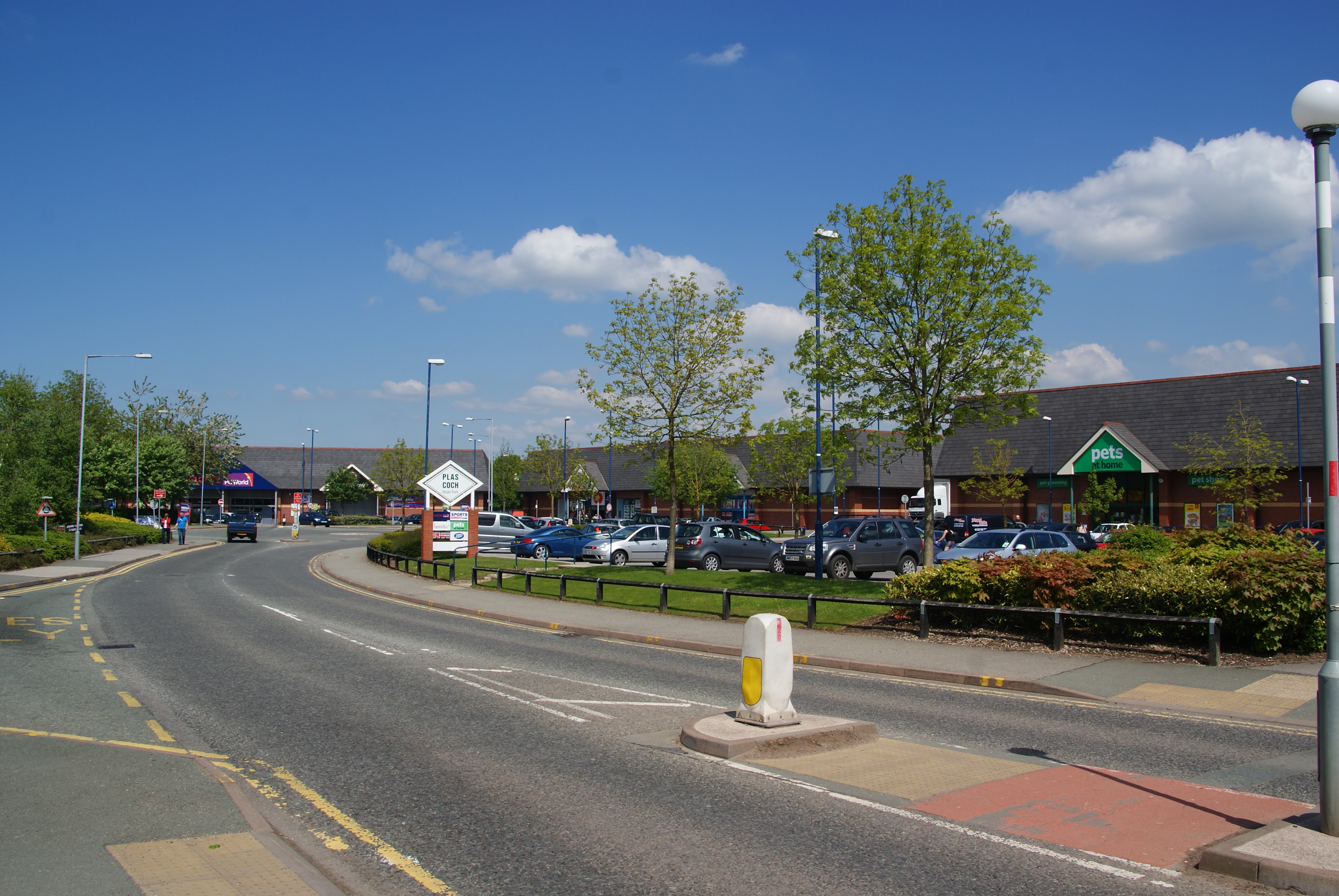
- Plas Coch Retail Park

- Location within Wrexham
- OS grid reference: SJ3238751013
- Principal area: Wrexham
- Preserved county: Clwyd
- Country: Wales
- Sovereign state: United Kingdom
- Post town: WREXHAM
- Postcode district: LL11
- Dialling code: 01978
- Police: North Wales
- Fire: North Wales
- Ambulance: Welsh
- UK Parliament: Wrexham
- Senedd Cymru – Welsh Parliament: Wrexham

Plas Coch (Welsh: Plas-coch) is an area of the community of Rhosddu, in the city of Wrexham, Wales. A major retail and educational area of Wrexham, it lies to the north-west of Wrexham city centre. Formerly known as Lower Stansty, the term has fallen out of use in preference for Plas Coch in recent years, likely due to the popular retail area which shares its name.

== History ==
During the Roman period, Plas Coch was a Roman farm settlement, which the existing Plas Coch pub is located on.

One of the Wrexham area's main houses was Plas Coch in Lower Stansty, built in the late 16th century of mature hand-made red brick, hence the name "Plas Coch" (translating roughly as "Red Hall" in Welsh). It was a two-storey building: the plan of the dwelling was a typical through passage house with access at either end of the passage. The house was built for Sir William Meredith, one of the sons of Richard Meredith of Allington or Trevalyn (near Rossett) and treasurer and paymaster of the army in the reigns of Elizabeth I and James I. Edward Meredith, a brother to William, was recorded in 1610 as trading as draper in Cheapside, London and he had held the lease on Plas Coch from his nephew for a time. Edward Meredith held the office of the High Sheriff of Denbighshire in 1629.

In 1709 the Plas Coch estate was sold by Sir William Meredith of Kent to Sir John Wynn, 1st Baronet of Gwydir Castle, Llanrwst.

The area now known as Plas Coch played an important part in the social life of Wrexham, hosting the Denbighshire & Flintshire Agricultural Society Show and the Annual Wrexham Lager Festival. The house and outbuildings were demolished in the late 1980s to make way for a large supermarket and retail development, as Plas Coch retail park. The only part of the original property remaining today is a short length of stone wall at the roadside in front of a branch of The Range. During the construction of the retail development in 1991, a hoard of Roman coins was discovered by workmen: however all of the coins subsequently disappeared. In 1995 further construction work on the site revealed traces of Roman field boundaries, hearths and a corn drying kiln.

== Geography ==
The borders of Plas Coch are loosely defined, but the area is regarded to be centred on Plas Coch Road, located between Stansty Road to the north, and Mold Road (A541) to the south, with the retail park and university campus, to the west and east respectively.

The area coined as "Plas Coch" neighbours the area of Stansty, also part of the community of Rhosddu, to the north, the Shrewsbury-Chester railway line to the east, Wrexham General railway station, the Racecourse Ground and Wrexham city centre, to the south-east, the community of Offa to the south, and the A483 and its bypass covering its west. The retail park on Berse Road in the community of Offa on the opposite side of Mold Road, home to DIY stores such as B&Q, is sometimes regarded as part of Plas Coch due to close proximity of both retail areas.

== About the area ==
Compared to the older city centre, Plas Coch is more modern, although less than the newer Eagles Meadow. The area is largely non-residential and is dominated by the Plas Coch campus of Wrexham University and its many sports facilities. Plas Coch is well known for its large retail park situated opposite the Wrexham Tennis Centre.

=== Wrexham University ===
The main campus of Wrexham University is located in the Plas Coch area. It was inherited from the former Cartrefle TTC which moved there in 1953, and is a mixture of Grade II listed buildings and modern 21st century facilities. The campus currently houses, in addition to the main university building, the Edward Llwyd Centre (the main library for the campus), a sports centre, Centre for the Creative Industries, Centre for the Child, Family and Society, Racecourse Stadium, Terry Hands studio, Catrin Finch Centre, William Aston Hall and Oriel Sycharth Gallery. The site formerly hosted Techniquest Glyndŵr, a science discovery centre open to the public, which has since rebranded as Xplore! Science Discovery Centre and moved to Chester Street in the city centre.

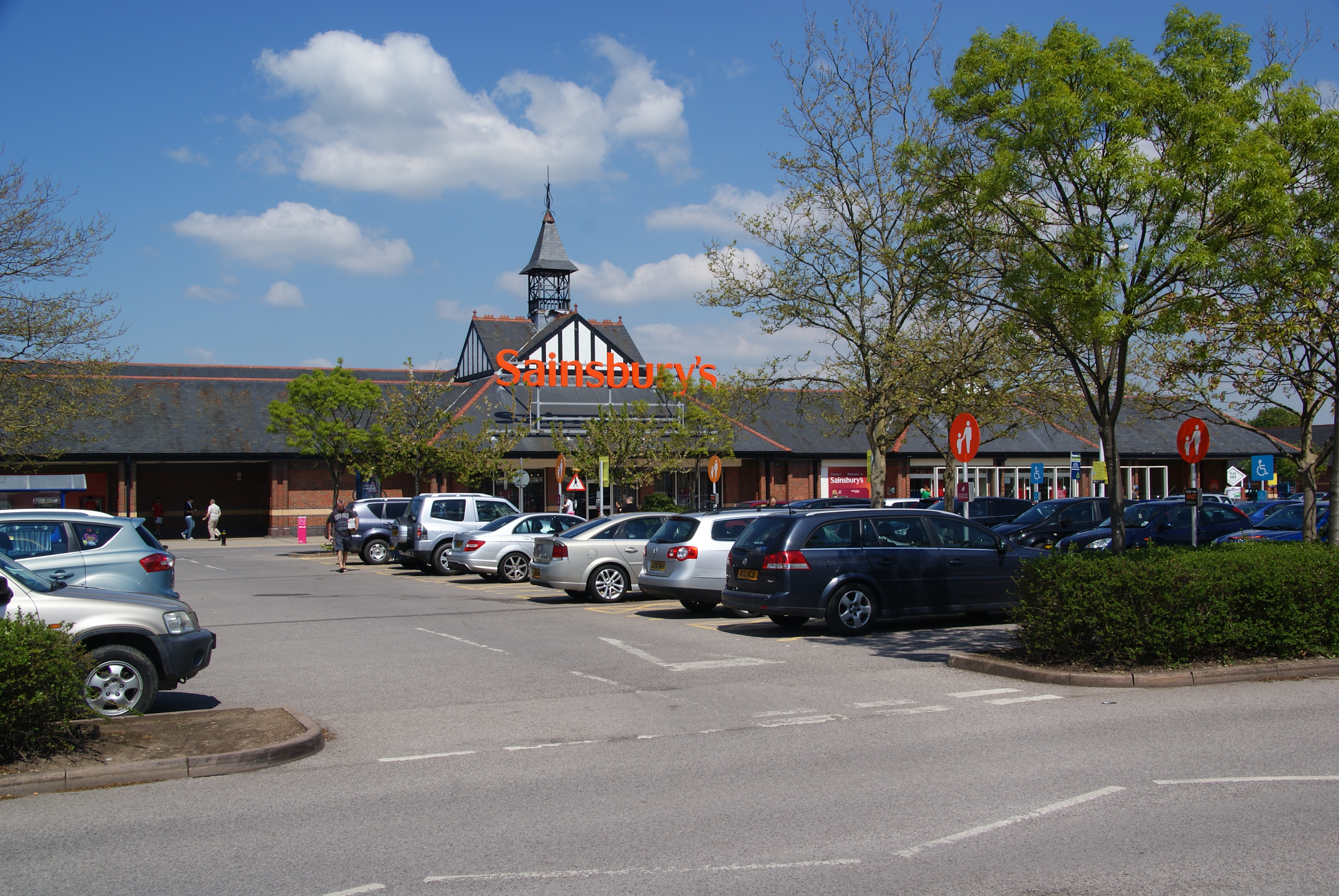
Sainsbury's located next to the retail park.

=== Plas Coch Retail Park ===
The development is home to: Boots, Card Factory, Costa Coffee, Currys, Marks and Spencer, Pets at Home and TK Maxx.

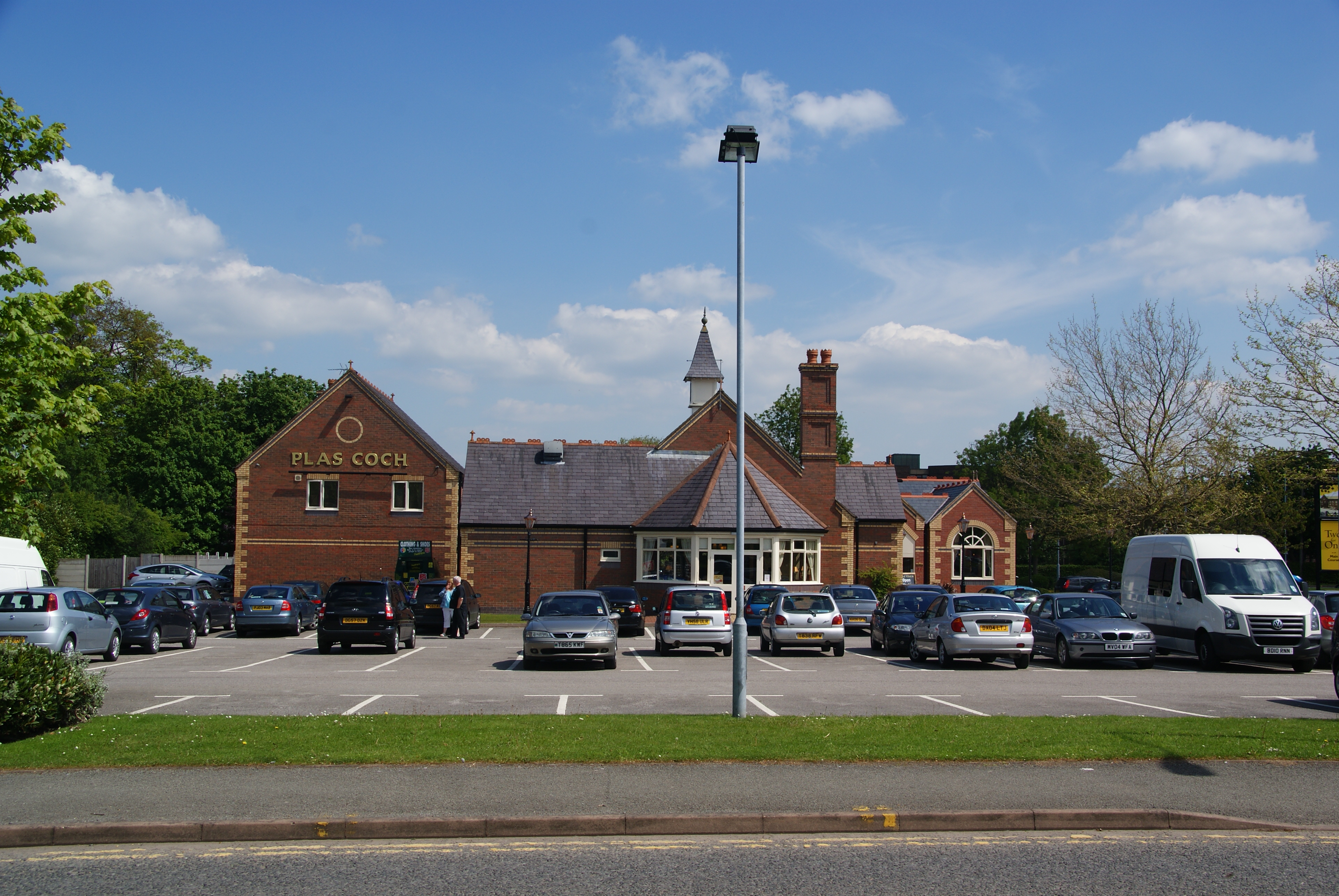
The Plas Coch pub

There is an adjacent Sainsbury's superstore, which also contains an Argos store, as well as a cafe and petrol station. There is also an Aldi, Farmfoods and The Range (with Iceland Foods) adjacent.

A Marston's pub known as "The Plas Coch" situated on what is thought to be the old Roman farm, is also located within the area.

=== Adjacent areas ===
Areas sometimes considered Plas Coch include: Berse Retail Park, and the Racecourse Ground Stadium - home to Wrexham AFC and part of Wrexham University's Plas Coch Campus.

Areas further afar, neighbouring Plas Coch include: Wrexham Technology Park, and Wrexham Maelor Hospital to the south.

== Schools ==
- Ysgol Plas Coch
