= Tŷ Pawb =

Arts centre in Wrexham, Wales

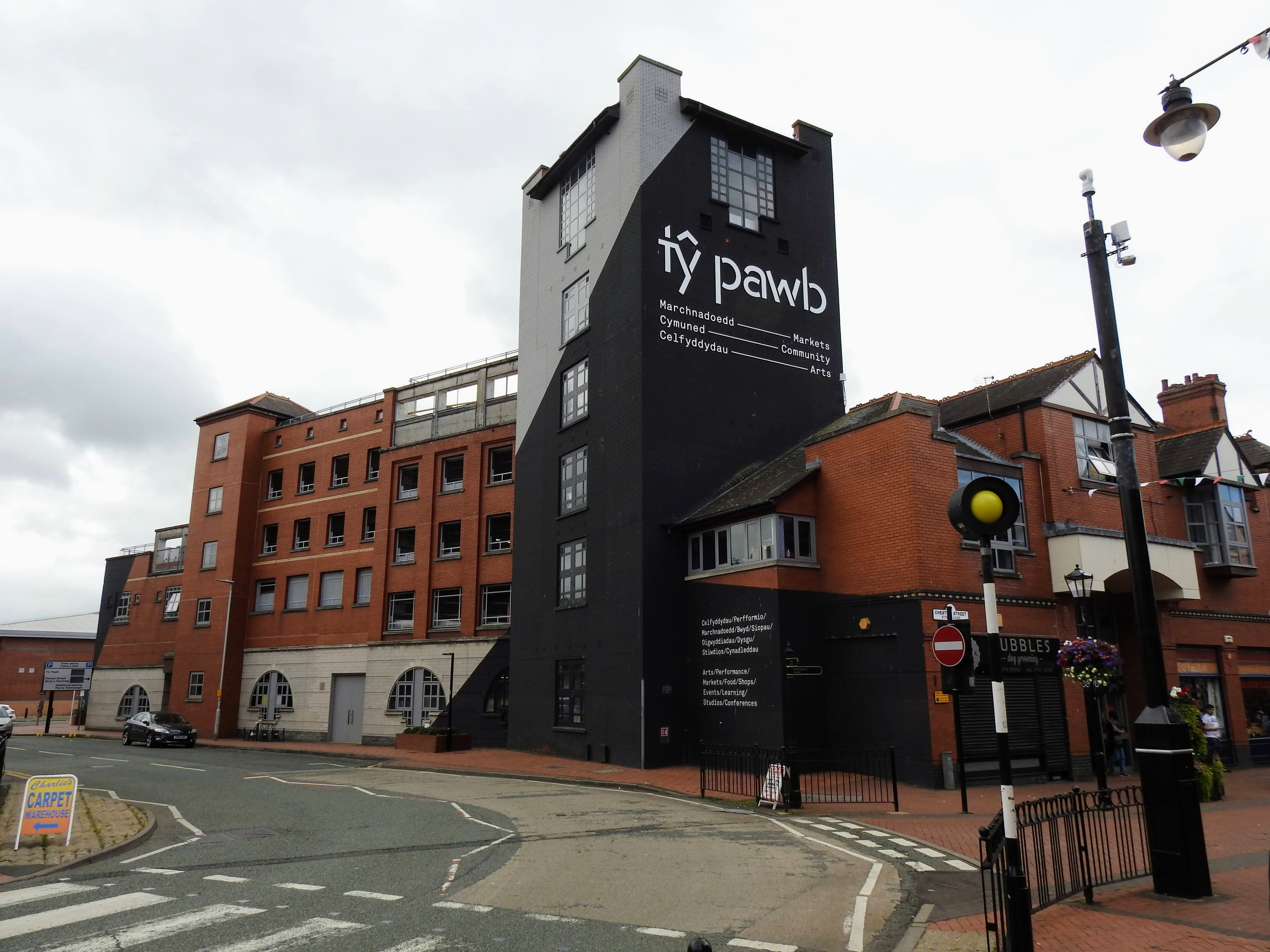
- The building from Chester Street
- Interactive map of the Tŷ Pawb area
- Former names: Wrexham People's Market; Wrexham Indoor Market
- Etymology: Welsh for 'Everybody's House'.

General information
- Type: Arts centre, gallery, community centre and market
- Architectural style: Postmodernism
- Location: Wrexham, Wrexham County Borough, Wales, United Kingdom
- Coordinates: 53.0465°N 2.9909°W
- Completed: 1992 (as People's Market); April 2018 for re-development
- Renovated: February 2017–April 2018
- Renovation cost: £4.3 million
- Client: Wrexham County Borough Council; Arts Council of Wales; Oriel Wrecsam
- Owner: Wrexham County Borough Council

Technical details
- Floor count: 5
- Floor area: 3,705 square metres (39,880 sq ft)

Renovating team
- Architect: Sarah Featherstone
- Renovating firm: Featherstone Young
- Civil engineer: Civic (stage 1–3) and Haltec (stage 4–5)
- Other designers: Tim Denton (Artist/furniture); Elfen (graphics)
- Quantity surveyor: Stockdale (stage 1–3) and SP Projects (stage 4–5)
- Main contractor: Wynne Construction

Other information
- Number of restaurants: 5 (shared food court)
- Facilities: art gallery, marketplace, performance space, learning centre, cafes, bars, artist studios, meeting rooms
- Parking: Multistorey car park
- Public transit: Market Street bus stop near Wrexham bus station

Website
- typawb.wales

Tŷ Pawb (Welsh pronunciation: [tɨ pau̯b]; lit. 'everybody's house') (Note: alternatively translated as "everyone's house".) is an arts centre in Wrexham, Wales. It serves as a venue for arts, cultural and community events, as well as being a market and art gallery. A redevelopment of the former Wrexham People's Market (Welsh: Marchnad y Bobl) between Chester Street and Market Street in Wrexham city centre, the community centre opened on 2 April 2018. It provides exhibitions, a gallery, a food court, small stage concerts and live events, as well as a market space for local traders and the relocation of Oriel Wrecsam. A multi-storey car park is located on top of Tŷ Pawb, on the building's upper floors.

== Overview ==
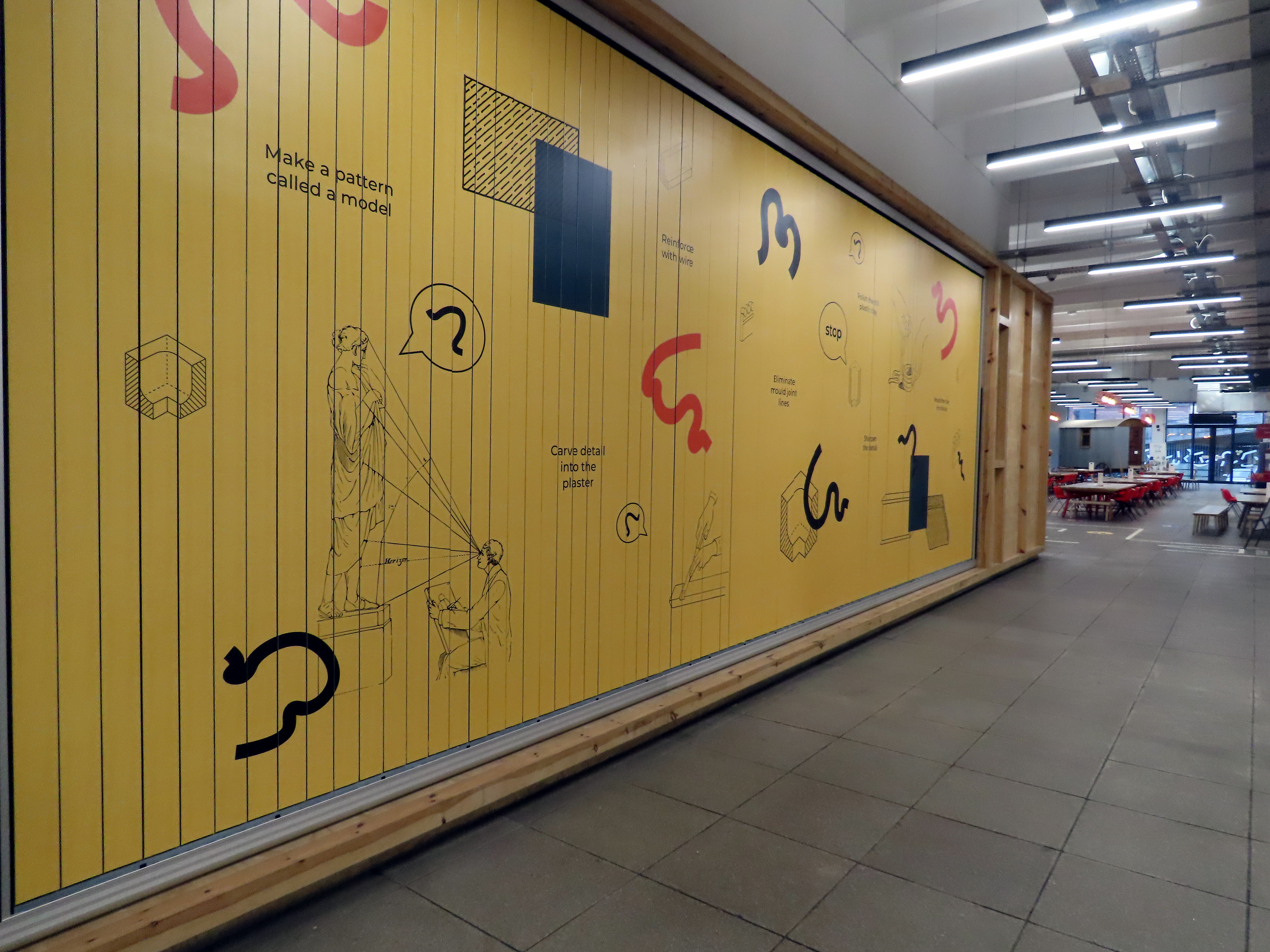
Wal Pawb ("Everybody's Wall") at Tŷ Pawb

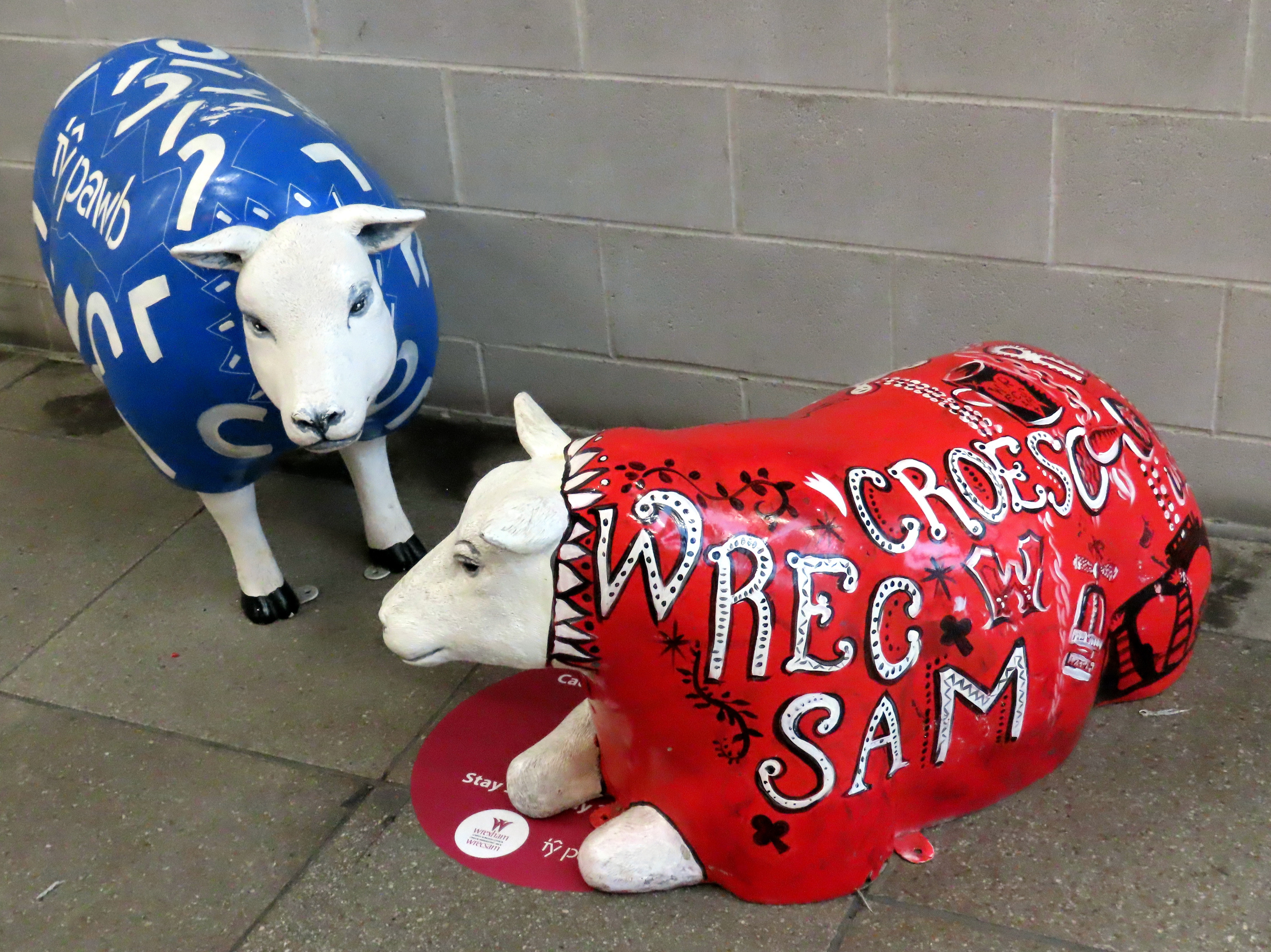
Sheep sculptures in the centre

The building contains art galleries (Gallery 1 and Gallery 2), market stalls, performance space (including a 104-seat theatre), a learning centre, cafés, bars, studios and meeting rooms. It is one of the top venues for contemporary visual art and applied arts in Wales.

The centre hosts as one of the venues of Focus Wales, an annual music festival held in Wrexham. Wal Pawb (Welsh for 'Everybody's Wall') is a large, revolving billboard advertising various selected artworks located in the building. Sgwâr y Bobl (Welsh for 'the People's Square') is an indoor public square at the centre of the building serving as an innovation area for arts, market and community users. The square was designed using a concept of "baggy space", utilising translucent heavy industrial plastic sheets suspended on rails, equivalent to curtains, which allow for the square to be easily divided between concurrent events hosted in Sgwâr y Bobl.

== History ==
The site previously was home to a house known as Tŷ Meredith, which behind it (where the modern performance areas stand) was a bank opened in c. 1785, later becoming the Wrexham & North Wales Bank, until it collapsed in 1849. Nearby there were also narrow lanes and by 1833 a coach works. The site was later home to the Wrexham Corn Mills, established here in the 1890s and comprising a complex of brick warehouses, later converted into offices and wholesale premises. It was knocked down in 1990 for the People's Market development.

=== People's Market ===
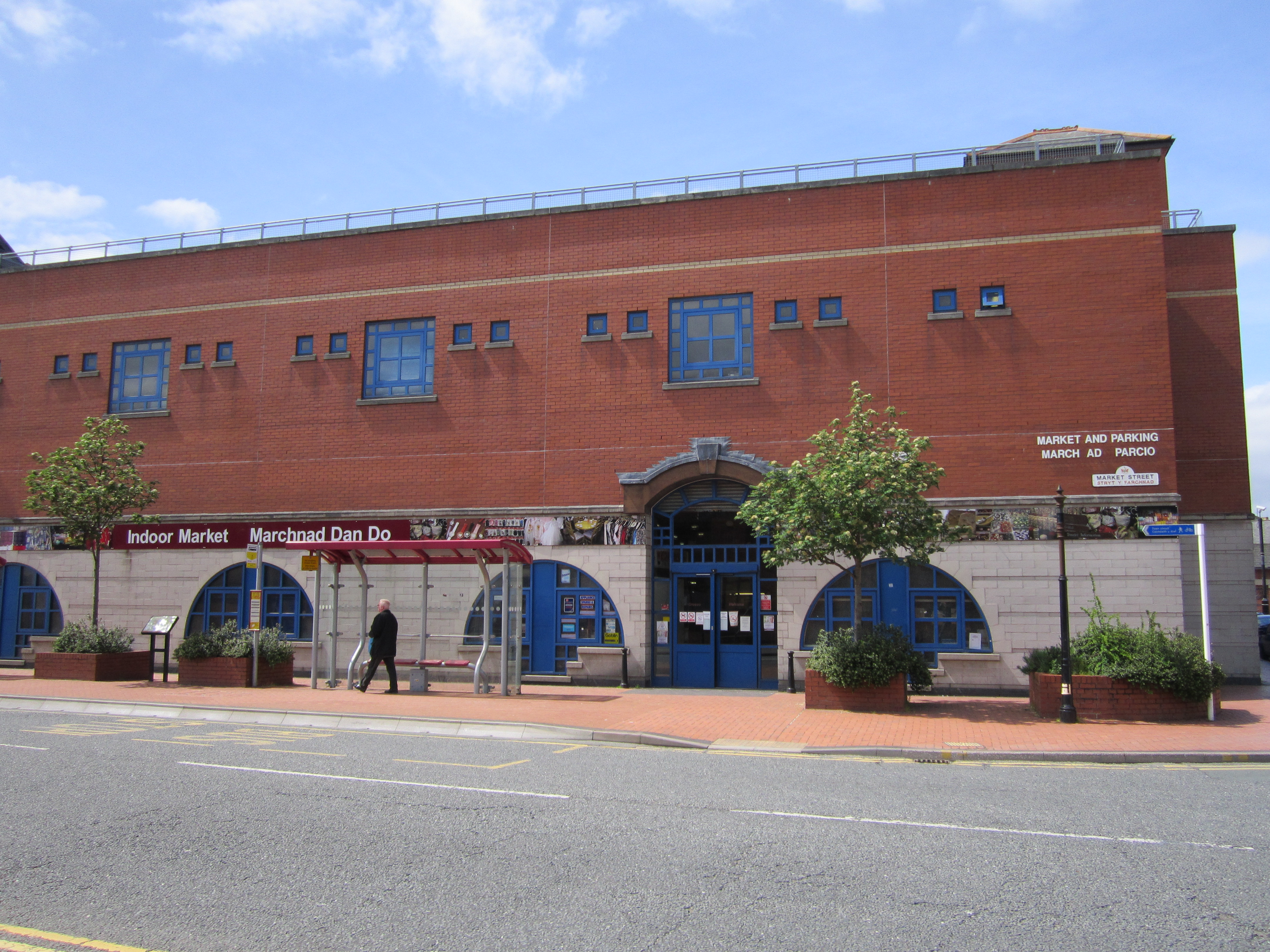
Exterior of the building as the Wrexham Indoor Market in 2013, before redevelopment

The People's Market was built in 1992 as part of a redevelopment of Wrexham, and was the newest of the pre-existing indoor markets in Wrexham, alongside the Butcher's and General Markets. The market replaced Wrexham's Vegetable Market established in 1898. The naming of the market as the "People's Market" was criticised as the term was linked to communism. A local rumour is that it was coined for a visiting Chinese delegation. It had roughly 30 stalls including clothing, makeup, furniture, book and carpet stalls. A multi-storey car park was constructed in the building's upper four floors, whereas the market occupied one floor at ground level. The layout was said to represent the trends toward car-accessible shopping at the time. The building, alongside the neighbouring Henblas Square development, was built in a "severely diluted" commercial postmodernist design, with the People's Market building having mannered, semi-circular windows and a brick-covered exterior. Both developments saw excessive vacant space within their units due to the attraction of out-of-town retail areas near the A483 dual carriageway, as well as not being a core part of the historic city centre.

=== Redevelopment ===
The £4.5 million market and arts development involves a refurbishment of the building, adding two galleries, performance areas, a gallery shop and market stalls. The redevelopment was funded by the Welsh Government, the Arts Council of Wales, and Wrexham County Borough Council.

The plans, first announced in December 2015, were approved in principle on 6 January 2016, and then formally approved on 12 January 2016, with the centre expected to be double the size of the existing Oriel Wrecsam (lit. 'Wrexham Gallery'; formerly Wrexham Arts Centre) in Wrexham Library. Oriel Wrecsam later relocated into Tŷ Pawb, following a brief "Siop//Shop" shop on Chester Street.

Concerns over the cost, available funding and location of the project were expressed by some councillors. Traders stated the market has suffered from a lack of long-term investment and the arts hub plans scared away new potential traders to the market. Plans of the redevelopment initially showed a 10-year £900,000 loss, rising to £2.1 million if Arts Council of Wales funding could not be secured, although supporters of the project stated that such cost was the "price as [a] nation we pay for our heritage and our arts and our culture", likening it to the cost of the education system. The centre was expected to be overseen by a "new entity, likely a new 'Arts Trust'", and the parking charge expected to be doubled.

The redevelopment was designed by Sarah Featherstone of Featherstone Young and won the Royal Society of Architects in Wales Welsh Architecture Award 2021. With Wynne Construction as contractors. Simple black streaks were applied to the building's exterior due to budget restraints. One of the upper-floor parking areas, the "mayor's garage" on the first floor above ground level, was the only car parking area whose removal was permitted. The removal of this area, located above the building's entrance from Market Street, allowed for a double-height ceiling in some parts of the building, and for the construction of upper-floor small offices and studios.

It was initially expected that trading would continue side-by-side with construction work; however, in December 2016, the council U-turned on the policy, announcing that the market would be closed during redevelopment.

On 6 January 2017, traders in the People's Market started moving out to allow for construction, with all moved out by 9 January 2017, including some to the Butcher's Market. Ten stallholders were present in the market at the time, with some relocating out of the market or closing permanently. The Guardian reported that historically spending on arts in the city has led to opposition from market traders fearing they'd be pushed out, with a poster placed at one point stating "Art for a minority! … If they want Art they go to places like CHESTER". Therefore, the continued presence of a marketplace in the building "was essential to the project's case". Initial redevelopment works started on 19 January 2017.

On 12 September 2017, a public vote selected the "Tŷ Pawb", meaning 'Everybody's House' or 'Everyone's House' in Welsh, as a name for the development. The other two options were "Cartref" (transl. 'Home') and "Oriel M" (lit. transl. 'Gallery M').

In November 2017, an old large Art Deco light, formerly hung from the ceiling of the old Wrexham Hippodrome cinema on Henblas Street, closed in 1997, was hung up on Tŷ Pawb's South Arcade.

The centre opened on Easter Monday, styled as "Dydd Llun Pawb" (transl. 'Everybody's Monday'), 2 April 2018; the former Oriel gallery in the Wrexham Library was later converted to a local police station.

=== Recent history ===
Although Tŷ Pawb was officially opened in April 2018, some construction work continued into June 2018, with traders offered a 30% rent discount by the council for the disruption caused by construction.

From opening in April 2018 to December 2018, it was reported that the centre received 53,000 visitors but a predicted £173,00 deficit, with £139,600 paid using the council's arts budget.

Between 2018 and 2020, an average of 85% of the units in the centre were occupied.

In August 2019, the centre won the Gold Medal for Architecture at the National Eisteddfod of Wales.

In June 2021, it was announced that the centre would remain council-run for a further three years at minimum, due to the COVID-19 pandemic hitting the centre's revenue from parking fees and venue hire charges. The centre was initially expected to be passed onto a trust, as had been advised by consultants.

On 10 May 2022, the centre was shortlisted as one of the final four nominees for the Art Fund Museum of the Year. It was described as "one of the most unusual" candidates in the competition, but was also praised for its "unique resilience". Shortlisted bids receive £15,000. It lost the award to the Horniman Museum, London.

In July 2022, it was reported that the council-run centre overall was running at a loss of £111,000 for the 2021/2022 financial year, although the arts programme was "very successful" in grant applications and the arts programme was self-sufficient and funded. Issues over the short trading hours of market traders in the centre were discussed among councillors in a council committee meeting. Many of the traders in the centre are sole traders and the market had an 85% occupancy rate, though there was a waiting list of potential traders. Car park income and increases in repair and maintenance costs were additional reasons stated for high expenditure, as were a reduction in venue hire charges, although future forecasts of the centre's finances were described as being "a lot more favourable". Council-run car parks in Wrexham city centre operate a free-of-charge policy after 11 am following lockdown; a councillor stated that from a "Ty Pawb perspective [this] has impacted on income", with alternative uses for the building's car park, the energy efficiency of the car park/galleries and increased sponsorship/advertising mentioned as a possible response. Car park occupancy levels decreased by more than 50%, decreasing from 85% to 40%, whereas yearly visitor levels decreased to 281,000 from a pre-pandemic figure of 500,000 in the 2019/2020 financial year. Despite Tŷ Pawb's running at a loss, councillors stated that its finances are an improvement from those of the former People's Market.

In January 2024, the centre was stated to face a projected yearly cost of £280,000, with £200,000 hoped to be covered by Arts Council Wales funding. The cost was blamed on footfall still not returning to pre-pandemic levels, general increase in costs relating to inflation and the cost-of-living crisis, and the excessive amounts of energy the building requires, one of the highest among council buildings. The amounts of energy were tied to its concrete structure, poor insulation and the atmospheric control used in Gallery 1, as well as the car park's roof and the centre's boiler. Repair costs for 2022 and 2023 had to be increased to cover 5-year repair works during that period. The council announced they would be implementing measures to cut the costs with the building and increase revenue, particularly with its car park. Councillors later expressed their concerns with the finances of the centre.

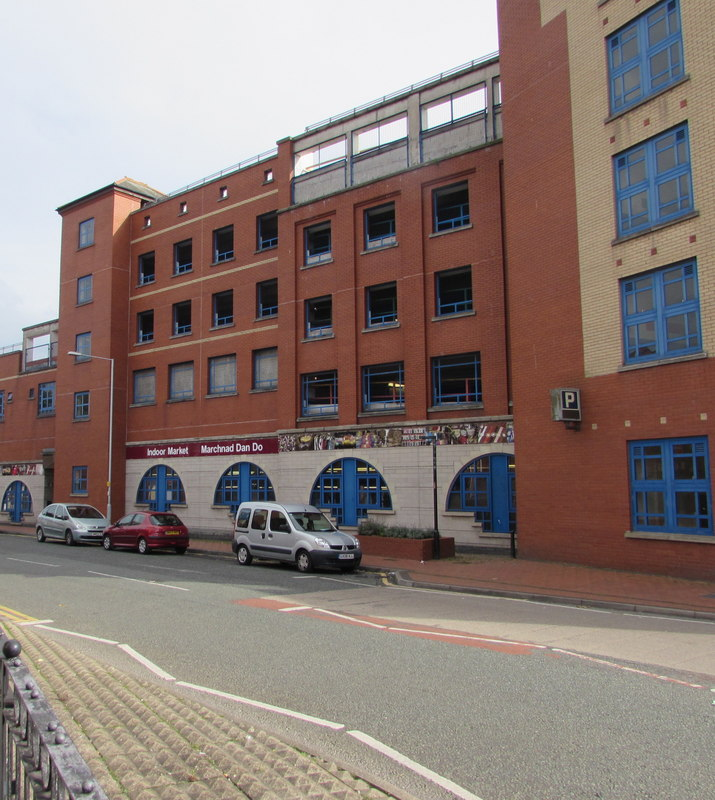
The building as the Indoor Market, with the upper floors for car parking.

== Arts projects and exhibitions ==
Various touring exhibitions are hosted in the centre's gallery, such as exhibitions themed on the Battle of Britain and gypsy/roma travellers. As well as locally inspired exhibitions.

In 2021, Tŷ Pawb hosted the "Make Yourself at Home" arts project, increasing the arts and crafts skills of local refugees and asylum seekers.

A radio transmitter was installed on top of the building to increase the reach of Calon FM, a local community radio station.

On 27 November 2021, the centre served as a venue for VOD Music's records fair, a touring fair in North Wales since 2006, providing a choice of thousands of vinyl records and CDs across 30 stalls. The event returned to the centre again in April 2022.

In 2022, the centre would host in its "Useful Art Space" (Lle Celf Ddefnyddiol), a multi-cultural hub hosting various activities such as arts, music, and cuisine led by the diverse communities present in Wrexham, supported by Race Council Cymru and funding from the Arts Council of Wales.

On July 3rd 2026, Ty pawb opened Degree Show: Wrexham School of Art containing art from their graduating years including Applied arts, Fine arts, Design and Photography.
