= TJ Hughes =

British discount department store brand

LHR Holding Limited
- Type: Private
- Industry: Retail
- Genre: Department Store
- Founded: 1912; 114 years ago
- Founder: Thomas J Hughes
- Headquarters: Liverpool
- Number of locations: 16 (2025)
- Products: Home furnishing, menswear, women's wear, perfume, electricals, toys
- Owner: Right Inc Limited (49%); Anil Juneja (49%)
- Website: tjhughes.co.uk

LHR Holding Limited, trading as TJ Hughes, is a British discount department store brand which first emerged in Liverpool in 1912.

Founded by Thomas John Hughes on Liverpool's London Road after an apprenticeship with Owen Owen, eventually partnering with Owen Owen in 1925, which allowed him to expand the store into a department store. The business grew under Owen Owen's ownership until it was sold in 1990.

In the 1990s and 2000s, TJ Hughes expanded significantly by acquiring locations from other retailers and continued to grow into the 2010s. However, in March 2011, the company was sold to turnaround firm Endless LLP after financial struggles, including the loss of credit insurance for suppliers. The business had grown to become a national chain with 57 stores but shrank to just six locations after entering administration in June 2011.

In recent years, the chain has opened and closed various sites and, as of 2025, trades from 16 stores, as well as online.

== History ==
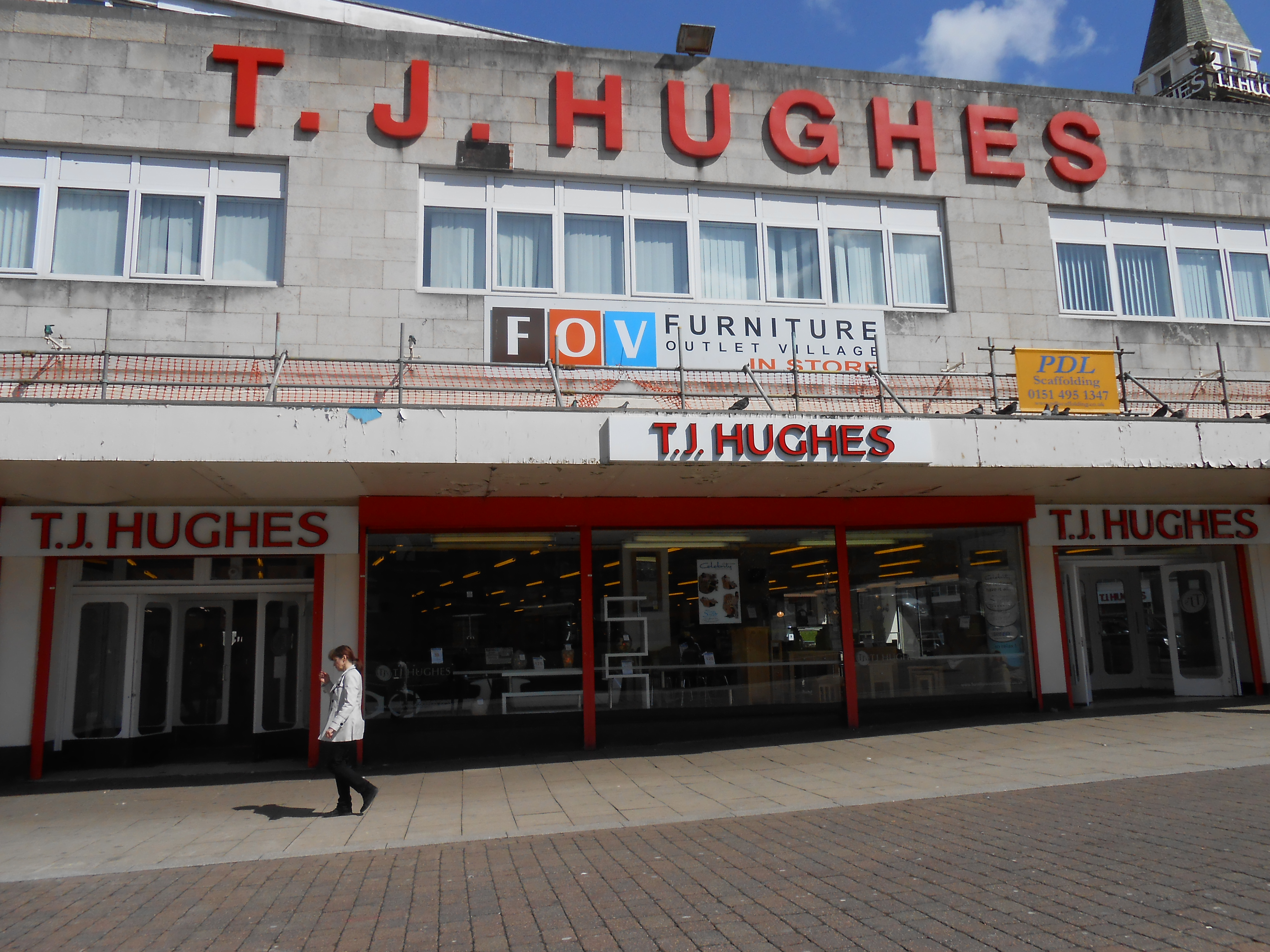
TJ Hughes shop in Liverpool

=== Establishment ===
Thomas John Hughes set up a small shop on Liverpool's London Road after an apprenticeship at fellow drapery firm Owen Owen. The store had a few assistants and Hughes was the main shopkeeper, overseeing everything within the business.

In 1925 Owen Owen saw the need to move out of their Audley House site on London Road into the new centre of Liverpool at Clayton Square. The then chairman of Owen Owen, Duncan Norman, went to see the TJ Hughes shop. Norman was so impressed that he agreed to let Hughes run and expand his business in Audley House for part ownership of the business under Owen Owen.

After 65 years of ownership by the Owen Owen group, TJ Hughes was de-merged in 1990. The initial four locations (Liverpool, Birkenhead, Bootle and St Helens) were shortly joined by two ex Owen Owen stores; Wolverhampton in 1991 and Kidderminster in 1992.

TJ Hughes was floated on the London Stock Exchange in May 1992 before being acquired by JJB Sports in March 2002 for £42 million. In November 2003, the company was sold again in a £56 million buyout backed by PPM Capital.

During the 1990s and 2000s, TJ Hughes took over a number of premises formerly occupied by other retailers including Allders (Ipswich, Redditch), C&A (Glasgow, Romford and Hull), House of Fraser (Sheffield and Eastbourne) and Co-operative Group (Warrington, Bradford, Doncaster and Crawley). From 2009, expansion picked up again with the addition of a further seven stores. A number of these openings were in locations left vacant by Woolworths which had collapsed in late 2008.

In March 2011, TJ Hughes was sold to turnaround specialist Endless LLP for an undisclosed sum. Endless bought TJ Hughes from Silverfleet Capital, who had overseen growth of around twenty stores since taking control of the firm in 2003. The sale followed reports that TJ Hughes had been hit by the withdrawal of credit insurance for its suppliers after a battle to secure working capital.

=== 2011 administration ===
On 27 June 2011, TJ Hughes Limited announced that it intended to go into administration, putting 4,000 jobs at risk. TJ Hughes officially entered administration on Thursday 30 June 2011, with Ernst & Young appointed as administrators. The company launched a closing down sale in a bid to reduce stock levels.

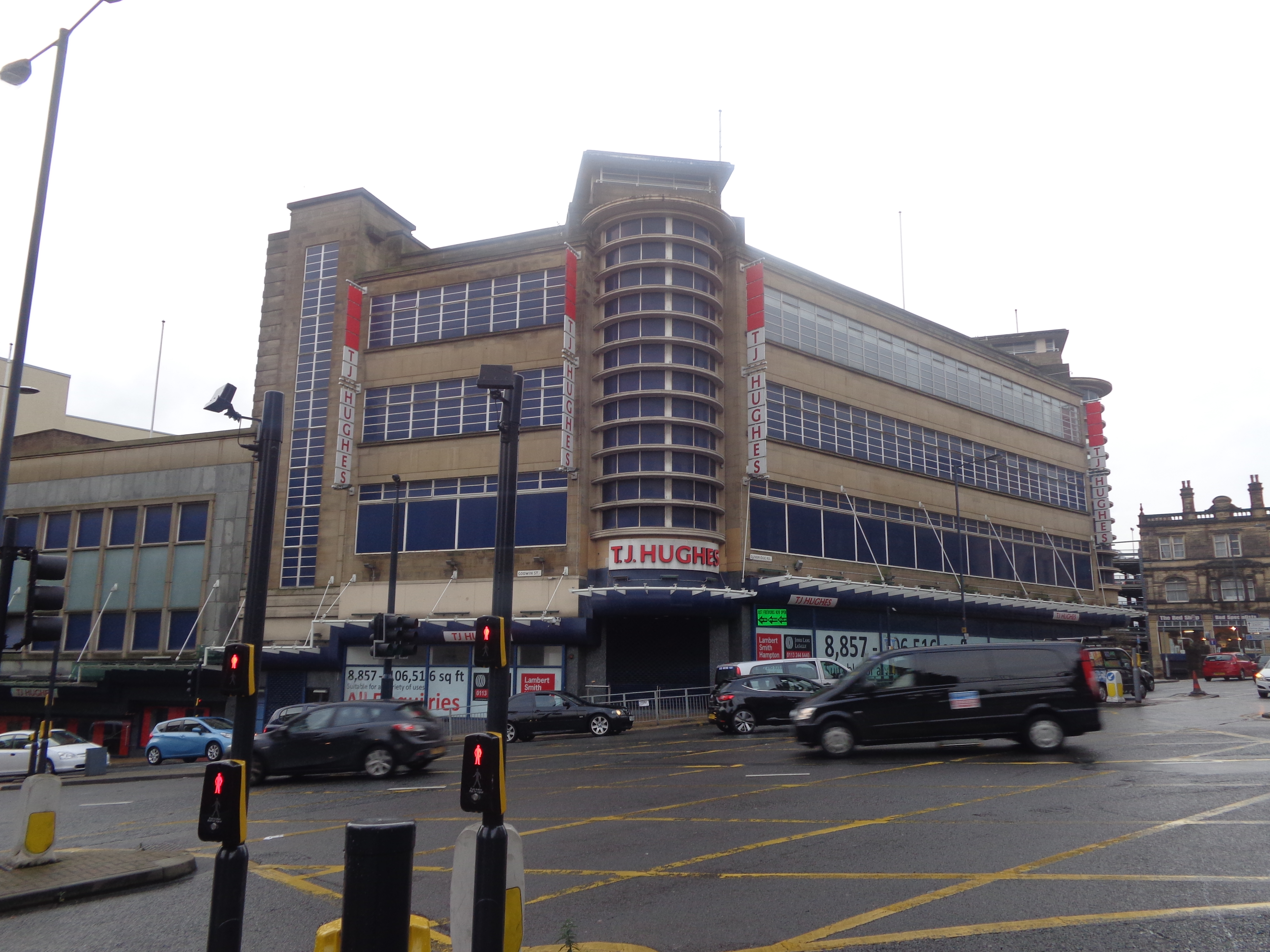
A closed branch of TJ Hughes in Bradford

Ernst & Young said it hoped to sell the company as a going concern, saying it was "very much business as usual" but added that it could be difficult to sell all of the stores owing to the previous trading history of TJ Hughes. There were reports of a number of prospective buyers, including Primark.

On 7 July 2011, GA Europe acquired Endless’ secured debt due from TJ Hughes and announced plans to work with administrators Ernst & Young to liquidate stock from the retail chain's 57 stores.

On 22 July, Ernst & Young announced the company's Liverpool distribution centre would close, making 116 employees redundant.

On 1 August, Lewis's Home Retail, a company associated with Speke-based Benross Group, acquired the TJ Hughes brand and website together with the flagship Liverpool store as well as the Eastbourne, Glasgow and Sheffield locations. This was shortly followed by the Newcastle and Widnes stores, bringing the total saved to six.

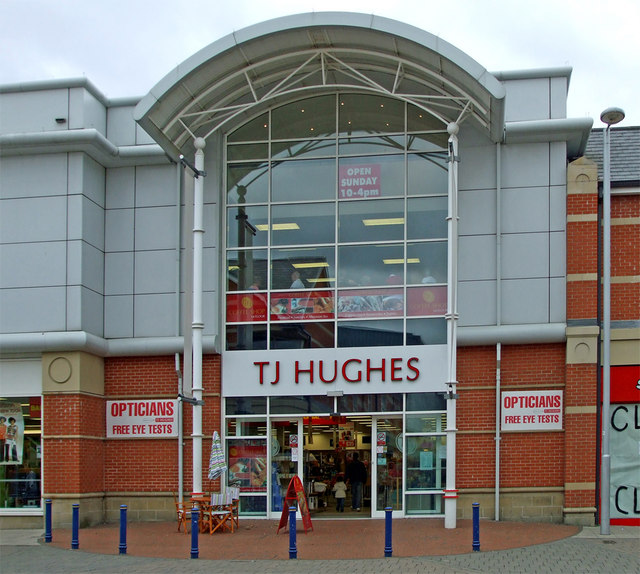
Former TJ Hughes shop in Scunthorpe

On 4 August, Ernst & Young announced the closure of the first twenty two unsold TJ Hughes stores throughout the United Kingdom. Store closures began on 10 August, with Shrewsbury closing first.

Ernst & Young announced on 20 August that the remainder of the 51 unsold TJ Hughes stores would close their doors by 31 August 2011.

=== Post–2011 ===
Since emerging from administration of the legacy company in 2011, TJ Hughes has operated a number of different stores. The Company stated in 2015 that it may seek to open as many as 55 stores in total, by 2019 reaching 29, including several in locations formerly occupied by BHS and Toys-R-Us. By early 2020 however, seven stores had closed followed by a further nine in the aftermath of the COVID-19 pandemic. Over the years, some closures have related to lease expiry or urban regeneration, with a number closing without replacement in the same town/city (e.g. Widnes), others relocating immediately to nearby premises (e.g. St Helens), and some re-emerging in new premises several years after closure (e.g. Middlesbrough).

Since the beginning of 2023 the number of TJ Hughes stores has returned to growth, with five new branches and re-location of another two, including a move from the company's original London Road home to a new Central Liverpool location.

== Sales strategy ==
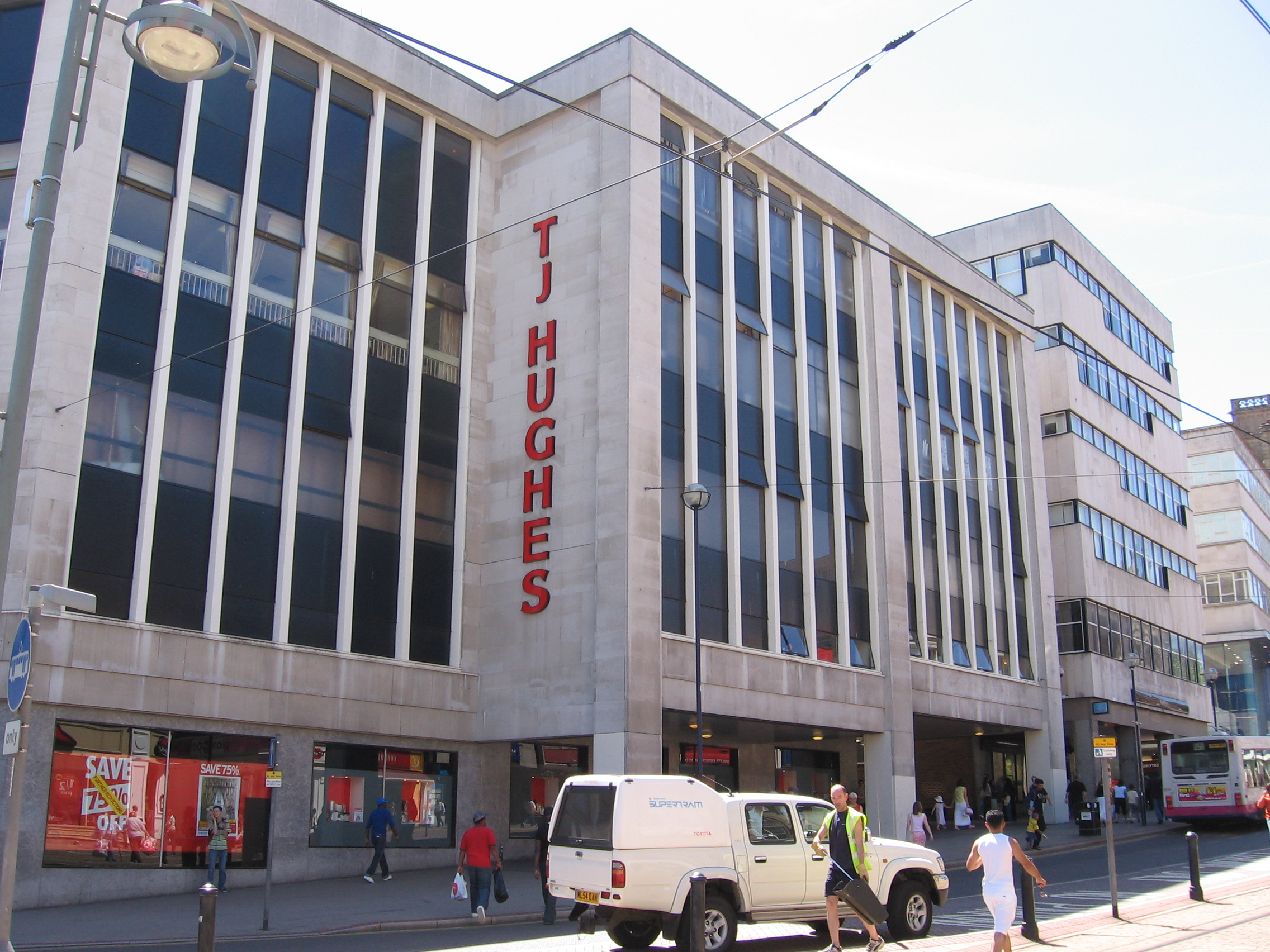
Former TJ Hughes shop in Sheffield

In December 2005, TJ Hughes launched an online store through eBay, with eBay claiming that the retailer was the first in the United Kingdom to sell its main products through the auction site. The store launched with 110 lines including DVD players, digital cameras and perfumes. TJ Hughes said its eBay shop represented an opportunity to increase sales and brand awareness.

One of the retailer's advertising tactics was to feature relatives of famous celebrities in their advertisements. For example, they used former Manchester United F.C. player Wayne Rooney's brother Graeme Rooney as part of an advertising campaign.

== Online ==
TJ Hughes was a late runner in the e-commerce era, establishing an information website for investors and customers in 1999/2000. Although a new site was launched in 2004, this continued to offer only basic information such as current offers and store locations. In spite of this, the company reported that this site received some 17,000 hits a month, which prompted them to look at the introduction of e commerce.

This was introduced on a trial basis in the run up to Christmas 2005, and offered 150 seasonal gifts and homewares lines.

An encouraging performance resulted in the trial being extended, with the company subsequently increasing the range of merchandise offered online, and by 2011 the company offered an extensive range of products on its website. The TJ Hughes website, designed by local digital agency YOMA, was ranked 108,004 worldwide and 5,237 in the United Kingdom according to Alexa.

== Financial success ==
TJ Hughes saw gross profits soar almost 50% a year, from £3.6m in 2003, increasing to £7.9m in 2004 with a jump to £12m in 2006. Throughout 2007, TJ Hughes's pre-tax profits were £5.1 million in the year to 26 January, up from £1.2 million the year before. Operating profit soared 299 per cent to £2.9 million.

In January 2010, accounts showed pre-tax profits increased by more than £1.5m to £6.8m. That was achieved on sales of £266.7m, an annualised rise of 4%. Although the last full financial year before Ms Tennant was appointed, to January 2007, showed pre tax profits of £1.2m, they rose to £5.1m in the year to January 2008. This was followed by profits of £5.3m the following year.

== Competition ==
The demise of Woolworths was seen to create significant opportunities in the homewares market, although other mixed goods discounters such as B&M and Wilko, which have some overlap in terms of product offer, have also been expanding rapidly in a bid to gain some of this market share both on the high street and increasingly in out of town locations. This is believed to be part of the reason as to why T. J. Hughes entered administration.

American retailer TJ Maxx, which also sells discounted clothing and housewares, modified its name to TK Maxx to avoid confusion with T. J. Hughes when it opened its first British store in 1994. It subsequently used the TK Maxx name for its other European operations.
