= Carnegie libraries in Wales =

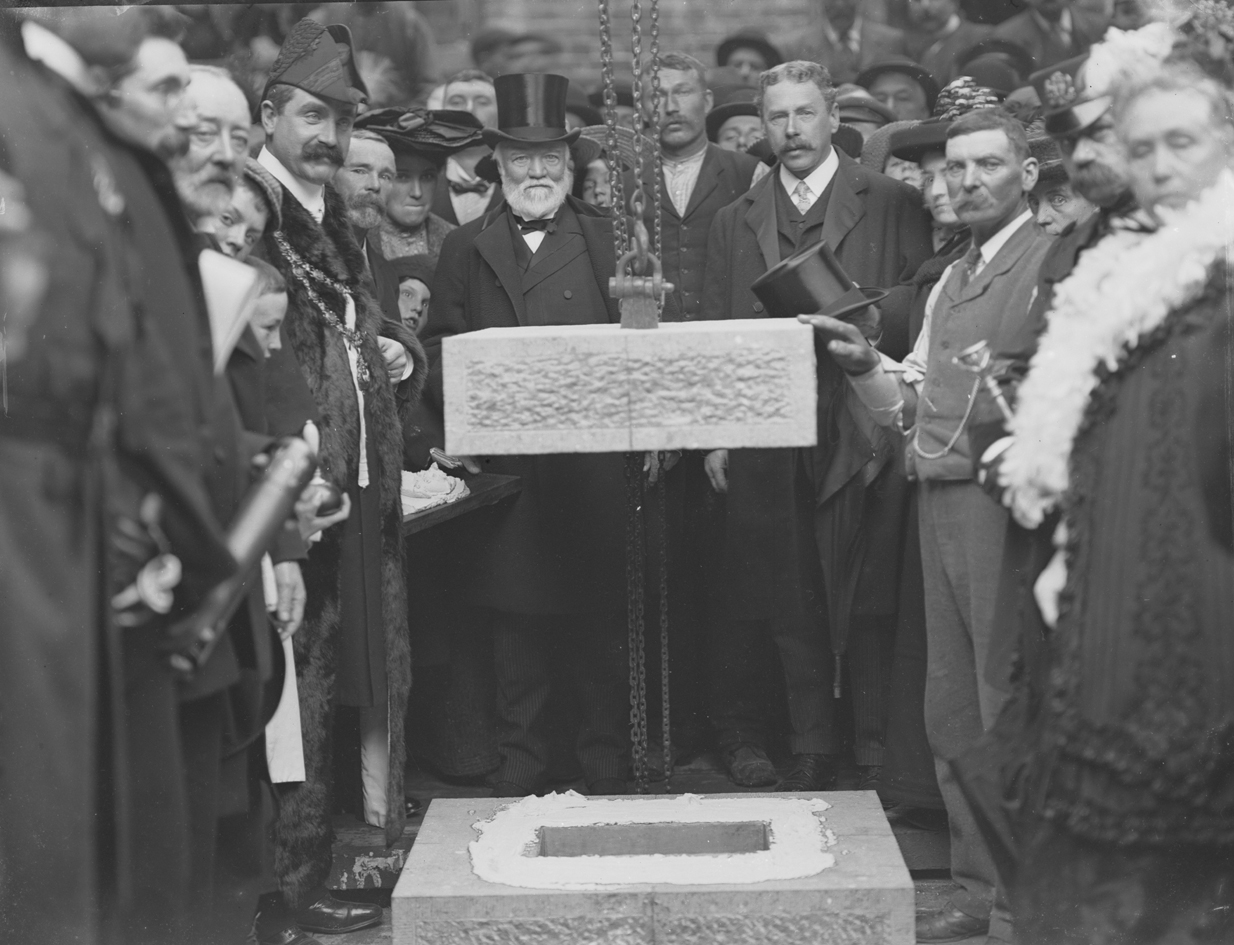
Andrew Carnegie laying the foundation stone of the Waterford Free Library in Ireland in 1903

Carnegie libraries were the inspiration of the Scottish-American steel magnate Andrew Carnegie. Born in Scotland in 1835, Carnegie emigrated to the United States of America in 1848 and amassed a huge fortune through his creation and direction of the Carnegie Steel Company. Selling out to US Steel in 1901, Carnegie set about dispersing some 90% of his personal fortune, estimated at $480m, following the philanthropic doctrine he had developed and publicised in his essay, The Gospel of Wealth. As part of this endeavour, between 1883 and 1929, Carnegie's foundation deployed some $40m to fund the construction of some 2,500 libraries worldwide.

Some 35 such libraries were established in Wales. (Note: John B. Hilling, in his study, The Architecture of Wales: From the First to the Twenty-First Centuries suggests that 17 such libraries were built in Wales. Other sources suggest a number just over double this.) (Note: Andrew Carnegie's efforts were not the earliest example of libraries in Wales being established through philanthropic endeavour. Lady Charlotte Guest had opened a library at Dowlais in memory of her husband John Josiah Guest in 1863.) The provision of libraries focussed heavily on the industrialised, urban areas, such as the South Wales Valleys, and libraries in rural areas are rare. Grants were reliant on matched funding and local authorities were obliged to demonstrate that they could cover the costs of stocking the libraries, and ensuring their ongoing staffing and maintenance. Carnegie Foundation grants were generally in the range of £2,000-£8,000, though they could be lower, sometimes in the hundreds of pounds if refurbishment of an existing building was intended, or higher. Grants were both refused and declined when offered; in the former instance when local councillors were unable or unwilling to match the foundation's funding; in the latter case when they objected to Carnegie as benefactor, "a man perceived to have gained so much wealth from the subjugation of working people for his own profit". (Note: An example of the opposition to receiving Carnegie's benefice was Alderman Nathan Griffiths of Llanelli; "I would not touch a single penny of the money of the man who employed mercenaries to shoot down my fellow-workers at Homestead".)

The, "often innovative", designs of the libraries varied greatly; from simple single-storey structures, to buildings of greater elaboration in a variety of styles, including Gothic Revival, neoclassical and Baroque Revival. The peak years for construction were 1903-1911, with far fewer buildings put up before this date, and a major slow-down from World War I until the ending of the programme in the 1930s.

Approximately two thirds of the libraries are listed buildings but the aim of the Carnegie Foundation to ensure economy and functionality rarely attracted any but local, often municipal, architects to compete with designs. Of the twenty-one which are listed, twenty are at the lowest grade, Grade II, while only one, Cathays Library achieves the middle grade, Grade II*. (Note: The architectural historian John Newman, in his Glamorgan volume in the Buildings of Wales series, described the building with enthusiasm; "Speir and Bevan exploited the site beautifully. The style [is] handled with exquisite delicacy".) Just under half of the libraries continue as local authority-operated public lending libraries, the purpose for which they were built. Of the remainder: some remain under public control, but have been repurposed; some have been sold and passed out of public control; and two have been demolished.

== List of Carnegie libraries in Wales ==
Name	Location	Principal area	Year	Listed/Grade	Architect	Current status	Notes	Reference	Image
Abercanaid Carnegie Library	Abercanaid	Merthyr Tydfil County Borough	1903	N		Demolished	Opened by Councillor Arthur Daniel with a speech that contrasted Andrew Carnegie's generosity with the parsimony of the area's local landowners and businessmen.		
Aberfan Old Library	Aberfan	Merthyr Tydfil County Borough	1910	N	T. F. Harvey	Redundant	Closed as a library in 2013. Used as a community centre.		
Abergavenny Carnegie Library	Abergavenny	Monmouthshire	1906	Grade II	B. J. Francis	Redundant	The library was closed in 2015. In 2024, the council announced plans to repurpose the building as a mosque, the first such place of worship in the county.		
Aberystwyth Carnegie Library	Aberystwyth	Ceredigion	1906	Grade II	Walter G. Payton	Closed	Closed as a library in 2012 and sold in 2016. Later converted to residential use.		
Bangor Carnegie Library	Bangor	Gwynedd	1907	Grade II	A. E. Dixon & C. H. Potter	Active	Continues to operate as a public lending library.		
Barry Council Office and Library	Barry	Vale of Glamorgan	1906	Grade II	Charles E Hutchinson and E Harding Payne	Active	The library occupies the block to the right of the clock tower. Opened on Saint David's Day by the Earl of Plymouth. Continues to operate as a public lending library.		
Carnegie House, Bridgend	Bridgend	Bridgend County Borough	1907	Grade II		Inactive as a library	Former Old Library now Carnegie House (2014), Council Offices and Arts/Culture Hub.		
Brynmawr and District Museum	Brynmawr	Blaenau Gwent	1906	N	F. R. Bates	Inactive as a library	The library was closed at the end of the 20th century, and reopened as a local history museum in the early 21st century.		
Buckley Town Council Offices and Library	Buckley	Flintshire	1902	Grade II	Richard Cecil Davies	Inactive as a library	The library was relocated in 1977 and the building is now used exclusively as the town hall.		
Canton Library	Canton	Cardiff	1906	Grade II	R. M. Bruce Vaughan	Active	As at 2025, the site continues as a council-operated community lending library.		
Cathays Library	Cathays	Cardiff	1907	Grade II*	Speir & Bevan	Active	The only Carnegie library in Wales with a Grade II* listing, the "butterfly" plan was one of the earliest of its type in the country. As at 2025, the site continues as a council-operated community lending library.		
Church Village Parish Hall	Church Village	Rhondda Cynon Taf	1906	Grade II		Inactive as a library	In use as the parish hall since the 1960s.		
Coedffranc Carnegie Hall	Coedffranc, Skewen	Neath Port Talbot	1905	N	J. Cook Rhys	Active	As at 2025, it operates as a community centre with library facilities.		
Coedpoeth Community Council Offices	Coedpoeth	Wrexham County Borough	1904	N	William Moss	Inactive as a library	As at 2025, operates as municipal offices and a community hub.		
Colwyn Bay Carnegie Library	Colwyn Bay	Conwy County Borough	1905	N		Active	As at 2025, continues to operate as a library and community hub.		
Criccieth Old Library	Criccieth	Gwynedd	1905	N	Rowland Lloyd-Jones	Redundant	Opened on Saint David's Day by John Ernest Greaves, Lord Lieutenant of Caernarvonshire. Closed as a library in 2017, the council was, as at 2021, considering options for the sale of the building.		
Deiniolen Old Library	Deiniolen	Gwynedd	1913	N		Redundant	Closed when a new library was opened in the 21st century.		
Dolgellau Free Library	Dolgellau	Gwynedd	1913	N	Edward Auguste Fermaud	Inactive as a library	Closed as a library in 2015, when Gwynedd Council opened a new facility on the outskirts of Dolgellau. In 2025 operates as a community centre.		
Dowlais Public Library	Dowlais	Merthyr Tydfil County Borough	1907	Grade II	E. A. Johnson	Active	As at 2025, the site continues as a council-operated community lending library.		
Flint Town Hall	Flint	Flintshire	1840	Grade II	John Welch	Inactive as a library	Carnegie provided a small grant (£200) to convert part of the town hall to a library. This facility was closed in 1955.		
Llandudno Library (1910 block)	Llandudno	Conwy County Borough	1910	Grade II	George Alfred Humphreys	Active	As at 2025, the site continues as a council-operated community lending library.		
Merthyr Tydfil Carnegie Library	Merthyr Tydfil	Merthyr Tydfil County Borough	1936	Grade II	T. Edmunds Rhys	Active	As at 2025, the site continues as a council-operated community lending library.		
Newport Carnegie Library	Newport	Newport County Borough	1907	N	C. T. Ward	Redundant	The library was closed in the 2010s and the building sold. As of 2025, it operates as a children's nursery.		
Penarth Carnegie Library	Penarth	Vale of Glamorgan	1906	Grade II	H. Snell	Active	As at 2025, the site continues as a council-operated community lending library.		
Penydarren Carnegie Library	Penydarren	Merthyr Tydfil County Borough	1902	N		Demolished			
Pontypool Public Library	Pontypool	Torfaen	1908	Grade II	Speir & Bevan	Active	As at 2025, the site continues as a council-operated community lending library.		
Radnorshire Museum	Llandrindod Wells	Powys	1912	N		Inactive as a library	As at 2025, operating as a museum of local history.		
Rhyl Town Hall	Rhyl	Denbighshire	1906	Grade II	A. A. Goodall	Inactive as a library	Town hall 1874-76 by Wood & Turner. Carnegie Library extension of 1906, in matching style by A. A. Goodall. No longer in use as a library or as a seat of local government, it is used for events and by the Denbighshire Registry Office.		
Rogerstone Public Library	Rogerstone	Newport County Borough	1905	Grade II	Swash & Bain	Active	As at 2025, the site continues as a council-operated community lending library.		
Taibach Carnegie Library	Taibach, Port Talbot	Neath Port Talbot	1916	Grade II	John Cox	Active	No-longer council-owned, the building continues to operate as a community-operated library.		
Trecynon Public Hall and Library	Trecynon	Rhondda Cynon Taf	1903	N	C. H. Elford	Inactive as a library	The library was closed in 2013 due to funding shortages but it remained open as a community hub.		
Treharris Public Library	Treharris	Merthyr Tydfil County Borough	1909	Grade II	William Dowdeswell	Temporarily inactive	As at 2025, the library is closed for refurbishment. The council plans to reopen it in September 2025.		
Troedyrhiw Free Library	Troedyrhiw	Merthyr Tydfil County Borough	1903	N	T. F. Harvey	Redundant	The library was closed in the early 21st century and the building was subsequently sold.		
Whitchurch Library	Whitchurch	Cardiff	1904	Grade II	R & S Williams	Active	As at 2025, the library continues to provide book lending and community services.		
Old Library, Wrexham	Wrexham	Wrexham County Borough	1907	Grade II	Vernon Hodge	Inactive	The library closed in 1973. The building remains council-owned and in 2024 it was exploring opportunities to repurpose it as a "creative hub".		

== See also ==
- Andrew Carnegie
- Carnegie library
- List of Carnegie libraries in Europe
- List of libraries in the United Kingdom

== Sources ==
- Hilling, John B. (2018). The Architecture of Wales: From the First to the Twenty-First Centuries. Cardiff: University of Wales Press. ISBN 978-1-786-83285-6. OCLC 1257790624.
- Newman, John (2001). Glamorgan. The Buildings of Wales. Harmondsworth, Middlesex: Penguin Books. ISBN 978-0-300-09629-3. OCLC 1052818155.
- Prizeman, Oriel (2022). The Carnegie Libraries of Britain: A photographic chronicle. Cardiff: Welsh School of Architecture. ISBN 978-1-899-89545-8.
