= Wrexham Library =

Main library of Wrexham, Wales

- Llyfrgell Wrecsam (Welsh)
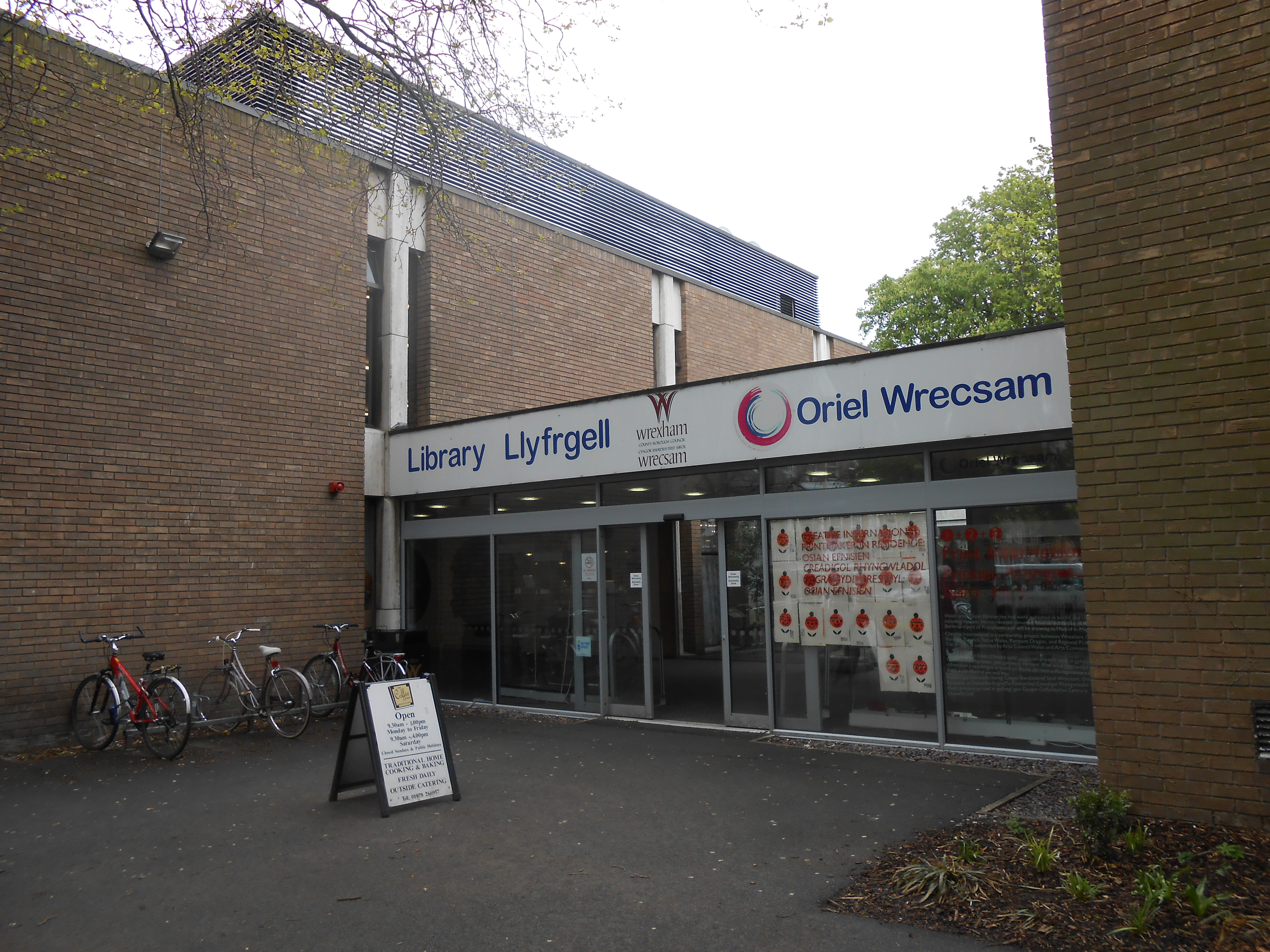
- The building's entrance in 2013
- Interactive map of the Wrexham Library area
- Former names: Wrexham Library and Arts Centre

General information
- Type: Public library Arts centre (Oriel Wrecsam; 1973–2015); Police station (2019–); Council office (2023–)
- Location: Rhosddu Road, Wrexham, Wales LL11 1AU
- Coordinates: 53.048075°N 2.993892°W
- Construction started: June 1971
- Opened: December 1972
- Cost: £178,000 (1971)

Design and construction
- Architect: James A Roberts
- Main contractor: RM Douglas Construction

Wrexham Library (Welsh: Llyfrgell Wrecsam) is the main public library of Wrexham, Wales. Located in the city centre, adjacent to Llwyn Isaf, it opened in 1972, superseding the old carnegie library on Queen's Square.

It is the most visited library in North Wales, receiving 100,000 in-person and digital visitors annually. The library is also home to Wrexham's archives since 2024.

== History ==
By 1700, the site where the library now stands was partly occupied by a mansion house known as Ypsytty (or Ysbyty) Ucha (Welsh for 'Upper Hospital'), later known as Llwyn Isaf, which the nearby field retains its name, while the house itself previously served as the library of Wrexham temporarily.

Construction of the purpose-built library building started in June 1971 and took one year and a half to construct. The construction cost £178,000 and was constructed by RM Douglas Construction. The architect of the building was James A Roberts. The building, located on Rhosddu Road, opened to the public in December 1972. It contained a music library, private study areas, and a children's library. This building near Llwyn Isaf replaced the previous carnegie library building on Queens Square. The building is of the Brutalist style.

Oriel Wrecsam, a contemporary arts centre was based in the building attached to the library on Rhosddu Road since 1973 and until 2015, when it moved out of the adjacent building. The extension was still being built when the library first opened.

In 1983, the first public computers arrived in the library.

In 2003, plans to construct a theatre on and adjacent to the site, for Oriel Wrecsam, and using £6 million of lottery funding was cancelled.

=== Renovation ===
In 2010, the library was renovated, using a grant of £310,000 awarded for the refurbishment from the Welsh Assembly Government. The renovation included a first floor extension, book and DVD stock enhancements, new computers and self-service check-out stations. The renovation also included a BFI Mediatheque being opened at the library, which contained a curated "Through the Dragon's Eye" collection, partly sourced from the National Screen and Sound Archive of Wales, which by 2013 was the only BFI Mediatheque in Wales. During the renovation the library temporarily moved to Chester Street, although the coffee shop and art gallery remained open during the renovation. The renovated library was reopened by Ruth Jones on 22 March 2010.

In 2011, the BBC, who had some operations in the building announced they were vacating their part of the building, moving to purpose-built studios at Glyndwr University.

=== Recent events ===
In March 2015, Oriel Wrecsam announced they were to leave their premises in the library building for a then unknown location, set to open in 2017. Oriel Wrecsam later announced they would open a shop named "Siop//Shop" on Chester Street on 22 April 2015 and close their existing gallery on 28 March, ending the long association between the gallery and library, and while Oriel Wrecsam was present in the building, both were termed the "Wrexham Library and Art Centre". The gallery later became part of the Tŷ Pawb development.

Plans were first made in 2014, to relocate Wrexham town centre police station into the part of the building, that was formerly an Arts Centre (the former Oriel Wrecsam Gallery) following the demolition of the old Bodhyfryd police station and a new station in Llay. In February 2016, the plans were approved.

In July 2016, plans to transfer control of the library as well as Wrexham Museum to a culture trust or NPDO, were scrapped following a review that the transfer would cost the council more money. The proposal was part of wider plans to outsource the council's Libraries, Heritage and Archives Services, in hope to generate more income. The initial 2015 proposed transfer of responsibility involved a South Wales trust, but a local trust was later explored following opposition from councillors of transferring control to a trust in either Blaenau Gwent or Merthyr Tydfil.

In May 2017, work commenced on the new police station in the connecting building where the Oriel Wrecsam gallery once stood. The gallery had moved to Tŷ Pawb.

In April 2019, a minor refurbishment of the library's foyer was conducted. A coffee shop in the building, "The Secret Garden", also opened for the renovation.

On 24 May 2019, the Wrexham town police station opened in a part of the library building.

In Winter 2022, during the United Kingdom cost-of-living crisis, the library would operate as a "warm space", for those unable to afford to heat their homes, and for financial advice and support.

In March 2023, Contact Wrexham, the council's support centre providing in-person services, moved into the building from Lord Street and a temporary location in Wrexham Guildhall, following the expiring of the Lord Street building lease.

From September to December 2023, the building's roof is to be replaced.

== Description ==
The library is said to be the most visited library in North Wales, with over 100,000 in-person and digital visitors visiting the library each year. In 2022, it hosted 479 events that had at least 8,000 visitors.

Installed in 2000, on one of its outside walls, there is a tile mural, the "Millennium Mural", containing imagery of the Acton Four Dogs, Gresford church stained glass, and example's of Wrexham's industrial architecture. Its installation involved over 1,000 children from eight Wrexham schools, working with artist Penny Hampson.

=== Archives ===
Since 2024, the library is home to the Wrexham Archives and Local Studies, or simply the Wrexham Archives (previously the A.N. Palmer Centre for Local Studies and Archives) which holds the archives for the city of Wrexham. The archives were previously held at County Buildings on Regent Street, and it is run by Wrexham County Borough Council as part of its Wrexham Archives and Local Studies Service. The archival centre was initially named after local Wrexham historian Alfred Neobard Palmer when it was opened in 2002 in County Buildings, as part of Wrexham County Borough Museum. Following re-development of the museum to include Welsh football heritage, the archives moved to the library.

==== Materials ====
Materials in the archive include:

- Census returns 1841-1901 for Wrexham County Borough
- Census returns 1891-1901 for Denbighshire and Flintshire
- Census indexes 1881 for Wales, Cheshire, Lancashire and Shropshire
- National Probate Indexes for England and Wales 1858-1943
- Newspapers from ~1850
- Parish registers for parishes in Wrexham County Borough
- Burgess rolls and Electoral Lists from 1857 (incomplete)
- Monumental Inscriptions
- Parish Register transcriptions
- Trade directories 1818-1974
- Books on the history of Wrexham County Borough
- 1881 British Census and National Index for England, Wales and Scotland
- Cemetery Databases for Wrexham Cemetery 1876-2000 and Gresford Cemetery 1917-2000
- Internet access to genealogical sites and historical sites
- Ordnance Survey Maps dating from 1872 -1970s
- Tithe maps for parishes in Wrexham County Borough
- Alan Godfrey old maps covering NE Wales
