= Football Museum of Wales and Wrexham Museum =

Football and local museum in Wrexham, Wales

- Amgueddfa Bêl-droed Cymru ac Amgueddfa Wrecsam (Welsh)
- Coalfield green version of its logo

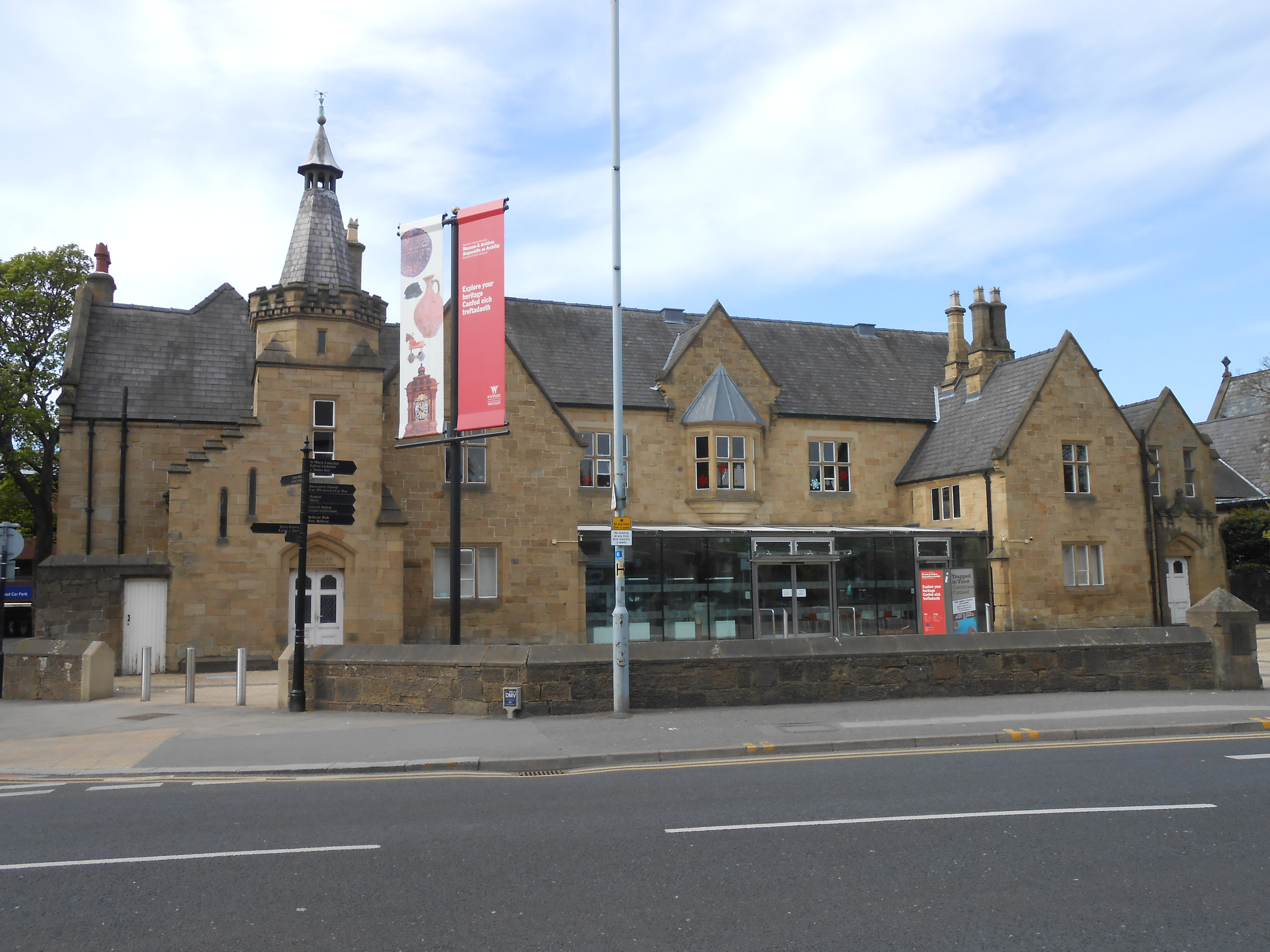
- The building from Regent Street, prior to re-development.
- Former name: Wrexham County Borough Museum; Amgueddfa Bwrdeistref Sirol Wrecsam (1996–2026)
- Established: 25 September 2026
- Location: Wrexham, Wrexham County Borough, Wales
- Coordinates: 53.0470°N 2.9982°W
- Type: Football history and local history museum
- Key holdings: Brymbo Man
- Architect: Thomas Penson (building)
- Public transit access: Wrexham Central (230 m (750 ft); south); Wrexham General (500 m (1,600 ft); west); Wrexham bus station (200 m (660 ft); north)
- Website: wrexhamheritage.wales
- Building details
- Alternative names: County Buildings; Wrexham Museum building

General information
- Status: open
- Type: Museum building
- Architectural style: Tudor Gothic
- Location: Regent Street, Wrexham
- Current tenants: Combined local-football museum (from 2026); Wrexham County Borough Museum (1996–2026); Wrexham Archives (2002–2024), Courtyard Cafe (until 2024)
- Completed: 1857–1858
- Renovated: 2010–2011;2024–2026

Design and construction
- Architect: Thomas Penson
- Designations: Grade II listed building

Other information
- Parking: Three accessible spaces at rear
- Public transit: near Wrexham bus station

Listed Building – Grade II
- Official name: Former County Buildings
- Designated: 15 June 1990; Amended 31 January 1994
- Reference no.: 1800

The Football Museum of Wales and Wrexham Museum (Welsh: Amgueddfa Bêl-droed Cymru ac Amgueddfa Wrecsam) is a national football and local history museum in Wrexham, Wales. It is a redevelopment of Wrexham County Borough Museum, to include a new museum alongside it, the Football Museum of Wales.

The combined museum is located within County Buildings, a Grade II listed building, that had housed the Wrexham Museum since 1996. The building is located between Saint Mark's Road and Regent Street in the city centre, bounded by Wrexham Cathedral to the west. It was designed by Thomas Penson as a militia barracks and built between 1857 and 1858, later becoming a police station and Magistrates' court. The police vacated the building in 1976–1977, with it then becoming part of a local art college, until being bought by the council to become a museum for the newly established Wrexham County Borough in 1996.

The museum is a combination of two museums, or "halves", with one being for the previous local history museum of Wrexham County Borough, and a new football museum for Wales that can house collections dedicated to Welsh association football. Proposals for a national football museum had been proposed by various politicians in both the Welsh Government and local councils. Wrexham County Borough Council's bid emerged as the leading contender for the location of a museum due to Wrexham's football heritage. The building underwent redevelopment from 2024, and opened on 25 September 2026.

== Description ==
The building, known as "County Buildings", or "Former County Buildings", is located on the corner of Saint Mark's Road and Regent Street, in the city centre of Wrexham and in the community of Offa. The Cathedral Church of Our Lady of Sorrows is located to its west also on Regent Street.

Former County Buildings is two-storeys, with a five-bay entrance front which is flanked either side by advanced gabled ranges. The building's architecture is of a Tudor gothic style. The building is composed of roughly coursed and squared stone with freestone dressings and steep slate roofs. The building has a chamfered buttressed tower.

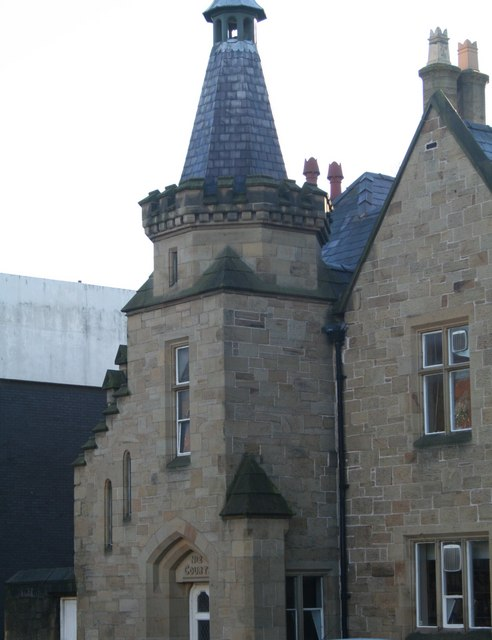
Stonework of the building.

Internally, the building's layout was modified in 1980, with rooms enlarged, a circulation space created and the courtyard enclosed.

=== Wrexham museum ===
Logo of the Wrexham Museum and Archives prior to 2026, while as a separate museum.

The museum has focused on the history of Wrexham and the wider County Borough area. Touring national and local exhibitions are also featured at the museum at various events. The museum had a Courtyard Cafe and a shop, prior to the redevelopment of County Buildings. It is walking distance from Wrexham bus station (200 m (660 ft)), Central (230 m (750 ft)) and General railway stations (500 m (1,600 ft)).Wrexham Cathedral is adjacent to the building's west.

=== Football museum ===
The Football Museum Wales project was backed and funded by Wrexham County Borough Council and the Welsh Government, to set up a national football museum gallery in the building alongside a Wrexham Museum gallery. To accommodate the football museum, the building underwent some "major refurbishment work", which was to make use of the building's entire upper floor which had been partly vacant. The project was allocated £5 million in development funding by the government.

The project collaborated with staff from England's National Football Museum and the Scottish Football Museum. Wales, unlike Scotland and England, had previously not had a national football museum. The project forecast there being an increase of 80,000 in Wrexham city centre's annual footfall following the completion of the football museum. It was projected to open in 2024, with construction starting in 2022. However, the opening date was pushed back to 2026. The galleries dedicated to Welsh football are part of a combined museum, alongside galleries dedicated to Wrexham. It opened on 25 September 2026.

== History ==
=== Early history ===
The building was built as a militia barracks between 1857 and 1858 to the architectural designs of Thomas Penson. The Royal Denbighshire Militia relocated their armoury from Chester Castle, including their guns and ammunition, to the upstairs room of the building, now known as Court Room 1. Metal shutters on the armoury windows were initially planned to be installed, however following a reduction in revolutionary sentiment in the area, they were never installed. The building also provided as the home for the militia's officers, whereas the soldiers resided in houses around the then town and trained for one month annually. The militia vacated the building in 1877, moving to the Hightown Barracks.

In around 1879, the building was converted to a divisional police station of the Denbighshire Constabulary and a magistrates' court. The building was remodelled internally and externally to have two court rooms upstairs and a number of cells on the ground-floor for individuals on remand or accommodated overnight when showing signs of alcohol intoxication. During this conversion, the building was named "County Buildings", while the police and magistrates both relocated from the Old Town Hall. There was living accommodation provided in the rest of the building for the constabulary, including accommodation for the Inspector, Superintendent, Bridewell Sergeant, Constable and four unmarried Constables. Although most eventually lived outside the building, with the Bridewell Sergeant the last the leave in 1960. In the 1901 census, three prisoners were held in the building on census day. The exercise yard for prisoners is present today and surrounded by high walls to prevent escape.

In the 1890s the building was extended and the extension later used as council offices.

During World War II, the Air Raid Precautions (ARP) were based at the back of the building, and an air raid siren was installed during wartime on top of the western side of the building and still works. The siren is played each Remembrance Day. The ARP's garage and cleaning depot was also built in the yard behind the building.

In 1976–77, North Wales Police, which the Denbighshire Constabulary was absorbed into, relocated to Bodhyfryd police station, 0.6 km (0.37 mi) to the north-east, leaving the County Buildings vacant. Both the magistrates and police left by 1979. Between 1977 and 1996, parts of the building were part of a local art college, and it also served as a Citizens' Advice Bureau. The building also survived the threat of demolition.

=== Opening of Wrexham Museum ===
In 1995, Wrexham Maelor Borough Council bought the building for it to be a museum. In 1996, following the formation of Wrexham County Borough, absorbing Wrexham Maelor borough from Clwyd, the building opened as the Wrexham County Borough Museum and Archives.

The building was partly refurbished in the 1990s, with a new wing of the building built to replace a World War II-built structure. The wing was called "Satellite" and were to be used to manage and house the museum's on-site collections and a public study room (the "Collections Centre") for online services to reserved collections not displayed to the public. The new wing costed £398,500, paid with a Heritage Lottery grant of £299,375 and £99,125 from the council. The wing was completed on 15 May 1998.

While the museum was separate, it was managed by the Wrexham Heritage & Archives Service, part of Wrexham County Borough Council's Housing & Economy Department. The archives were then regarded to be part of the museum, and were named in honour of local historian Alfred Neobard Palmer, as the A. N. Palmer Centre for Local Studies and Archives, and opened in 2002.

In 2009, the museum was awarded a £950,000 grant from the Heritage Lottery Fund to open up more of the building to display the museum's collections. In 2010–2011, a glass extension was added to the front of the building, as well as a museum-wide refurbishment, reopening on 14 February 2011. This extension later contained the Courtyard Cafe.

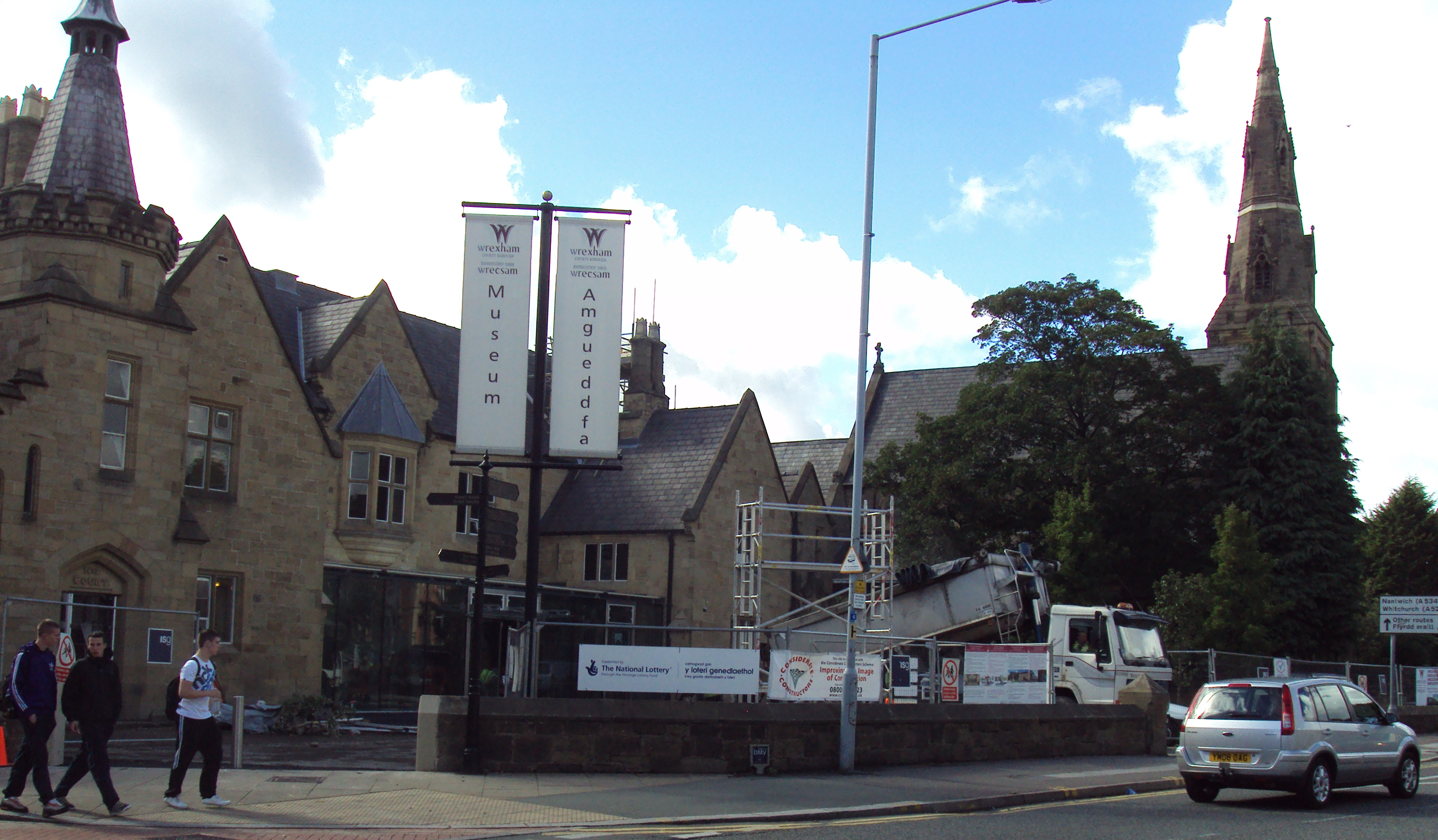
Outside of the museum during refurbishment in 2010

In July 2016, plans to transfer control of the museum as well as Wrexham Library to a culture trust or NPDO, were scrapped. The proposal was part of wider plans to outsource the council's Libraries, Heritage and Archives Services, in hope to generate more income. The initial 2015 proposed transfer of responsibility involved a South Wales trust, but a local trust was later explored following opposition from councillors of transferring control to a trust in either Blaenau Gwent or Merthyr Tydfil.

=== Football museum proposals ===
In 2016, negotiations were underway between Plaid Cymru and the Welsh Labour government over a draft 2017–2018 Welsh Government budget, in which the two parties formed a majority of members in the Welsh Assembly. The draft budget included an additional £3 million in culture funding, which was awarded to the Arts Council of Wales, National Museum Wales, National Library of Wales and the Welsh Books Council, but also towards "feasibility studies for a national art gallery and a football museum in North Wales". By October 2017, for the 2018–2019 draft budget, £5 million was allocated towards the two feasibility studies.

In 2017, it was proposed that a National Football Museum be set up, with Wrexham claimed as the "spiritual home" of Welsh Football, and the leading contender for the museum.

Apart from the bid from Wrexham, the only other bid for the museum came from Powys County Council, which agreed to move forward with its bid in October 2017 to set up the museum in Newtown, Powys. The council stated they had a strong claim to the proposed museum, as they have available land for the project and Newtown A.F.C. was a founding member of the FAW, as well as the town being in the centre of Wales.

==== Selection of Wrexham ====
In November 2018, a Welsh Government feasibility study recommended a national football museum for Wales be set up in Wrexham, alongside other Welsh proposals of a national gallery of contemporary art. The estimated cost for the football museum was £4.4 million, which also involves redeveloping Wrexham Museum, with an annual running cost of £144,500 paid by the Welsh Government. Welsh footballer, Neville Southall, supported Wrexham as the museum's location. By May 2019, Dafydd Elis-Thomas, deputy Minister for Culture, Sport and Tourism in the Welsh Government announced Wrexham was the preferred option.

Wrexham was chosen as the main contender for the football museum due to Wrexham's football heritage as the site of the founding of the Football Association of Wales in the Wynnstay Arms Hotel in 1876, Wales' oldest football club Wrexham A.F.C. founded in 1864 and its home in the oldest international stadium still in use, the Racecourse Ground. Wrexham Museum was already the custodian for the official Welsh Football Collection since 2000, the largest collection of Welsh football memorabilia with 2,000 items. To compare, there are 1,400 artefacts in the Welsh Sports Hall of Fame in Cardiff. Another reason stated by supporters of the proposal for Wrexham to host the museum was that the north-east of Wales does not host any "national museum" of Wales, with the others based in north-west, south-west and south-east Wales, specifically in Cardiff, Swansea, Torfaen, Gwynedd, Newport and Carmarthenshire. The National Football Development Centre at Colliers Park, in Gresford near Wrexham was opened in 2019.

==== Location debate ====
In July 2019, there were discussions over where the museum should be located in Wrexham. Wrexham council's Independent–Conservative executive board approved plans for the museum to be located within the same building as the existing County Borough Museum, later noted to utilise its vacant upper floors. Opposition councillors from Plaid Cymru and Labour proposed the museum should be housed in a re-developed Kop End stand of Wrexham A.F.C's Racecourse Ground. The council responded stating that an independent report by a consultancy firm recommended the museum be housed in the Wrexham Museum building, a recommendation backed by the government. Wrexham A.F.C. also said that they would prefer the museum not be housed in Kop End, so more parts of the redevelopment can go towards money raising facilities.

In December 2020, the plans were clarified to be "advancing" following initial stalling of the project, related to the COVID-19 pandemic in Wales. The council launched a formal tender process in the same month to select a designer of the project. On 3 June 2021, Nick Jones was appointed as Football Museum officer, who previously worked at England's National Football Museum. and was projected to open in 2024 at the time.

On 28 June 2021, a design team for the project was appointed with Haley Sharp Design, which includes Purcell as the architects and MDA Consulting as quantity surveyors. The team would collaborate with the Welsh Government and Wrexham Council to develop designs for the museum.

In July 2021, a football cap dating to 1899 was donated to the to-be-set-up museum.

In November 2021, a public survey was opened for a limited time to local residents to receive local views on the proposals. In June 2022, the project was awarded £45,000 by the National Lottery Heritage Fund. In February 2023, the project received £5.4 million from the Welsh Government, towards the "Museum of Two Halves" project where the football galleries and history galleries would be based side-by-side. The funding was provided following the 2021 Welsh Labour–Plaid Cymru agreement. Wrexham's archives were later moved to Wrexham Library in 2024.

==== Name ====
In 2024, the council launched an online vote into two possible names for the new museum, Tŷ Hanes (Welsh for 'history house') and Histordy (combining 'history' and stordy from Welsh, meaning 'storehouse'). In March 2026, it was revealed that the name instead would combine the two museums names as "Football Museum of Wales and Wrexham Museum".

== Collections ==
=== Local ===
Prior to re-development into a combined museum, Wrexham Museum held the following collections. The museum had hosted over 16,000 objects, with them not all being available to view at the same time, however any object can be requested to the museum to view in-person at an appointed time.

The museum contained three exhibitions, described as 'galleries'. Gallery One was focused on the archaeology and social history of Wrexham County Borough. Gallery Two was centred on various collections of Amgueddfa Cymru – Museum Wales and the National Library of Wales. Gallery Three was used for various other programmes, including touring exhibitions in the museum for a limited period. This included an Ancient Egyptian touring exhibition from the British Museum in 2015, and an exhibition on the Roman history of Holt in 2021.

The museum also hosted an attraction known as the "Time Tunnel". Notable collections in the museum relating to aspects of the local history included: Wales Football collection, the local coal, iron and steel industries, and the brick, tile and terracotta industry.
