= Abergavenny Carnegie Library =

Former library in Monmouthshire, Wales

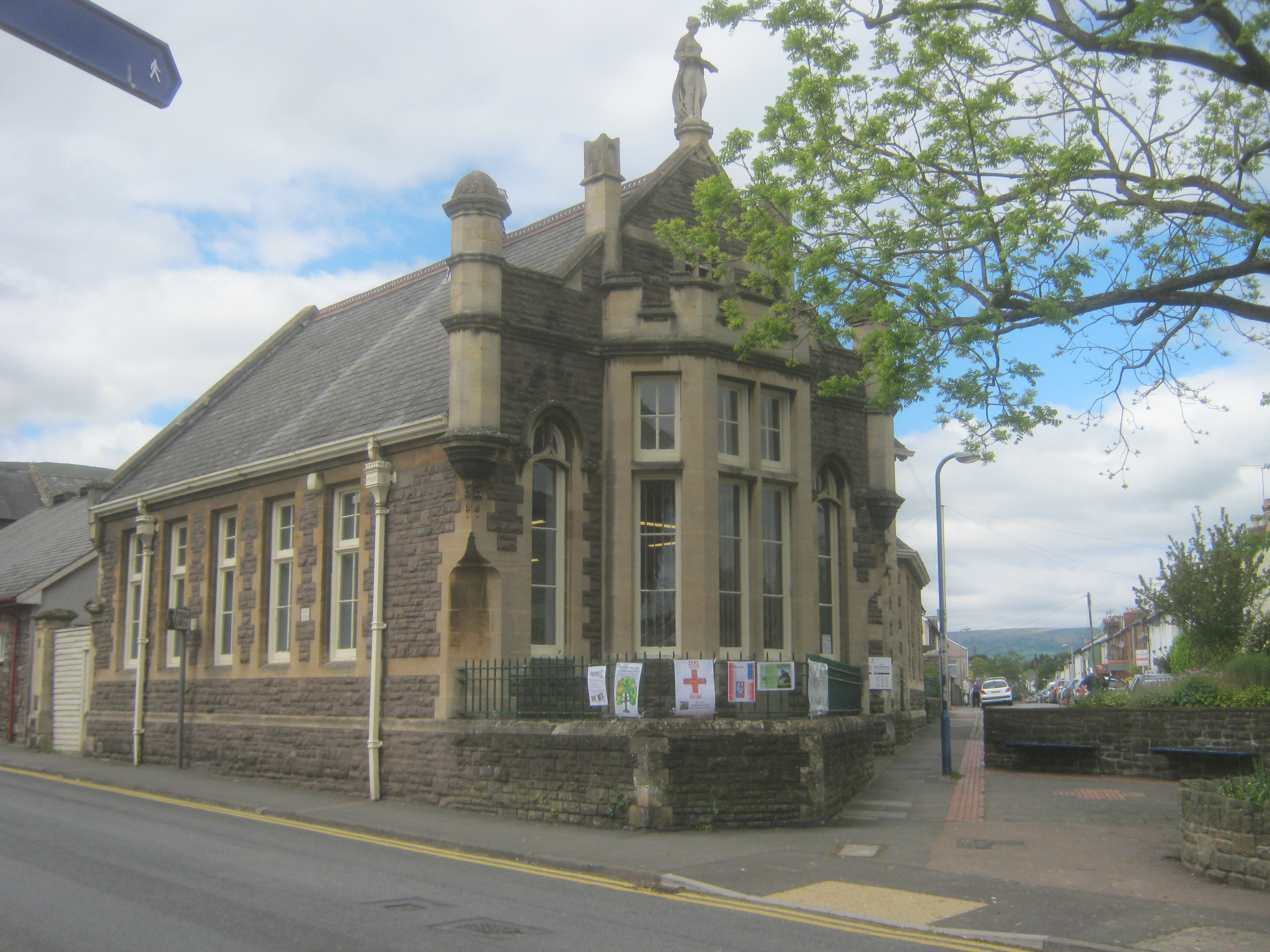

- Location within Monmouthshire
- 51.8231°N 3.0216°W
- Type: Library (former)
- Location: Abergavenny, Monmouthshire

History
- Built: 1905

Site notes
- Architect: B. J. Francis
- Governing body: Monmouthshire County Council

Listed Building – Grade II
- Official name: Abergavenny Public Library
- Designated: 1 November 1974
- Reference no.: 2386

Abergavenny Carnegie Library is a former Carnegie Library in the town of Abergavenny, Monmouthshire, Wales. Built in 1905 with a grant of £4000, it served as the town's library until the early 21st century. After consolidation of the town's library facilities at the town hall, the building was used for other municipal purposes until 2024 when Monmouthshire County Council signed a lease to repurpose it as a mosque. The building has a Grade II listing.

== History ==
Carnegie Libraries were the inspiration of the Scottish-American steel magnate Andrew Carnegie. Between 1883 and 1929, Carnegie's foundation deployed some $40m to fund the construction of some 2,500 libraries worldwide. John B. Hilling, in his study, The Architecture of Wales: From the First to the Twenty-First Centuries suggests that 17 such libraries were built in Wales. (Note: In his study The Architecture of Wales: From the First to the Twenty-First Centuries, John B. Hilling selects The Old Library in Wrexham and Cathays Library in Cardiff as "amongst the more interesting".) Other sources suggest a number nearly double this. The Abergavenny Carnegie Library was built in 1905 to the design of a local architect, B. J. Francis. The building cost some £4,000. It was declared open on 8 September 1906 by William Nevill, 1st Marquess of Abergavenny, Carnegie himself having declined the invitation. (Note: Carnegie did visit the library in 1907.)

The library was closed in 2015 when the council centralised its library facilities at the town hall. The building was then used by the council's children's services department. In 2024, the council announced a 30-year lease on the building had been agreed with the Monmouthshire Muslim Community Association to repurpose the building as a mosque. The decision was confirmed in June 2025, following objections by several local councillors. The mosque will be the first such place of worship in the county.

== Architecture and description ==
The library is built of local sandstone with Bath stone dressings and a Welsh slate roof. The main block is of two storeys, with single-storey annexes to each side. The architectural style is uncertain, with elements of the Gothic and Tudor Revivals. (Note: The building enjoys some local renown as the site of the "most famous spelling mistake in Abergavenny". The foundation stone records the designer as "B J Francis, Architect, Abergavennny".) The Royal Commission on the Ancient and Historical Monuments of Wales describes it as "late Gothic style in early twentieth century idiom". John Newman, in his Gwent/Monmouthshire volume in the Pevsner Buildings of Wales series, notes that the large bay window with a gable surmounted by a statue "take[s] advantage of the acute-angled site". The former library is a Grade II listed building.

== Sources ==
- Hilling, John B. (2018). The Architecture of Wales: From the First to the Twenty-First Centuries. Cardiff: University of Wales Press. ISBN 978-1-786-83285-6. OCLC 1257790624.
- Newman, John (2000). Gwent/Monmouthshire. The Buildings of Wales. Harmondsworth, Middlesex: Penguin Books. ISBN 0-14-071053-1.
- Prizeman, Oriel (2022). The Carnegie Libraries of Britain: A photographic chronicle. Cardiff: Welsh School of Architecture. ISBN 978-1-899-89545-8.
