= Wrexham Police Station (1973–2020) =

Former police station in Wrexham, Wales

- Gorsaf Heddlu Wrecsam (Welsh)
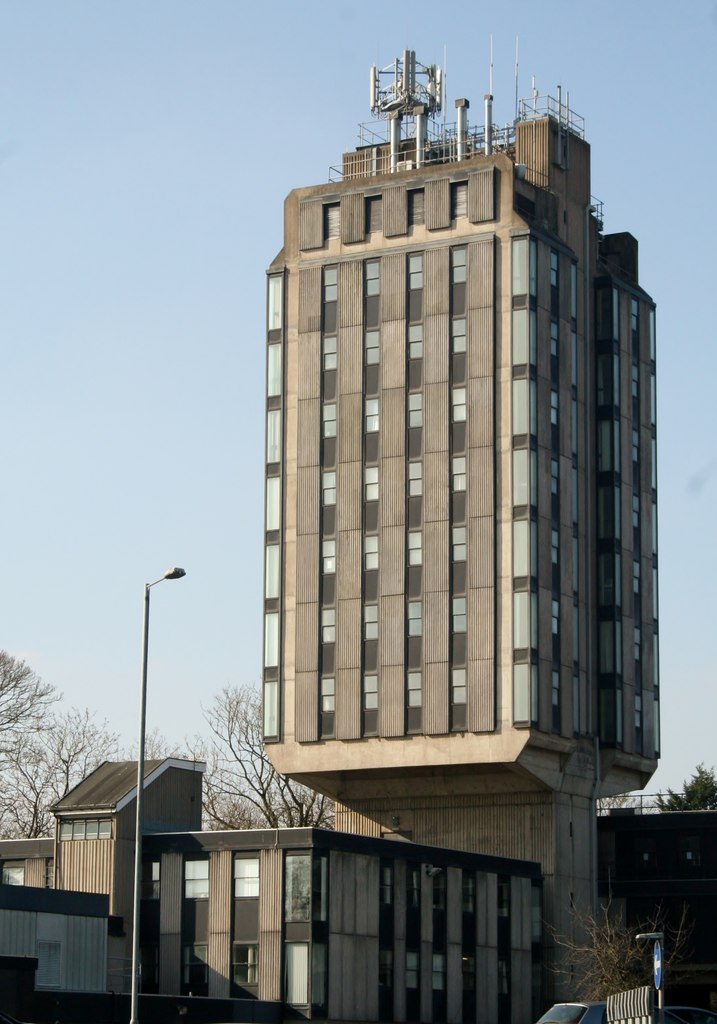
- The building's central tower.

General information
- Type: Police divisional headquarters
- Architectural style: Brutalist
- Location: Bodhyfryd, Wrexham, Wales
- Coordinates: 53.04923°N 2.98977°W
- Year built: 1973–75
- Opened: 1975
- Closed: January 2019
- Demolished: 1 November 2020
- Owner: North Wales Police

Height
- Height: 142 feet (43 m)

Technical details
- Floor count: 10

Design and construction
- Architects: Eric Langford Lewis; Stuart Brown

The Wrexham Police Station (Welsh: Gorsaf Heddlu Wrecsam) was a police station housed in a tall brutalist building, located on Bodhyfryd in Wrexham, Wales. Constructed in 1973 and demolished in 2020, the tower was the tallest building in Wrexham, overtaking St Giles' Church. The building served as a North Wales Police divisional headquarters and Wrexham's police station.

Concerns over maintenance costs and the overall state of the building were raised in 2011. North Wales Police vacated the building in 2019. It was rejected for listed status by Cadw and in November 2020 was demolished in a controlled explosion, amid a national lockdown. Police officers relocated to Llay HQ and to a smaller station near the Wrexham Library. A Lidl supermarket has been built on the site.

== Description ==
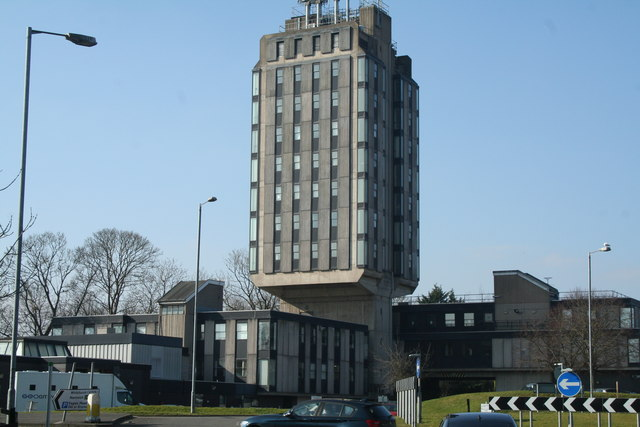
The building from Bodhyfryd.

The station was built in the Brutalist architecture style between 1973 and 1975. It was designed by Eric Langford Lewis, the county architect, and Stuart Brown, the assistant county architect. The building was ten-storeys, and built with an re-enforced concrete frame clad containing pre-cast corrugated concrete panels. The building's defining aspect was its cantilevered tower which emerged from the building's central stalk. The tower was 142 feet (43 m) tall, and contained the main offices, briefing and interview rooms, and the Special Branch's highly specialised accommodation. When opened, the tower became Wrexham's tallest building, overtaking the tower of St Giles' Church. The building served as the divisional headquarters of North Wales Police until replaced by a facility in Llay, as well as Wrexham's police station, since replaced by a smaller one near Wrexham library.

Its Brutalist architecture style made it difficult for some to like, described once as a "monstrosity". Cadw, the Welsh Government's historic environment service in a letter explaining its refusal to list the building, said it was a "rare and unusual (possibly unique) example of slab and podium design in Wales which makes an expressive architectural statement", but that "in the handling of form, materials and design, the building does not compare favourably with other buildings of similar design which are notably more sophisticated and elegant". North Wales Police and Crime Commissioner, Arfon Jones acknowledged that the tower defined the skyline of Wrexham for an era but said he could not get "very sentimental about the old HQ" and "always thought it was a bit of a dump".

== History ==
Construction of the building began in 1973, and it opened in 1975. The building served as an integral part of the Bodhyfryd site alongside the Wrexham Memorial Hall, Wrexham Law Courts and Waterworld. The police station replaced the old Wrexham city centre police station, which was housed in County Buildings, now the Wrexham County Borough Museum.

The police station was also home to a carrier control point, meaning within the Cold War it would be responsible for the sounding of air raid sirens for the local area, and distributing the “Attack Warning Red” message to places like large factories or Royal Observer Corps Nuclear Monitoring Posts. However, the national system of Carrier Control Points was dismantled at the end of the Cold War, in the 1990s.

In 2011, North Wales Police expressed concerns that the building could no longer be used, as it was very expensive to maintain. The cost of maintaining the building over the next ten years was estimated to be £6 million, and the police force had suggested that "it is likely the tower will be removed", hinting at a possible demolition of some form. At the same time, the police station in Mold, Flintshire was also under review and was recommended to remain open while the Wrexham station's future remained uncertain. The force later announced it would build a new facility in Llay, on the outskirts of Wrexham. No decision was made at the time on what the existing building should become, but only that it was "no longer suitable" and "no longer fit for purpose" for the police force to use, due to the building's poor aging facilities and high maintenance costs. In 2012, the police force cut opening times at its police stations, including in Wrexham, to save money.

A pair of peregrine falcons nested on the tower roof for a number of years and a webcam monitored several chicks being hatched and fledged. The falcons had been relocated by August 2015 when the building was proposed for demolition.

=== Proposals for demolition ===
It was originally set to be demolished in August 2016. Its proposed demolition raised concerns that the adjacent buildings, which form Wrexham's "civic area", namely a magistrates' court, Wrexham Waterworld, Wrexham Memorial Hall, the local cenotaph and the Crown Buildings would also be under review. However, the recent abandonment by the council to demolish Waterworld, had been argued to have quelled fears of a "mass land sell off", although concerns remained over the possibility of moving the courts to Mold, and a councillor's disapproval of the police station site being turned into homes. In November 2016, the building was put up for sale, with the expectation it would be vacated by 2018.

The police station closed in January 2019, and police services temporarily relocated to Crown Buildings on Chester Street. A smaller police station opened in May 2019 conjoined with the Wrexham Library building, and a larger police headquarters facility opened in Llay in November 2018.

In February 2019, Cadw, the Welsh Government's historic environment service responsible for listed buildings in Wales, reviewed a request for the listing of the building to protect it from demolition. Police and Crime Commissioner, Arfon Jones, stated that if the building was not demolished, the proposed sale of the site to supermarket chain Lidl would fall through, negatively impacting police funding in North Wales. Jones had written a joint-statement, with the North Wales Police chief constable Carl Foulkes, to Jason Thomas, the Welsh Government's director for Culture, Tourism and Sport asking for clarity on the possible listing. Cadw confirmed the building would not be listed and so the demolition could proceed. Local people were split on the issue, some calling it an "iconic building" of Wrexham, while others stated it was an "eyesore".

=== Demolition ===
The planned demolition of the building was approved in March 2020. Removal of the tower's electrical equipment started in July 2020. Parts of the building were demolished through to October 2020, while the rest, including the tower, was demolished on 1 November 2020 in a controlled explosion streamed online during Wales' national lockdown. Some local roads were closed during the demolition. The demolition was featured in the TV show Scrap Kings.

=== Site ===
The entire site was expected to sell for £1.5 million, and be available for homes, retail outlets and a hotel. In January 2017, the council announced it was assessing bids for the site. In August 2018, Lidl submitted an application to open a store on the site. The council conducted a retail assessment into the need for a new supermarket and later stated that Lidl had successfully demonstrated the need for a new store. Concerns raised by neighbouring supermarket Asda over an excessive increase in traffic in the area were dismissed by planners, who stated the estimated five per cent increase was not significant and nor would a planned drive-through coffee shop increase traffic or have an impact on pollution. The council planning committee later unanimously approved the scheme.

Nine months prior to the demolition, a petition was submitted opposing the redevelopment of the site for a supermarket. The petition did not suggest alternatives, but criticised the redevelopment and stated that the data used to gauge demand for a new supermarket was outdated. Some of those signing the petition proposed a walk-in hospital or an indoor ski centre, while others said there were already too many supermarkets in the town. By October 2020, shortly before the full demolition, 365 people had signed the petition. Nonetheless, a 14,262 square feet (1,325 m^{2}) Lidl supermarket was built on the site. The proposal for a drive-through coffee shop was not followed through.
