= Old Library, Wrexham =

Former library in Wrexham, Wales

Old Library
- Yr Hen Lyfrgell (Welsh)
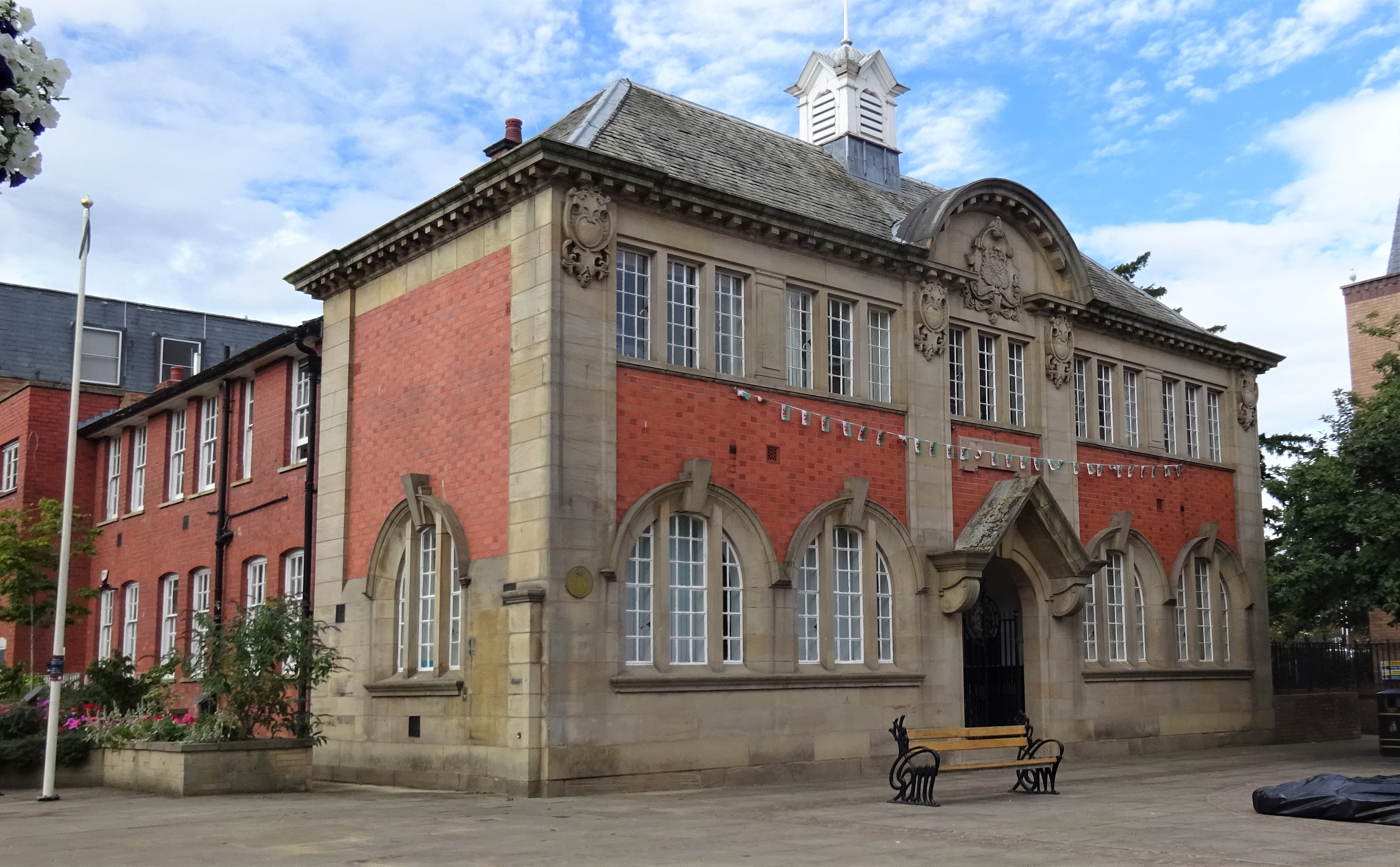
- Interactive map of the Old Library area

General information
- Type: Library (1907–1973); Council office (1973–2023); Creative arts hub (since 2025)
- Location: Queen's Square, Wrexham, Wales
- Coordinates: 53.047014°N 2.993582°W
- Construction started: 1 January 1906
- Completed: 1907
- Opened: 15 February 1907
- Renovated: 1951; 2025
- Renovation cost: £6,641 (1951)
- Owner: Wrexham County Borough Council

Technical details
- Floor count: 2

Design and construction
- Architect: Vernon Hodge

Listed Building – Grade II
- Official name: Old Library
- Designated: 23 December 1975; Amended 31 January 1994
- Reference no.: 1852

The Old Library (sometimes Old Carnegie Library) is a building on Queen's Square in Wrexham city centre, Wales. Built as a carnegie library in 1907, the building served as Wrexham's public library until 1973, when it later became council offices. The building is Grade II listed and owned by Wrexham County Borough Council. Since 2025, it now serves as a hub for the creative arts.

== History ==
The building was constructed as a library and lecture hall in 1907. It was designed by Vernon Hodge. Over 100 architects had submitted designs for the new library. The building is a Grade II listed building, and located in Wrexham city centre's Queen's Square.

The construction received funding from Scottish-American philanthropist Andrew Carnegie following an appeal over the lack of space for books in the town's existing library located in the Guildhall. A grant of £4,000 to build and £300 to furnish the library was provided from Carnegie for the building's construction. (Note: In total, the Carnegie Foundation deployed about $40 million to fund the construction of some 2,500 Carnegie libraries worldwide. John B. Hilling writes that 17 such libraries were built in Wales, although other sources suggest a number nearly double this.)

Mayoress of Wrexham, Mrs Birkett Evans laid the building's foundation stone on 1 January 1906. The building was opened on 15 February 1907 by Foster H.E. Cunliffe of Acton Hall, and the Mayoress of Wrexham Mrs Edward Hughes, with Mayor Edward Hughes, the aldermen and councillors also attending. Upon opening, the building's ground floor consisted of a lending library, magazine room, newsroom and a ladies' room. While the first floor had a "very fine" lecture hall, offices and a bookstore. The 1907 opening involved a speech by Cunliffe, which included referencing Homer's Odyssey as a "great adventure read for boys", and describing Wrexham as a bilingual town, where English should not be viewed as an alien language. The ceremony involved using an inscribed gold key to open the library's gates.

During World War II, the building housed 500 juvenile and 700 adult books from Liverpool Library following the evacuation of 9,600 children from Merseyside. The blackout during the war led to an increase in reading, with the number of library borrowers "dramatically" increasing during the war. The Food Office and an Information Bureau, were set up in part of the library during the war.

The building was enlarged in 1951, at the cost of £6,641, modernising facilities and the addition of a "Wrexham Room" for books, illustrations, manuscripts, records of local interest, and an "Exhibition Room" to display art, craft and lectures.

The building was vacated of its library function in 1973, with the library being superseded by the current library located on Llwyn Isaf, with the current library opening in 1974. Since 1973, the Old Library building had been used as council offices. The building is owned by Wrexham County Borough Council, and as of 2023, it was used to house the council's IT department.

In December 2020, Wrexham council announced it was planning to sell the building. This follows previous revelations that the council were vacating the building by moving their IT systems from the building into the renovated Crown Buildings. In January 2023, the council asked for any expressions of interest from any potential new occupiers, and described the building as "under used".

In February 2023, a councillor called for the building to be made available for public use. The council refused to comment.

=== Arts hub ===
In April 2024, it was announced the building is hoped to be converted into a "multi-purpose creative hub". The project is expected to cost £4 million, with £2.9 million already committed from the Welsh Government's Transforming Towns Fund. The remaining cost is hoped to be raised from other grants such as the UK Shared Prosperity Fund. The hub is aimed to support entrepreneurship in the creative industry, as well as serve as a "focal point" for local people, groups and businesses. The project aims to create a flexible working and co-working entrepreneurial environment, office space, recording studios, television production facilities, exhibition space, and places to hold workshops, including hi-tech workshops. Renovation work was expected to start in late 2024, with it scheduled to open in mid 2025. Plans for the renovation were submitted for review in September 2024.

By July 2025, the building was undergoing renovation. A steel and glass extension was being added to the building, which would contain a café. Whilst other renovation works included repairing plastering, works on the roof and tiles, placing internal doors and screens, diverting drains, installing washrooms and high speed internet, manufacturing cast iron floor grills and removing tent and scaffolding.

In November 2025, the Old Library was re-opened following its conversion into a creative arts hub. Reflecting on the 1907 opening, the Old Library's gates were also officially opened with a large key (although not of gold), and a digital key fob, by Mayor of Wrexham Tina Mannering.

== Structure ==
The building is two storeys, with a graded slate roof, an ashlar lower storey and dressings, and is covered in Flemish-bond brickwork on the upper floor's exterior. The building used Cefn stone and Ruabon terracotta during its construction, while the front roof was made of Westmorland slate, and the back roof with Bangor slate. The central bay contains a coat of arms. The main part of the building is in the neo-baroque style. Edward Hubbard, writing in his Clwyd volume in the Pevsner Buildings of Wales series, reissued in 2003, described the building as "Edwardian Baroque in character, but with fresh and free detail". Both Hubbard, and John B. Hilling, in his study, The Architecture of Wales: From the First to the Twenty-First Centuries, note Hodge's use of an almost-continuous run of windows on the first floor.

While used as a library, the ground floor of the building contained a Ladies Room, seating 20 readers, a reference room of a similar size, a general reading room seating 50 readers and a librarian's office. The lending library had the capacity to hold 20,000 volumes. The first floor of the building contained a large lecture hall, seating 200 people. This lecture hall later became a local museum, then a reference room, meeting room, book-club room and a book store.

== Sources ==
- Hilling, John B. (2018). The Architecture of Wales: From the First to the Twenty-First Centuries. Cardiff: University of Wales Press. ISBN 978-1-786-83285-6. OCLC 1257790624.
- Hubbard, Edward (2003). Clwyd: Denbighshire and Flintshire. The Buildings of Wales. New Haven, US and London: Yale University Press. ISBN 978-0-140-71052-6. OCLC 1052818155.
- Prizeman, Oriel (2022). The Carnegie Libraries of Britain: A photographic chronicle. Cardiff: Welsh School of Architecture. ISBN 978-1-899-89545-8.
