= Ryan Rodney Reynolds Memorial Park =

Proposed park in Wrexham, Wales

- Y Parc Goffa Ryan Rodney Reynolds (Welsh)
- Interactive map of Ryan Rodney Reynolds Memorial Park
- Type: Community park
- Location: Henblas Street, Wrexham, Wales, United Kingdom
- Coordinates: 53.0459°N 2.9928°W
- Founder: Rob McElhenney
- Etymology: Ryan Reynolds
- Status: Proposed
- Website: www.parksandwrex.co.uk

The Ryan Rodney Reynolds Memorial Park is a proposed community park on Henblas Street in Wrexham city centre, North Wales, located on the old Hippodrome site. The current name is provisional.

It was announced in October 2023, by American actor Rob McElhenney, for and provisionally named after his fellow co-owner of Wrexham A.F.C., Canadian-American actor Ryan Reynolds, as a birthday present. Although McElhenney stated the final name is "probably something Welsh".

== History ==
=== Union Square and Public Hall ===
The general area where the site now stands was first part of Birmingham Square, but this part later became known as Union Square. The general area was occupied by Birmingham traders to serve as a marketplace to sell their hardware goods. The market was roofed in 1873, forming a new building, and given the name Union Hall and later Public Hall, serving as an assembly room for public meetings and as a theatrical and entertainment space. It became a public hall following its purchase by the Wrexham Public Hall and Corn Exchange Company in 1878, but it was originally intended to be a corn exchange. The Public Hall was destroyed in a fire in 1906/07.

=== Hippodrome ===
A new building called the New Opera House & Public Hall was opened on the site on 1 July 1909. In 1911, the building was renamed the Wrexham Hippodrome or the Hippodrome Theatre. It was renamed again in 1920 as the Hippodrome Cinema, re-opening on 9 September 1920 and closing in November 1959. On 13 June 1961, it re-opened as the Cine Variety House, hosting film and variety until the 1970s. Later in the 20th century, it stopped hosting live theatre, instead, it was converted into a cinema, until 1998 when the cinema closed.

It then stood empty and up for sale, until in 2004 the Hippodrome was bought by a property developer, however, its future was uncertain. There were local campaigns to save the building from redevelopment, giving it listed building status and having it reopened, including support from comedian Ken Dodd. Wrexham council however commenced plans for a new purpose-built theatre elsewhere in Wrexham instead.

By 2006, planning consent was granted to demolish the building and construct commercial units on the 719-square-metre (7,740 sq ft) site. On 16 June 2008, a major fire caused extensive damage to the building. This was merely days after the death of its previous manager, Barry Flanagan. The fire was believed to have been started near a sofa on its ground floor. It took firefighters five hours to control the fire. In March/April 2009 the building was demolished.

In 2018, the site was sold for £98,000 to an unknown buyer, but was later put up for sale again in 2019. In 2022, Wrexham council bought the site, and since then undertook some refurbishment of the site leading it to host some community events afterwards. The council hoped the site would form part of a "Market quarter" in Wrexham.

=== Announcement of proposed park ===
In October 2023, Rob McElhenney announced his proposals for the development of a new park on the old Hippodrome cinema site, on Henblas Street, Wrexham. McElhenney dedicated it as a birthday "gift" for Ryan Reynolds' 47th birthday, of which the pair co-own Wrexham A.F.C.

McElhenney announced the news on social media, stating, "This park will be beautiful. We'll have open green spaces, pop-up restaurants, we'll have movie screenings, there will be actual green lanterns, benches for old guys to swing on and a statue which may or may not look like Ryan." The accompanying social media video included an appearance of American actor Chris Pratt. The project is coined as the "Unofficial Department of Parks & Wrex", with the announcement video being a spin on the Parks and Recreation TV series in which Pratt starred in.

Reynolds responded with a Twitter post, saying that he would use the park to "weep" whenever Wrexham A.F.C. lose a match and "probably [for] draws too". Reynolds and McElhenney have a reputation for "exchanging elaborate social media videos" on the other's birthday.

McElhenney is to submit proposals for the site to Wrexham County Borough Council who have also owned the site since 2021, with McElhenney already presenting "preliminary plans".

In March 2024, a public consultation was held at Tŷ Pawb for local residents to express their views on the proposal. In September 2024, the council announced they are looking to determine the value of the site to assist how much renting or selling the site out to the project would cost. In December 2024, Reynolds and American actor Channing Tatum visited the site, with McElhenney expressing slight jealousy for the visit.

Wrexham council stated that negotiations over the site were continuing in May 2025.

In February 2026, a oak wooden sign spelling out "W R E C S A M", the Welsh name for Wrexham, was placed on the site moving from Queen's Square, due to health and safety concerns. Concerns of the use of "Wrecsam" over the original "Wrexham" was also mentioned by a councillor. It was later announced it would be moved back to the square, following work done on the sign to address the issues. During the dispute, the name "Henblas Gardens" was used to refer to the park site for the first time.

In March 2026, it was announced the park was in the design phase. The council would be leading the redevelopment efforts, while More Better would be focusing on ensuring the park's running and maintenance costs are covered for several years, not impacting the council's finances.

In August 2026, the council released images of what the park could look like.

== Proposal ==
The park is proposed to be what is variously been described as a "multi-use area", community space, or community memorial park. While it was announced with the name "Ryan Rodney Reynolds Memorial Park", McElhenney said that the site would be renamed into "probably something Welsh, not Canadian". The park forms part of the football club's wider vision for the Wrexham area since the pair took over the club in 2020.

When McElhenney announced the park in October 2023, he humorously described it to have "open green spaces", "movie screens", "pop-up restaurants", "actual green lanterns" (Reynolds played the Green Lantern in the 2011 film), "Benches for old guys to swing on" and to have a statue which would "clearly [...] not look like Ryan [Reynolds]".

During the discussions with the council continuing into 2025, project leaders addressed concerns for the park to not be a playground but still have amenities for children while also entertaining parents. Therefore, they were considering any opportunity, including "softscape, hardscape, activations, [and] pop-ups", any ideas to increase footfall but remain specifically connected to the area, community and be fun. Ideas for the site to host summer movie series, food and wine festivals, farmers markets, and to contain water features were raised. However, the park is still not finalised, but if approved, the site would be redeveloped and maintained by the Wrexham A.F.C. co-owners, and its upkeep is to be covered by potential revenue streams generated by the site.

The site being close to Xplore! Science Discovery Centre has raised ideas by the council for it to be a family-oriented space, possibly with play facilities, artworks, street food, tables and chairs, and possibly even a community cinema like the previous Hippodrome. These proposals have led the council to hope the external space would become a destination in its own right for a wide demographic group. The council's leader Mark Pritchard supported ideas for the site to become "some sort of community park".

In August 2026, the council released images detailing potential plans for the site. The images depict the site to possibly contain a large screen, play fountain, trees, planters, and covered tiered seating.
