= Llwyn Isaf =

Green space in Wrexham

Coordinates: 53.047741°N 2.993057°W

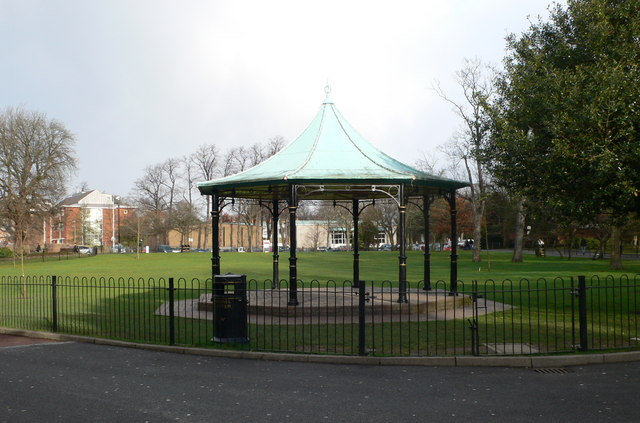
Bandstand at Llwyn Isaf

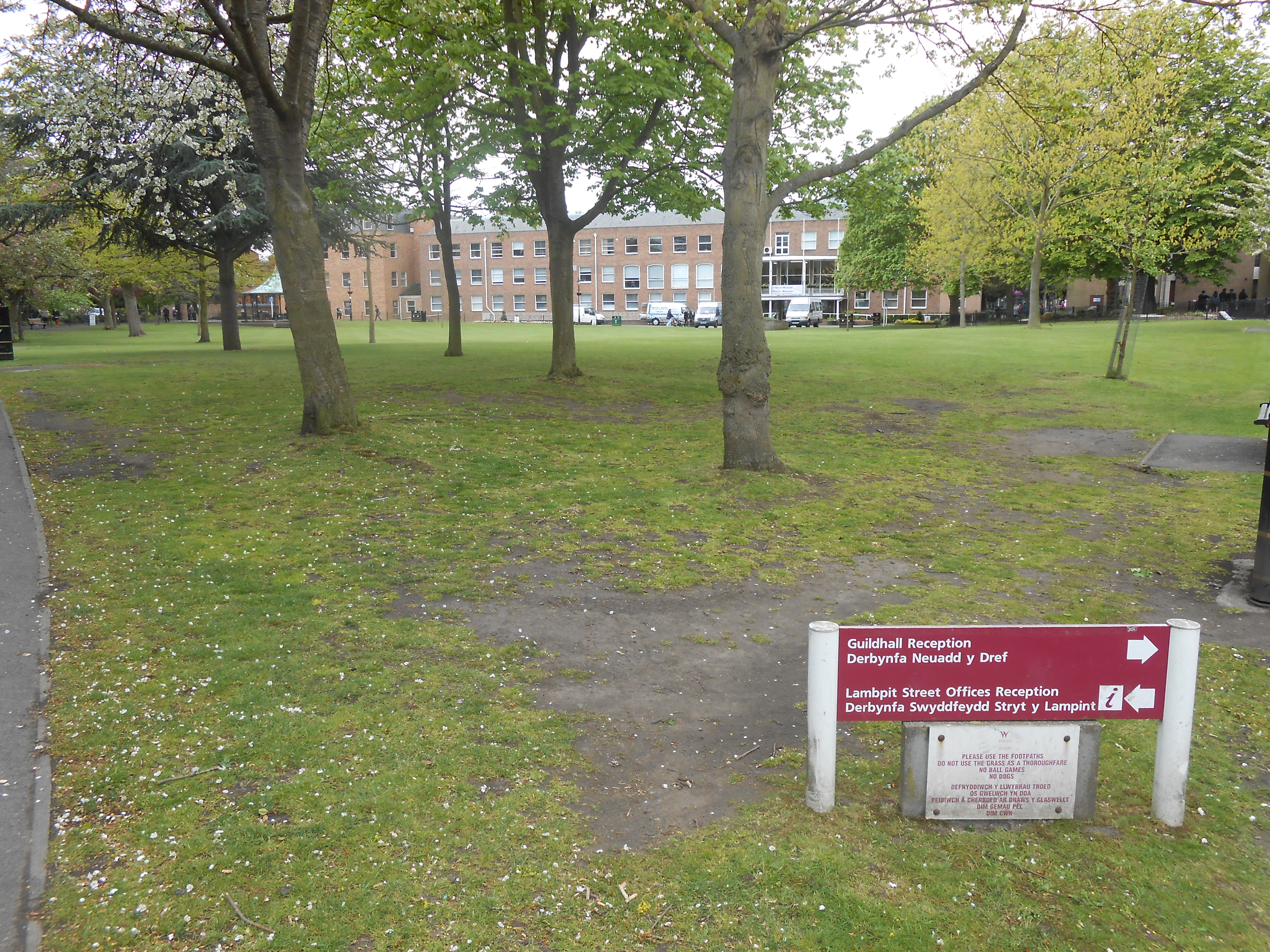
Llwyn Isaf with the Wrexham Guildhall in the distance.

Llwyn Isaf (Welsh for 'lower grove'), also known as the Library Field, is a green space in the centre of Wrexham. It is surrounded on two sides by the city's guildhall and on another by the library.

The space is most popular with students from the nearby Yale College. It is home to a bandstand and often hosts outdoor events and activities. All ball games and alcohol are banned on Llwyn Isaf.

Wrexham Council run a webcam that is pointed at the grass.

== History ==
The green space was originally the landscaped grounds of a mansion house known as Ypsytty (or Ysbyty) Ucha (Welsh for 'Upper Hospital'). This house was said to have been present here by 1700, and would take up the space the Guildhall and Wrexham Library now stand. By 1715, during the Wrexham riots, there are records that a large pond called the "Great Pool" (Pwll Mawr) was located at the end of these grounds adjoining the rears of the buildings along Chester Street. The house on the site was later named Llwyn Isaf (meaning "lower grove") by 1800, and later became a vicar's home by 1830, being leased to then Vicar of Wrexham, George Cunliffe, son of Robert Cunliffe of Acton Hall. Cunliffe subsequently bought the house, and following his death the house became a vicarage.

The original gateway to Llwyn Isaf is the opening next to Chester Street and the library's car park.

Up until 1939, the house potentially served as an extension to the nearby girls' school. Following World War II, the area was proposed by Crosville Motor Services to be surfaced over in tarmac and a bus station constructed on the site, which would have meant the destruction of the park. The house was purchased by the local council in the early 1950s, becoming a temporary home of the local library, but was subsequently demolished to be replaced by the Guildhall. The Guildhall's construction also faced opposition due to fears Llwyn Isaf park would be destroyed in the process.

Llwyn Isaf green now lies at the centre of Wrexham's civic centre just off Queen's Square. The Wrexham Library is to the green's northern side, leading it to also be called the "Library Field". The field is popular with students from nearby Yale College. The field has a bandstand that is also popular with the city's students.

The 1912 Wrexham National Eisteddfod and the 2025 Wrexham National Eisteddfod were proclaimed here. With the 1912 proclamation having David Lloyd George in attendance, and the target of criticism from suffragettes on the Liberal government's opposition on Women's suffrage in the United Kingdom. The following year's eisteddfod, for 1913, was also proclaimed here for it to take place in Abergavenny.

The Welsh Children in Need concert was held at this location in 2005.
