= Waterworld, Wrexham =

Leisure centre in Wrexham, Wales

Waterworld Leisure & Activity Centre
- Canolfan Hamdden a Gweithgareddau Byd Dŵr (Welsh)
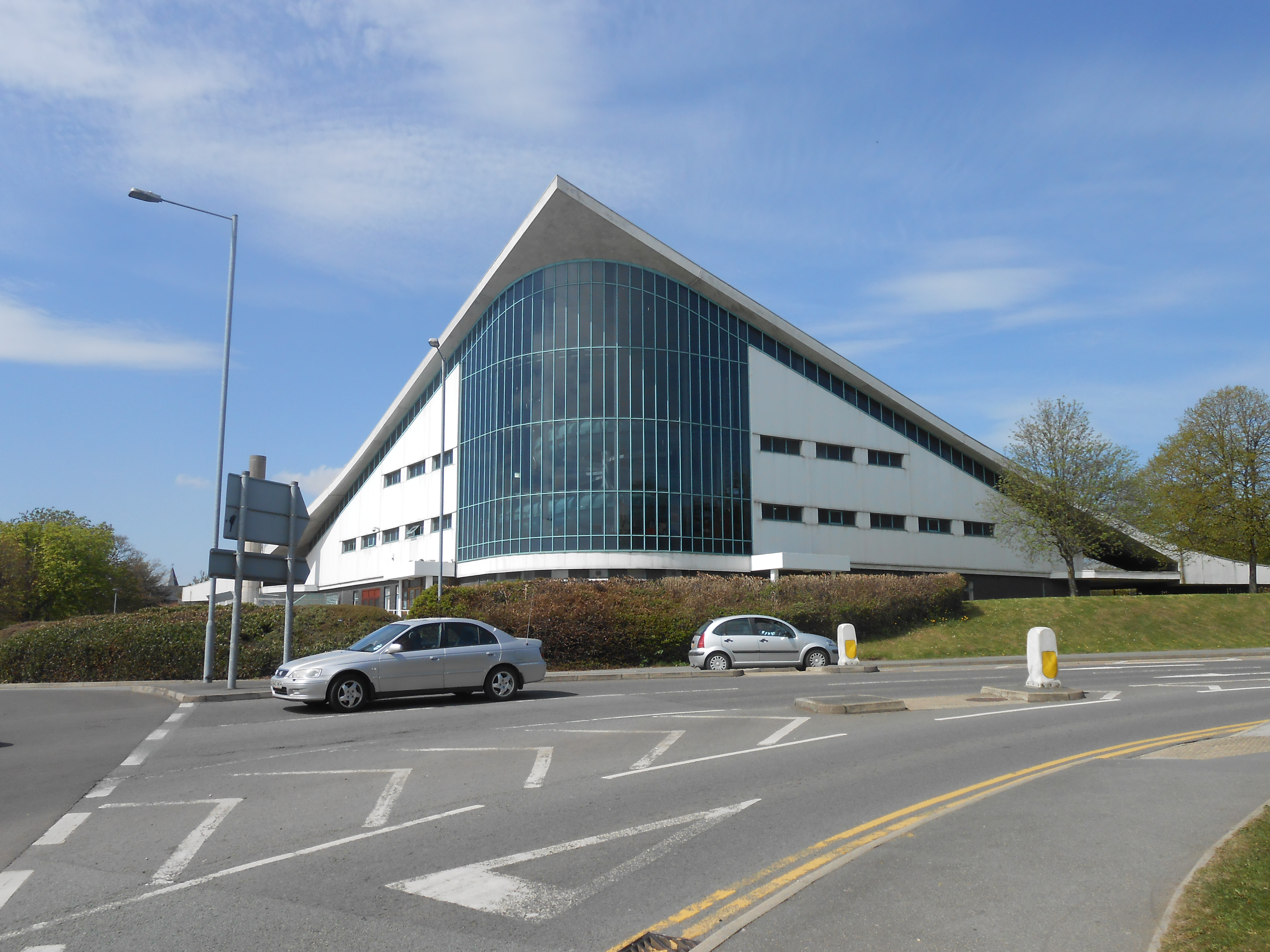
- The building's glazed east elevation adjacent to the A5152 and its roundabout
- Former names: Wrexham Swimming Baths
- Alternative names: Wrexham Waterworld; Byd Dŵr Wrecsam (Welsh)

General information
- Type: Leisure centre Swimming pool
- Location: Wrexham, Wrexham County Borough, Wales
- Address: Holt Street, Wrexham, LL13 8DH
- Coordinates: 53.047804°N 2.989393°W
- Current tenants: Freedom Leisure (2016–2026)
- Completed: 1967
- Opened: May 1970
- Renovated: 1998
- Cost: £400,000 (equivalent to £6,582,410 in 2021)

Design and construction
- Architect(s): F. D. Williamson

Website
- www.freedom-leisure.co.uk/centres/wrexham-waterworld/

Listed Building – Grade II
- Official name: Wrexham Waterworld Leisure & Activity Centre
- Designated: 19 February 2025
- Reference no.: 87942

Waterworld (Welsh: Byd Dŵr), formerly the Wrexham Swimming Baths, is a leisure centre in Wrexham, North Wales. Known for its hyperbolic paraboloid roof, the only roof of its type in Wales, the centre houses a set of swimming pools and a gym. The centre was opened in 1967, with a major refurbishment occurring in the 1990s, being re-opened by Elizabeth II in March 1998 under its current name.

Due to the difficult and high maintenance costs of the roof, the building was proposed to be demolished before its 1998 refurbishment and again in the 2010s as part of a council reorganisation and cost-saving measure of leisure services in Wrexham County Borough. Under these newer proposals, Waterworld was proposed to be replaced by a new facility somewhere in Wrexham city centre. The plans were abandoned in 2015 due to funding concerns, and the centre was instead transferred to a trust, Freedom Leisure, in 2016 for ten years. Since being transferred to a trust, a petition was launched to reinstate the centre's unofficial mascot, a green inflatable alien.

The centre houses multiple pools, a lazy river, water slide, and a bubble pool, as well as a large viewing terrace. It houses a gym, Costa Cafe and spaces for other activities. It was initially rejected for listed status in 2014 by Cadw, however it was listed as Grade II in February 2025.

== History ==
Prior to Waterworld, the then town's former baths dating to 1901 were located on Tuttle Street to the cost of £9,985 (equivalent to £1,369,239 in 2023) and used heating from the neighbouring incinerator. This was where Wrexham Swimming Club was founded, the first in North Wales.

The existing Waterworld building was constructed in 1967 to the designs of F. D. Williamson and opened in May 1970, as the "Wrexham Swimming Baths" or just "Wrexham Baths". The building originally cost £400,000 (equivalent to £7,815,177 in 2023) to construct in 1967. The building's design caused controversy as many objections were raised because of its design, cost and the difficulty of the building. It was possibly the most controversial building in the town at the time. It opened with three swimming pools, 33.5-metre (110 ft) long main pool with a deep centre (210 centimetres (6.9 ft) and two shallow ends (50 centimetres (1.6 ft)), a learners pool, and a 12.2-square-metre (131 sq ft) and 3.8-metre (12 ft) deep diving pool, with concrete diving states at 1, 3, and 5 metres and spring boards at 1 and 3 metres. At its opening, the building was described as "hyperbolic, parabolic and diabolic". Also in the 1970s, the Wrexham Symphony Orchestra, was based in the basement of the building below the swimming pools. It was said underwater swimmers could clearly hear the orchestra, while the sound of swimmers were noticeable to the orchestra.

18 year old, Gareth Williams, of Rhosddu, was the centre's first paying member of the public in 1970. With the centre largely receiving positive comments in The Leader at the time.

The Wrexham Swimming Club moved from Tuttle Street to the building in the same month. It was later threatened with demolition, but was renovated instead and re-opened in March 1998 by Queen Elizabeth II, as "Wrexham's Waterworld". The refurbishment cost £4,100,000 (equivalent to £9,425,053 in 2023).

In the planning stages of the 1998 refurbishment, a feasibility study was conducted by Space Space for Wrexham Council. In the study, the building was considered to be partly converted into potentially either a cinema, theatre, dry leisure complex, an exhibition/conference centre, bars or nightclubs. Although the feasibility study concluded that the best use of the centre was for it to remain a regional swimming facility, but changes were needed to accommodate the increased demand for swimming. The diving pool was replaced with a leisure pool, containing river rapids, a geyser pool, a spa pool and a "Water Chute" rubber ring ride. The 33.5-metre (110 ft) long main pool was modified with the addition of a traversable boom, so its length can be reduced to 30 metres (98 ft) for water polo events or 25 metres (82 ft) for national short course events. The learner pool's depth was also altered to make it more "learner friendly". While the spectator areas were adjusted to provide raked seating for over 200 spectators. All pools were also re-tiled.

=== Proposed demolition ===
In December 2013, Wrexham councillors voted to consider replacing the centre, following advice from consultants. The use of consultants by the council were criticised by supporters of the centre over the £51,760 cost of the consultants. Following the vote the council announced a public consultation into the plans to close Waterworld and the leisure centre at Plas Madoc, and replacing Waterworld with a new £11.9 million facility near the town centre, as part of £13 million council budget cuts as the existing centres would cost £2 million to maintain.

In January 2014, following proposals to close the centre was announced, concerned locals had contacted Cadw, the Welsh Government's historic environment service, for protection, asking for the building to be listed. Listing may protect the building from any demolition or major works which would "change its character", which would require consent from the Welsh Government's Planning Division before any works can proceed.

In February 2014, Wrexham County Borough Council councillors voted to close the centre and possibly replace it with a new facility. One of the touted locations for the new facility is on the Crown Buildings' site, next to the existing Waterworld site. By April 2014, Waterworld was losing £330,000 per year.

In May 2014, Cadw rejected the bid for the building to gain listed building status, arguing that the 1998 redevelopment altered the historic nature of the building, leading the building to be too significantly altered to be regarded as an "exemplar building of its type". The decision was said to make the building more likely to be demolished at the time.

By February 2015, the decision whether the centre would be replaced by a new facility was deferred until March 2015, with the cost for a new facility described as "no longer affordable".

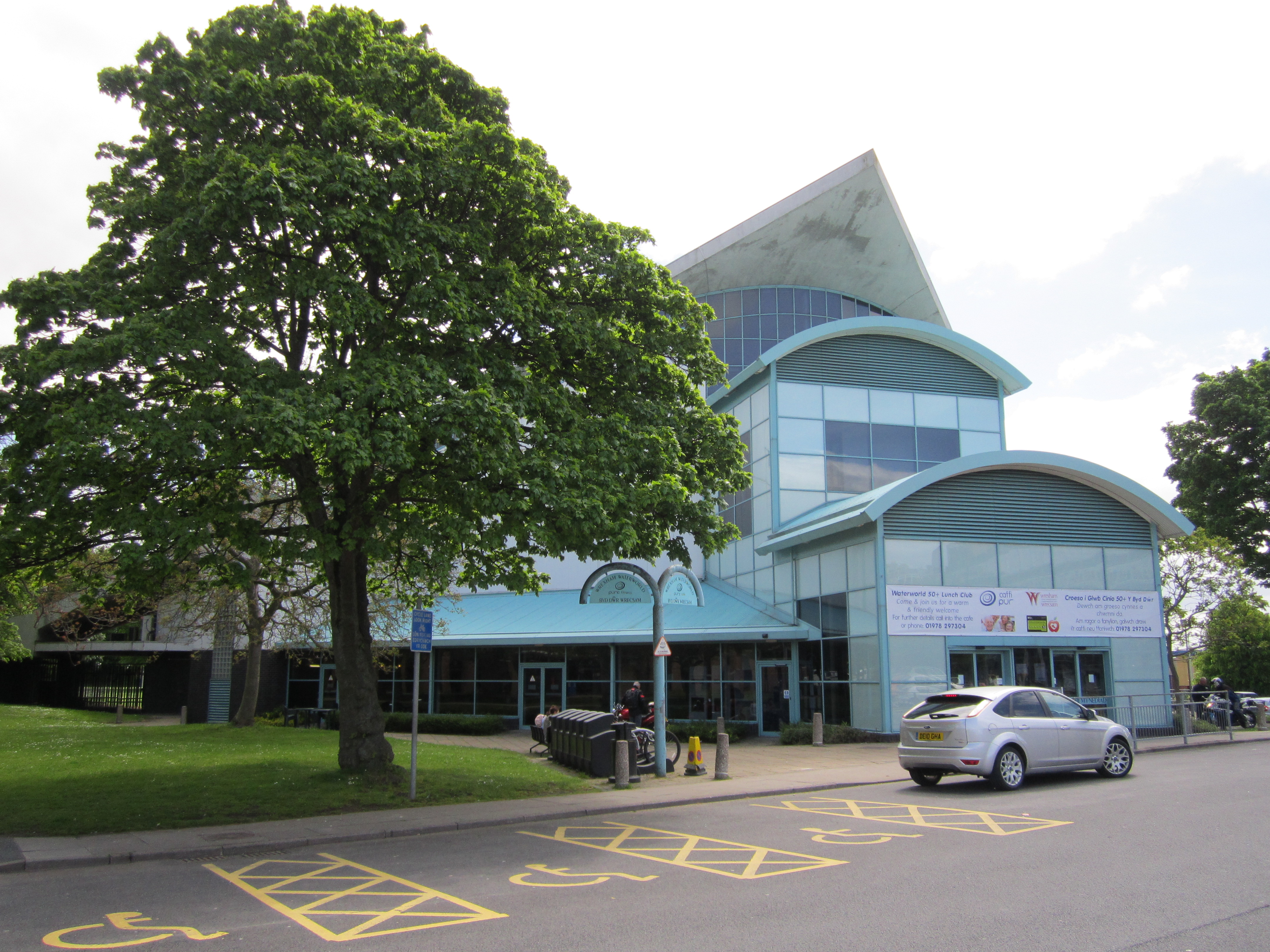
The building's entrance.

In April 2015, the plans to demolish the building were abandoned, due to concerns over the £8.9 million funding gap. The centre was instead passed over to a leisure trust. A report into the building said its lifespan could be extended to 2035. This contrasts to a previous report stating it was nearing the "end of its design life".

=== Trust management and refurbishment ===
In 2016, Freedom Leisure took over the management of Waterworld, as part of a signed agreement between the trust and Wrexham council to manage four leisure and activity centres, and five dual-use sports facilities across Wrexham County Borough. The contract lasts until 2026.

By July 2017, the building underwent a £1–1.5 million refurbishment, including its gym, and reopened in October 2017.

In February 2018, an unnamed member of the public, criticised the trust-managed centre as "disgusting and unhygienic", in particular the building's upper floors.

In May 2019, a petition was launched to bring back the "Wrexham Waterworld alien", the unofficial mascot for the centre. The inflatable green alien was visible from the building's window overlooking the roundabout adjacent to Tesco in Wrexham. The alien was said to be no longer visible when the centre was taken over by Freedom Leisure. When contacted, a Wrexham council spokesman stated "while we rarely comment on former members of staff, we are happy to confirm that the alien who formerly supervised the slide at Waterworld is enjoying a happy retirement".

As of 2022, while there are no formal proposals to close the centre, the council has still considered building a new facility elsewhere in Wrexham, as part of a longer-term strategy to reorganise the area's leisure services. In the same year, The Twentieth Century Society submitted an application for the building to be listed.

On 19 February 2025, the building was Grade II listed by Cadw.

== Description ==
The building's "futuristic" hyperbolic paraboloid roof, is said to be the only roof of its type in Wales. Covering 50 x 50m (160 x 160 ft) in area, the roof was constructed in the 1960s and has had high maintenance costs since. The reinforced concrete construction has suffered issues relating to the moisture and chlorine air in the inside of the building, and weathering on the outside. The renovation in the 1997 and later 2017 hoped to make the structure more durable by using modern materials. The roof remains the building's dominant feature. The building has a glazed east elevation adjacent to the A5152 and its roundabout, while the building's west elevation is made of a series of barrel-vaulted volumes which form steps towards the pointed apex of the roof.

The centre's swimming area has a 25 m (82 ft) by 12.5 m (41 ft) six-lane pool, two learner pools (12.5 m (41 ft) by 8 m (26 ft) and 12 m (39 ft) by 7.5 m (25 ft)), a 65 m (213 ft) slide, a Jacuzzi and a sauna. These two small pools for children and a standard swimming pool were made during its 1990s renovation, which also saw the former diving pool being replaced with a helter-skelter-style water slide. The original viewing facilities, described as being "poor", were also replaced with a large, terraced seating area. There is also an indoor raft ride, a bubble pool and a lazy river leisure pool.

The centre houses a Costa café, gym and sun beds.
