= Llandudno Library =

Public library in Llandudno

- Location: 46 Mostyn Street, Llandudno. LL30 2RP, United Kingdom
- Established: 1910
- Architect: Edward Owen of GA Humphreys
- Branch of: Conwy Libraries

Collection
- Items collected: Books

Other information
- Website: https://conwylibraries.com/visit-libraries/conwy-libraries/llandudno-library

Llandudno Library is a public library, located on Mostyn Street in Llandudno in Conwy, north Wales, UK. It is one of the county's main branch libraries and attracts around 170,000 visits a year. It is run by Conwy Libraries and part of the national Wales Libraries consortium.

== History ==
Llandudno's first library was in 1855-56 located at the public baths (western end of the Marine parade) which held London newspapers (delivered by express), journals and popular books. Although it was a subscription model, typical of the time before the Public Libraries Act. The opening in July 1956 was celebrated with dramatic readings of Shakespeare and other poets by actress Charlotte Vanderhoff.

The site where the modern library now stands was originally home to the Llandudno Newsroom and Library, which was a subscription library founded in 1873 by Augusta Mostyn. The foundation stone was laid on 14 October 1873 by William Bulkeley Hughes MP. One of the regular subscribers and visitors was the politician John Bright, who when holidaying used to call in daily to read The Times.

As the 1894 local government act increased the availability of funding for public libraries, Llandudno were offered a £2000 library in 1889 but it was refused. The need for a public library became apparent; not everyone could afford to subscribe to a private library. An agent of the Mostyn Estate arranged for the library philanthropist Andrew Carnegie and the local gentleman John Walker (whose financial wealth was from his family's Walker Brewery company) to finance a new building which would house a public library, under the care of the town Council. Lord Mostyn still had a substantial mortgage attached to the site, which led to Carnegie almost pulling out, but Mostyn was convinced to gift the site to the council.

Local architects GA Humphreys oversaw the design enlisting specifically a local contractor called Edward Owen to design the library. However, as Humphreys was on the committee for the library his choosing was deemed a conflict of interest by other local firms. The new library was opened in 1910. T. Marchant Williams opened the library officially in that year, "the planting of a library in any town was a sure way of providing solace for the human heart and widening and sweetening the outlook on life". However the library did not recruit its first qualified librarian until 1935.

Further extensions werre built in 1938-39 and 1992, much of the original facade was retained but the extensions replacing some of the building's rear. In 1996 a plaque to commemorate local Punch & Judy performer John Codman was placed on the library's exterior wall.

Exhibitions included one of John Tenniel's Alice in Wonderland cartoons in February 1998.

The library obtained a computerised Library Management System in 1999.

Bench Mark on Llandudno library

In 2025 plans began to suggest a move of Llandudno's library to Venue Cymru prompting local protests and a petition against it raising more than 1800 signatures.

== Services ==
The library holds a collection of approximately 38,000 titles. The library no longer issues overdue fines and as part of the Libraries Wales consortium members can reserve any book from across Wales free of charge. There are also 20 computers and free wi-fi as well as rooms for hire for meetings and training. There are children's story and rhyme sessions three times a week in both Welsh and English.
