= Queen's Square, Wrexham =

Public square in Wrexham, Wales

Queen's Square
- Public square
- {{{other_names}}}
- Sqwâr y Frenhines (Welsh)
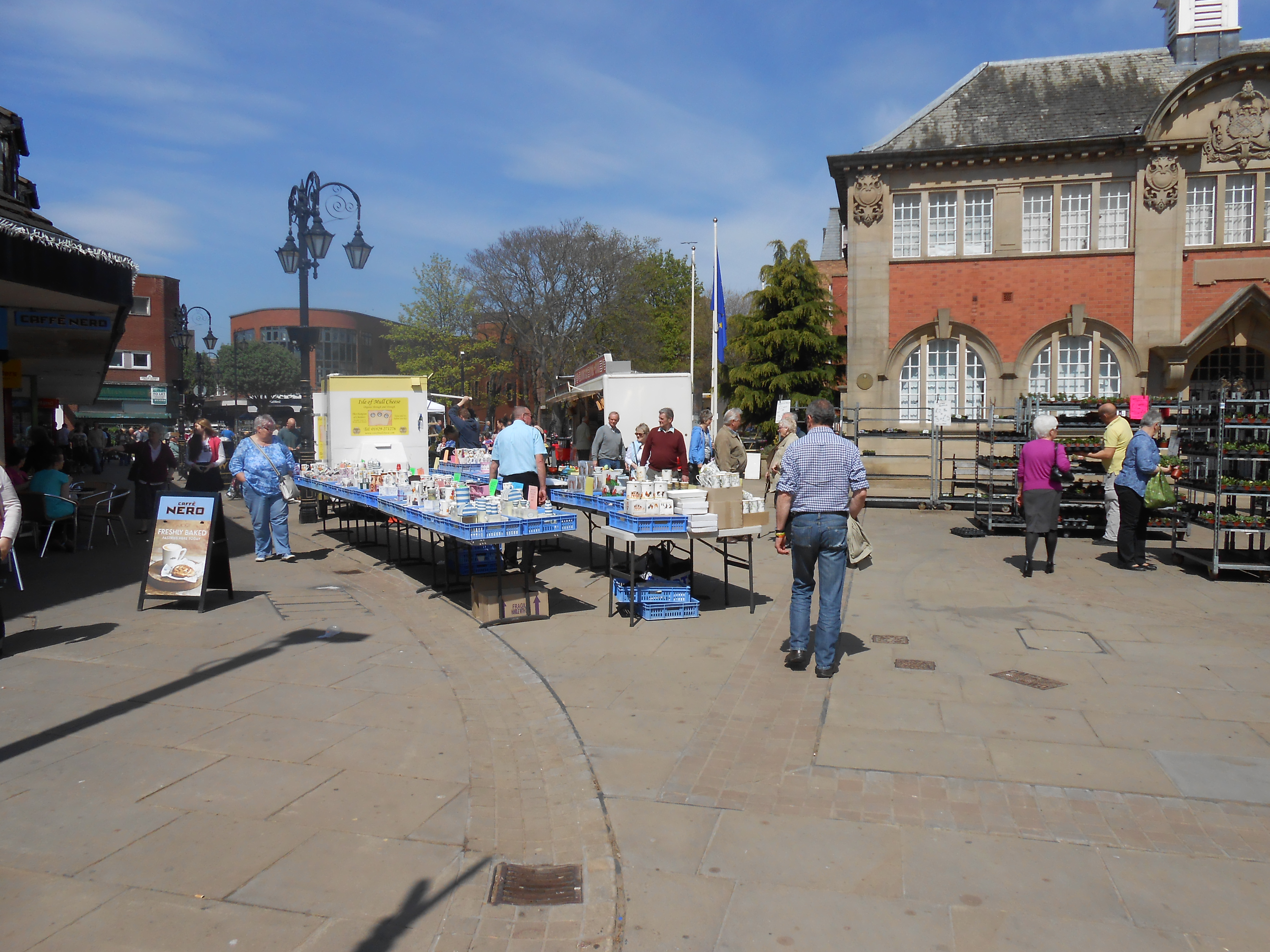
- Outdoor market held in the square, with the Wrexham Old Library to the right.
- Amenities: Retail; Old Library; Markets; Public events; Banking; Guildhall; Council offices
- Location: Wrexham, Wales, UK
- Coordinates: 53.046775°N 2.993472°W

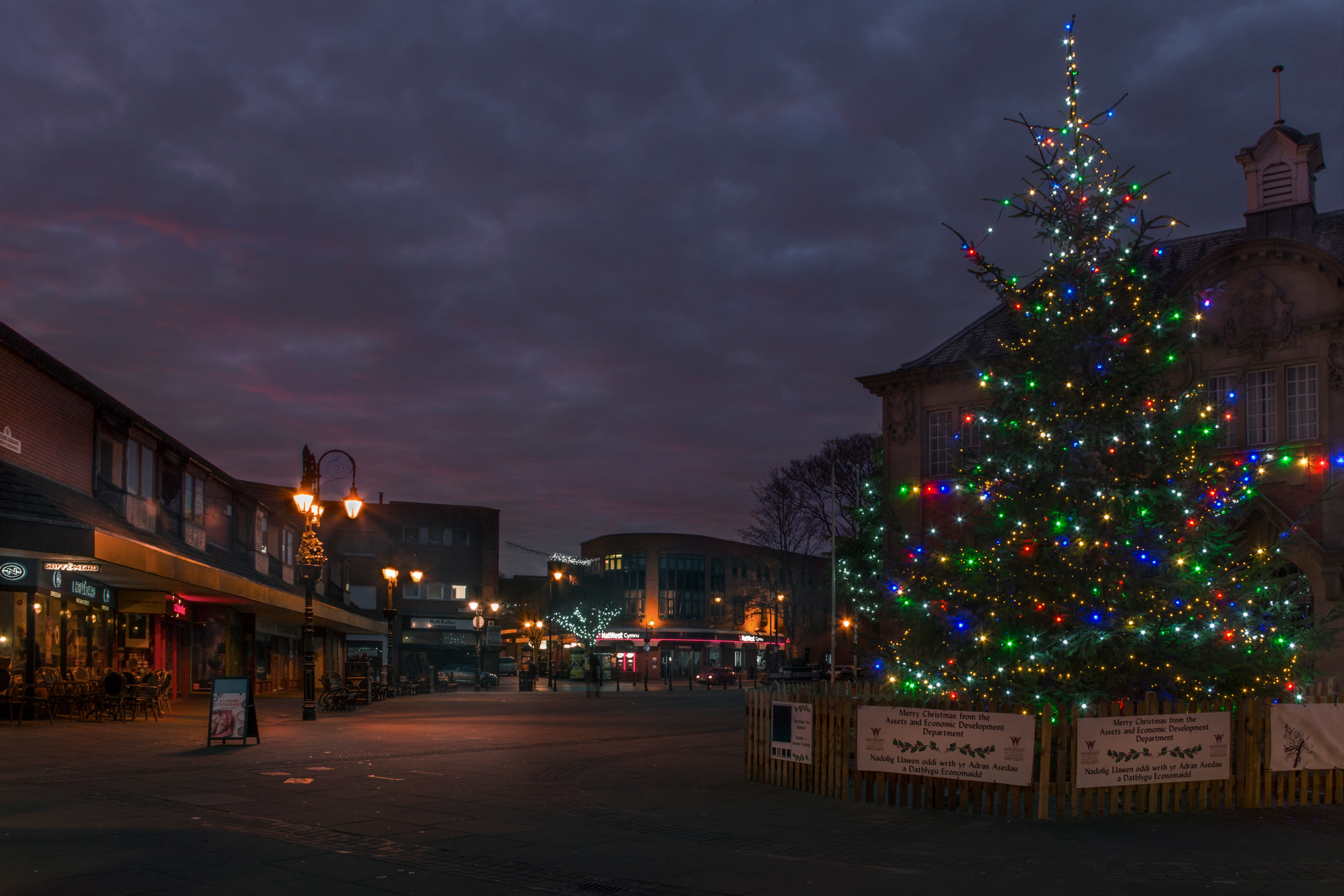
Christmas decorations in the square in December 2016

Queen's Square (Welsh: Sqwâr y Frenhines) is a public square in Wrexham city centre, North Wales. It is located adjacent to the Wrexham Guildhall and Old Library. It is a main site for various events in the city, in particular outdoor markets.

== Description ==
The Old Library and Henblas Square development are located next to the square. Next to the square is also a proposed re-development known as "Chapter Court", which included the Wrexham Enterprise Hub from 2018 to 2023. From 1910 to 1960, adjacent to the old library, the square housed a temporary cinema building known as the "Glynn Cinema", or "Glynn Picture House". Prior to the Henblas Square development, there was a Vegetable Market next to the modern Queens Square, but it was eventually demolished for the Henblas Square development. The old Queen's Square was located nearby on what is now the site around Henblas Street. The original square was market square surrounded by two-storey buildings, similar to the Chester Rows.

Various events are held in the square, such as for the armed forces, emergency services, and Saint David's Day. A family playday and art exhibitions are also held in the square, such as Wrexham's Christmas tree (including the annual Christmas light switching-on event), the Knife Angel, and a 2013 man in a bin exhibit. For Focus Wales 2023 festival, it hosted Hwb Cymraeg as part of the May event.

In 2005, it was the first site in Wales chosen for a public broadcasting system, which involved the installing of a large television screen.

A weekly market on Mondays has been held in the square since 2006. Routinely various one-day markets take place in the square, which included an artisan market, continental market, plant-based market, and part of Wrexham's Victorian Christmas market.

Re-development proposals for the square were put forward by the council in 2016.

In February 2026, a oak wooden sign spelling out "W R E C S A M", the Welsh name for Wrexham, was placed on the site, but later moved to the former Hippodrome (proposed Ryan Rodney Reynolds Memorial Park) site, due to health and safety concerns. Concerns of the use of "Wrecsam" over the original "Wrexham" were also mentioned by a councillor. It was later announced it would bemoved back to the square, following works on the sign, in a council u-turn.
