= Guildhall, Wrexham =

Municipal building in Wrexham, Wales

Guildhall
- Neuadd y Dref (Welsh)
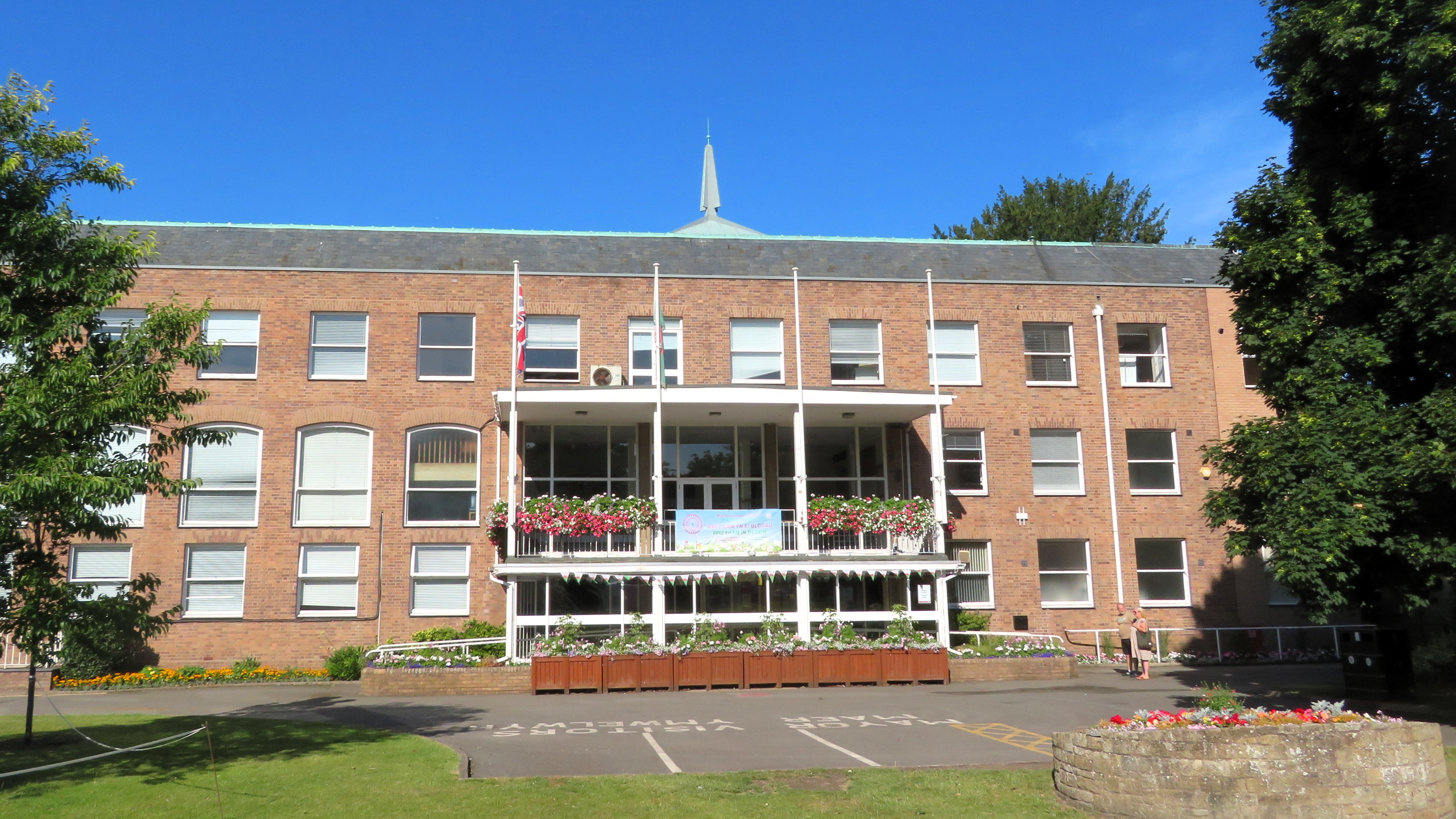
- The building's main entrance, fronting Llwyn Isaf field.
- Interactive map of the Guildhall area

General information
- Architectural style: Red brick and Neo-Georgian
- Location: The Guildhall, Wrexham LL11 1AY
- Coordinates: 53.04747°N 2.99387°W
- Construction started: 1959
- Construction stopped: 1961
- Opened: 25 May 1961
- Renovated: 1980−1981
- Owner: Wrexham Borough Council (1961–1974); Wrexham Maelor Borough Council (1974–1996); Wrexham County Borough Council (1996–)

Design and construction
- Architects: Stephenson, Young & Partners

The Guildhall (Welsh: Neuadd y Dref; lit. 'Town Hall') is a municipal building in Wrexham, Wales. It is located in the city centre alongside the Llwyn Isaf open space. It is the headquarters of Wrexham County Borough Council and is the administrative centre of Wrexham County Borough, as it was of its predecessor Wrexham Maelor.

== Architecture and history ==
The Guildhall is located on the grounds where the mansion house Ypsytty (or Ysbyty) Ucha (Welsh for 'Upper Hospital') once stood, first recorded to be located here by 1700. The house later became known as Llwyn Isaf, whose name survives as the name of the field in front of the Guildhall. The house was purchased by the council in the early 1950s, and subsequently demolished to construct the modern Guildhall. The Guildhall's construction faced some opposition over fears its construction would lead to the destruction of the Llwyn Isaf field. There were earlier proposals after World War II to surface the area with tarmac and construct a bus station on the site instead.

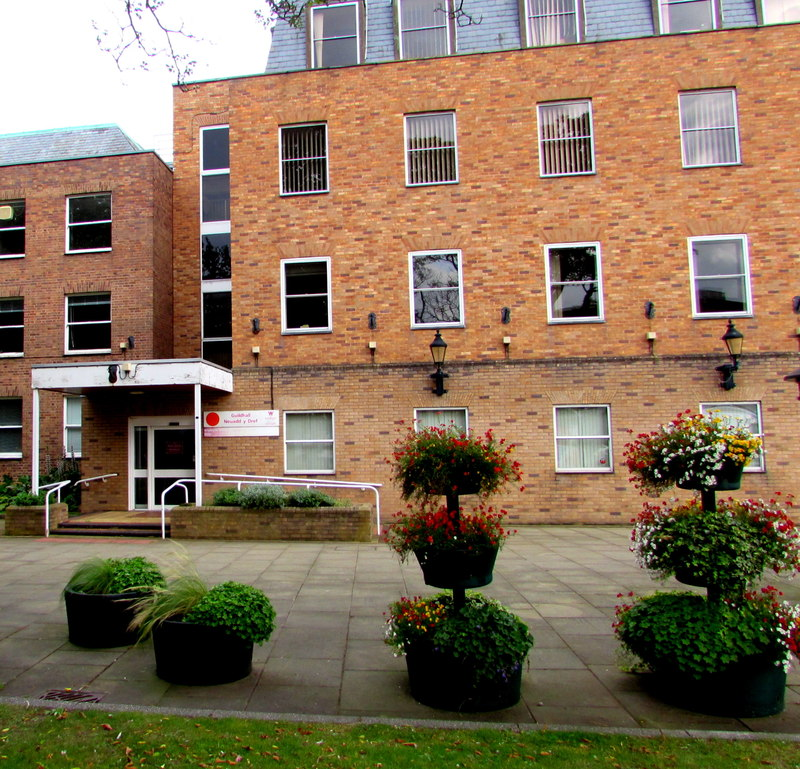
Rhosddu Road entrance of the building.

The current building was commissioned to replace the Old Guildhall in what was Guildhall Square, between Henblas Street and Lambpit Street. The new building was built between 1959 and 1961 and was opened by Princess Alexandra on 25 May 1961.

The building is in the Neo-Georgian style, to a design modelled on Stockholm City Hall by the architects Stephenson, Young & Partners. It has a red brick façade with three storeys of Georgian arched windows, a cantilevered gallery towards Llwyn Isaf, and a copper tower. The building cost £150,000 (equivalent to £3.7 million in 2023). It is surrounded with flowerbeds that have been described as a "notable addition to the amenities of the town". The frontage was modified in 2018 as a security measure, blocking off the front stairs but maintaining two ramps either side of the front of the building. It was partly extended between 1980 and 1981.

== Political activity ==
In October 2011, it held a meeting of the Welsh Grand Committee of the House of Commons, the first to be held in Wales for 10 years.

As the centre of local government in Wrexham, protests and political rallies have been held outside the building, including a 2021 protest against the council's application for city status and a 2022 rally for Welsh independence.

== Other uses ==
Ceremonies for appointing mayors of Wrexham are held in the building, as are other ceremonies such as for awarding the title "Freeman of Wrexham". The Guildhall is used as a wedding venue, and is lit up to mark special occasions. For a few months in 2023, it housed Contact Wrexham, the council's in-person support office.
