= Wrexham Maelor =

Former district of Clwyd, Wales

Coordinates: 53°00′N 3°00′W

Wrexham Maelor Welsh: Wrecsam Maelor
- Borough
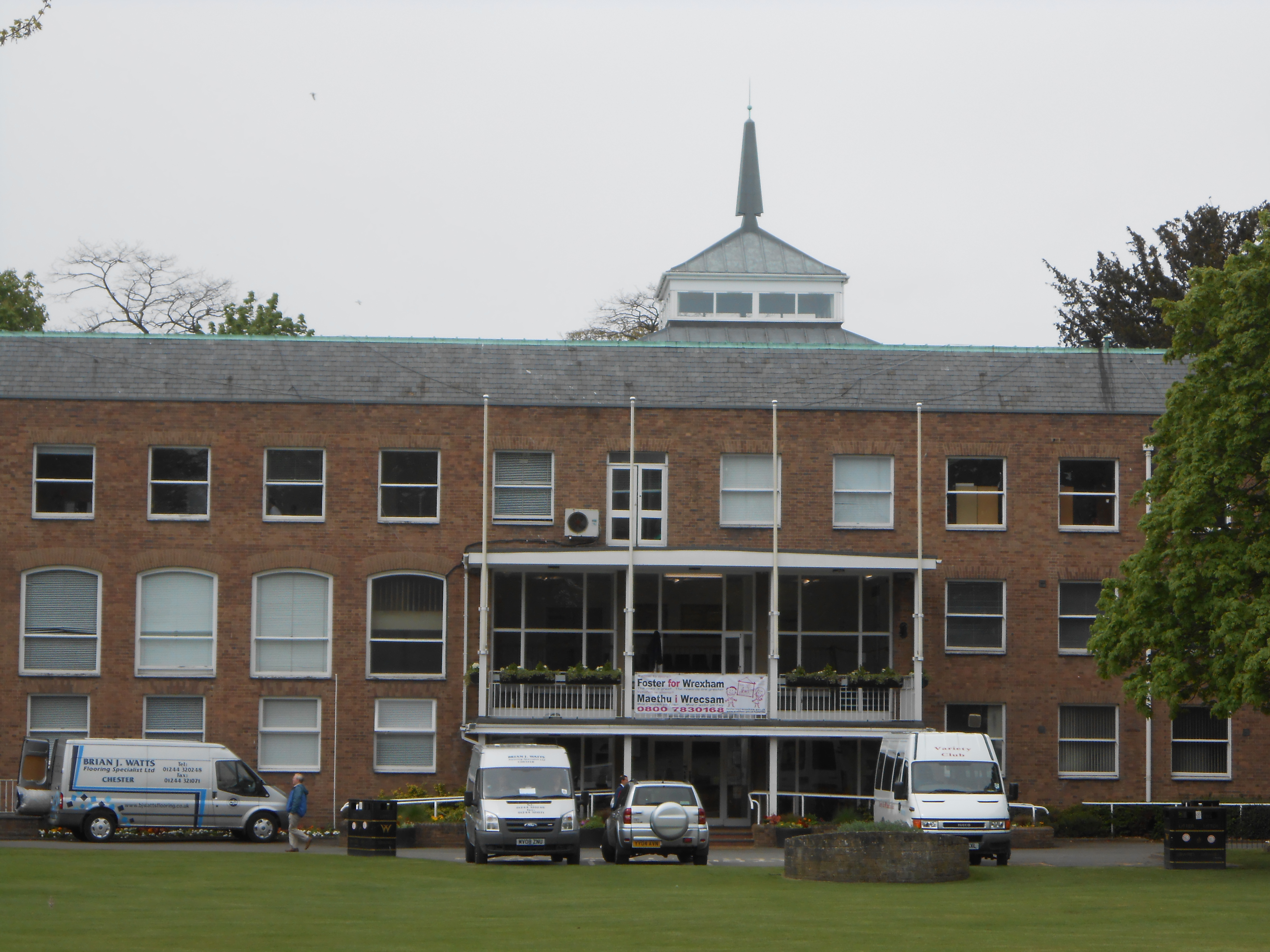
- Guildhall, Wrexham, the council's headquarters

- History
  - Created: 1 April 1974
  - Abolished: 31 March 1996
  - Succeeded by: Wrexham County Borough
  - HQ: Wrexham
- Contained within
  - County Council: Clwyd

Wrexham Maelor (Welsh: Wrecsam Maelor) was a local government district with borough status, being one of six districts in the county of Clwyd, north-east Wales, from 1974 to 1996.

== History ==
The borough was created on 1 April 1974, under the Local Government Act 1972. It covered parts of four former districts which were all abolished at the same time:

- Maelor Rural District
- Marford and Hoseley parish from Hawarden Rural District
- Wrexham Municipal Borough
- Wrexham Rural District (except the parishes of Llangollen Rural and Llantysilio, which went to Glyndŵr)

The two Wrexham districts had been in the administrative county of Denbighshire prior to the reforms, whereas Maelor Rural District and the parish of Marford and Hoseley had both been exclaves of Flintshire, separated from the rest of the county by Denbighshire.

In 1996 the borough was abolished under the Local Government (Wales) Act 1994, which saw Clwyd County Council and its constituent districts abolished, being replaced by principal areas, whose councils perform the functions which had previously been divided between the county and district councils. The former Wrexham Maelor area all went to the new Wrexham County Borough, forming the bulk of the new borough.

== Political control ==
The first election to the council was held in 1973, initially operating as a shadow authority alongside the outgoing authorities until it came into its powers on 1 April 1974. From 1974 until the council's abolition in 1996, political control wasas follows:

Party in control	Years
Labour	1974–1976
No overall control	1976–1987
Labour	1987–1996

== Premises ==
The council was based at the Guildhall, which had been built in 1961 as the headquarters for the former Wrexham Borough Council. After Wrexham Maelor's abolition in 1996 the building became the headquarters for the new Wrexham County Borough Council.
