= Cathays Library =

Library in Cardiff, Wales

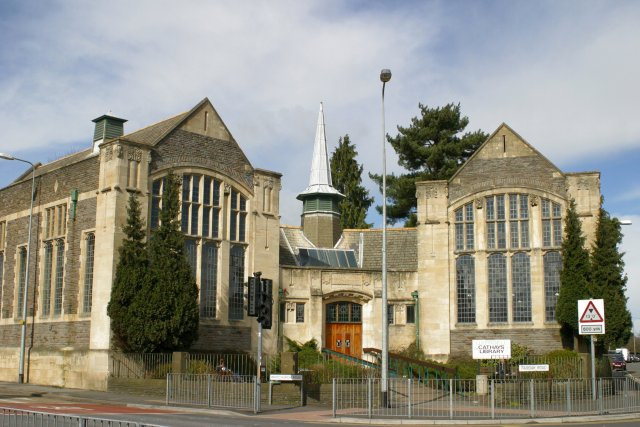
- Cathays Library in 2007

- Location within Cardiff

General information
- Architectural style: Arts & Crafts
- Location: Cardiff, Wales
- Coordinates: 51.4974°N 3.1821°W
- Completed: 1907

Design and construction
- Architects: Speir & Bevan

Cathays Library is a Grade II* listed library building in Cathays, Cardiff, Wales. It is one of the 2,500 Carnegie libraries, financed by the American businessman Andrew Carnegie.

== Location ==
The library is situated on the northern edge of Cathays at the junction of Crwys Road, Whitchurch Road and Fairoak Road, opposite Fairoak Primary School. It backs onto Cathays Cemetery.

== History ==
Preceding the current library was a Cathays Branch Reading Room, which opened in May 1890. It initially contained 300 books and had an assistant librarian. Funds for the building of a new library came from the Carnegie Foundation. Between 1883 and 1929, the foundation deployed some $40m to fund the construction of some 2,500 libraries worldwide. John B. Hilling, in his study, The Architecture of Wales: From the First to the Twenty-First Centuries suggests that 17 such libraries were built in Wales. Other sources suggest a number nearly double this.

The current library was constructed between 1906 and 1907, though the panel above the main door is inscribed 1906. The building is in an Arts & Crafts Gothic style, designed by Cardiff architects Speir & Bevan. It has a generous single storey in a 'butterfly' plan, with two main wings parallel to Whitchurch Road and Fairoak Road. The front gable ends have large windows each divided into four lights. The building's central entrance section has a narrow octagonal tower above it, with a leaded spire. John Newman, in his Glamorgan volume in the Buildings of Wales series, described the building with enthusiasm; "Speir and Bevan exploited the site beautifully. The style [is] handled with exquisite delicacy".

It was designated in 1975 as a Grade II* listed building, as "an especially accomplished and well-preserved Arts and Crafts design" with a "pioneering butterfly plan".

At various points in the 21st century, Cathays Library has been threatened with closure, either due to reviews of the library services by Cardiff Council or claims of excessive repair costs. In 2003, 1000 people signed a petition to keep the library open. In autumn 2009, the library closed for repairs and refurbishment. £1 million was spent (including £300,000 for the Welsh Government) to remove dry rot and damp rot, clean the exterior and bring the interior up to modern standards. It reopened in June 2010.

In around 2016 Cardiff's historic documents, census records and newspapers were relocated to Cathays Library, from an inaccessible and expensive location off Newport Road. This was partly done to keep Cathays Library viable, because the younger student population were using the library far less.

== Facilities ==
Following the library's reopening in 2010, the original reception desk was kept but with new modern furniture including moveable 'designer' shelving. The west wing of the building was reopened, having previously been closed following an arson attack. The library had 15 public computers and a small meeting room for up to 10 people. The building also has public toilets which had been restored.

The library holds Cardiff's heritage and local studies collection. It also hosts history activities and community events. It is closed on Fridays and Sundays.

== See also ==
- Roath Library

== Sources ==
- Hilling, John B. (2018). The Architecture of Wales: From the First to the Twenty-First Centuries. Cardiff: University of Wales Press. ISBN 978-1-786-83285-6. OCLC 1257790624.
- Newman, John (2001). Glamorgan. The Buildings of Wales. Harmondsworth, Middlesex: Penguin Books. ISBN 978-0-300-09629-3. OCLC 1052818155.
- Prizeman, Oriel (2022). The Carnegie Libraries of Britain: A photographic chronicle. Cardiff: Welsh School of Architecture. ISBN 978-1-899-89545-8.
