= Non-profit distributing organisation =

A non-profit distributing organisation (NPDO) is a form of business structure where, although profit is still sought, any profit is reinvested in services or business growth rather than being distributed to shareholders. NPDOs are often used for delivering public services at arm's length from United Kingdom local councils, such as Sentinel Leisure Trust.

== See also ==
- Nonprofit organization
