= Leighton Hall, Powys =

Leighton Hall
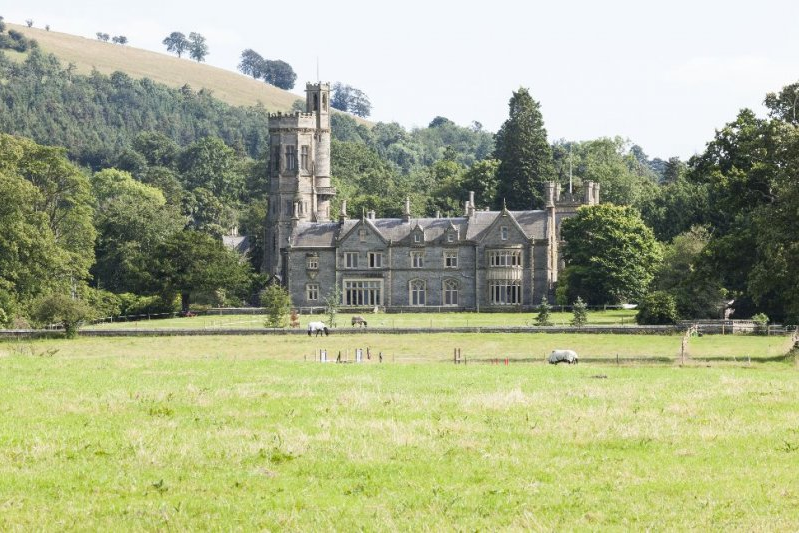
- Leighton Hall

- Location within Powys
- 52.633531°N 3.122577°W
- OS grid reference: SJ 2411604585

History
- Built: 1850–56

Site notes
- Architect(s): W. H. Gee, possibly to designs by James Kellaway Colling
- Architectural style: Castellated Victorian Gothic Country House

Listed Building – Grade I
- Official name: Leighton Hall
- Designated: 24 December 1982
- Reference no.: 8663

Cadw/ICOMOS Register of Parks and Gardens of Special Historic Interest in Wales
- Official name: Leighton Hall
- Designated: 1 February 2022; 4 years ago
- Reference no.: PGW(Po)34(POW)
- Listing: Grade I

Leighton Hall is an estate located to the east of Welshpool in the historic county of Montgomeryshire, now Powys, in Wales. Leighton Hall is a listed grade I property. It is located on the opposite side of the valley of the river Severn to Powis Castle. The Leighton Hall Estate is particularly notable for the hall which was decorated and furnished by the Craces to designs by Pugin in his Houses of Parliament style, for the Home Farm, a model farm, which was to be in the forefront of the Victorian industrialised High Farming, and for the gardens which have their own Grade I listing on the Cadw/ICOMOS Register of Parks and Gardens of Special Historic Interest in Wales. Leighton Hall was also the birthplace of the much disparaged hybrid Cupressocyparis leylandii hedge tree. The hall is in private ownership and is not accessible to the public, although it can still be viewed from the road. The home farm is currently under restoration.

== History ==
=== The Earlier House and Deer Park ===
The estate was originally in the ownership of the Corbett or Corbet family and passed by marriage to the Lloyds. A half-timbered house was built for Humphrey Lloyd, High Sheriff of Montgomeryshire in about 1541. Lloyd was elected the M.P. for Montgomeryshire in 1545 and 1547. The house then passed back to Sir Uvedale Corbet in around 1650 and a detailed map of the Leighton Estates in 1663, by William Fowler, exists in the Powis Castle Archives at the National Library of Wales. The map shows The Inheritance of Sir Richard Corbett and the Manor of Leighton. A deer park is believed to have been established in the north park within this period, the park itself extending west and south to Kingswood village. Sir Richard, Uvedale Corbet's son, took advantage of the wooded eastern slopes of the park in the early eighteenth century, felling large areas of oak for sale to the Admiralty.

=== Purchase by the Naylors ===
In 1845, the Leighton Hall estate was purchased from the Corbett family of Longnor Hall, Shropshire, by the Liverpool banker, Christopher Leyland. In 1847, he gave it as a wedding present to his nephew John Naylor (1813–1889), who then proceeded to rebuild the house and estate at a reputed cost of £275,000, plus an additional £200,000 on the farm technology. After John Naylor's death in 1889, his widow continued to live at Leighton until 1909, when parts of the estate were sold. A second sale in 1931, when the house, park, estate buildings and woodlands were sold, saw its final demise as a single entity.

== The Leyland/Naylor Family ==
The great wealth of the Naylor family was derived from the slave trading and banking activities of Thomas Leyland (1752–1827). Christopher Bullin, a Staffordshire Ware merchant, married Thomas Leyland's sister Margaret. Bullin became bankrupt in 1778 and Leyland acquired his premises. Thomas Leyland appears to have had a great regard for his sister's two sons, Richard and Christopher Bullin and her daughter Dorothy. In 1807 Thomas Leyland set up with Richard Bullin, the Leyland and Bullin Bank in Liverpool, which was changed in 1809 to Leyland and Bullins when Christopher Bullin became a partner. In 1809 Dorothy married John Naylor of Hartford Hill, Cheshire. Hartford Hill was then in Great Budworth Parish, but became part of Hartford parish, and Hartford Hill became known as Hartford Grange and is presently the Grange School.

John Naylor and Dorothy had four children, Elizabeth, Thomas, John and Richard Christopher. On his death in 1827 Thomas Leyland instructed that his property should go to the lawful male heirs of his nephews Richard and Christopher Bullin, and, failing that, to the male heirs of his niece Dorothy, namely Thomas, John and Richard Christopher Naylor. After the death of Christopher Bullin in 1849, Thomas, John and Richard Christopher Naylor became partners in the Bank, after being sent to Eton and Cambridge. Thomas Naylor inherited name of Leyland and the wealth that went with it, including Walton Hall, Liverpool. Richard Christopher Naylor purchased Hooton Hall in 1849, which he extensively re-built and also established an important horse racing stud. He was very involved in the banking side of Leyland and Bullins Bank, and built the Albany in Liverpool. In 1843, he also acquired Nantclwyd Hall in Denbighshire, which has become the main family seat. Richard's branch of the family now also own Milton Hall in Cambridgeshire.

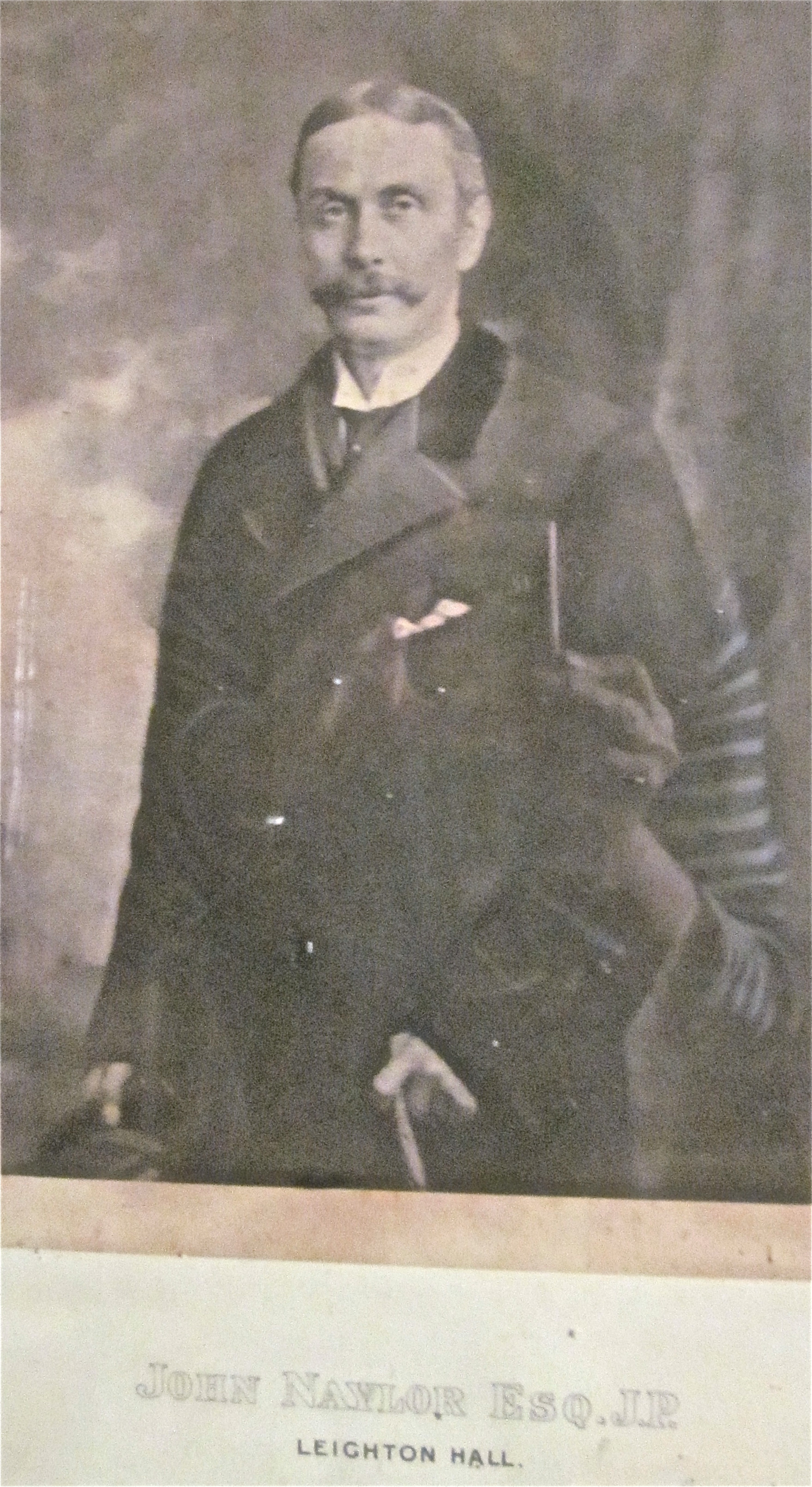
Print of John Naylor JP of Leighton Hall c.1870.

=== John Naylor (1813–1889) ===
John Naylor was born to John Naylor and Dorothy Bullin on 15 April 1813 in Mount Pleasant, Liverpool. He was three years old when his father died and the family went to live with Dorothy's brother Richard Bullin in Liverpool. John was educated at Eton College around 1826–32 and then spent three years at Trinity College, Cambridge. On 20 August 1846, John Naylor married Georgiana Edwards, the daughter of John Edwards of Ness Strange, Shropshire. Georgiana was descended from the Duke of Athol. John and Georgiana had ten children: Dora b.1847, Margaret b.1848, Christopher John b.1849, Rowland b.1851, Emily b.1853, Georgina b.1854, John [Jack] b.1856, Frances b.1857, Eva b.1859 & Maud b.1863.

Following their marriage, John and Georgiana went to live at Liscard Manor, Wallasey. It seems that John was also developing his farming interests at Hartford Hill. In 1844, John became a partner of Leyland Bullins Bank on the death of his uncle Richard Leyland (Bullin) From Richard Leyland, John inherited the Brynllywarch Estate in Kerry in Montgomeryshire. In 1845, John's uncle Christopher Leyland (Bullin) purchased the Leighton Estate for £85,503 12s 7p, which he gave to John and Georgiana as a wedding present. On 13 July 1889, John Naylor died at the age of seventy-six.

=== Christopher John Naylor/Leyland (1849–1926) ===
Christopher John Naylor a naval officer and silviculturist, was born at Liscard, Wallasey, Cheshire, on 19 September 1849, the eldest of three sons and the seven daughters of John Naylor and Georgiana. He grew up at Leighton. Naylor inherited a love of the sea and sailing from his father (a member of the Royal Yacht Squadron and owner of the schooner Sabrina). He entered the Britannia Royal Naval College at Dartmouth, at the age of thirteen. He sailed as a midshipman on the Victoria, a three-decker, fitted with steam engines, which was the flagship of the commander-in-chief, Mediterranean. He saw brief service in the Pacific before joining the frigate Liverpool. Finally he went to the China Seas in temporary command of a gunboat. He left the Navy as a sub-lieutenant in 1872. In 1874 he married Everhilda Elizabeth Creyke (1851–1890), of Rawcliffe Hall, in Yorkshire, and they lived at Trelystan, close to Leighton Hall. His daughter, Hilda Georgina Leyland, married Richard Vernon Cholmondeley. He was a partner at Leyland and Bullins bank from 1879 until 1901. In 1889 Christopher John Naylor inherited the Leighton and Brynllywarch estates from his father, which he made over to his brothers and their heirs in 1891, on the death of his uncle Thomas Leyland. He also inherited the Haggerston Castle estate and changed his name from Naylor to Leyland in 1893. He moved to Haggerston and set out to create an estate with buildings that would more than rival those at Leighton. As a result of Christopher John inheriting Haggerston, John (known as Jack Naylor) became the owner of Leighton Hall and his brother Rowland Naylor the owner of the Brynllyarch Estate in Kerry, Powys. Nantclwyd Hall was now given to Thomas Leyland, son of Thomas Leyland, who had been disinherited. Haggerston, Leighton and Brynllywarch, were kept within the Leyland entailed estates, but Nantclwyd appears to have been outside the Entailed Estates. John (Jack) Naylor died in 1906 and his son John (Murray) Naylor inherited Leighton Hall.

=== Disposal and later ownership ===
By 1930, the Leyland entailed estates were experiencing considerable financial difficulties and the Leighton Estate, and Haggerston were all put up for auction while Brynllywarch had been sold in 1920. At Leighton, the North West Park was broken up into large and small parcels of land and with their associated dwellings auctioned off in separate lots to private buyers. The Home Farm and associated lands were sold to the Montgomeryshire County Council, who had already purchased the Brynllywarch Estate. A separate auction sale of the furnishings and furniture of the Hall was held by Harrods. The Hall and Gardens were purchased back by the daughter of John Naylor, Georgina, who continued to live at the Hall until her death in 1950. Leighton Hall was then sold to the Canadian Senator and newspaper owner Rupert Davies, who owned Leighton Hall until his death in 1967. It was subsequently used as a school and an arts foundation and was sold again in 1996.

== Leighton Hall ==
The hall was rebuilt on the site of the former house in a Gothic style between 1850 and 1856. The work was supervised by Liverpool architect W H Gee, possibly to the designs of James Kellaway Colling, who worked extensively for the Naylor family. The house consists of a main range with a clock tower in front, which provides an entrance porch. A short library wing is to the south and a longer north wing. Behind the main range, parallel to the north wing, is an L-plan service wing incorporating the main stairway. This forms two sides of a courtyard at the rear. The hall is full-height, the wings are 2-storey with attics. To the east is the tall six storey octagonal tower with a projecting circular staircase, built in 1854–5, which dominates the house. The house is built of brick, but the main elevations are faced in coursed, rock-faced stone ashlar dressings from Cefn near Minera. The stone chimney stacks have tall patterned chimneys. These were probably made by John Marriott Blashfield of Stamford, Lincolnshire, who supplied terracotta for the Naylors at Garthmyl Hall, Berriew.

The interior designs were by Augustus Pugin in Pugin's Houses of Parliament style. with the Craces arranging the interior furnishings and decoration. There are Minton floor tiles and stained glass probably by Forrest and Bromley who made the glass for Leighton church. The great hall was designed to display Naylor's collection of paintings and sculpture, which included works by Turner, Landseer, Delaroche and Ansdell. The Great hall has a hammerbeam roof with a frieze of Welsh family coats of arms and a fireplace by Pugin. The Great Hall also contained sculptures by Siddon and McBride which are now in the Walker Art Gallery in Liverpool. The hall is a Grade I listed building.

== Gardens ==
Naylor commissioned Edward Kemp, a pupil of Sir Joseph Paxton, to lay out the gardens from 1850 onwards. The gardens, now largely derelict, are of many kinds, from woodland to formal, arranged as a number of set-pieces with pools and stone sculptures linked by broad paths. They are listed Grade I on the Cadw/ICOMOS Register of Parks and Gardens of Special Historic Interest in Wales. A dry bridge leads from the library garden and the tower across a hollow to the main walk and over another bridge (carvings of creatures including an elephant). Below is a figure of Icarus falling headlong through the surface of a pond. The revised Powys Pevsner lists the statue as being in situ, following the original edition. It was in fact removed in the 1990s when the then owners of Leighton sought to sell it. Stored by Powys Council for 25 years, it is now due to be returned to the gardens. A Grade II listed structure, it was sculpted by Hippolyte Ferrat. At the end is a view to the spire of Leighton church, and another bridge leads back to the house. The High Bridge (1858), a lofty viaduct taking a high road above the valley has been demolished. In 1874 Kemp laid out a decorative water cascade fed from a series of lakes, which sequenced down from the Moel y Mab on Long Mountain. He then developed the estate's Park Wood, making use—like many Victorians of the time—of exotic species including monkey puzzle trees. The 1857 Charles Ackers Memorial Redwood grove – the largest and oldest grove of coast redwoods in Europe – and the historic Naylor pinetum are today listed Grade 1 locations, now managed by the Royal Forestry Society.

=== × Cupressocyparis leylandii ===
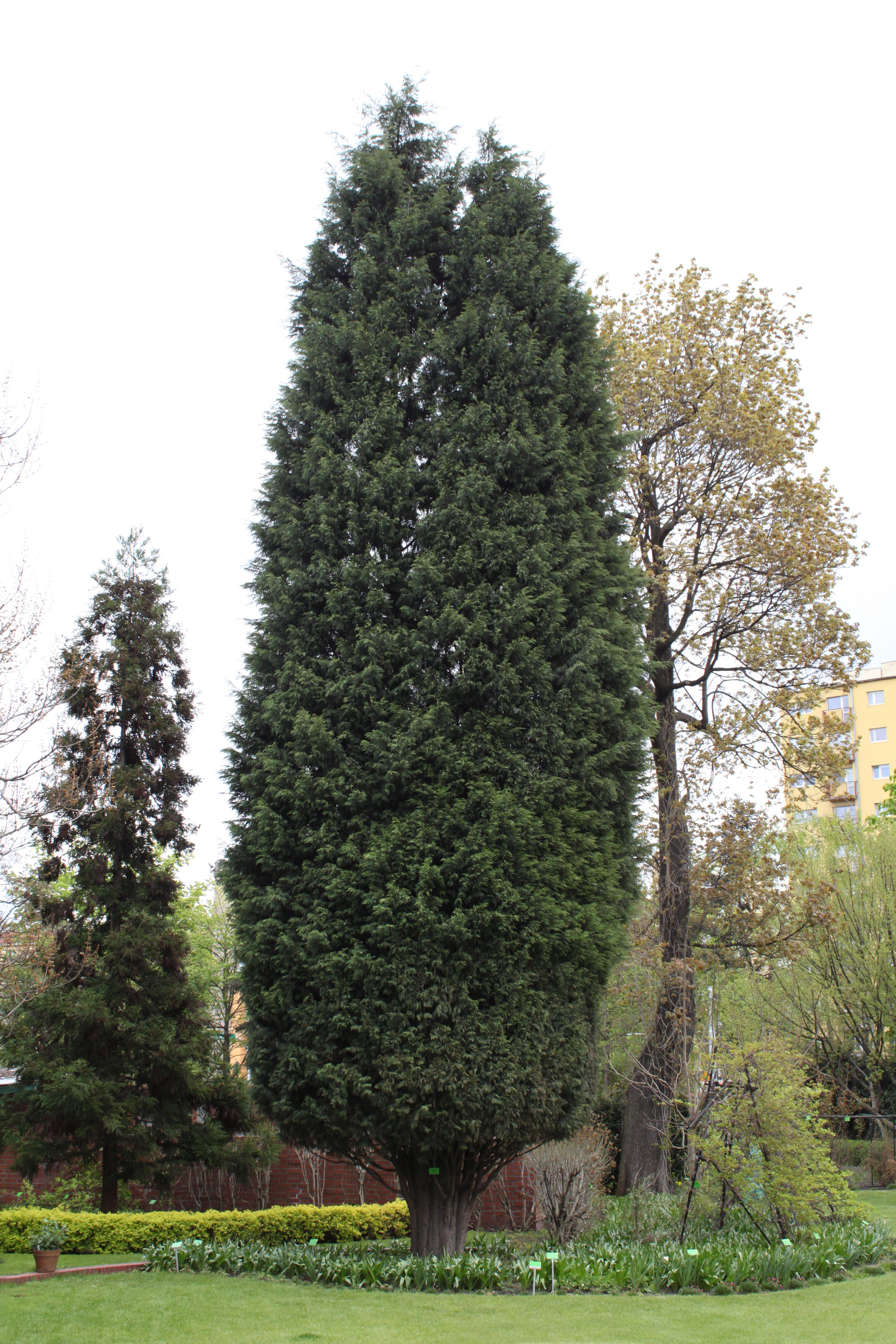
Cupressocyparis leylandii 'Naylor's Blue' OB Wrocław

Kemp in his garden layout had placed two disparate Pacific coast North American species of conifers in close proximity to each other: Monterey Cypress, Cupressus macrocarpa (syn. Callitropsis macrocarpa) from California and Nootka Cypress or Alaskan Cypress Cupressus nootkatensis (syn. Callitropsis nootkatensis), family Cupressaceae

The two parent species would never have met in the wild as their natural ranges are thousands of miles apart, but in 1888 the hybrid cross occurred when the female cones of Nootka Cypress were fertilised by pollen from Monterey Cypress, to create the first X Cupressocyparis leylandii. Christopher John Naylor (1849–1926) inherited Leighton Hall from his father in 1889. Then, in 1891, Christopher John inherited Haggerston Castle from his uncle Thomas Leyland (née Naylor), and he changed his surname to Leyland, and moved to Haggerston Castle in Northumberland. He further developed the hybrid at Haggerston, and named the first clone variant Haggerston Grey. Leighton Hall then passed to his younger brother John Naylor (1856–1906), and when, in 1911, the reverse hybrid of the cones of the Monterey Cypress were fertilised with pollen from the Nootka, that hybrid was baptised Leighton Green.

== Home Farm: Model Farm Buildings ==
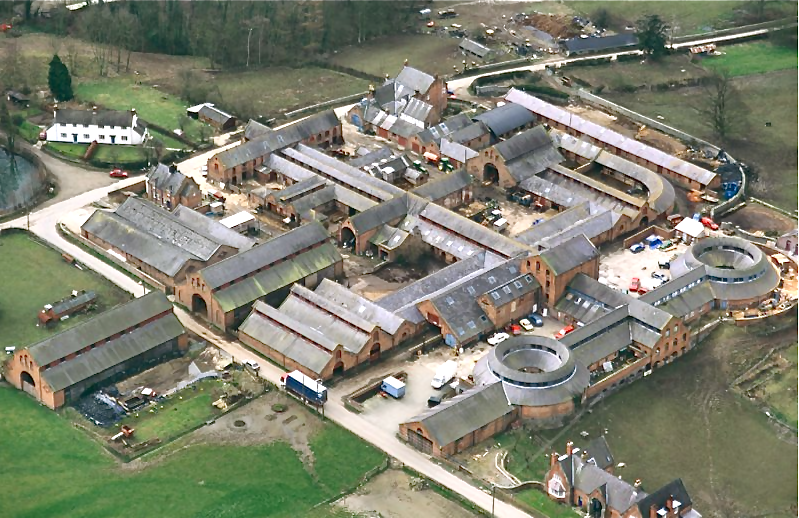

Leighton Home Farm
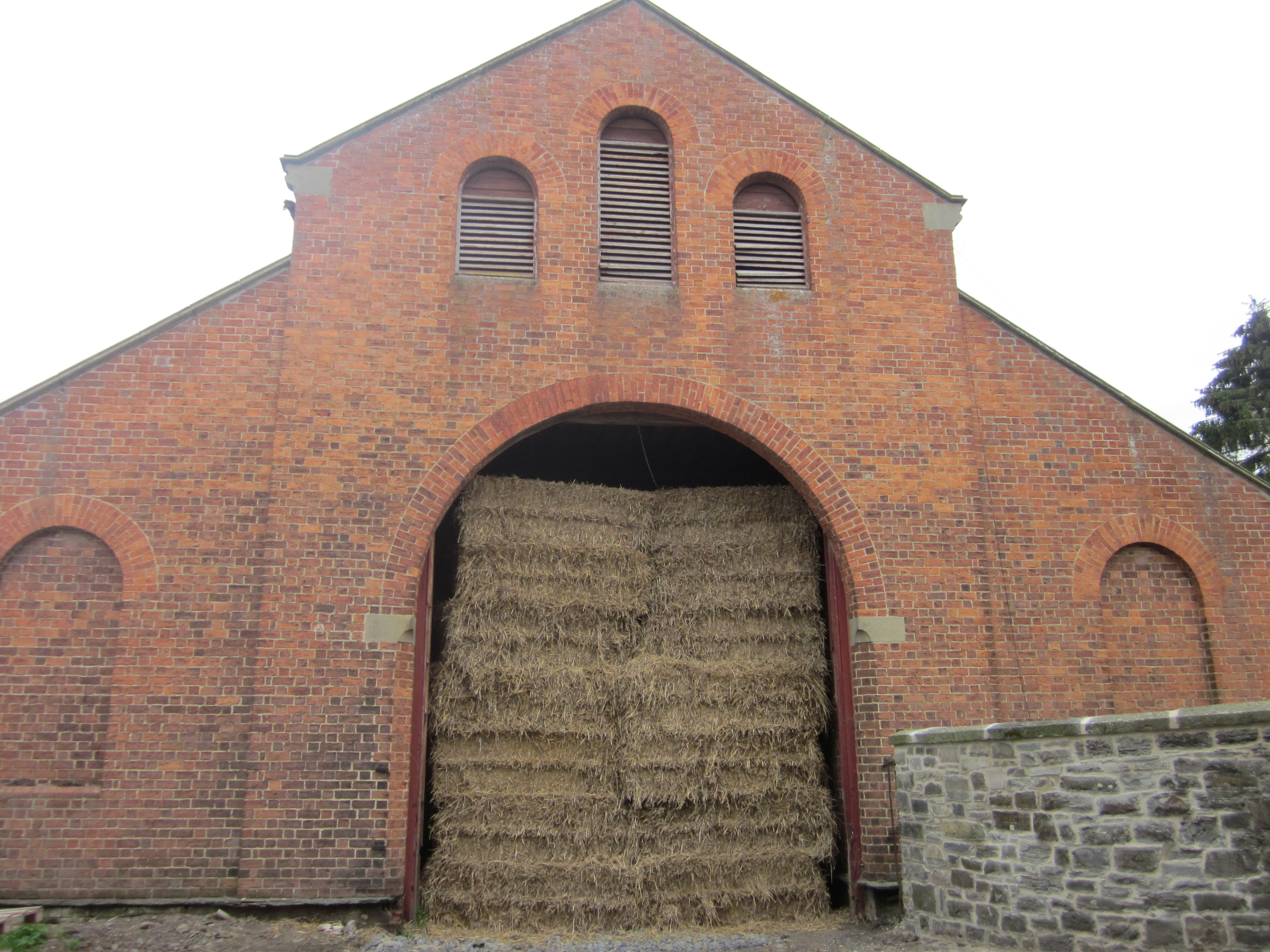
- Leighton Home Farm Hay Barn
- Interactive map of Leighton Home Farm

History
- Built: Model Farm 1847-c.1860

Site notes
- Architect: Poundley and Walker
- Architectural style: 19th century Model Farm

Listed Building – Grade II*

The Leighton Model Farm or Home Farm near Welshpool in Montgomeryshire was a pioneering Victorian farm built on an industrial scale. It was built between 1847 and the early 1860s for John Naylor of Leighton Hall to designs by the estate architects Poundley and Walker. It consists of a rectangular complex of red brick buildings, which includes 12 listed buildings, of which 10 are Grade II* listed buildings and two are Grade II. The farm was a gradual development structured either side of a central E-W axis in which a threshing barn was built with hay and fodder storage buildings either side of it, all of which were linked by a broad gauge railway. On the N and S sides of this axis stockyards were built, served by 2 N-S service roads. Naylor spent £200,000 between 1848 and 1856 on developing the 4000-acre (1.620ha) farm on industrial principles. John Naylor's grandson, Captain J.M. Naylor, sold the estate in 1931, when the Leighton Farm was bought by Montgomeryshire County Council and subsequently split up into small industrial units and smallholdings. In 2010 the Potter Group of Welshpool purchased the historic Leighton Home Farm Complex. The formal transfer of the Victorian model farm, with seven houses and 200 acres of land, was completed between Powys County Council and James Potter, the managing director of Potter Group. This has paved the way for a comprehensive restoration programme of the Grade II* listed buildings which is currently proceeding, and has been grant aided by Cadw. James Potter's long term proposal is to create an equine centre at Leighton, building on his current National Hunt interests, and presents possibilities for future regeneration in the Welshpool area. In August 2013 Yorton Farm, a stud farm in Shropshire, announced it is relocating its entire operation, including its four stallions, to Leighton Farm Buildings. Owners David and Teresa Futter have integrated stables and stud facilities into the existing Home Farm buildings.

=== Comparative Model and Industrial Farms ===
The Model Farms of the Georgian period were designed by architects, in contrast to local vernacular layouts, and were normally in close proximity to major country houses. They were arranged around a square or rectangular farmyard, and the buildings were of Classical design. A change occurred in the later 1840s and particularly after the passing of the repeal of the Corn Laws in 1846 which ushered in the period of Victorian High Farming, which lasted until about 1870. This led to Model Farms changing to larger industrial farms, which were plainer and more utilitarian in their design, and normally designed by the estate's Land Agent or surveyor. A leading figure in this period was G. A. Dean, a land surveyor who extended the Model Farm for Coke of Norfolk at Holkham (1852–53) and designed the Home Farm in Windsor Great Park for Prince Albert. Dean wrote two books: Essays on the construction of farm buildings and labourers' cottages (1849) and The Land Steward (1851). These outlined the principles of the new model industrial farms. Dean advocated a rectangular layout and the use of tramways for moving feedstuffs for cattle, and recommended that the yards for the animals be open towards the south to let the sunlight in and give the greatest protection from the wind. Elsewhere in Wales the change came around 1850 when the Duke of Beaufort's Farm at Wolvesnewton in Monmouthshire was laid out in a cruciform shape and used a railway track to run through the haybarns to move the feedstuffs. This design was also copied at Ysgubor Coed-oer-le, Bwlch-y-Cibau, near Meifod in Montgomeryshire.

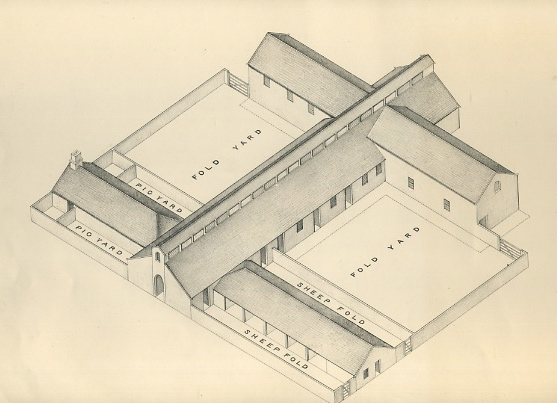
Layout of a steading in Poundleys Cottage Architecture 1857

John Wilkes Poundley, who was John Naylor's estate surveyor at both Leighton and Brynllywarch in Kerry, appears to have anticipated some of Dean's ideas. The use of the cruciform arrangement of the buildings, so the mechanized water-driven power shaft drive could be made available to all the buildings, was in advance of Dean. The circular Pig and Sheep Rotunda were also highly innovative. The Leighton buildings can be compared with the smaller farm steading illustrated in Poundley's Cottage Architecture of 1857, which fairly closely resembles a smaller farm at Upper Pengelli on Naylor's Kerry estate. Leighton Home Farm is also imitated by Home Farm, Courtleaze, Coleshill, Oxfordshire, which was designed and laid out between 1852 and 1854 by E. Moore, Land Agent to the 2nd Earl Radnor.

== Buildings in the Home Farm Complex ==
E. Wilian’s study, Historical Farm Buildings of Wales, contains a plan of the Home Farm layout.

=== Piggery and Sheep Shed or Rotunda ===
These are the two most remarkable buildings in the Home Farm complex and are listed Grade II*. They are at the north-west side of the farm and were built around 1855. The buildings consist of 2 circular sheds both of which are open in the centre; the W shed was a sheep house, the E shed was a piggery. These are joined by a long link range which housed sheep on the N side, facing the fields, and probably cattle on the S side facing the 2 stockyards. The sheep house and piggery has louvres in the vent ridges of the roof. Its inner wall has drains at the internal floor level above a deep sump in which there are 8 radiating tunnels with round-headed openings. The slurry from the animals would drain in to the circular sumps, before being piped away for use as manure to fertilise the estate fields. The timber framing used to construct the very complex structure of the ridge of the circular buildings is remarkable. The roofs drain water both outwards and inwards, into the circular sump. It has been suggested that these circular buildings were developed from similar farm building on model farms in the US, but Wilian illustrates another circular cowhouse at Cae’r lan, Abercraf, Breconshire. This lacks the central sump, but is of the same date

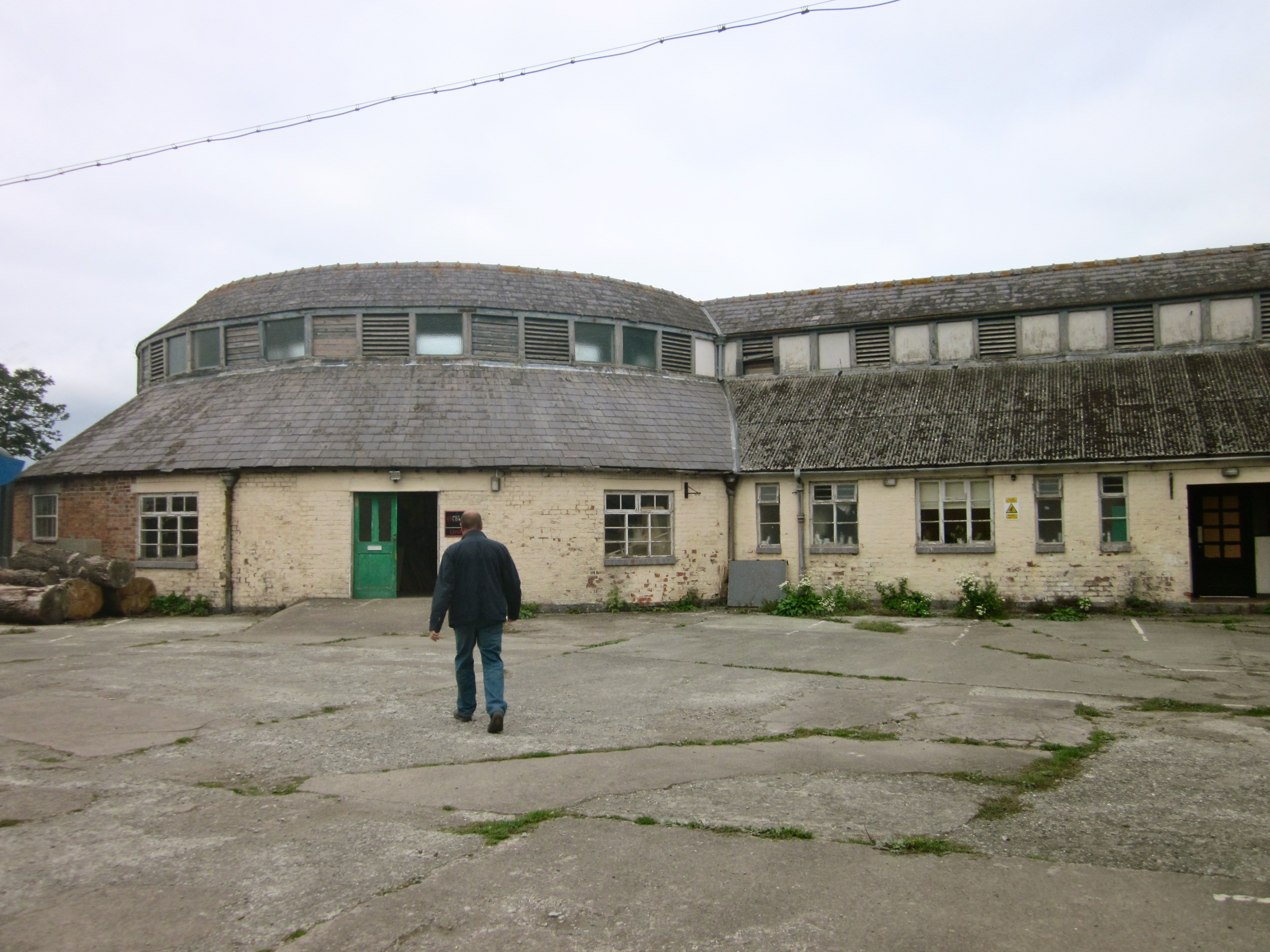
Leighton Home Farm- sheep rotunda

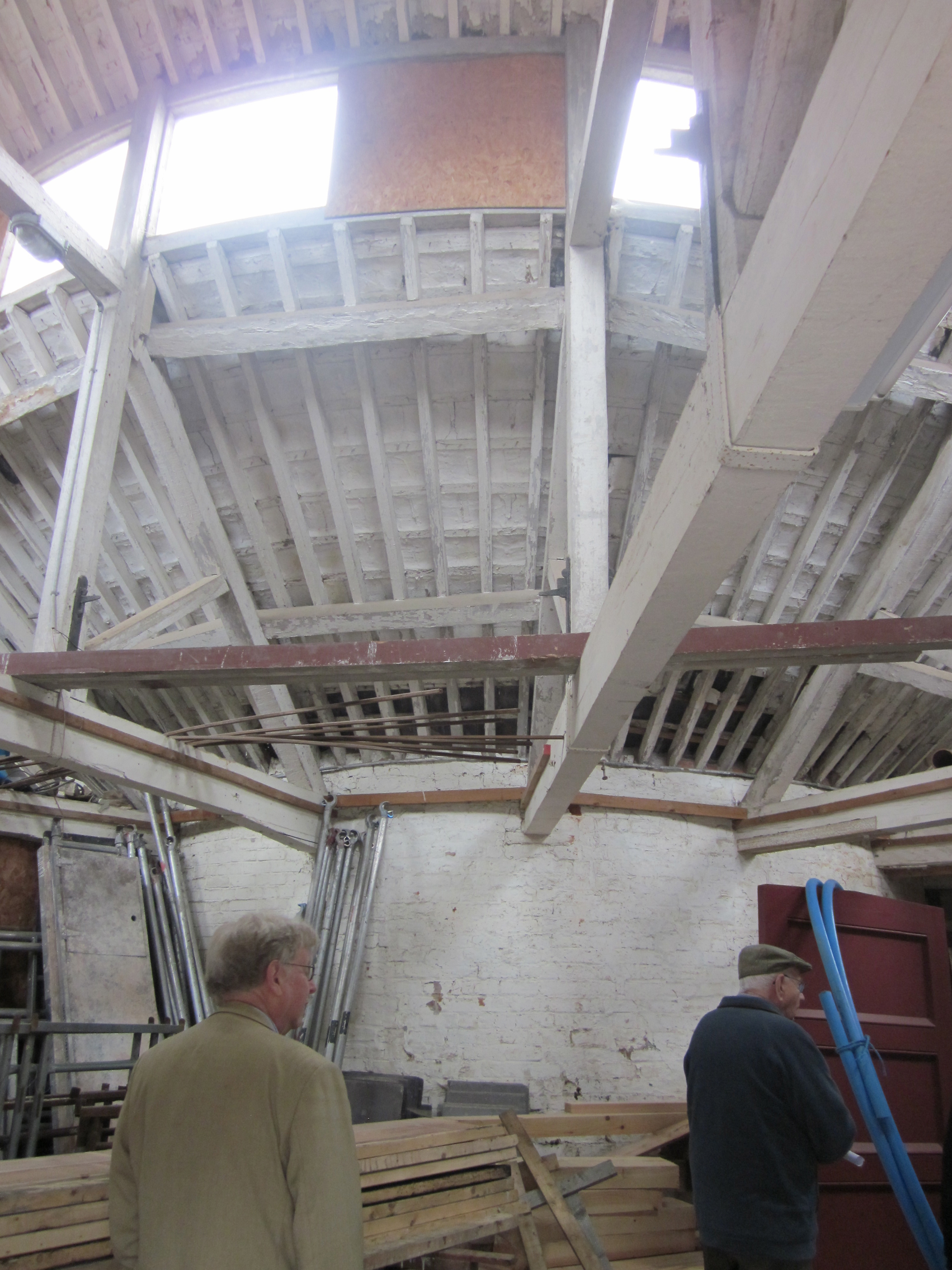
Leighton Farm - interior of Piggery

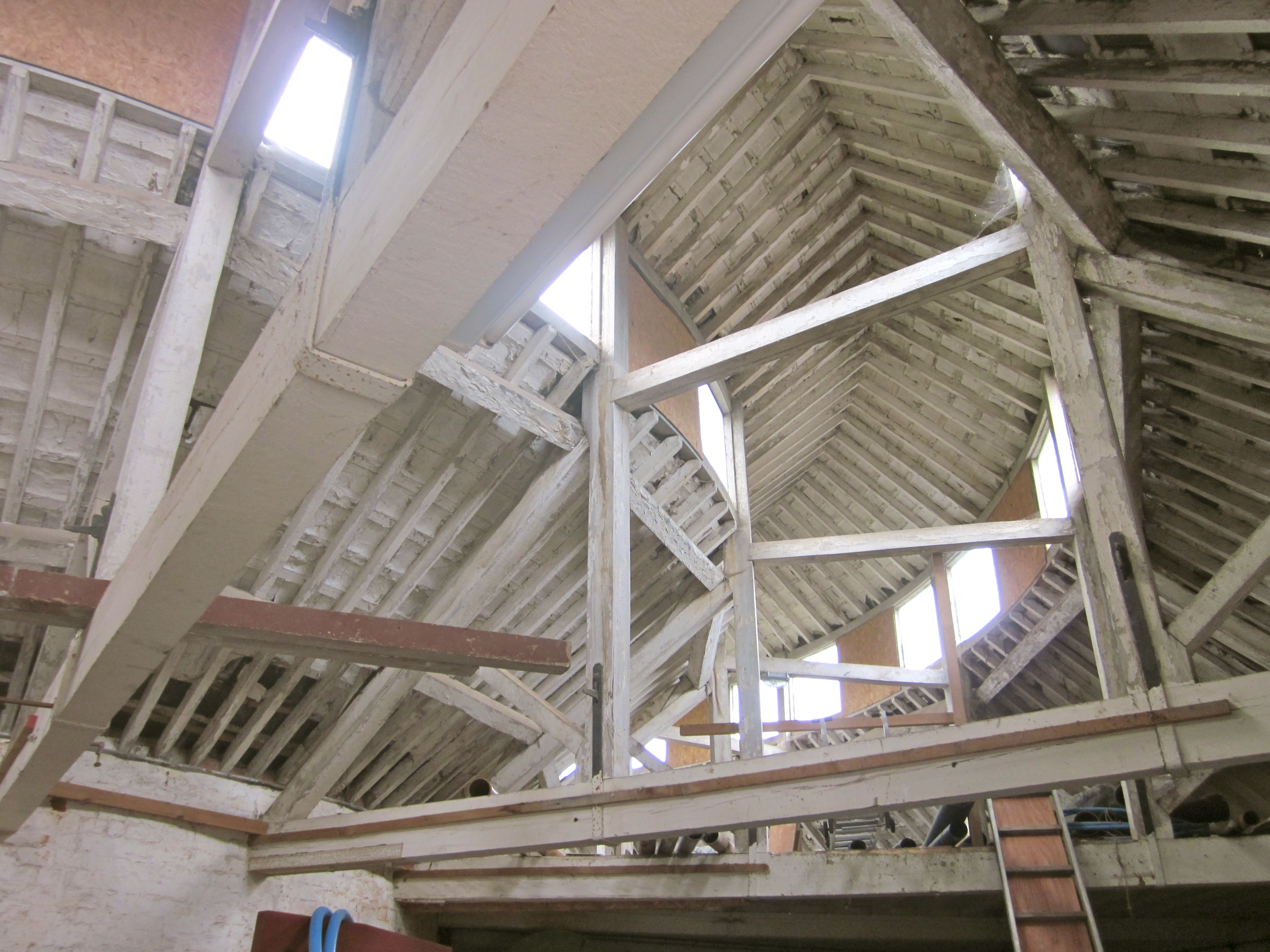
Piggery, Timber framing and roof ventilators

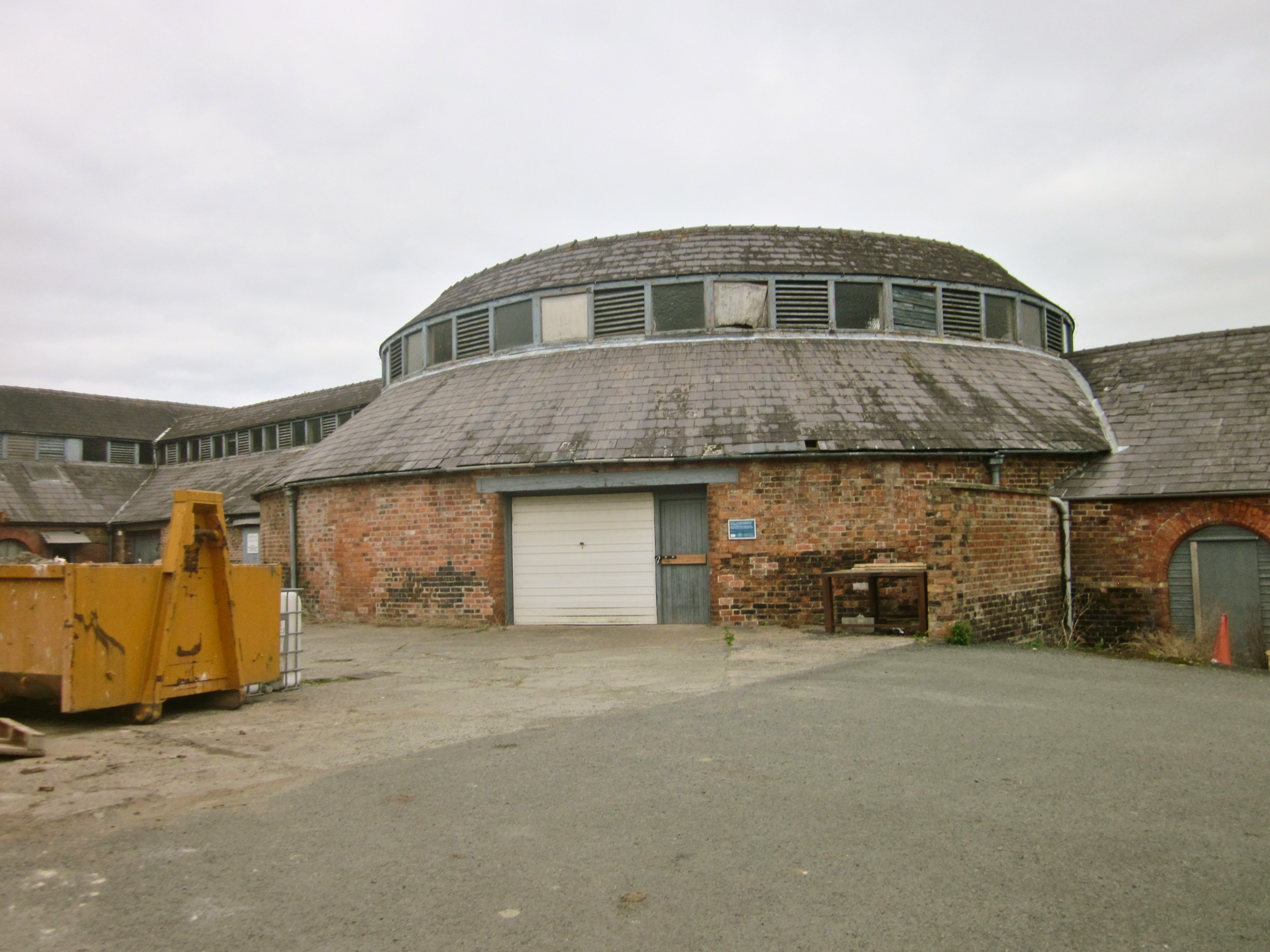
Exterior of Piggery

=== Feedstuffs Mill ===
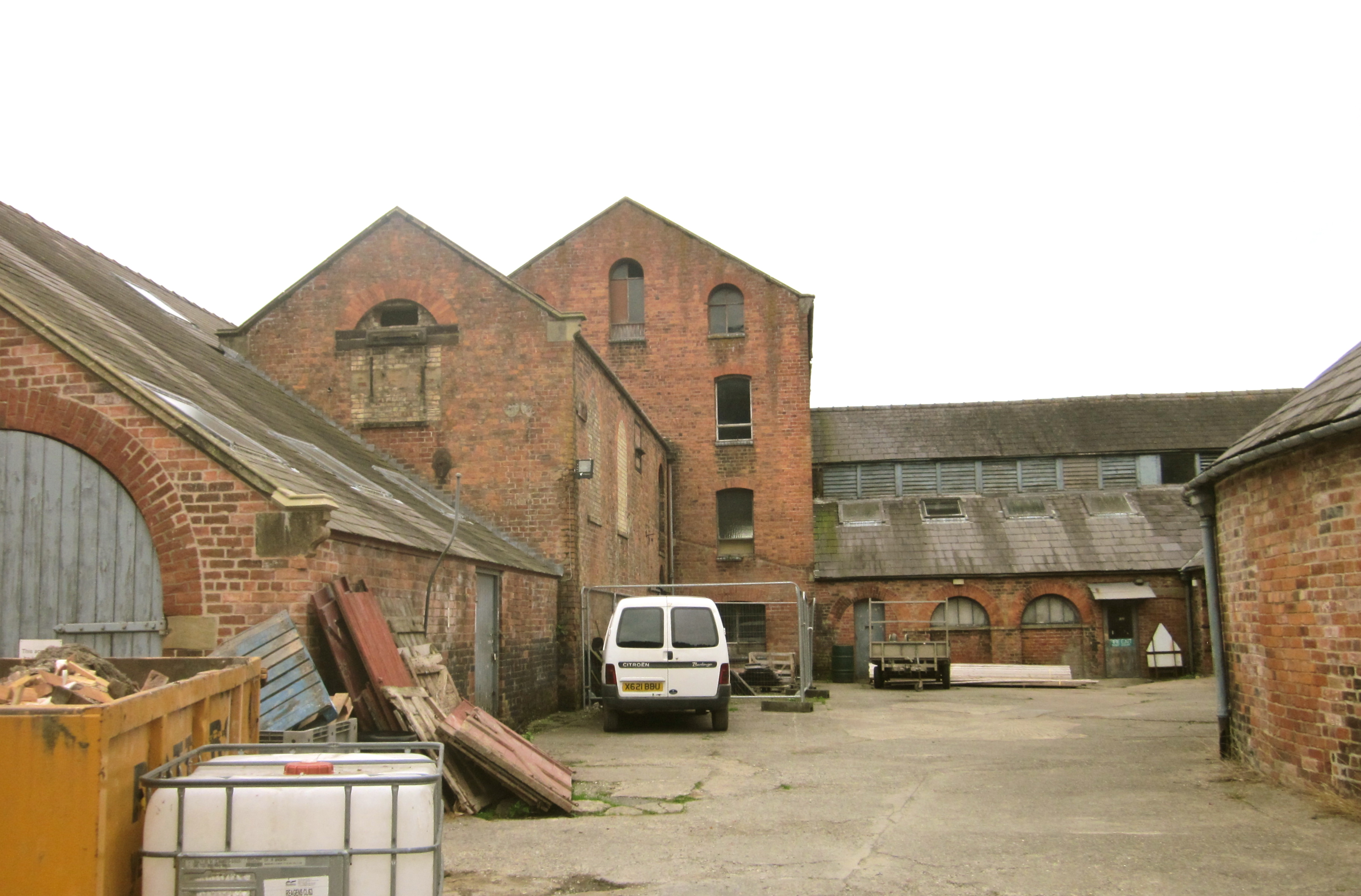
Leighton Home Farm, Feedstuffs Mill from E

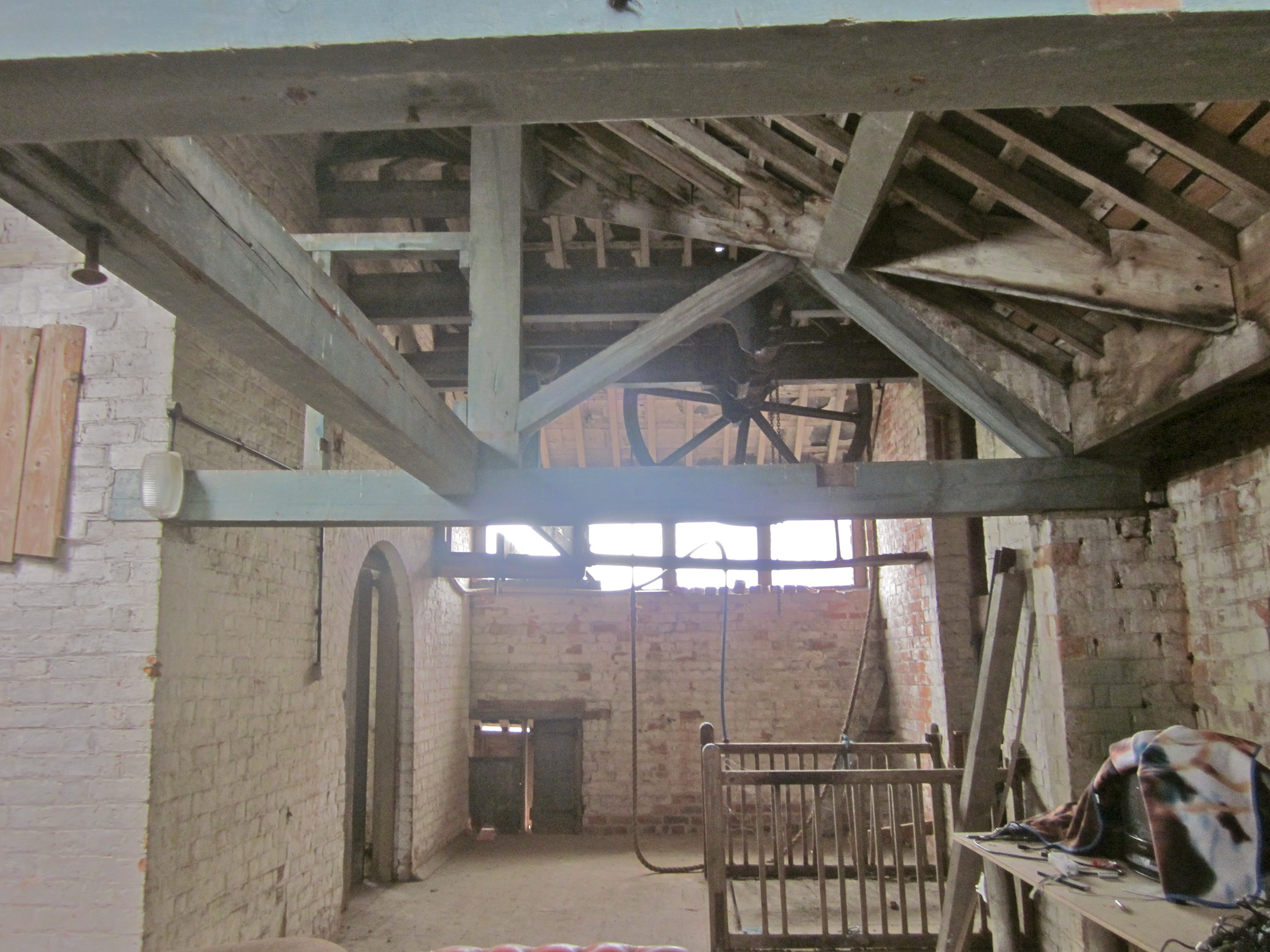
Leighton Home Farm . Sack hoist on upper floor of Feedstuffs Mill

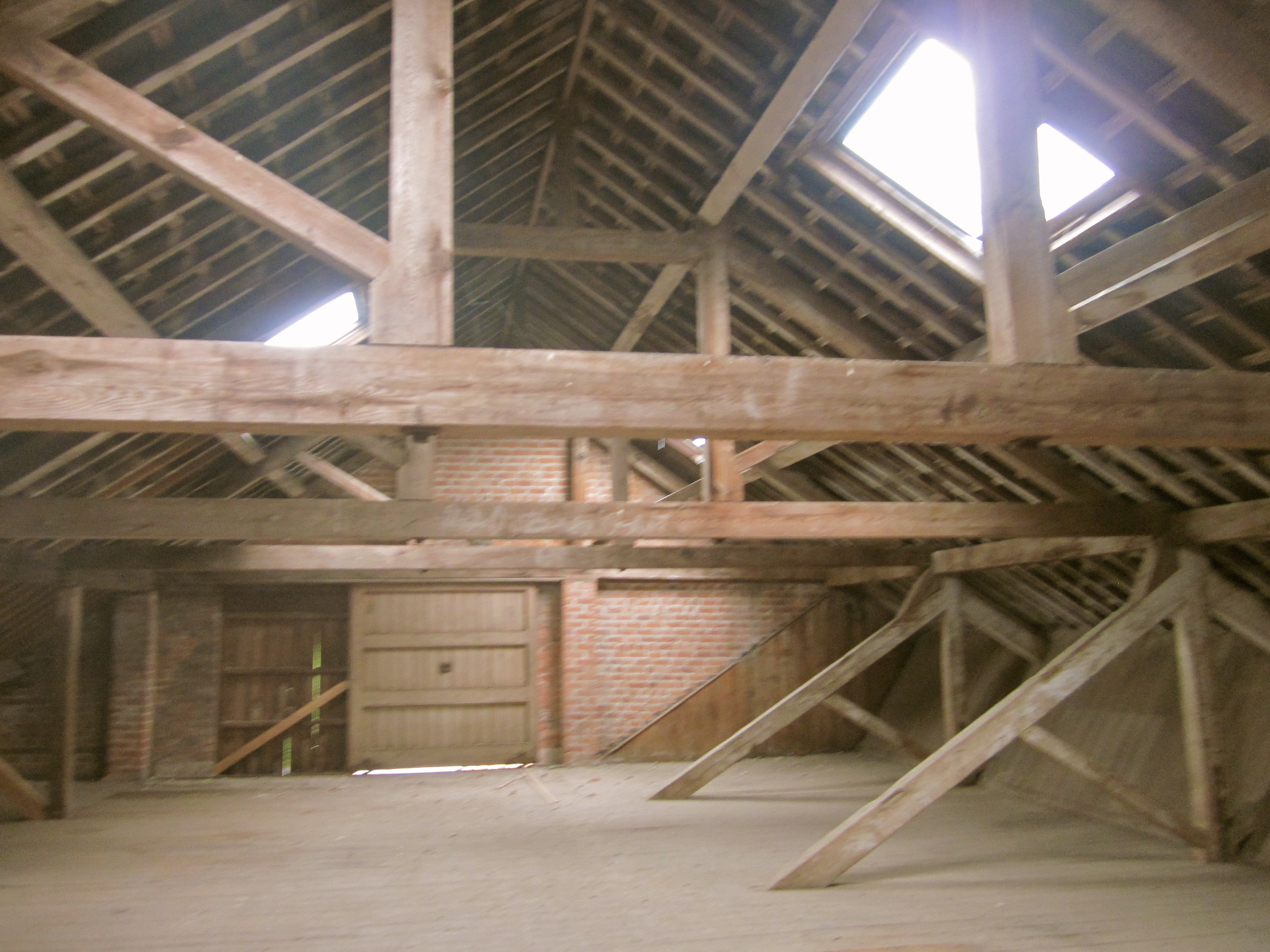
Leighton Upper floor of Feedstuffs Mill

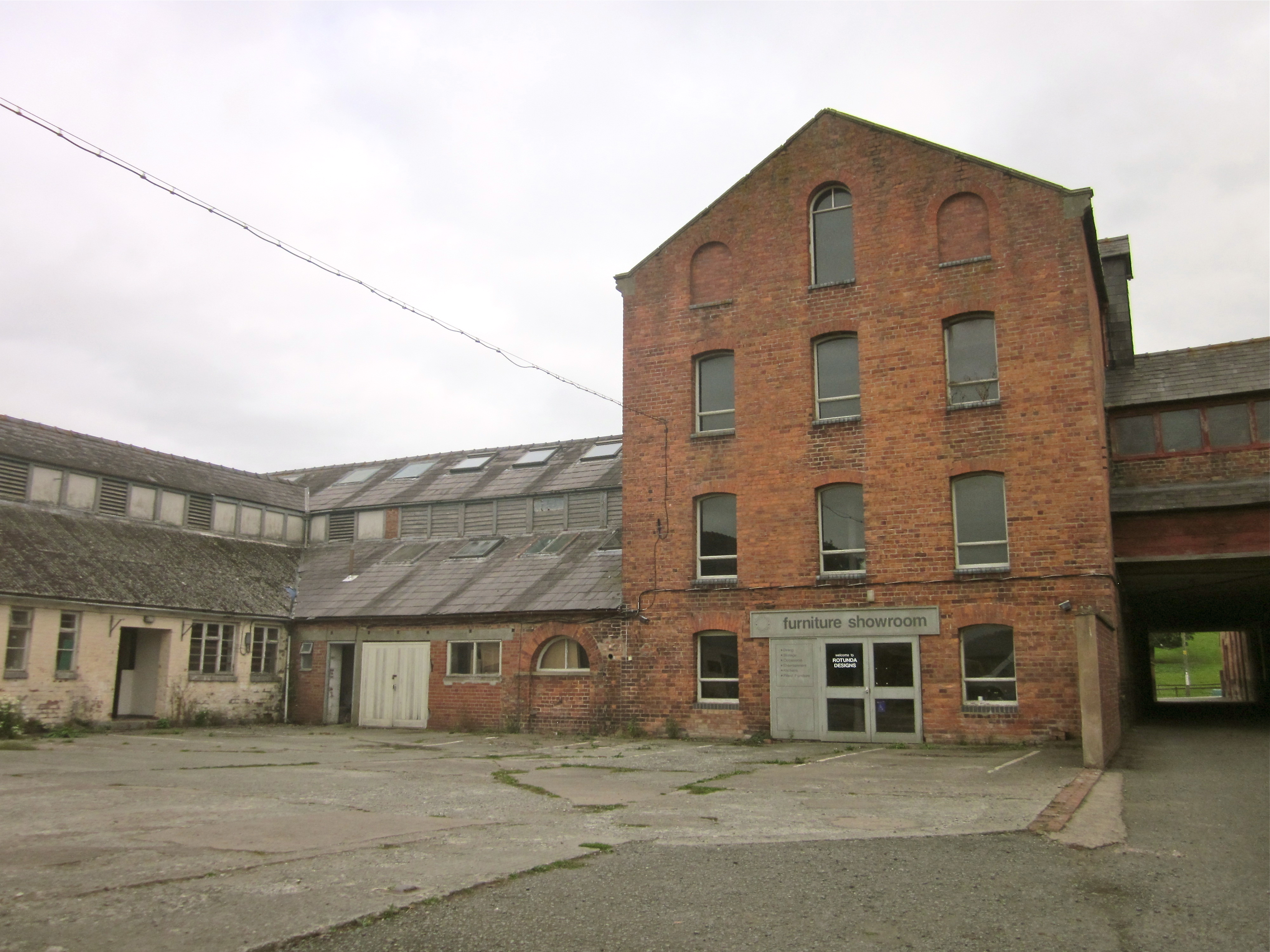
LeightonFarm Feedstuff mill from W

=== Cattle Yards and Stalls ===
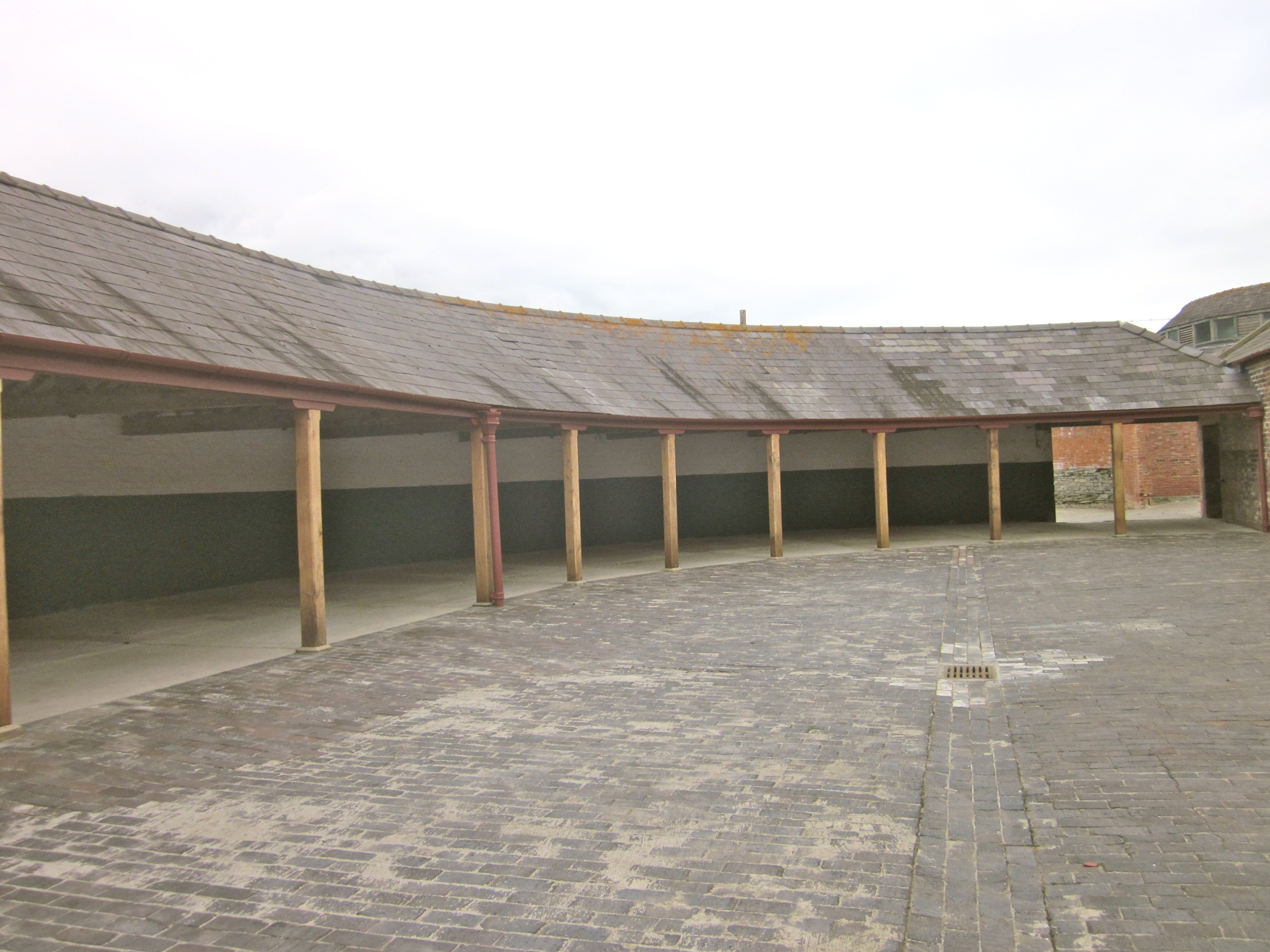
Curved shelter in Stockyard III.

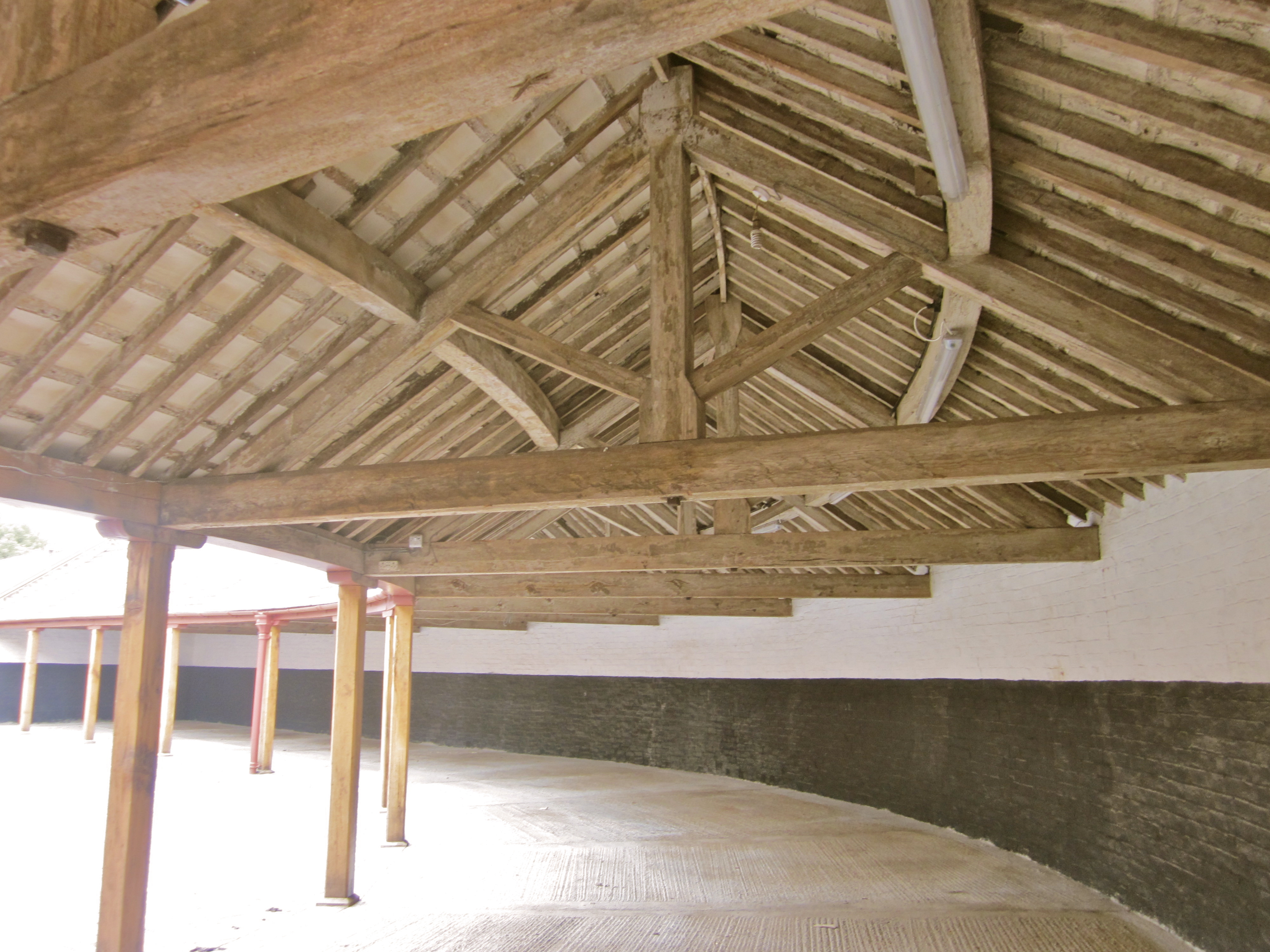
Roof structure in curved stockyard

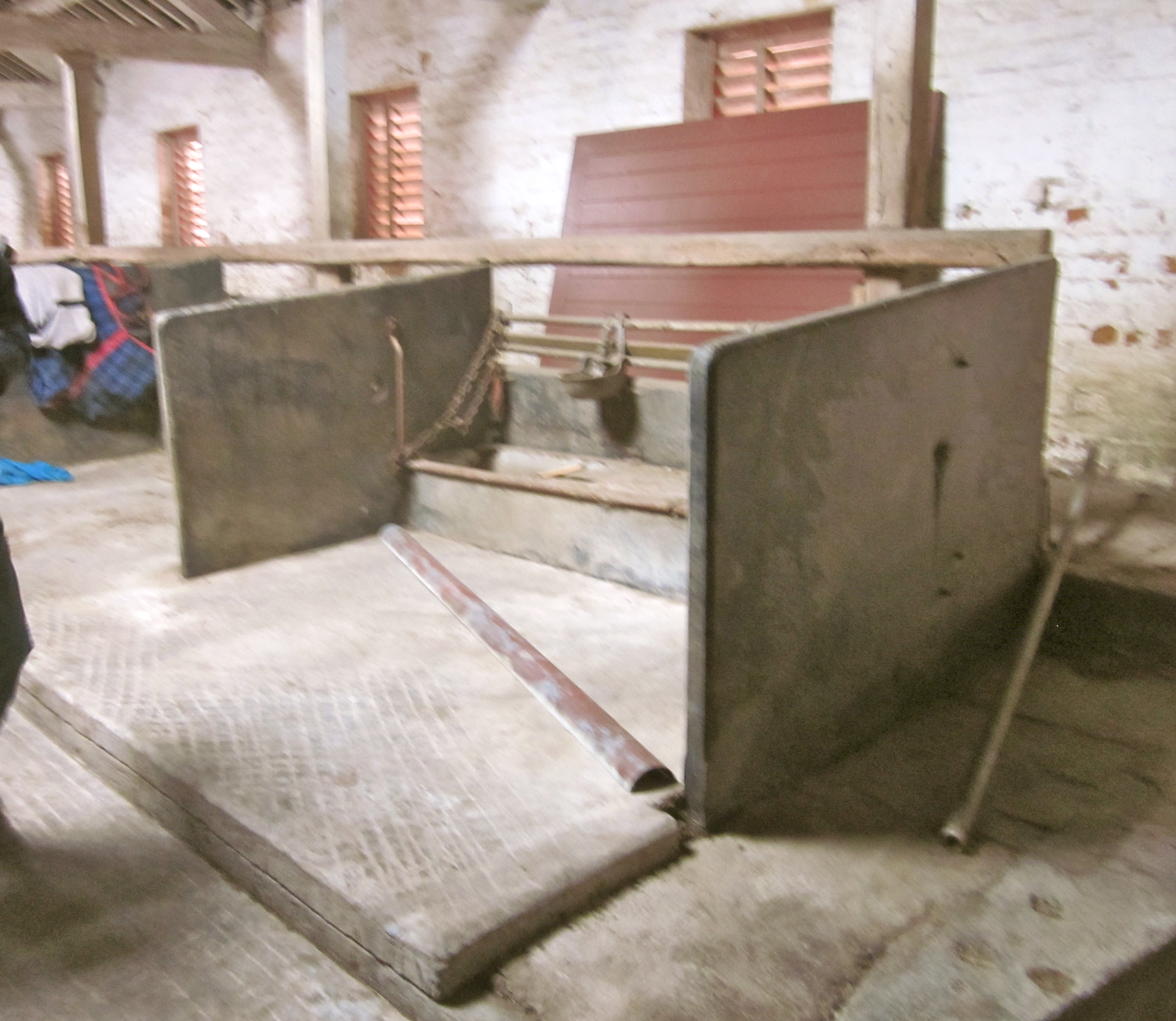
Cattle stalls with slate partition and water trough

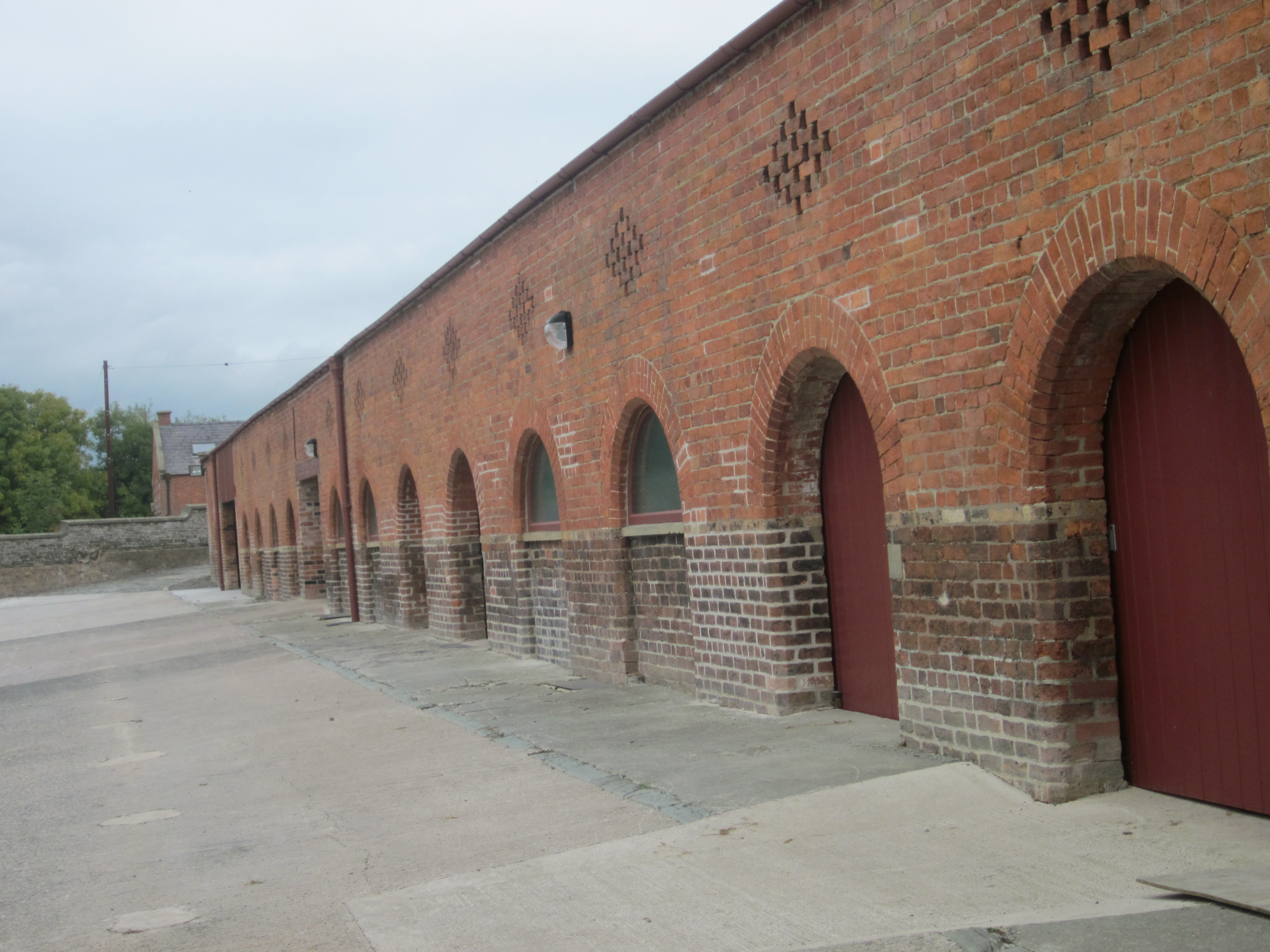
Sheds for accommodation of European Bison.

=== Hay Barns and Root Stores ===
The Hay barns run laterally across the farm complex and have large arched access openings, so the wagons on a railway line could be run through them.

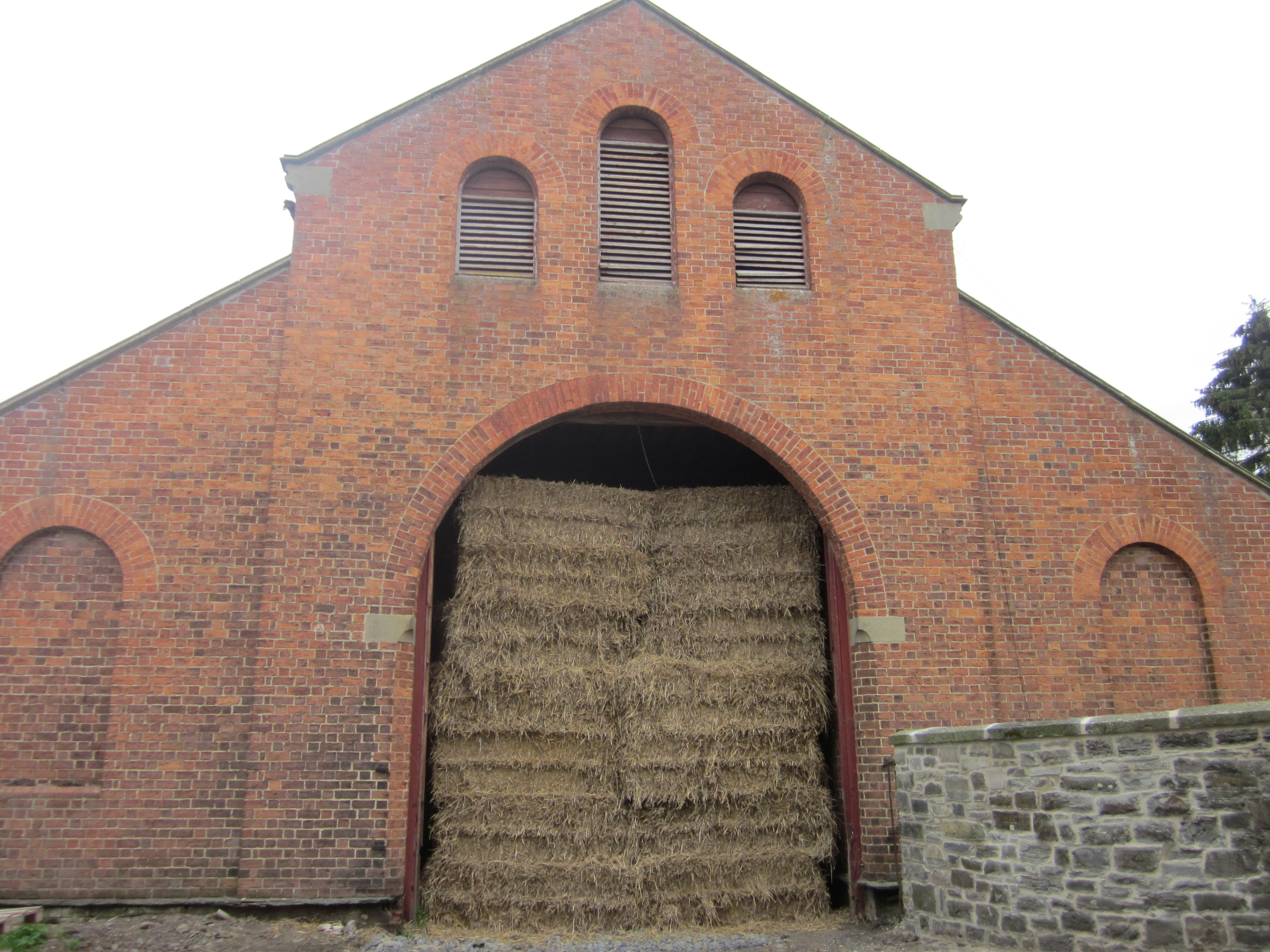
One of four hay barns

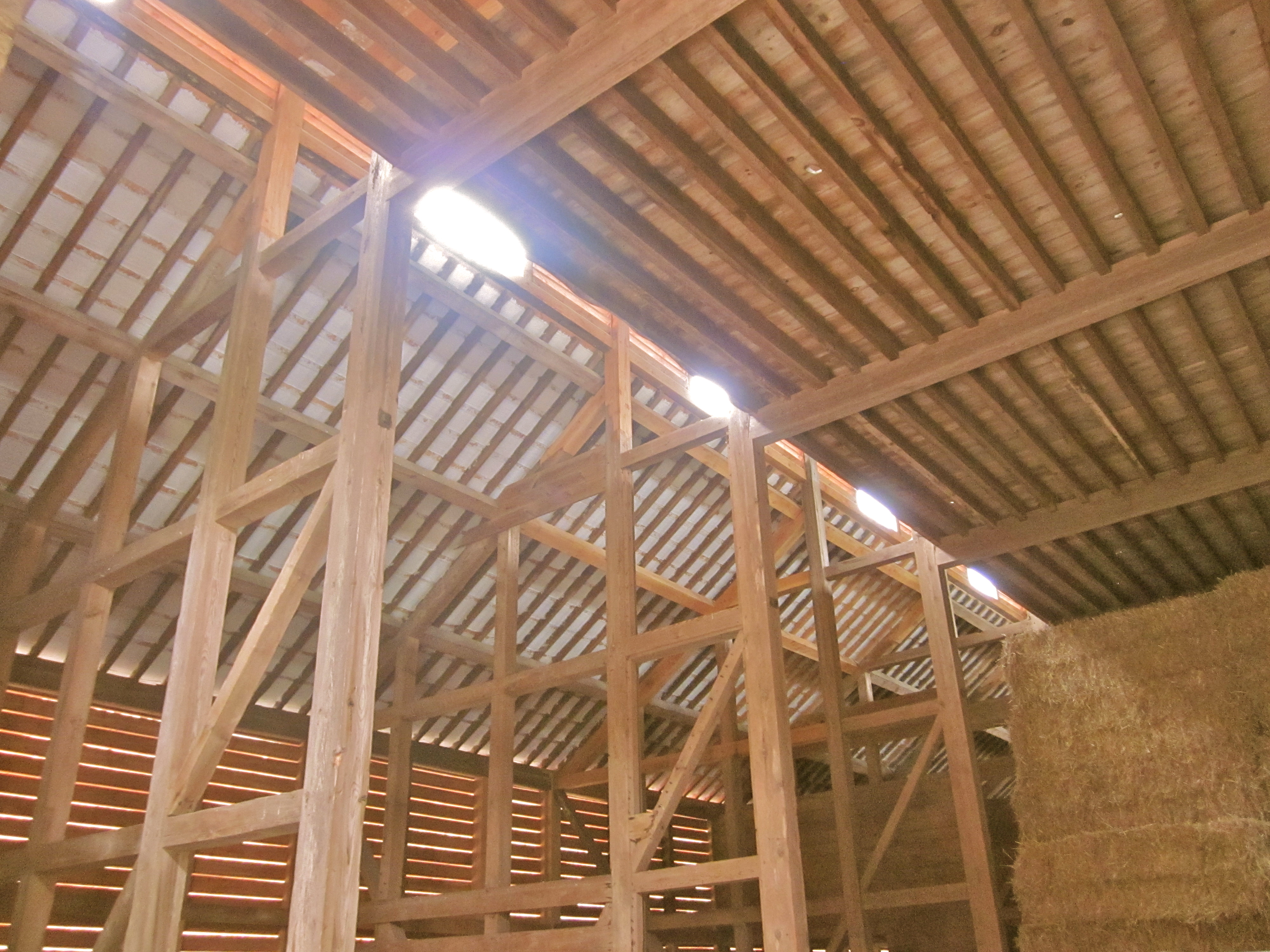
Partitioned storage in Hay Barn

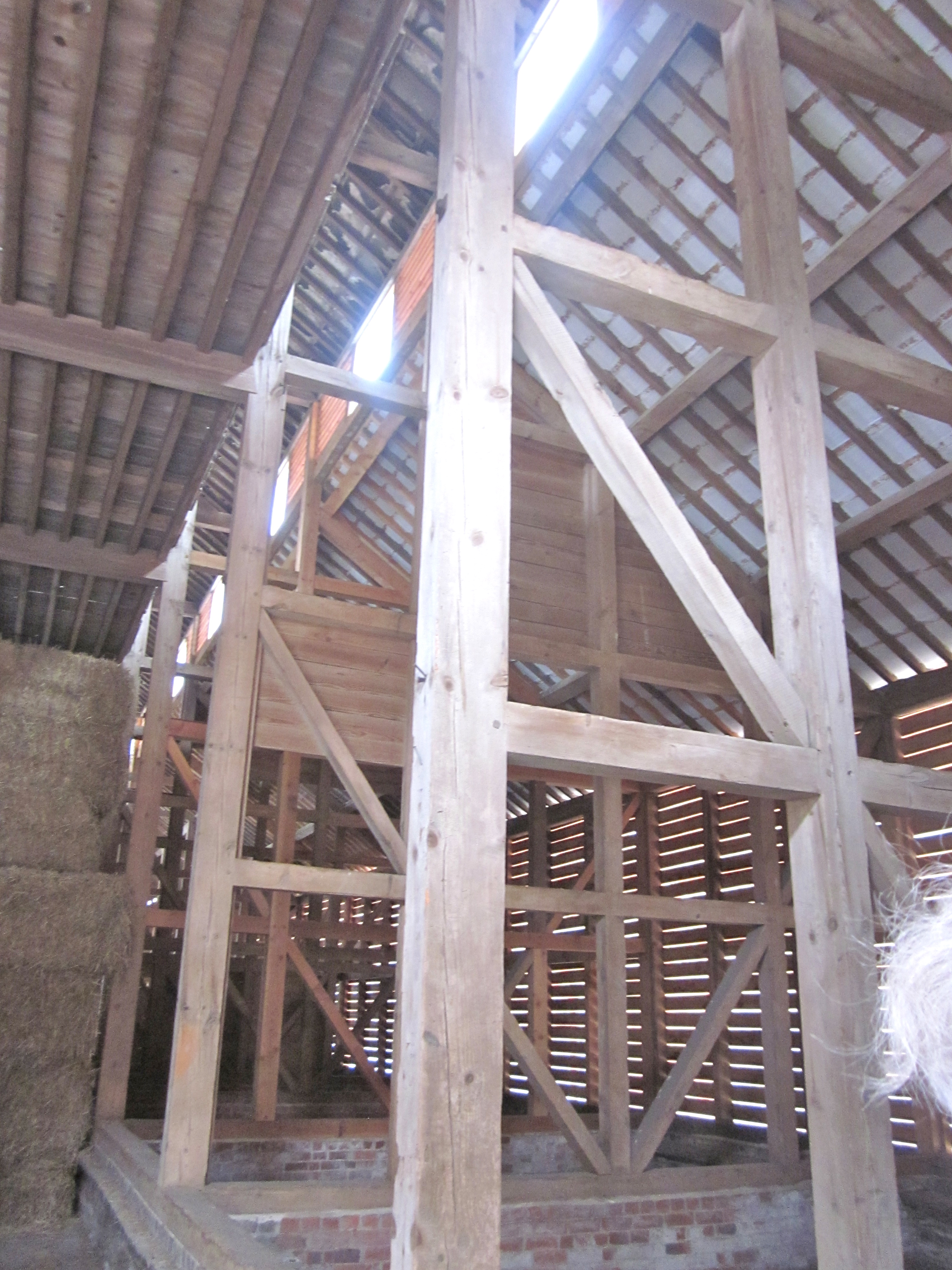
Partitioned storage in Hay Barn

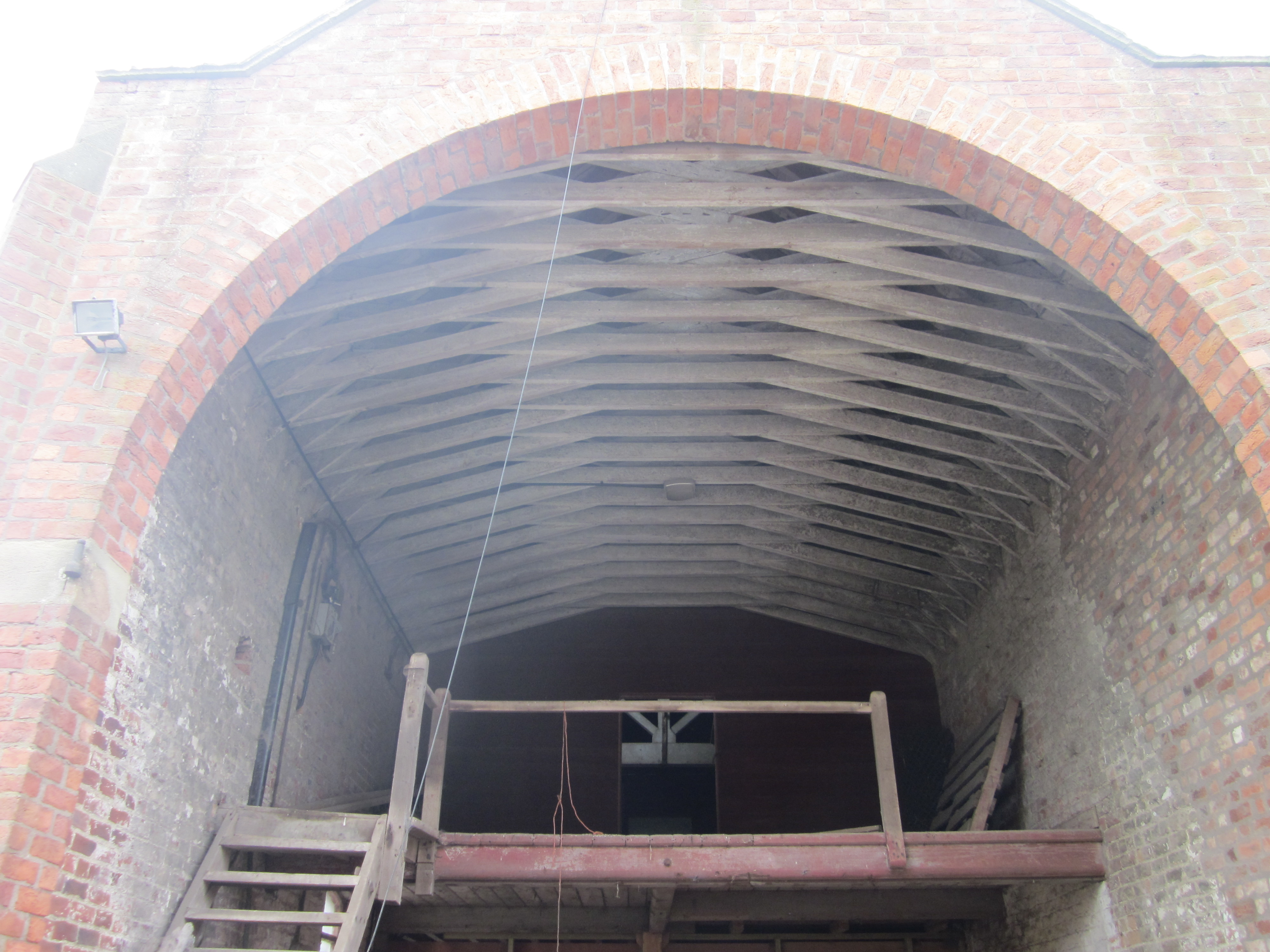
Leighton Model Industrial Farm Barn Roof bracing

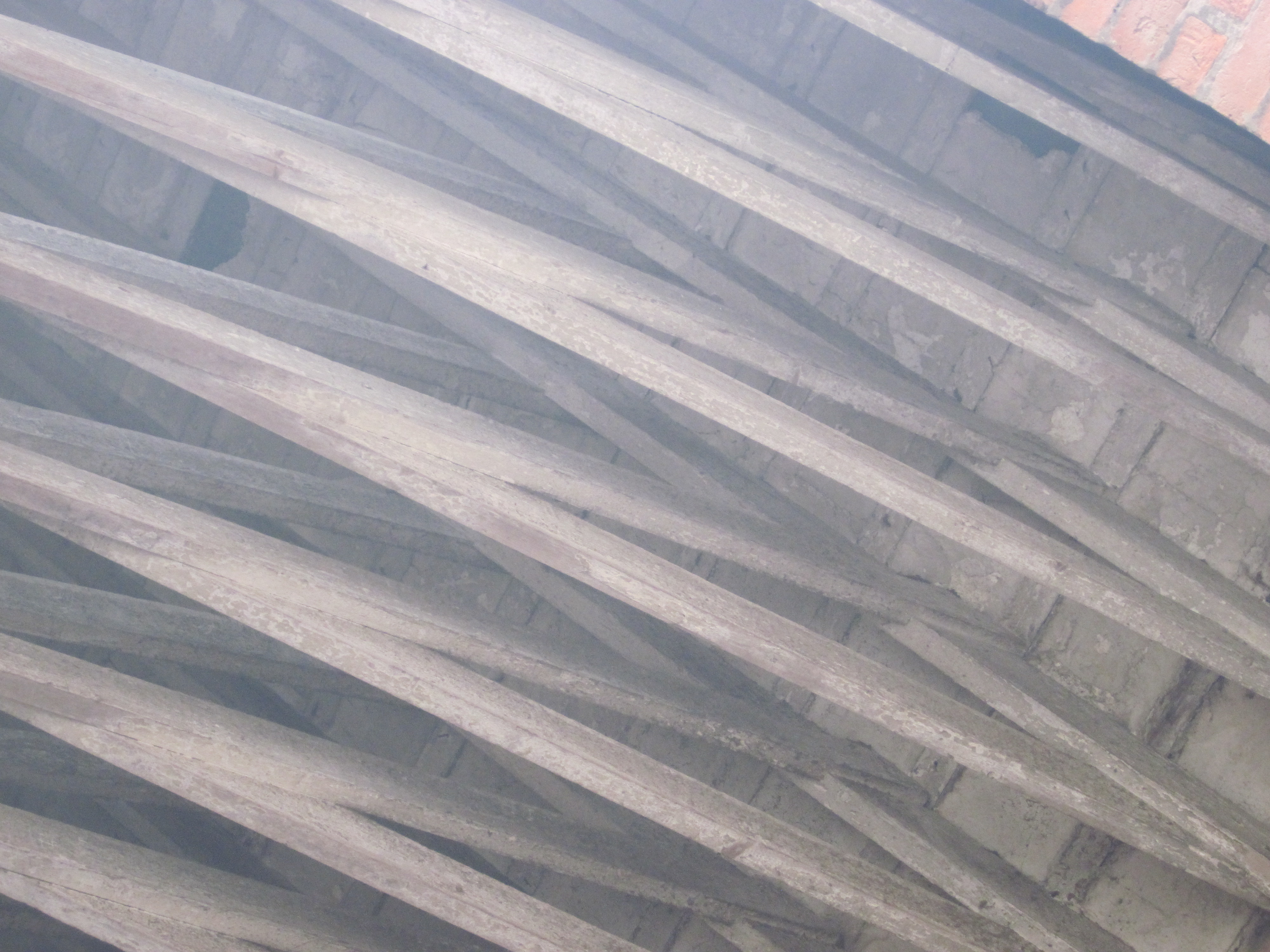
Barn roof bracing with original torching

=== Farm Manager's House Poolton and Gortheur ===
Poolton and Gortheur stand at the SW corner of the complex of buildings comprising Leighton Farm and are attached on N and E sides to a former office and stock houses. Poolton was possibly designed for the farm manager, with Gortheur as an original service wing.

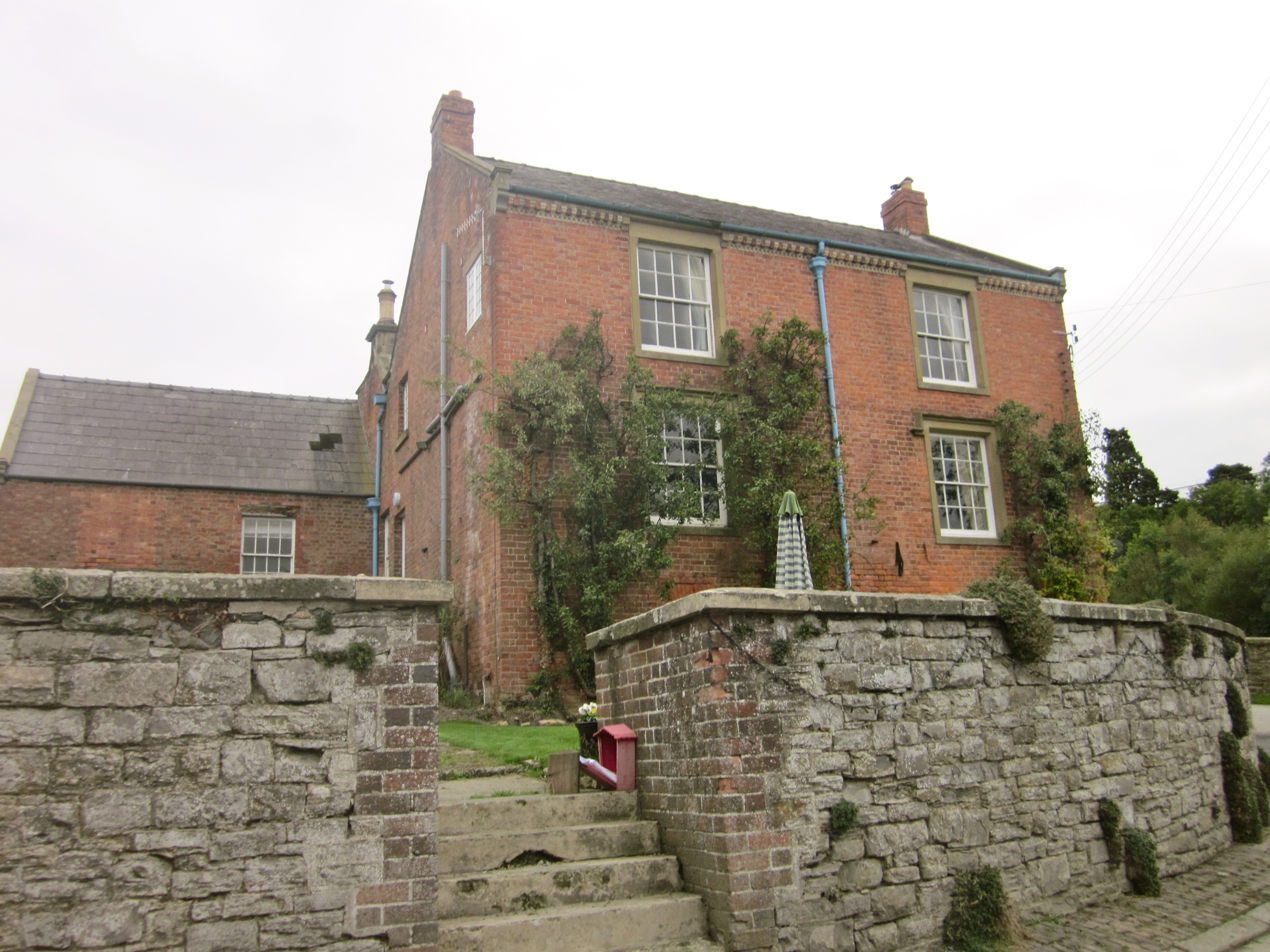
‘Poolton’’, Manager’s House West side

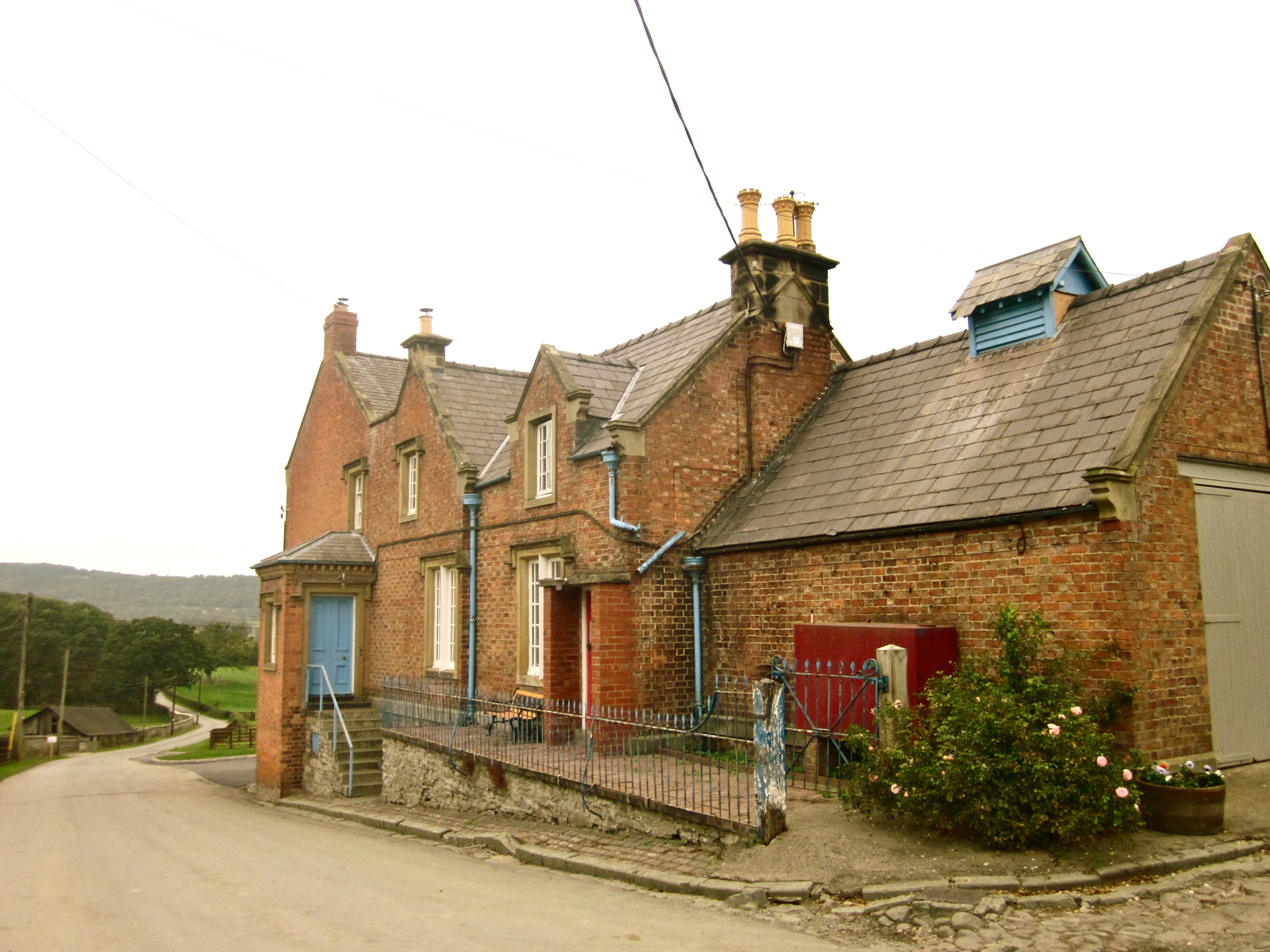
’‘Poolton’’, Manager’s House S side

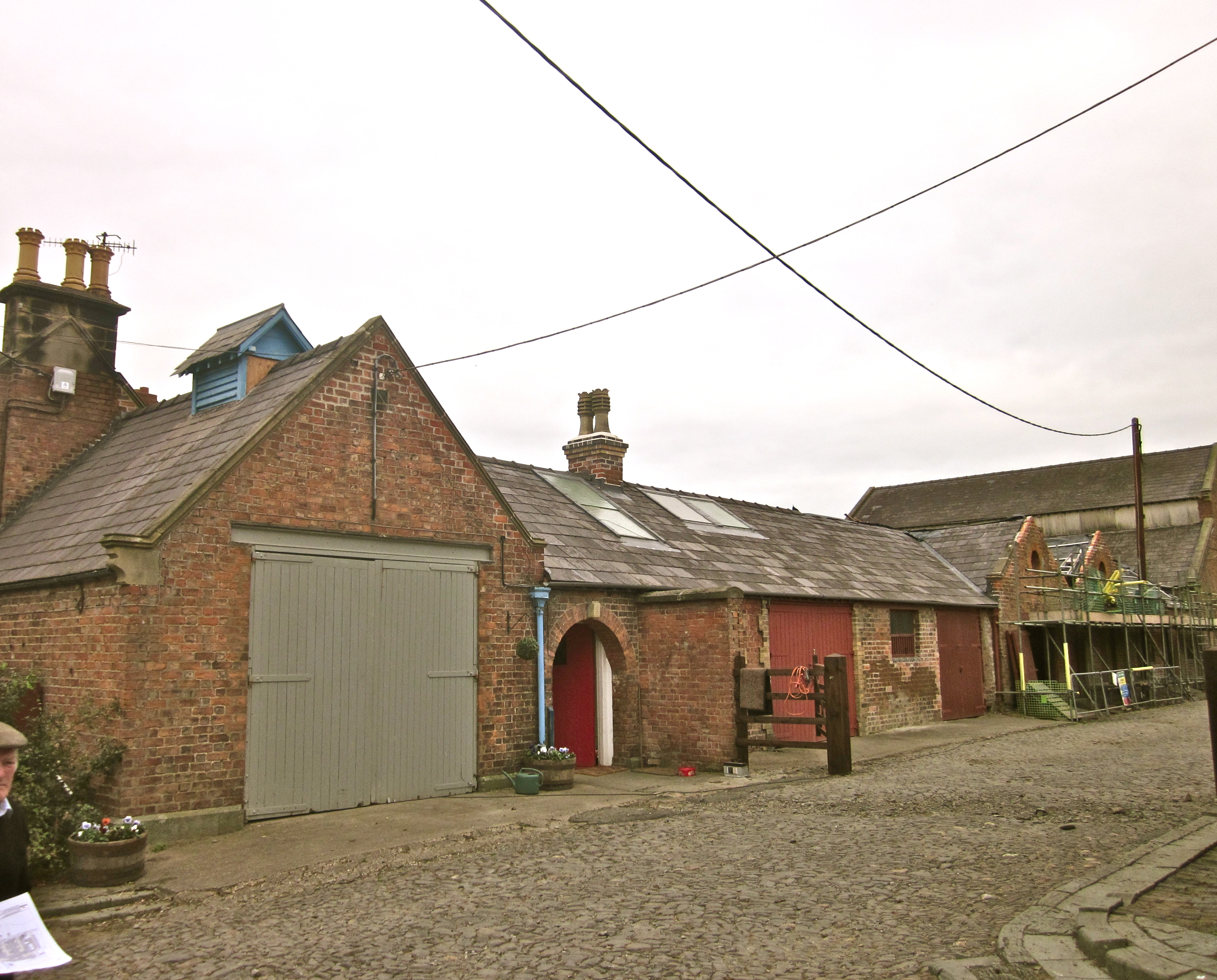
Main entrance next to ‘‘Poolton’’

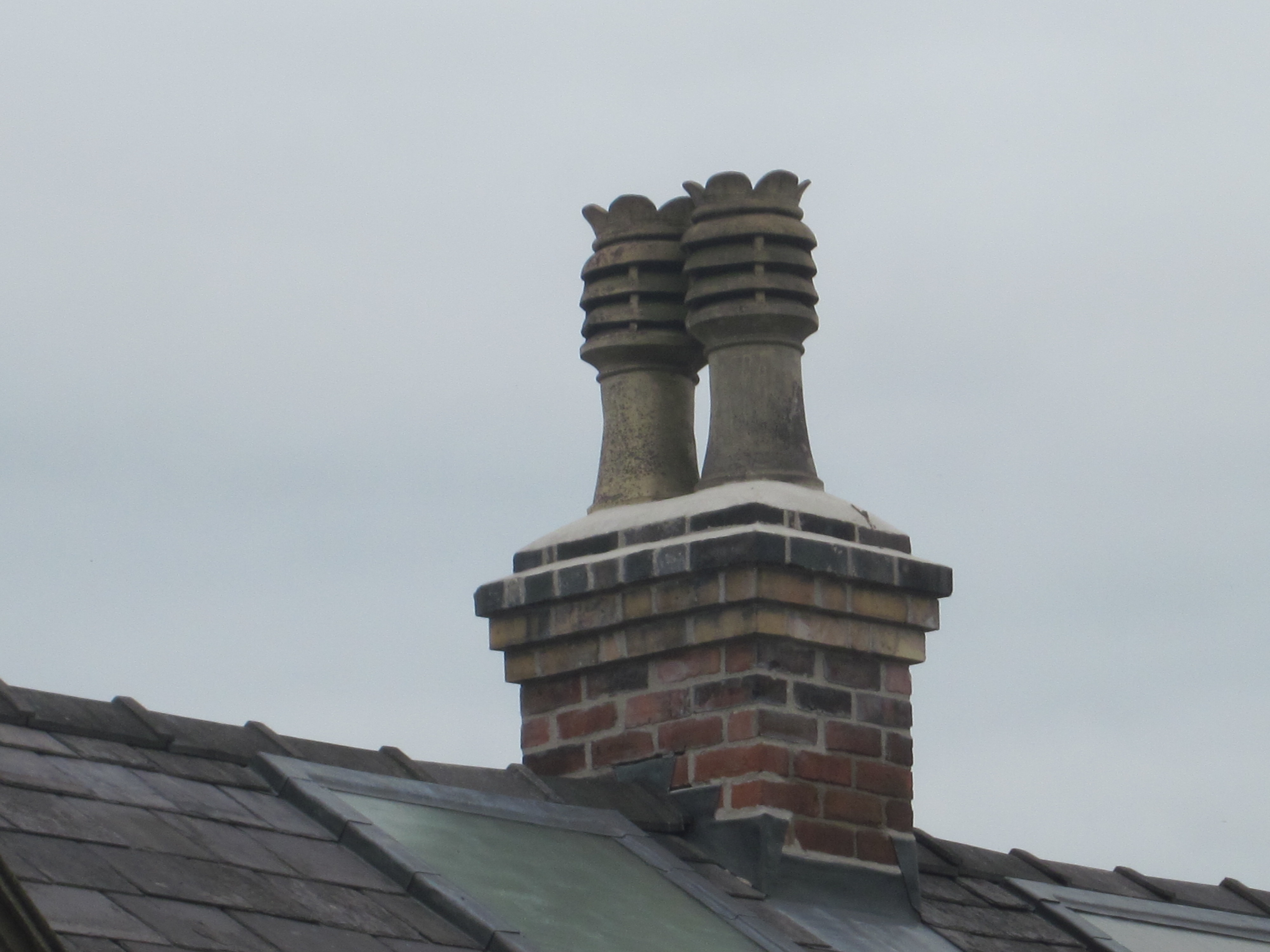
Chimney pots

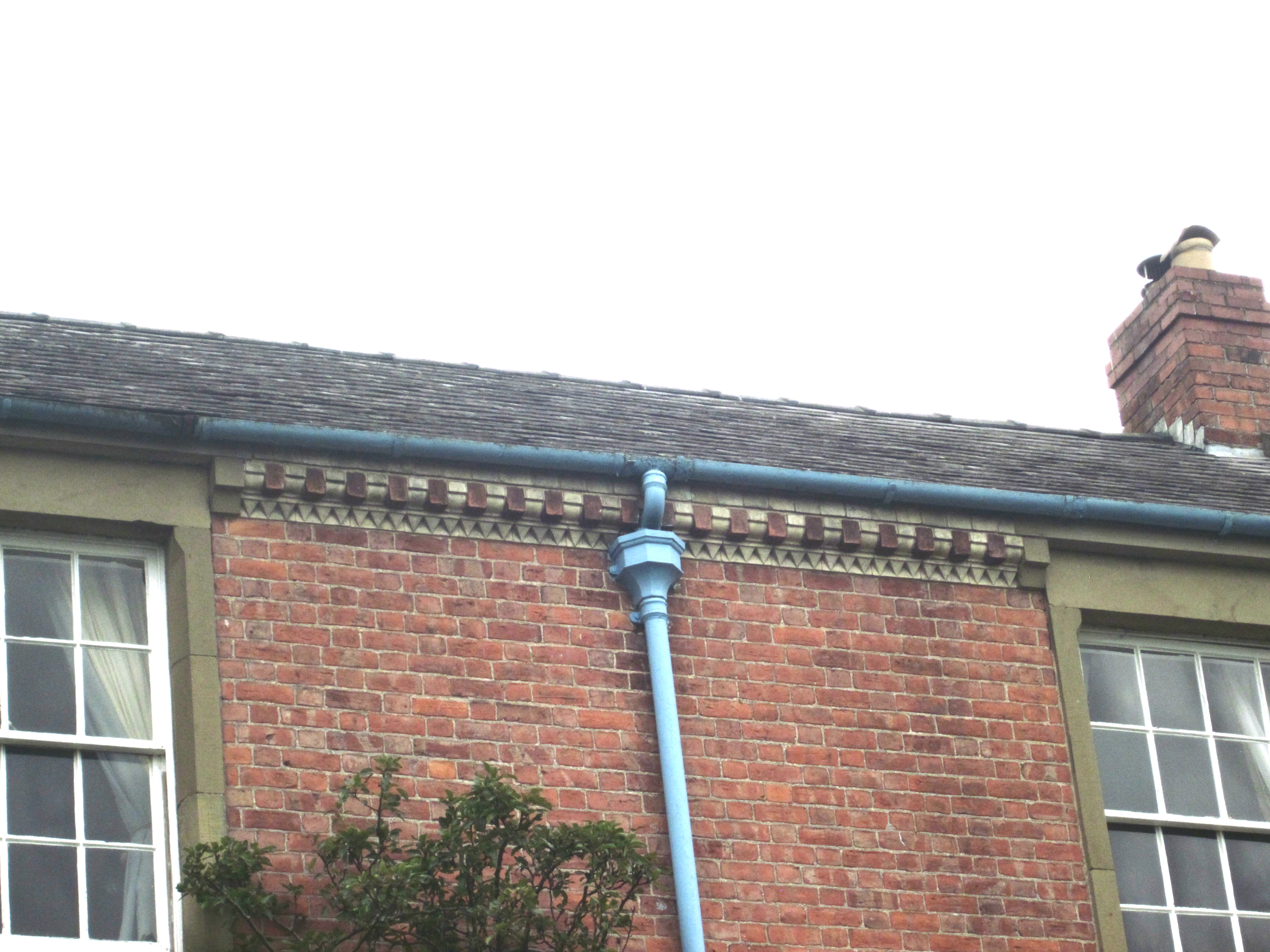
Moulded terracotta detailing on eaves at ‘‘Poolton’’

=== Leigh and Glanllyn ===
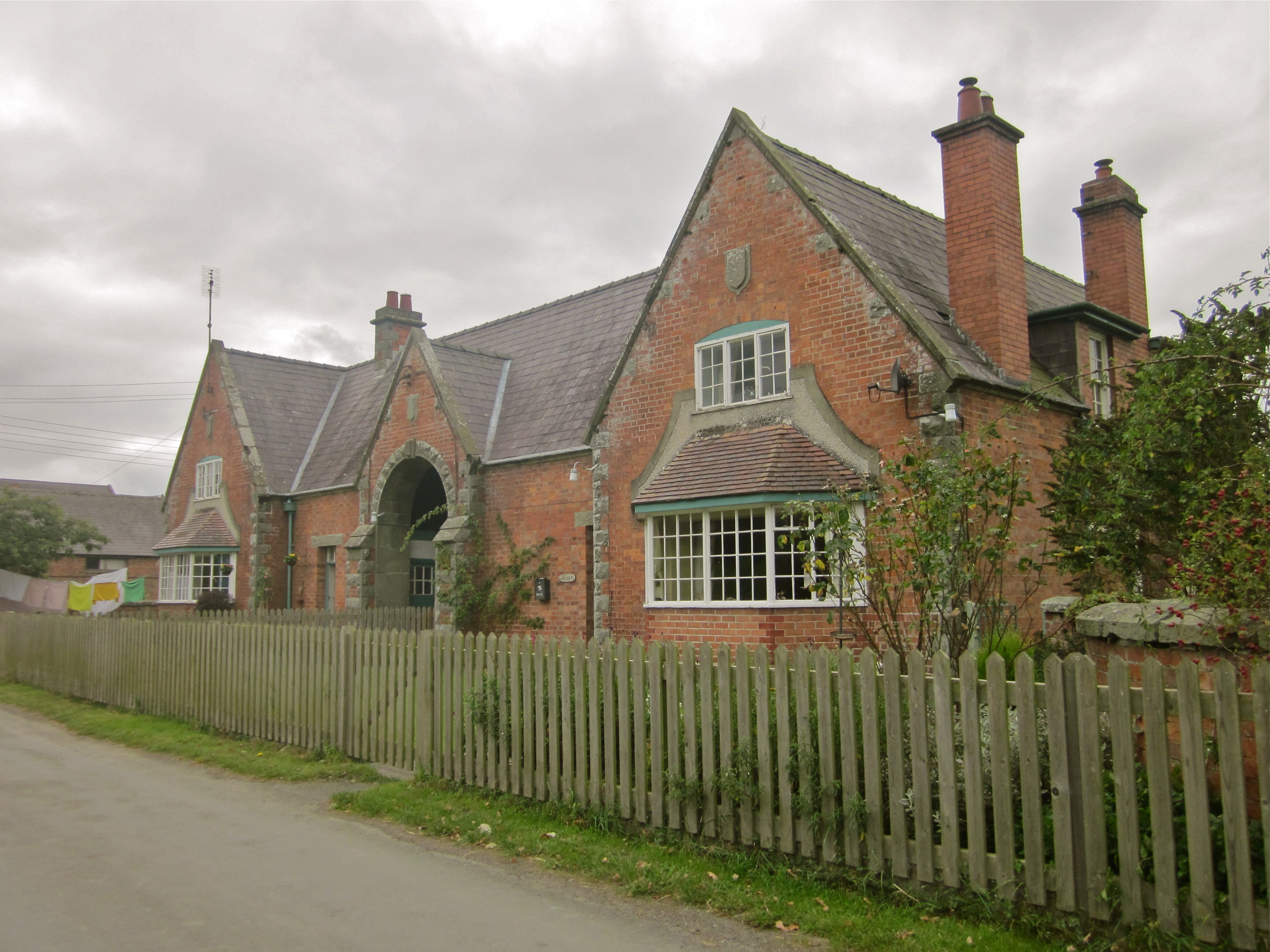
Leigh and Glanllyn-Traction Engine House converted into Houses

Built c1860s and later than the remainder of Leighton Farm, from which it stands apart. Originally the ground floor was as a 3-bay shed for parking traction and ploughing engines which could also be used to power ancillary machinery at the Leighton Home Farm, while the basement incorporated a smithy, a maintenance shop and a storage area. The building has stone rustication, typical of the style used on later buildings by the architects, Poundley and Walker. Converted to 2 dwellings by Herbert Carr, Montgomeryshire County Architect, in 1931 when Montgomeryshire County Council purchased Leighton Farm.

== Estate Buildings ==
See also Nantcribba for other estate buildings.

The Model Farm is part of a much larger group of industrialised Estate building associated with Leighton Hall these include a smaller model farm at Glanhafren on the Welshpool side of the River Severn, the Cilcewydd Corn mill, a Gas Works with Retort House, Brickyard and Brickworks, a Poultry House, funicular railway, and a massive manure slurry tank on the Moel y Mab hill, which was used to distribute slurry through a system of copper pipes for fertilising the fields. In all there are 75 listed buildings or structures within the area of the Leighton Estate.

=== The Park Gate and Lodges ===
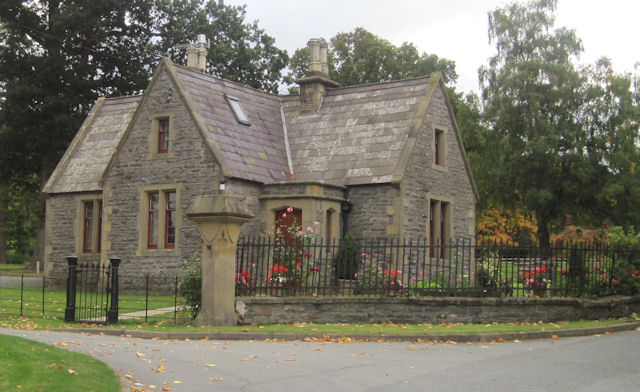
Leighton Hall Lodge

It is likely that W H Gee was the architect for the Park gate and lodges. The Hall is approached from the north-west through a three arched Gothic stone gateway set back from the road. The North or Front lodge stands on the right of the drive inside the gate arch. To its south is a second lodge, Back Lodge, which is a small two-storey house in similar but plainer style to Front Lodge. A third entrance lies south of the house, with a lodge, Pine Lodge, to its west. The drive from here runs northwards to the former stables. On the east side of the estate, an entrance side gate connects to Church Lodge. This is a single-storey stone buildings with an attic storey and slate roof. It is executed in the Tudorbethan/Gothic style. A small porch stands on the west side of the house and the roof is ornamented with central, twin stone stacks, an ornamental iron ridge and finials on the gables and probably dates from about 1851–52.

=== Poultry or Fowl House and the Poultry Cottage. ===
The Poultry House and the Poultry Cottage are to the east of Leighton Hall and are typical examples of Poundley and Walker's Cottage Ornee and Tudoresque styles. The Poultry House was built in 1861 by John Naylor for his daughter Georgina, to house an extensive collection of many species of ornamental fowl. It is timber framed, and has yellow brick nogging and a most elaborate ornamental bargeboard on the central gable. The adjacent house was the Poultry Keeper's cottage. Over the windows are Tudor style dripmolds with replacement bargeboards to the dormers. The ornamental terracotta chimney stacks were probably supplied by John Marriott Blashfield of Stamford. Both the Poultry House, which retains all its original fittings, and the Poultry Cottage, now used for holiday accommodation, were restored by the Landmark Trust in 1998–9.

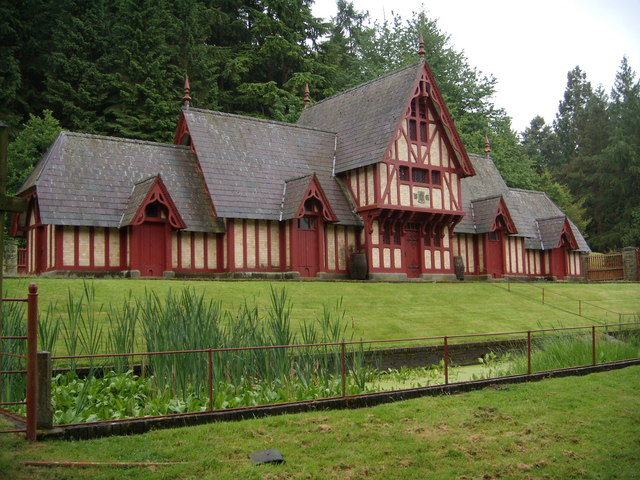
Poultry or Fowl House at Leighton Hall

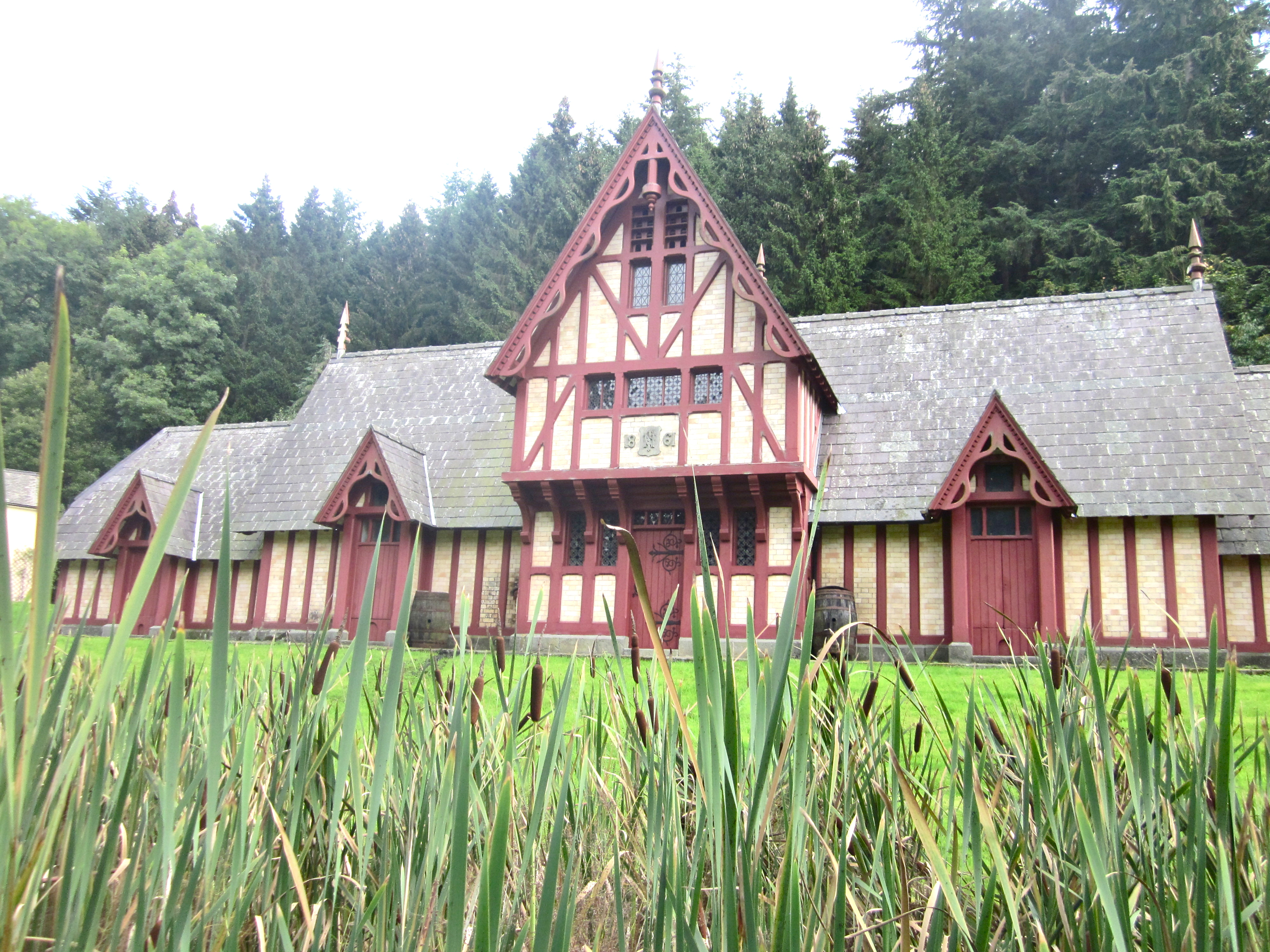
Poultry or Fowl House at Leighton Hall

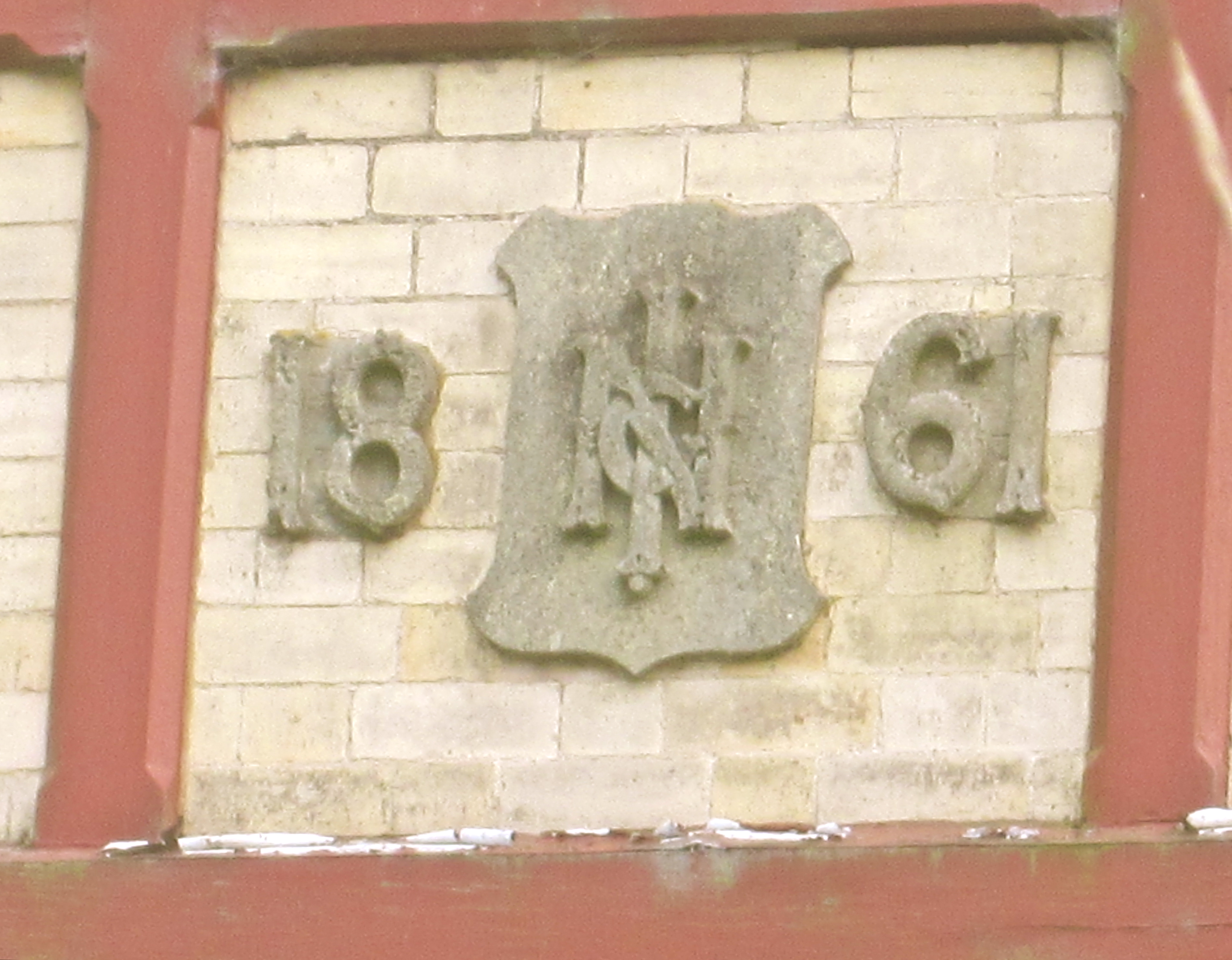
Poultry or Fowl House at Leighton Hall. Date stone on central gable

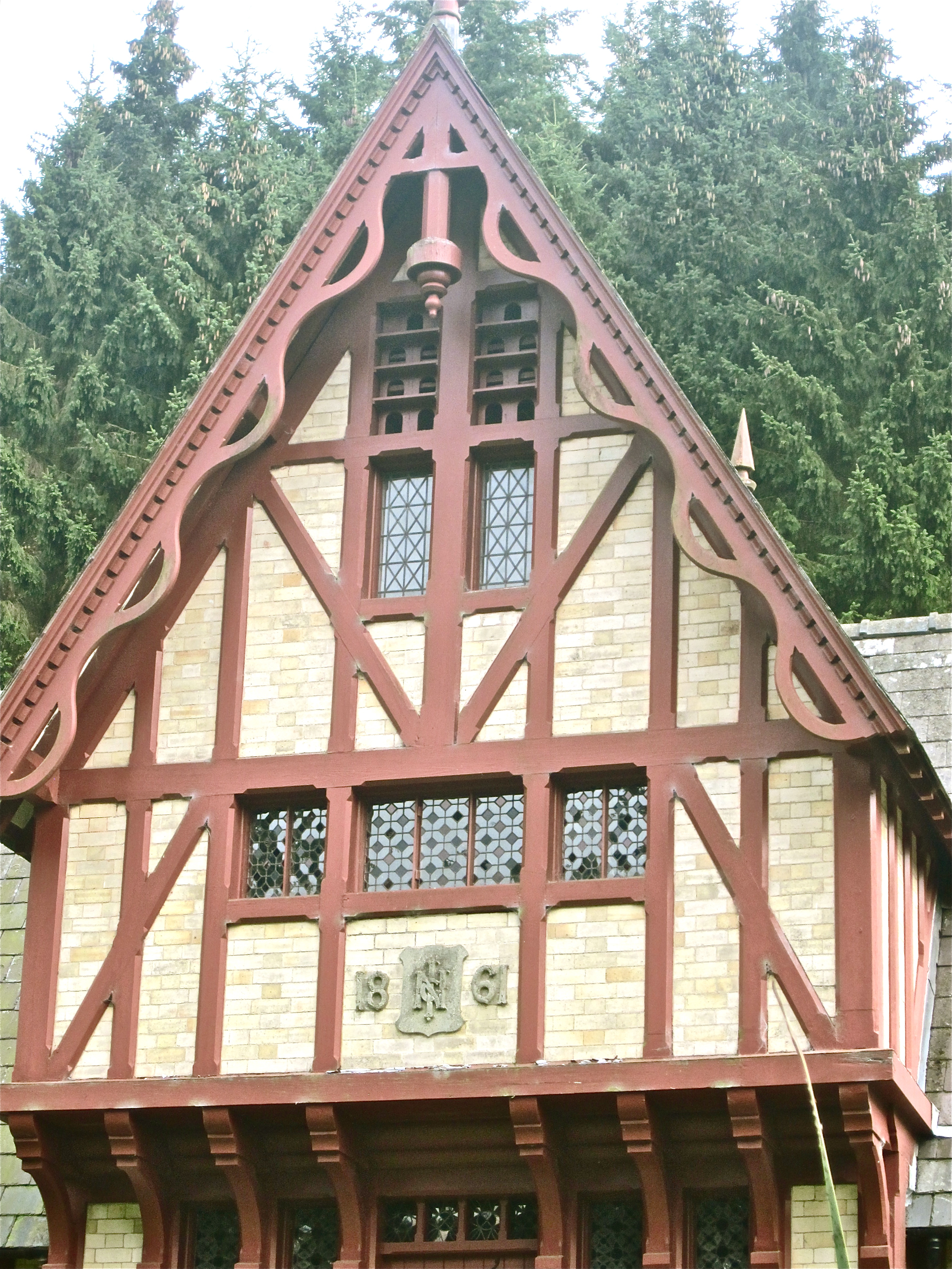
Poultry or Fowl House at Leighton Hall. Central gable

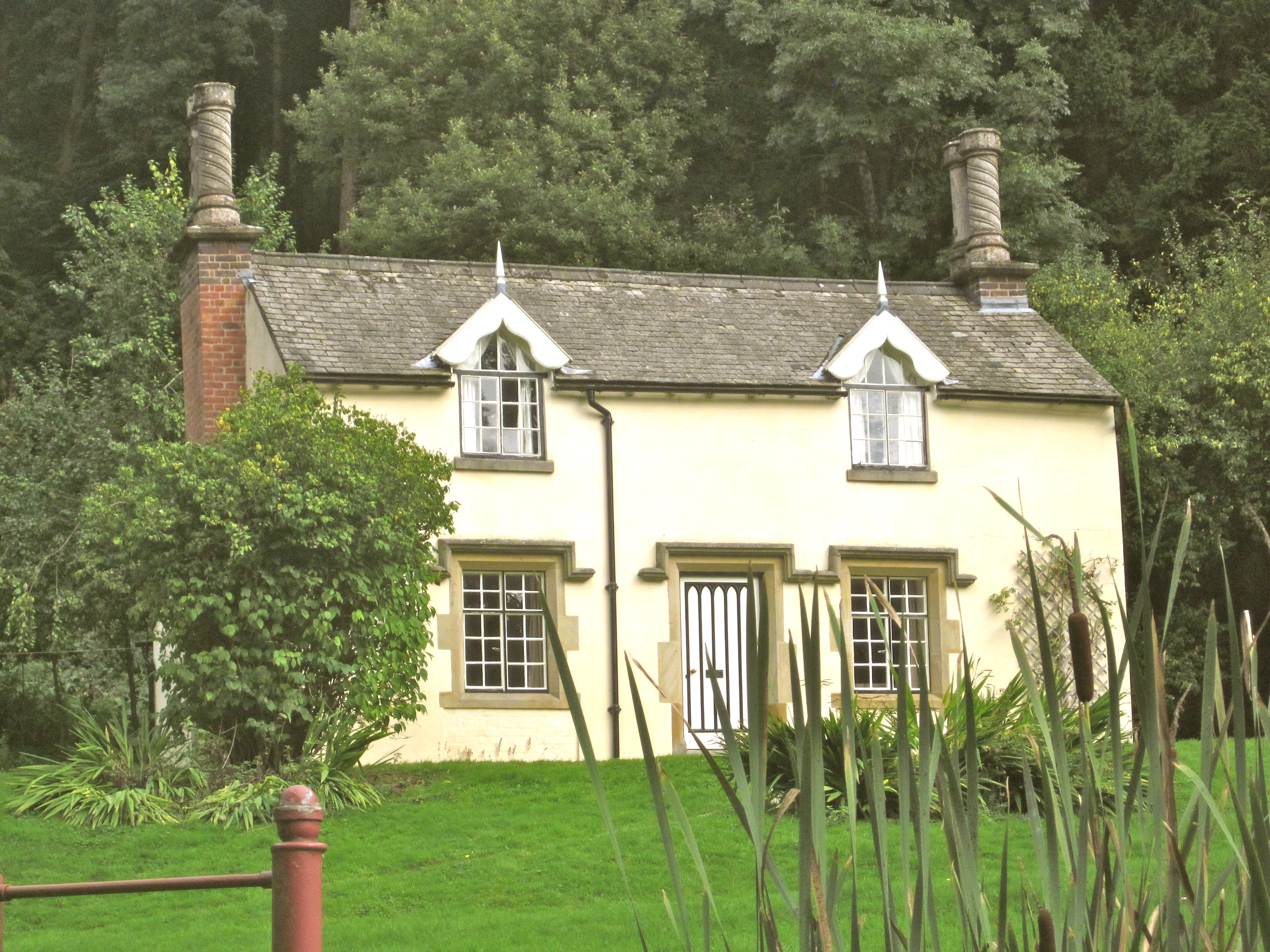
Poultry Cottage for the Poultry Keeper

=== Moel y Mab Slurry Tank and the Cable Houses ===
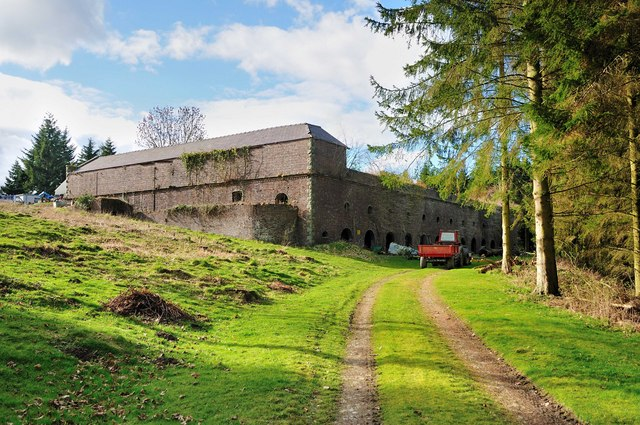
Stone built Slurry tank at Moel y Mab. Part of the Leighton Model Farm.

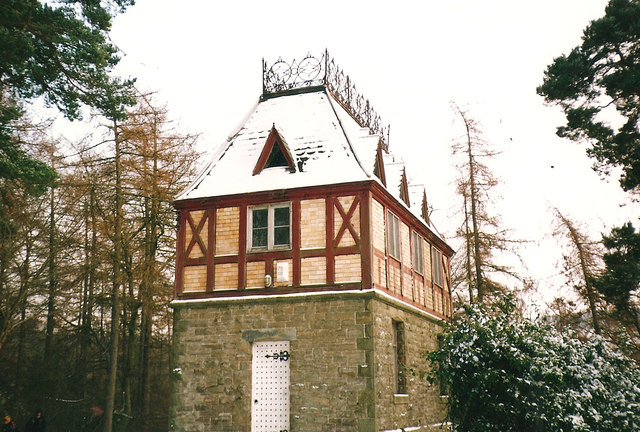
Leighton Hall Top Engine House or Summerhouse

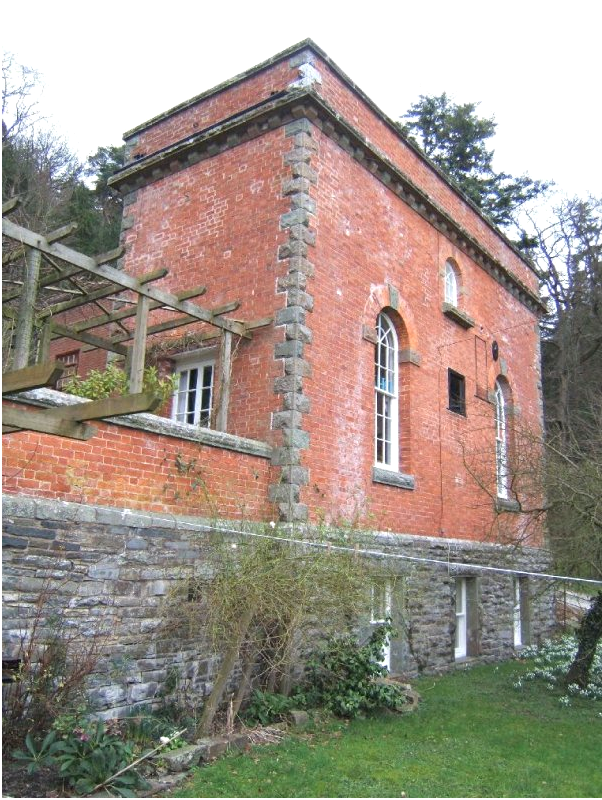
Leighton Hall, Cable House

In the valley of the Severn the river was diverted to drive a water-ram which pumped water to a huge stone faced tank on Moel-y-Mab, a spur of the Long Mountain. Feedstuffs were brought up to the adjacent Cowsheds by a funicular railway, where liquid manure was stored in the tank. The slurry was then distributed round the farm's fields in copper pipes. An Upper and Lower Cable House were built. The lower one is of brick, the upper of Cefn stone from Minera. Its upper stage is of decorative timber-framing with a steeply-hipped roof. The last functioned as a summer-house. The Lower Cable house also housed a water turbine. The Lower Cable house is brick on stone foundations. It has stone rustication quoining, which is typical of Poundley's architectural style. The railway was built in the 1850s.

=== Estate Housing ===
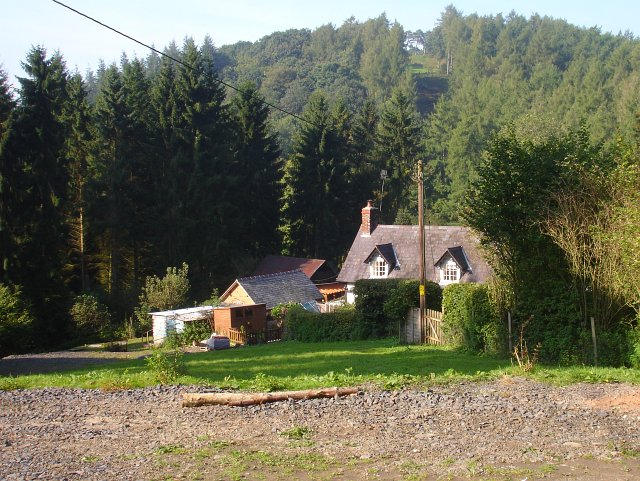
Hollybush Cottage

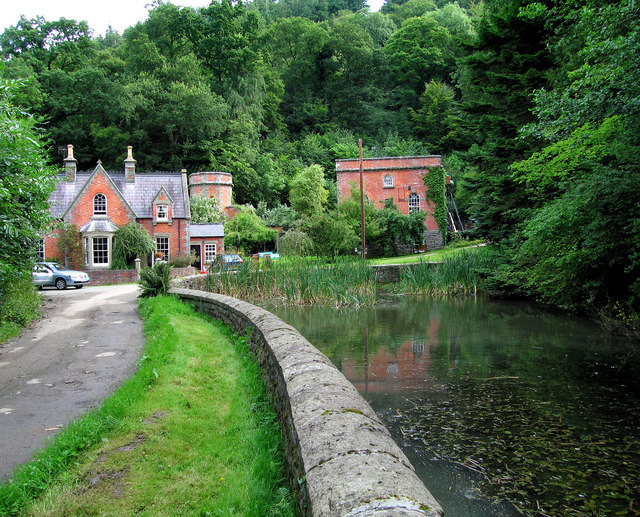
Park House and the Lower Cable House

There is a wide range of estate housing on the Leighton Hall estate, which reflects the various levels of those employed on the estate. The estate manager's house was probable the ‘‘White House’’ on the main road near Severnleigh, while some of the more important houses were in a Tudor style and constructed in stone with elaborate terracotta chimney pots. The labourers on the farm had simple double cottages, such as the brick cottages near Moel y Mab. Often much older timber framed buildings were refaced in brick and given a Cottage Ornée appearance, often by adding decorative bargeboards to the dormer windows. Hollybush Cottage is an example of this. Poundley also used this Cottage Ornée style on houses on the Naylor's Brynllywarch estate, as at Cilthriew. Poundley designed many houses using red brick, which would have come from the estate brickyard and typically, as at Park House, he used rusticated stone quoining. His partner, David Walker in contrast, favoured whitish or yellowish brick with ornamental gables, as on a double villa type house near the Mill at Cilcewydd, which can be attributed to him.

=== Cilcewydd Corn Mill ===
The main flour mill for the Naylor Estates. On the East bank of the river Severn and below a causeway which crosses the railway line and then bridges the river. The mill was built in two phases, the main block in 1862 (date on hopper head), the 2nd in 1868, in an identical style. The mill is built of brick with stone rustication on the corners. Rustication of this type was widely used on later buildings by Poundley and Walker on the Leighton estate and is also used as a decorative feature on the Naylor's estate buildings at Brynllywarch in Powys. The mill had closed by the time of the sale of the Leighton Estate in 1931 and later became a Youth Hostel and then a creamery. It now functions as a vehicle bodywork repair shop, and for vehicle maintenance. The wide head race which drove the Macadam water turbines, manufactured in Belfast, at the N end, is now largely dry.

=== Glanhafren Estate. ===
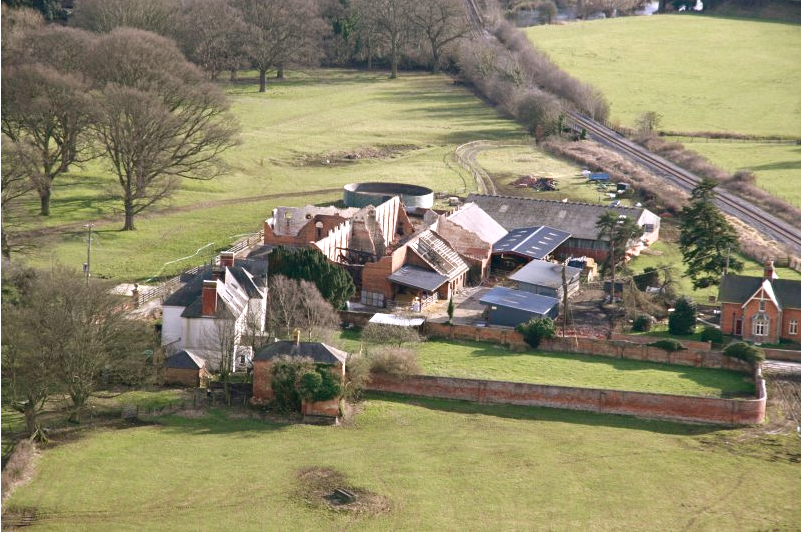
Glanhafren. The 18th century house and the Great barn following the fire in 2005/6

Originally owned by the Griffiths family, but had been sold to the Pryce-Jones family by 1745, when it formed part of a small estate. It was purchased by John Naylor in 1854. The house is between the railway line and the river Severn to the S of Welshpool, approached via a track which leaves the A490 Montgomery Road immediately W of Cilcewydd. The house dates from the early 18th century and is Grade II* on account of important interior panelled rooms. There is an illustration of the house in 1794, by John Ingleby, commissioned by Thomas Pennant, which is now in the National Library of Wales. The house was extensively rebuilt and a complex of farm buildings were added for John Naylor by the estate architects Poundley and Walker. The great barn, which was typical of Poundley's work, was burnt down on 26 December 2005.

== See also ==
- Powis Castle – a grade 1 National Trust property located on the opposite side of the valley
- Haggerston Castle. The Northumberland Home of the Naylor/Leyland Family.
- Garthmyl Hall, a Grade II listed house in Berriew. Garthmyl Hall was completely rebuilt in 1859 by the architect James K Colling for Major-General William George Gold, at the expense of John Naylor of Leighton Hall.
- Kelmarsh Hall, Northamptonshire. Estate purchased by Richard Christopher Naylor in 1864, but sold in 1902
- Nantclwyd Hall. Home of Sir Philip Vyvyan Naylor-Leyland, 4th Baronet .

== Literature ==
- Anton-Stephens, D, (1988), Holy Trinity Church, Leighton.
- Cadw (1999) Register of Landscapes, Parks and Gardens of Special Historic Interest in Wales: Powys. Cardiff ISBN 1 85760 196 3
- Coode, LM, Doring, C, Jackson, J & Swann, S, (1986), Leighton Park Estate: Report of student survey 1986, Ironbridge Institute research paper 1.
- Coode, LM, Doring, C, Jackson, J & Swann, S, (1988), Leighton Park Estate: Report of student survey 1988, Ironbridge Institute research paper 20.
- Evans D.W., Lewis S.A., and Fenwick P.P. (1989), Leighton Park Estate: Report of student survey 1988, Ironbridge Institute research paper No 49. (Covers Offa's Pool, Glan Hafren, The Haybarn, The Tank House and the Sawmill.)
- Haslam, R, (1991),Leighton Hall Estate, Powys, Country Life pp. 116–9.
- Scourfield R and Haslam R,(2013) Buildings of Wales: Powys; Montgomeryshire, Radnorshire and Breconshire, 2nd edition, Yale University Press, p. 133–134.
- Tipping, Avray, (1902), Leighton Hall, Welshpool, Country Life, 25 October, pp 528–35.
- Robinson J M. (1983), Georgian Model Farms: A Study of Decorative and Model Farm Buildings in the Age of Improvement 1700–1846. Oxford.
- Wade-Martins S (1991), Historic Farm Buildings Batsford, London.
- Wade-Martins S (2002), The English Model Farm – Building the Agricultural Ideal, 1700–1914 English Heritage/Windgather Press.
- Wade-Martins S (2010), The model farms of the Victorian Countryside "The Victorian: The magazine of the Victorian Society". Issue 34, 4–8 July 2010
- Wiliam E, (1986), Historical Farm Buildings of Wales, John Donald, Edinburgh
