= Blashfield =

Blashfield is a surname. Notable people with the surname include:

- Edwin Blashfield (1848–1936), American pianist and muralist
- Jean Blashfield Black, American game designer
- John Marriott Blashfield (1811–1882), British property developer
- Jim Blashfield (born 1944), American filmmaker
