= Codman Building =

- U.S. National Register of Historic Places
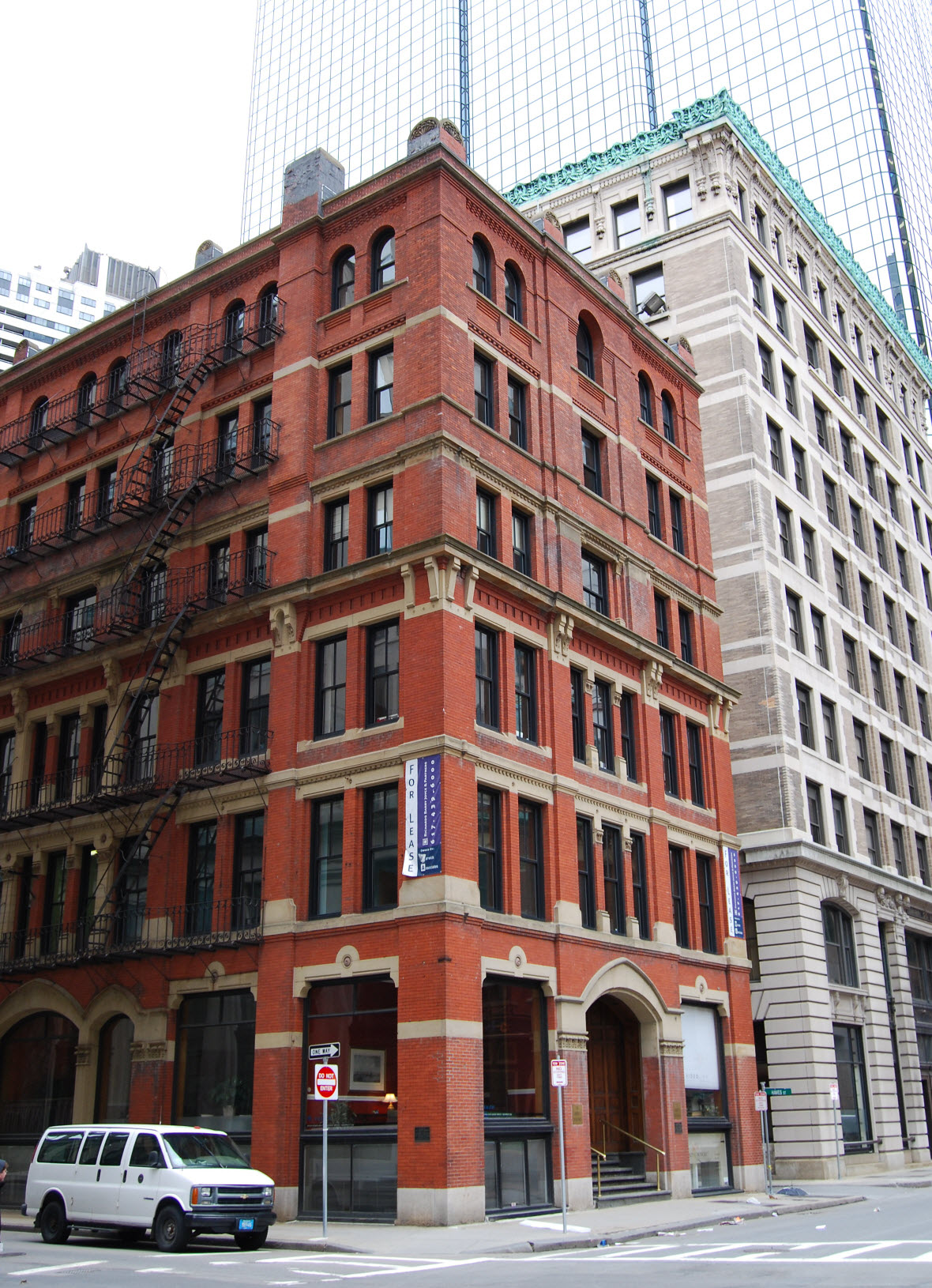
- 10 Liberty Square

- Location within Boston Location within Massachusetts Location within the United States
- Location: Boston, Massachusetts
- Coordinates: 42°21′28″N 71°3′23″W
- Built: 1873
- Architect: Sturgis & Brigham; T. J. Whidden
- Architectural style: Renaissance, Gothic
- NRHP reference No.: 83004097
- Added to NRHP: October 19, 1983

The Codman Building is a historic building at 55 Kilby Street (also known as 10 Liberty Square) in Boston, Massachusetts. The first four stories of this six-story brick and stone building were designed by Sturgis & Brigham and built in 1874 in the Gothic Revival style. It is the only one of the firm's commercial designs in the Financial District to survive. The upper three floors, in a more typical Late Victorian fashion, were added sometime before 1898.

The building was listed on the National Register of Historic Places in 1983.

== See also ==
- National Register of Historic Places listings in northern Boston, Massachusetts
- Custom House District, the adjacent building
