= John Hubbard Sturgis =

American architect and builder

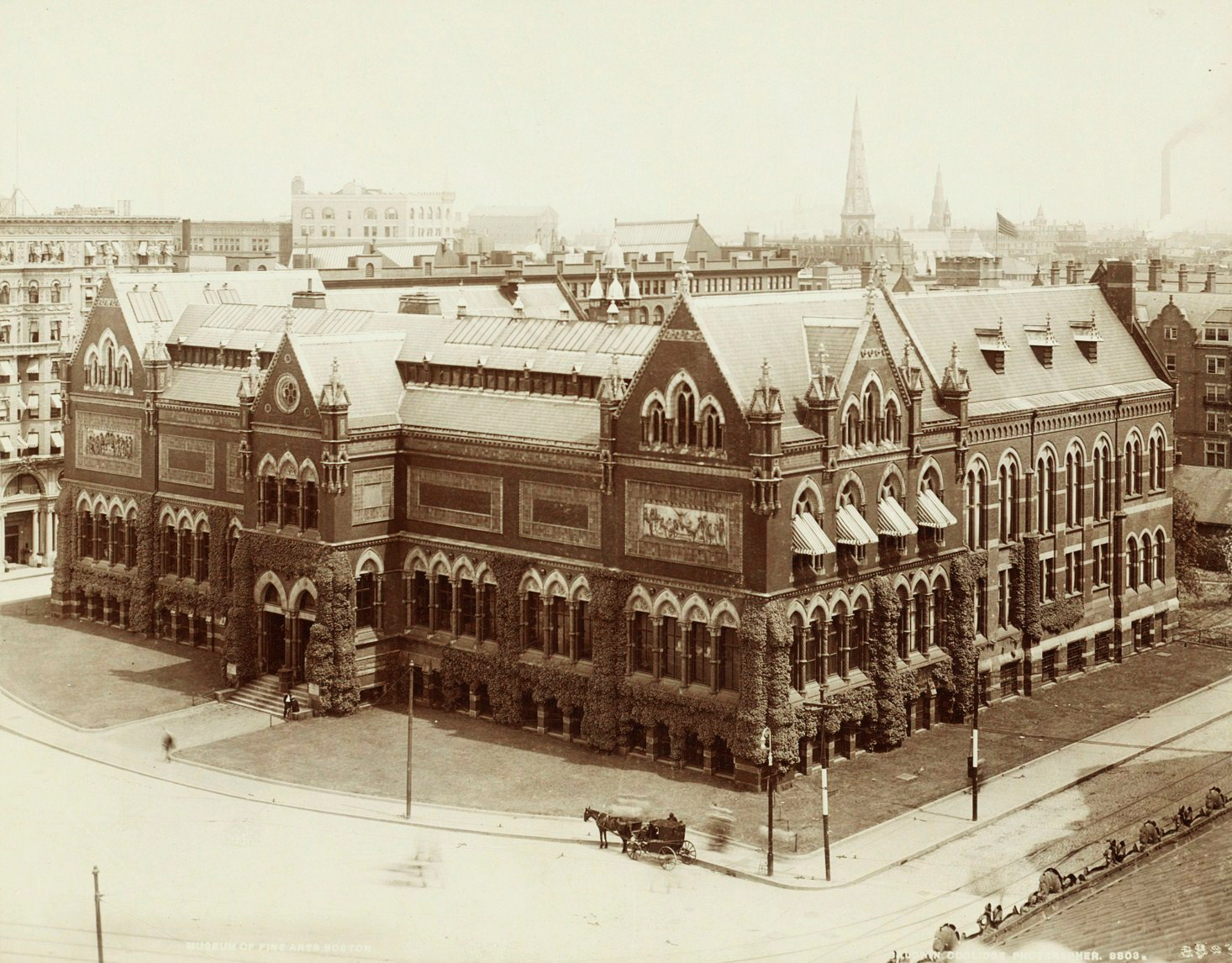
- Museum of Fine Arts, Boston by Sturgis, completed 1876, demolished 1911
- Born: August 5, 1834; Macau, China
- Died: February 14, 1888 (aged 53); St Leonards-on-Sea, East Sussex
- Education: Boston Latin School
- Occupation: Architect
- Practice: Colling & Sturgis; Bryant & Gilman; Sturgis & Brigham
- Buildings: The Albany Building; Boston Museum of Fine Arts (1876–1909)

John Hubbard Sturgis (August 5, 1834 – February 14, 1888) was an American architect and builder who was active in the New England area during the late 19th century. His most prominent works included Codman House, Lincoln, Massachusetts, and the personal residence of Isabella Stewart Gardner. Later in his architectural career he founded, along with Charles Brigham, Sturgis and Brigham. The firm lasted nearly two decades in New England and received many notable commissions such as the first Boston Museum of Fine Arts building, located in Copley Square.

== Early life ==
Sturgis was born in Macau, China on August 5, 1834. He was a son of the "very intelligent" Russell Sturgis, a wealthy Boston merchant active in the China opium trade. After attending Boston Latin School, he traveled extensively in Europe when his father became a partner in Barings Bank in London.

In England, he studied architectural drawing under James K. Colling. In 1858, Sturgis married Frances Anne Codman of Boston, later to be aunt of noted interior designer Ogden Codman Jr.

== Career ==
For the first three years after his 1858 marriage, Sturgis was in Surrey, where he tried an architectural practice, but their time there ended with the death of their first child, Julia, in January 1861.

=== Colling & Sturgis ===
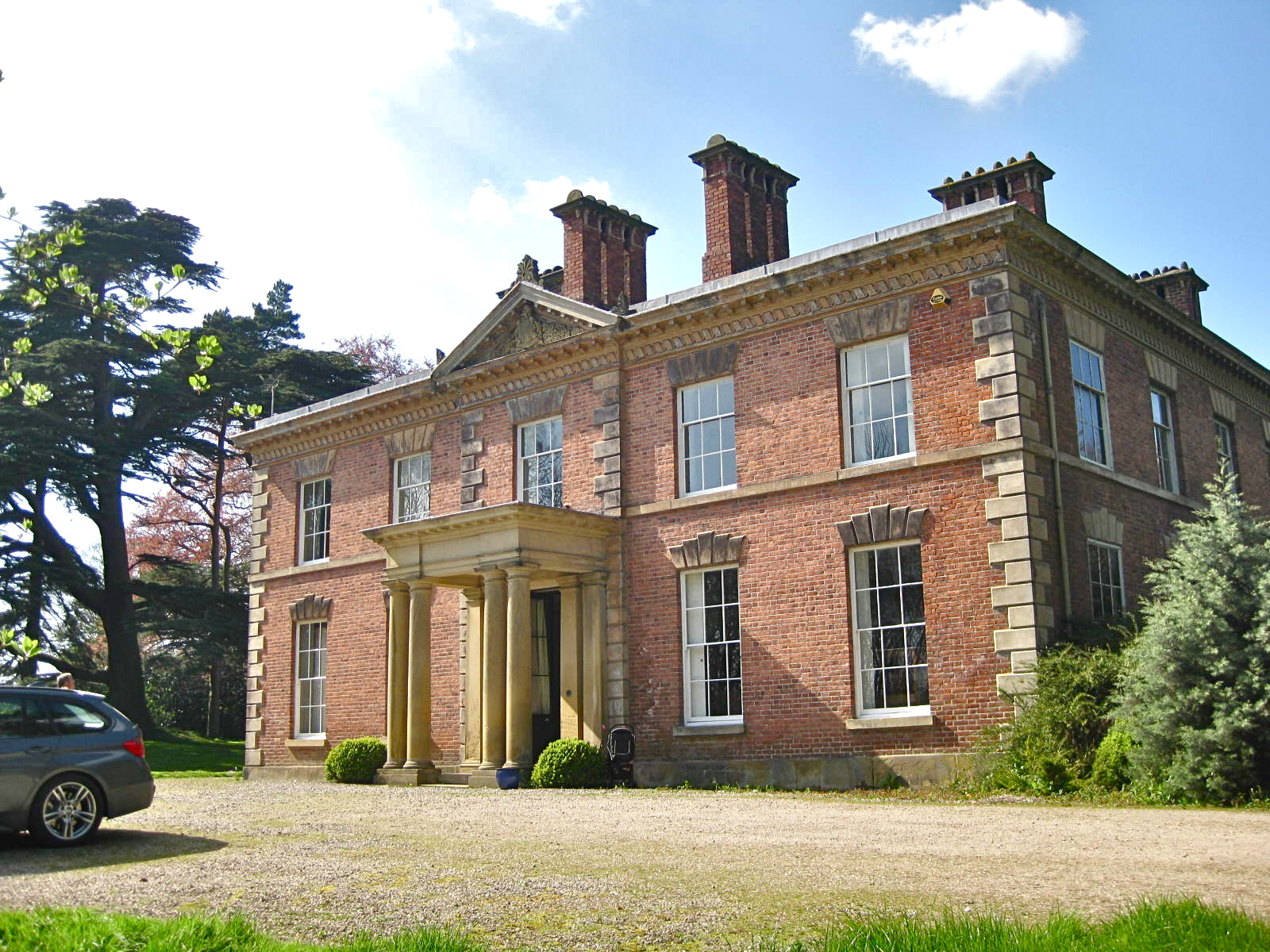
Garthmyl Hall by J K Colling, 1859

By 1856/57, he had joined with Colling to form an architectural partnership. It seems Colling provided the designs and detailing for the architectural work and that Sturgis supervised the work in progress.

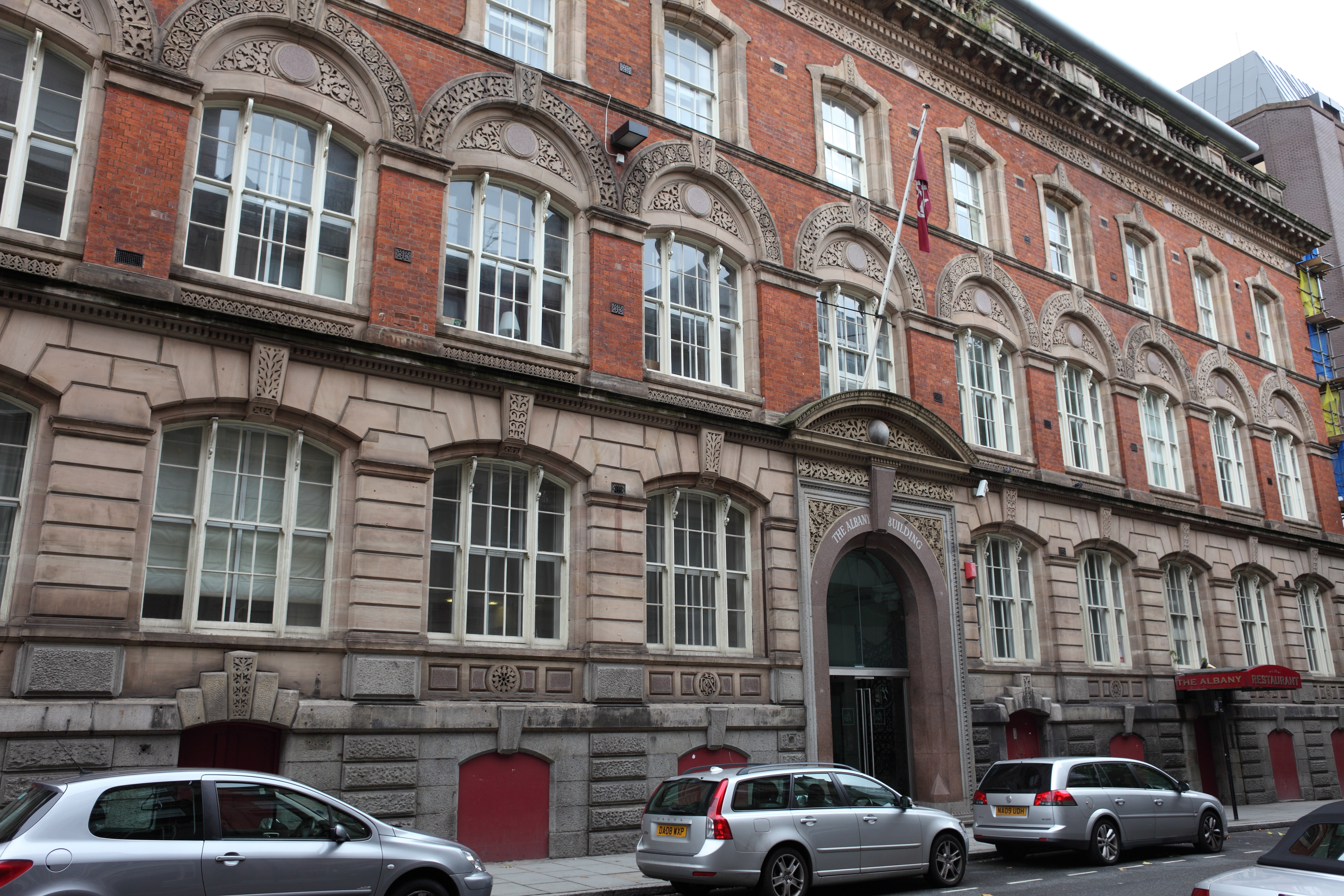
Albany, Liverpool

Their first commission was the Albany erected in 1856 for the Liverpool banker Richard Naylor. The Albany was built as a meeting place for cotton brokers. It contained offices and meeting rooms, together with warehousing facilities in the basement. It seems probable that this commission came to Colling and Sturgis as a result of Sturgis' fathers banking connection. The Albany was followed by the building of Ashwicke Hall in Marshfield, Gloucestershire, Gloucestershire for the Liverpool Attorney John Orred. This was a massive castellated Tudor Gothic House with a lofty octagonal tower at the S E.

Then in 1859, John Naylor, brother of Richard Naylor, who was also a banker and Montgomeryshire landowner requested Colling to re-build Garthmyl Hall, Berriew for his brother-in-law Major-General William George Gold. Colling was given a free hand by the wealthy John Naylor when building Garthmyl Hall, as seen by the use of lavish gilding and plasterwork for ceiling decoration, and for the ornamental stonework on the exterior. This was an opportunity for him to put into practice some of the designs illustrated in his books. It is assumed that Sturgis was also involved in this project, as there appears to be widespread use of Terracotta, which would have been supplied by Blashfield of Stamford in this project; and that stylistically this house appears to be a precursor to Sturgis' use of terracotta in America.

=== Bryant & Gilman and Boston practice ===
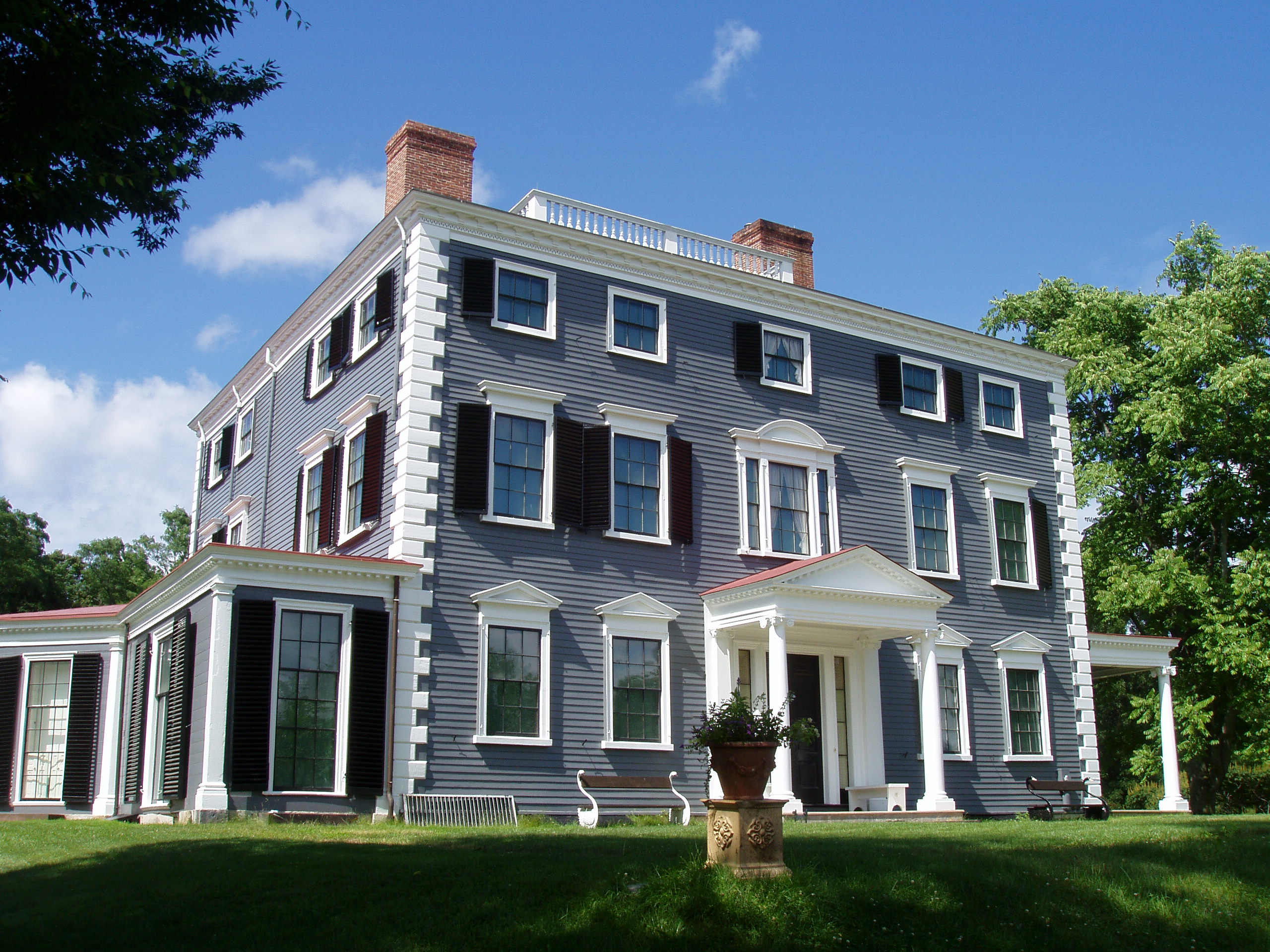
Codman House, Lincoln, Massachusetts

In autumn 1861, Sturgis and his wife returned to Boston, where Sturgis found work at Bryant & Gilman, then the largest architectural firm in Boston. During this time he worked his own practice as well, providing designs for seaside cottages for members of the family and others. These included

- Sunnywaters in (1863), Manchester-by-the-Sea, Massachusetts, for his older brother Russell.
- The Grange, or Codman House, in Lincoln, Massachusetts, which he thoroughly redesigned from in 1862-8 for his wife's brother Ogden Codman.
- Lowlands, Nahant, Massachusetts, for George Abbott James.
- Col. Charles Codman Estate in Cotuit, Massachusetts, for the Charles Russell Codman.
- Greenvale Farm (1864), Portsmouth, Rhode Island.
- Seaside house (1864), Land's End, on Ledge Road, Newport, Rhode Island, for Sam Ward, his father's business associate. This house was later acquired by Edith Wharton, a cousin through the New York Newbolds, and completely reworked by her and Ogden Codman Jr. for their book, The Decoration of Houses.
- The Rocks (1866), Newport Rhode Island.

=== Sturgis & Brigham ===
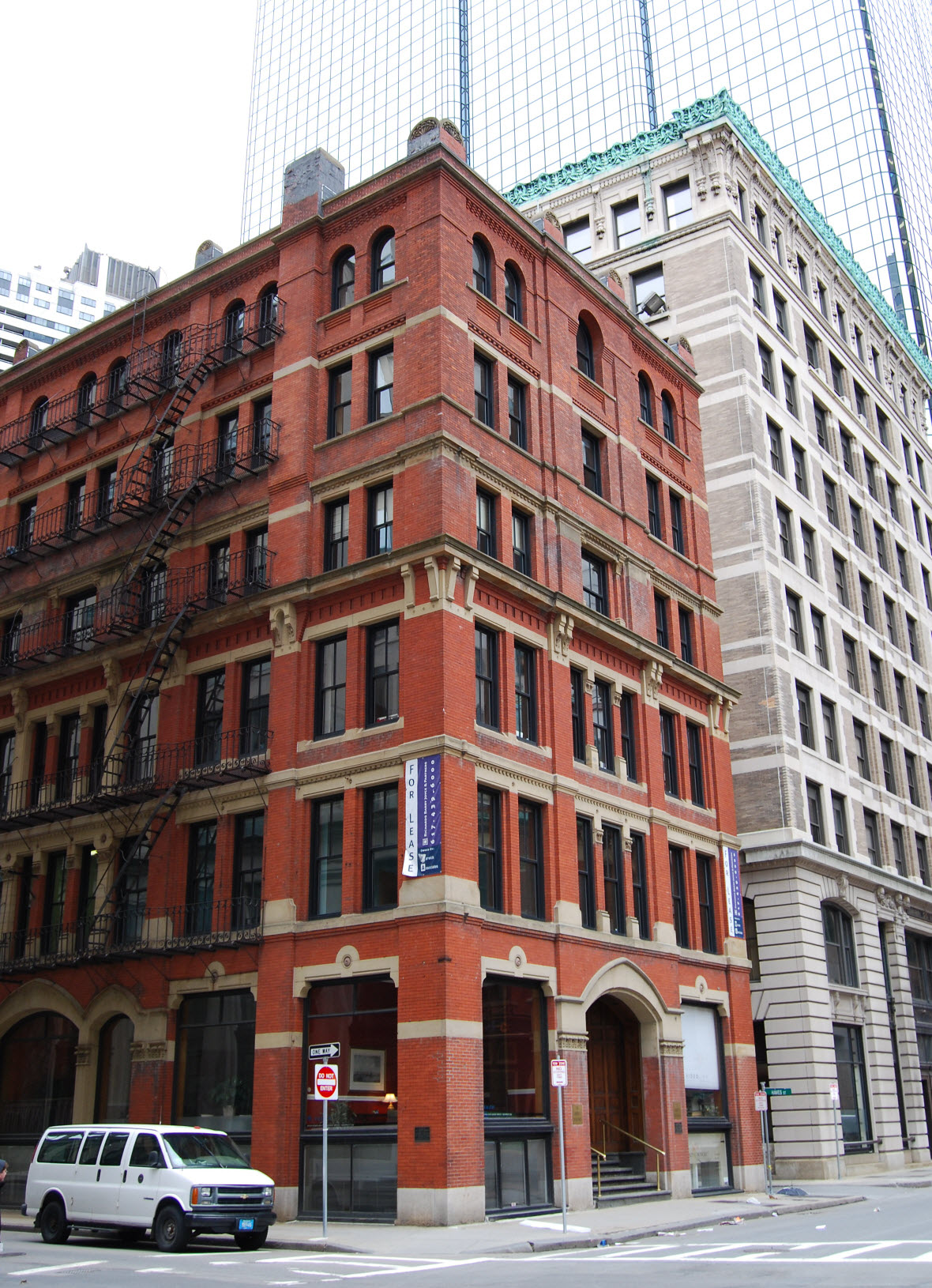
The Codman Building, 1873

In 1866, Sturgis formed a partnership with a fellow Bryant and Gilman employee, Charles Brigham, to found Sturgis and Brigham. This partnership would last twenty years, until shortly before Sturgis's death. Sturgis was also visiting England regularly and continued to work closely with Colling, who supplied him with designs. Colling is known to have supplied the designs for stonework on Pinebank Mansion (1868) a house for Edward N. Perkins' on the shore of Jamaica Pond. Sturgis also imported terracotta from J. M. Blashfield's works at Stamford, Lincolnshire for this project, which served as the prototype for the terracotta used for the Boston Museum of Fine Arts.

Following the recommendations of Henry Cole, Director of the Victoria and Albert Museum, Sturgis & Brigham were appointed architects to build the new Boston Museum of Fine Arts (1870–1876) in a Gothic style. Colling prepared all the drawings for the terracotta decoration and commissioned them from Blashfield's works. At this point terracotta production had hardly developed in the United States and the products often lacked durability. The building of the Museum was the first major use of Terracotta in an American building and led to its widespread popularity. It did not bring success to Blashfield, who had underestimated the cost of the contract and the problems of shipping to America. The Stamford Terracotta Company was forced in liquidation in 1874. For future supplies of terracotta for the Codman and YMCA buildings in Boston, which were the work of Sturgis & Brigham, they were likely to have been reliant in terracotta from the Chicago Terracotta Company, run by James Taylor, Blashfield's former foreman.

Other buildings by Sturgis include:

- Church of the Advent on Beacon Hill, executed in the Early English Gothic Style between 1875 and 1888.
- Isabella Stewart Gardner House for Isabella Stewart Gardner on Beacon Street in Boston.
- Frederick Ames House at 306 Dartmouth Street in Boston's Back Bay (now known as the Ames-Webster Mansion).
- "The Cottage" (1870) for H. H. Hunnewell on the Hunnewell estate in Wellesley, Massachusetts. This last commission is considered to be the first bona fide example of the Queen Anne style of residential architecture in the United States.

=== Later life ===
In later years, Sturgis re-designed the 1737 Boylston House in Brookline, Boston, which he rented between 1870 and 1888 from Colonel Henry Lee. Sturgis died on a visit to England in 1888.

After his death, his nephew Richard Clipston Sturgis continued the architectural practice.

== Literature ==
- Boit, Robert Apthorp (2009). Chronicles of the Boit Family and Their Descendants and of Other Allied Families. Bibliobazaar. ISBN 978-1-113-65501-1.
- Floyd, M. H. Sturgis, John Hubbard in J M Marter (ed.) The Grove Encyclopedia of American Art, Volume 1, Oxford University Press, 2011, 601–2
- Floyd, M. H. "Redesign of 'The Grange' by John Hubbard Sturgis, 1862–186", Old Time New England, vol. 74, 1981, pp 41–65
- Stratton, M. The Terracotta Revival: Building Innovation and the Industrial City in Britain and Northern America, Gollancz, London 1993, 144–47
- Sturgis, J. From the Books and Papers of Russel Sturgis, Oxford Univ. Press, 1893.
