= Jamaica Pond =

Lake in the United States of America

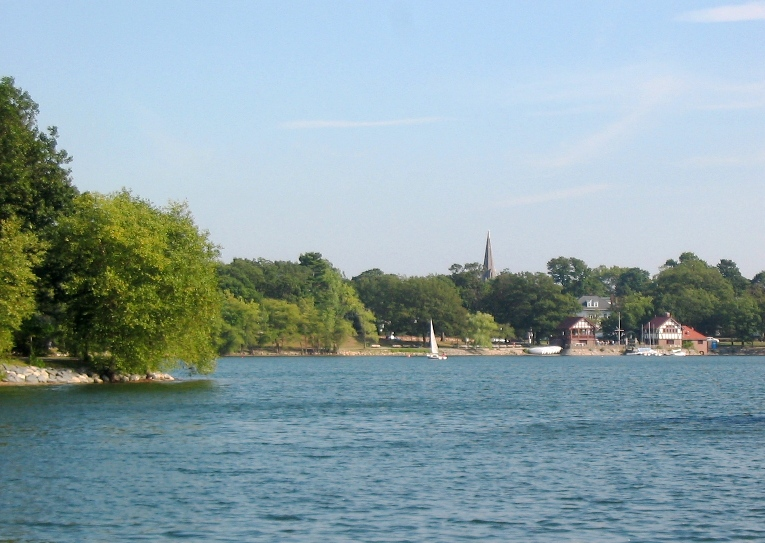
- Jamaica Pond, boathouse in distance, 2005

- Location within Massachusetts
- Location: Jamaica Plain, Massachusetts
- Coordinates: 42°19′0″N 71°7′13″W
- Type: kettle pond
- Primary outflows: Muddy River
- Surface area: 68 acres (28 ha)
- Max. depth: 51 feet (16 m)

Jamaica Pond is a kettle lake, part of the Emerald Necklace of parks in Boston designed by Frederick Law Olmsted. The pond and park are in the Jamaica Plain neighborhood of Boston, close to the border of Brookline. It is the source of the Muddy River, which drains into the lower Charles River.^{USGS 2005}

The pond has an area of about 68 acres (28 ha), and is 51 feet (16 m) deep at its center (MassWildlife map), making it the largest body of fresh water in Boston, and the largest natural freshwater body in the lower Charles River watershed. It is ringed by a 1.5-mile (2.4 km) walking path, and is an extremely popular destination for Bostonians for walking, fishing, rowing, and sailing. Around Halloween each year, the pond serves as the site for The Lantern Parade. Participants dress in their Halloween costumes and walk around the pond.

The pond once served as a reservoir for the City of Boston and the Town of West Roxbury, and it supplied ice in the winter to Boston and beyond.

According to the USGS, the name Jamaica derives from an Indian name meaning "abundance of beavers".

The pond's setting, Jamaica Park, was included in the Olmsted Park landscape complex that was placed on the National Register of Historic Places on December 8, 1971.

== History ==
The Jamaica Plain Ice Company employed 350 men in 1874, and harvested as much 5,000 tons of ice a day from Jamaica Pond.

Swimming in the pond has been prohibited since the mid-1970s following two drownings. Although it appears shallow near the shoreline, the pond—formed as a glacial kettle hole—drops off steeply, creating potentially hazardous conditions for swimmers.

The pond was once the site of a popular annual winter skating carnival. In 1929, this carnival was cancelled by Mayor Curley when cracks appeared on the ice, and 50,000 skaters had to be evacuated. In recent years, ice skating is no longer permitted on the pond.

Overlooking Jamaica Pond until its 2007 demolition was Pinebank Mansion, the summer home of Edward Newton Perkins.

== Gallery ==
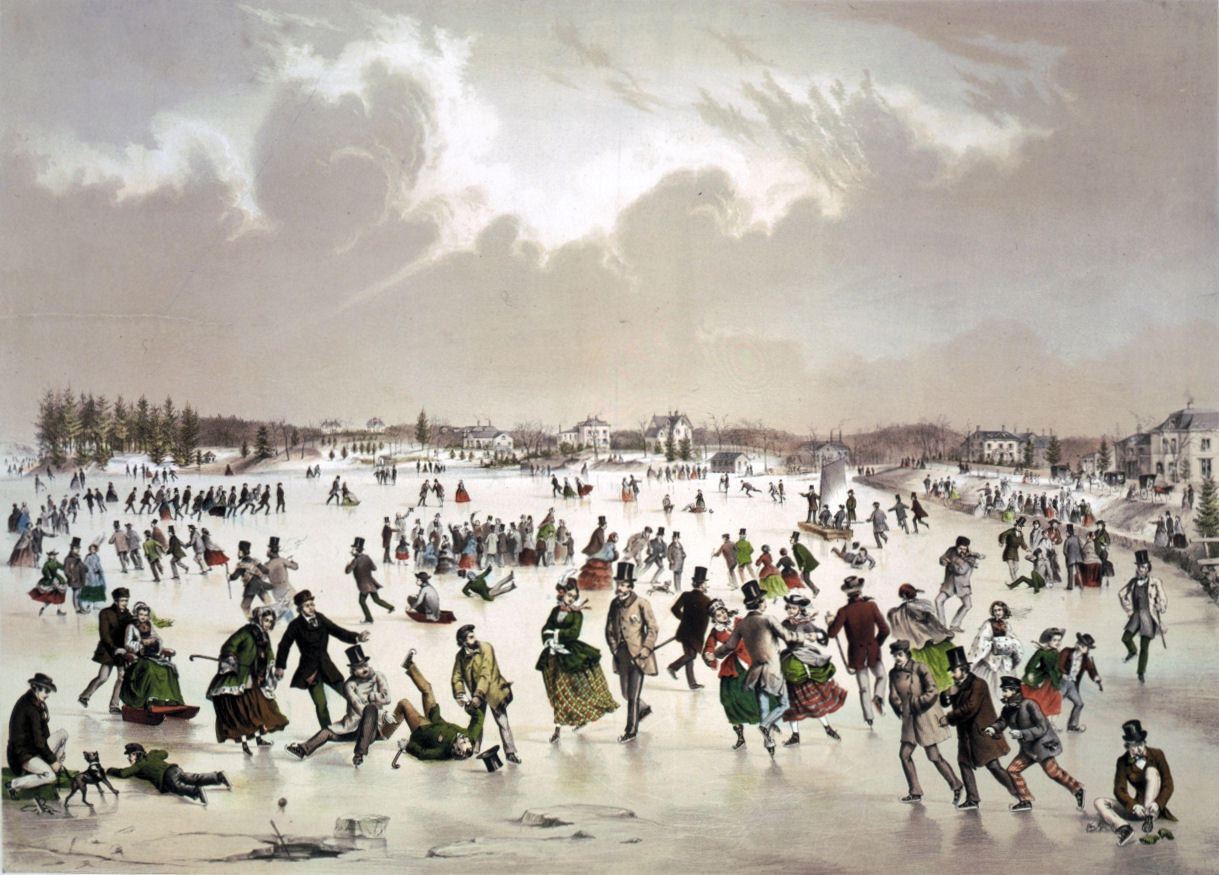
Skating on the pond, 1859

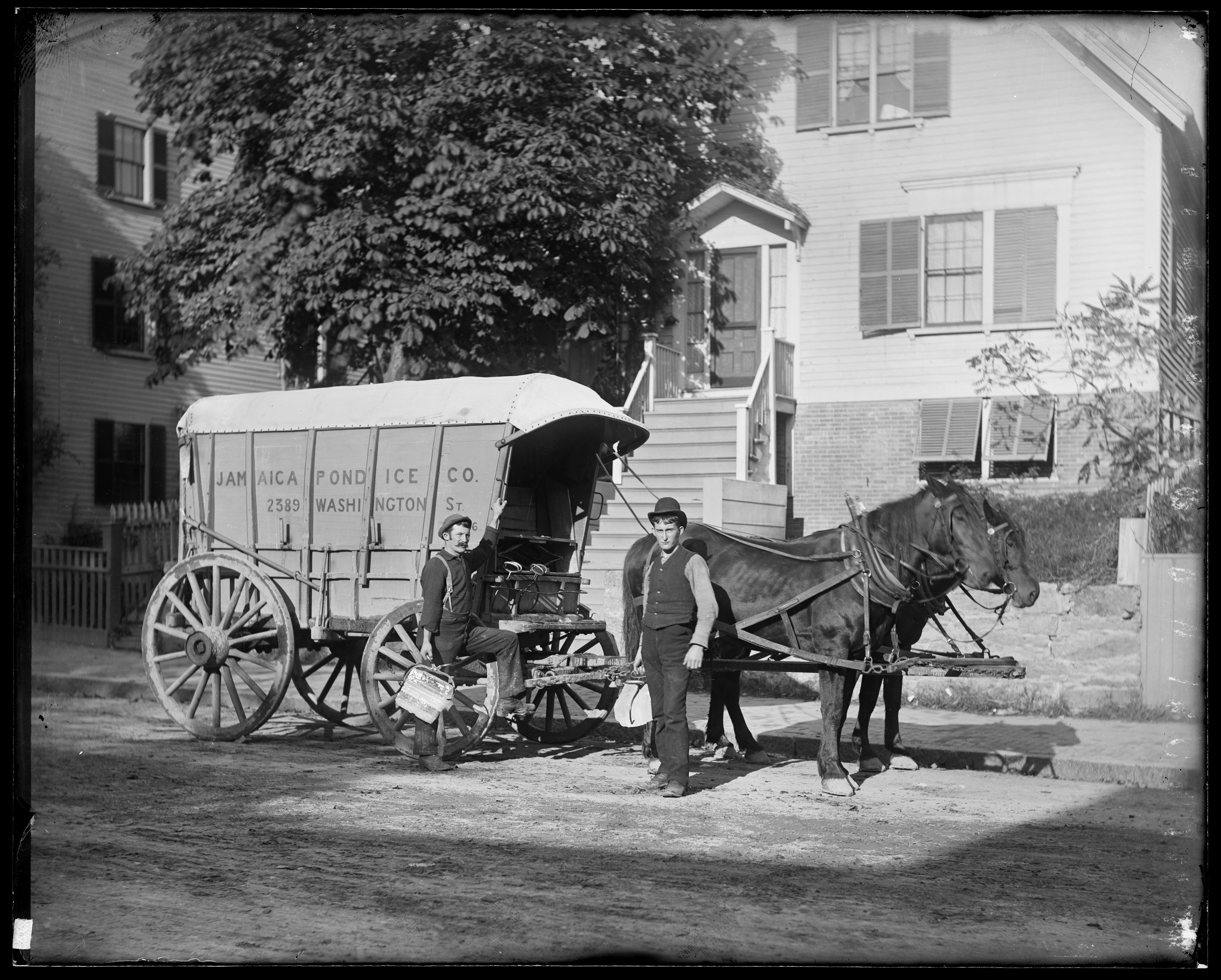
Ice delivery van, 1890

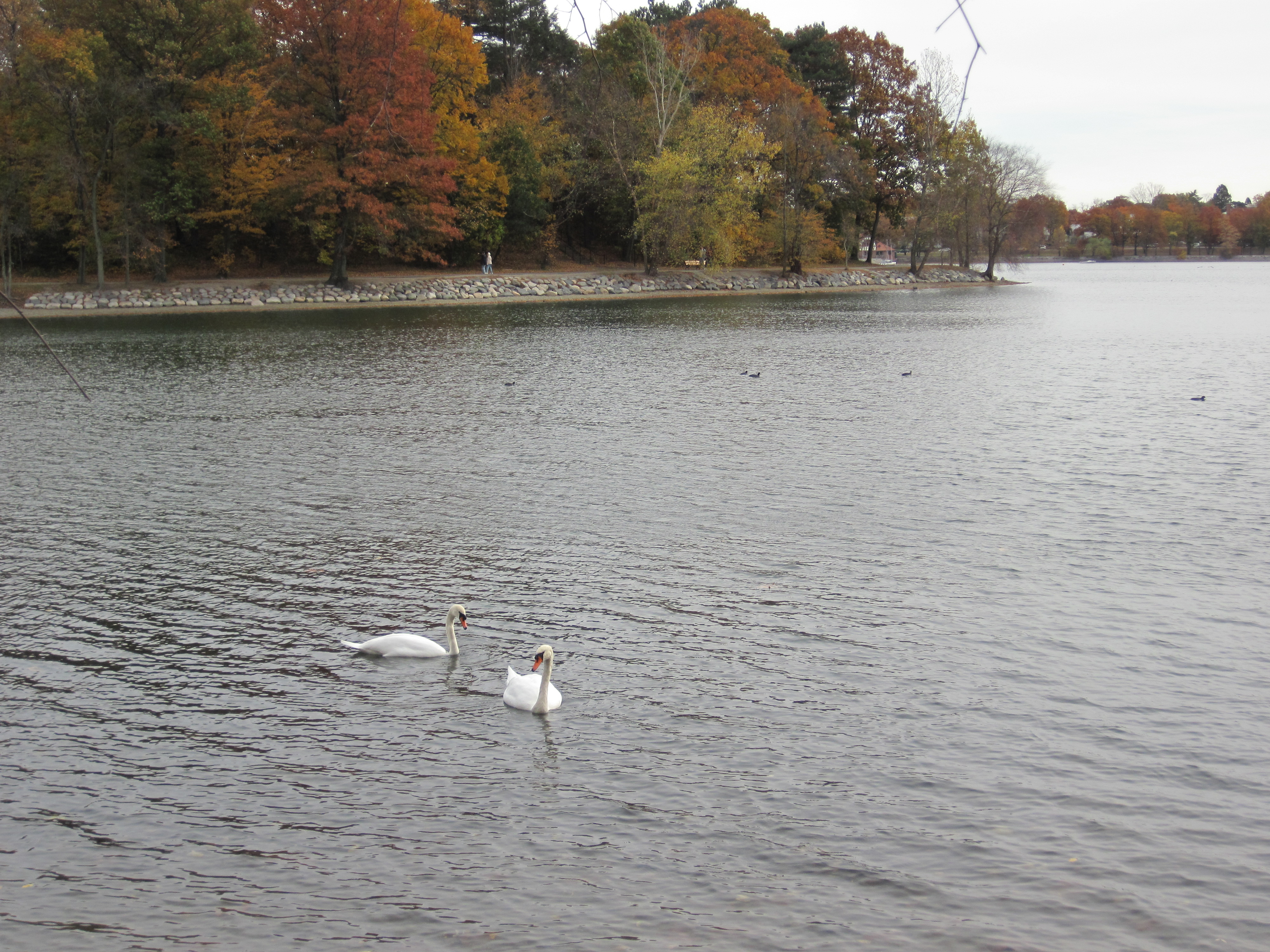
Swans, 2010

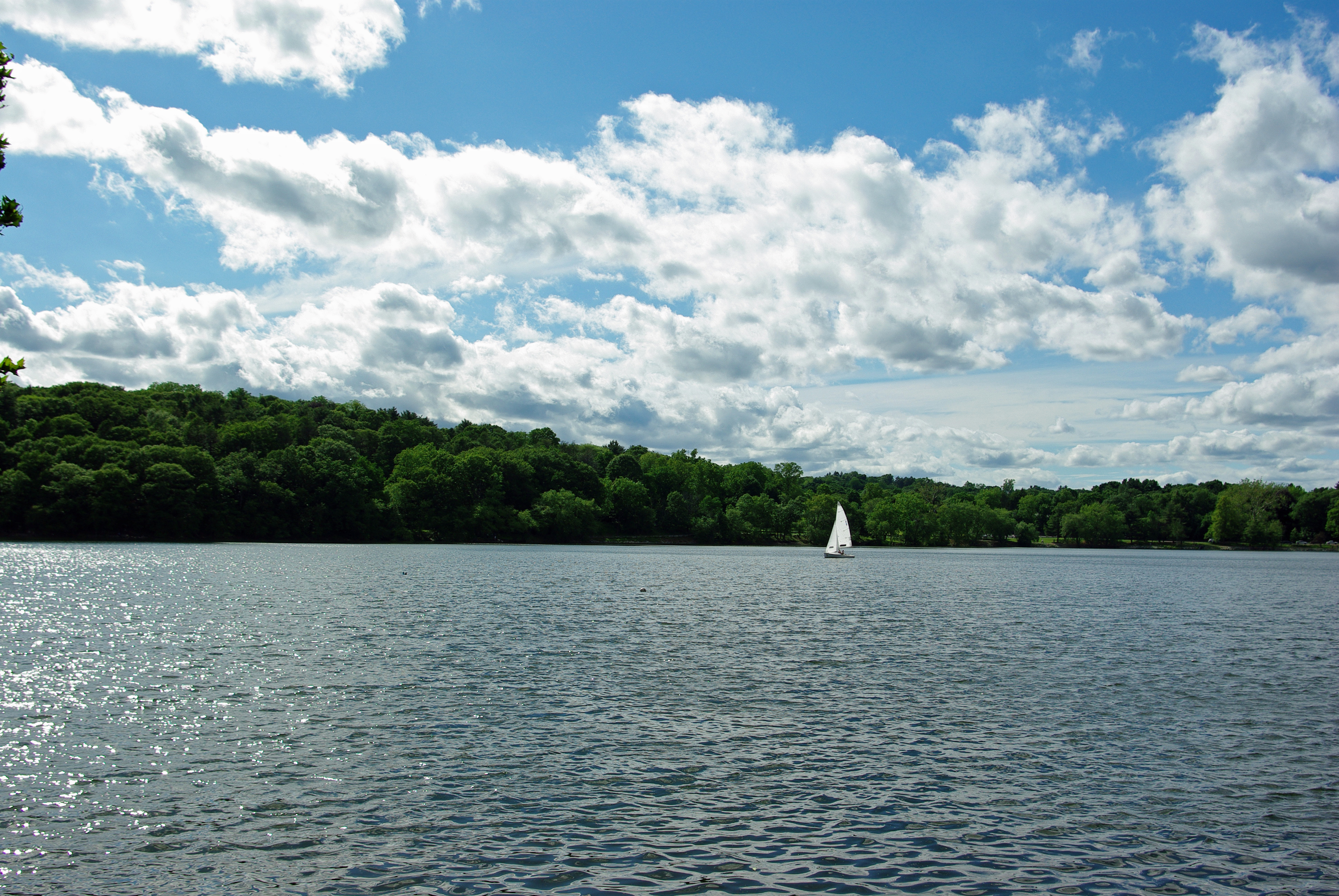
Sailboat on pond, 2013

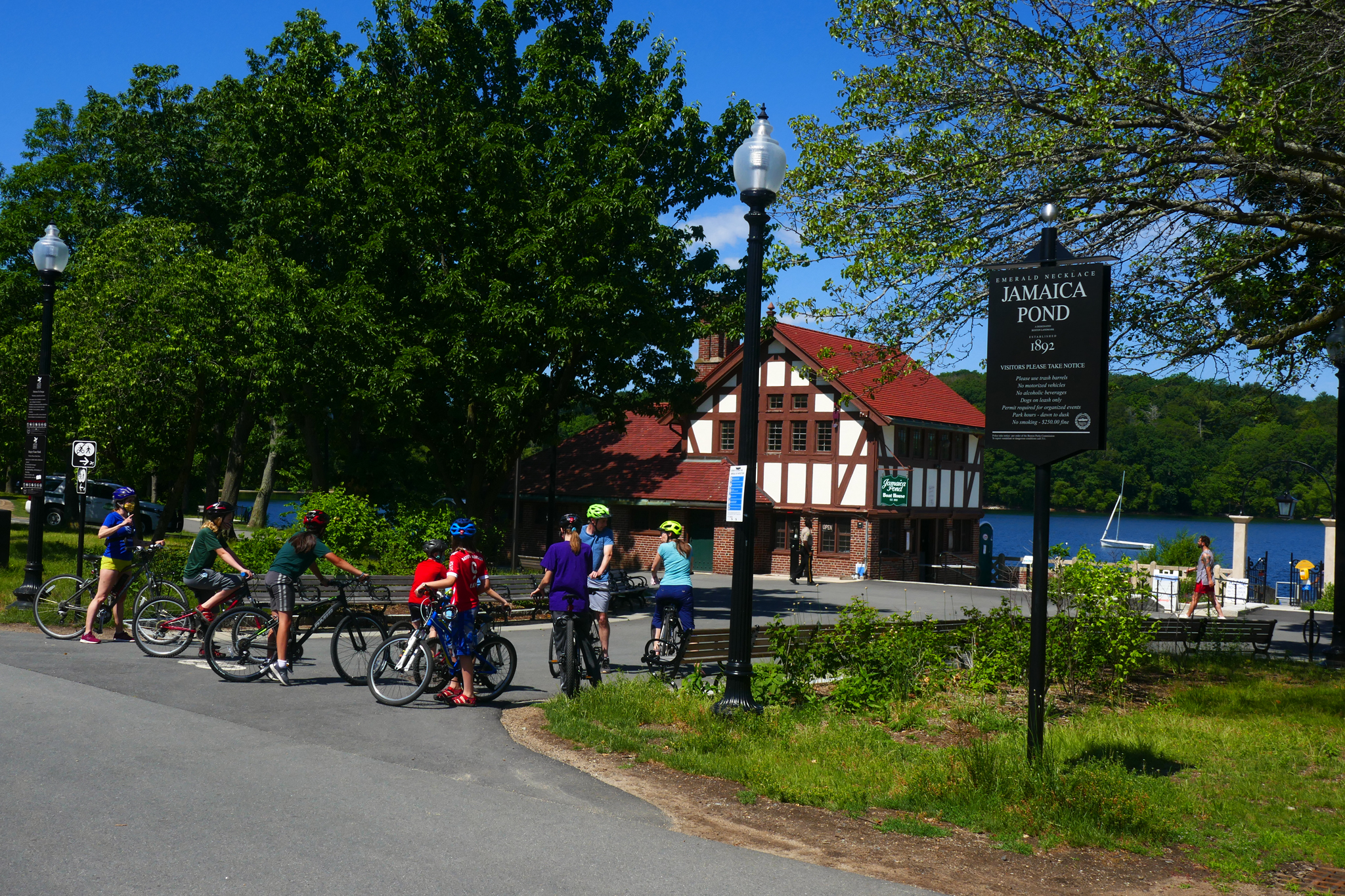
Bicyclists, 2021

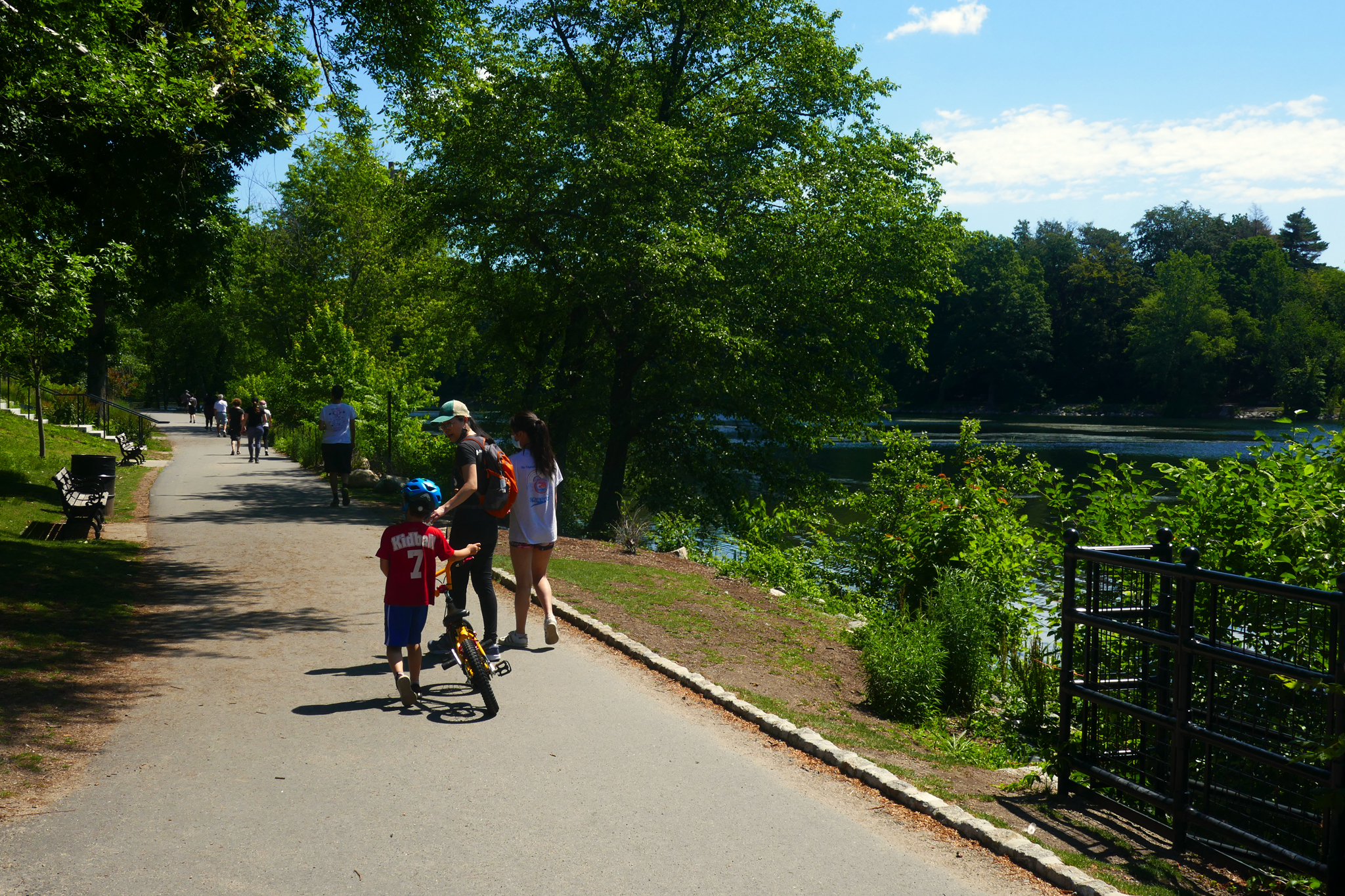
Walking path, 2021

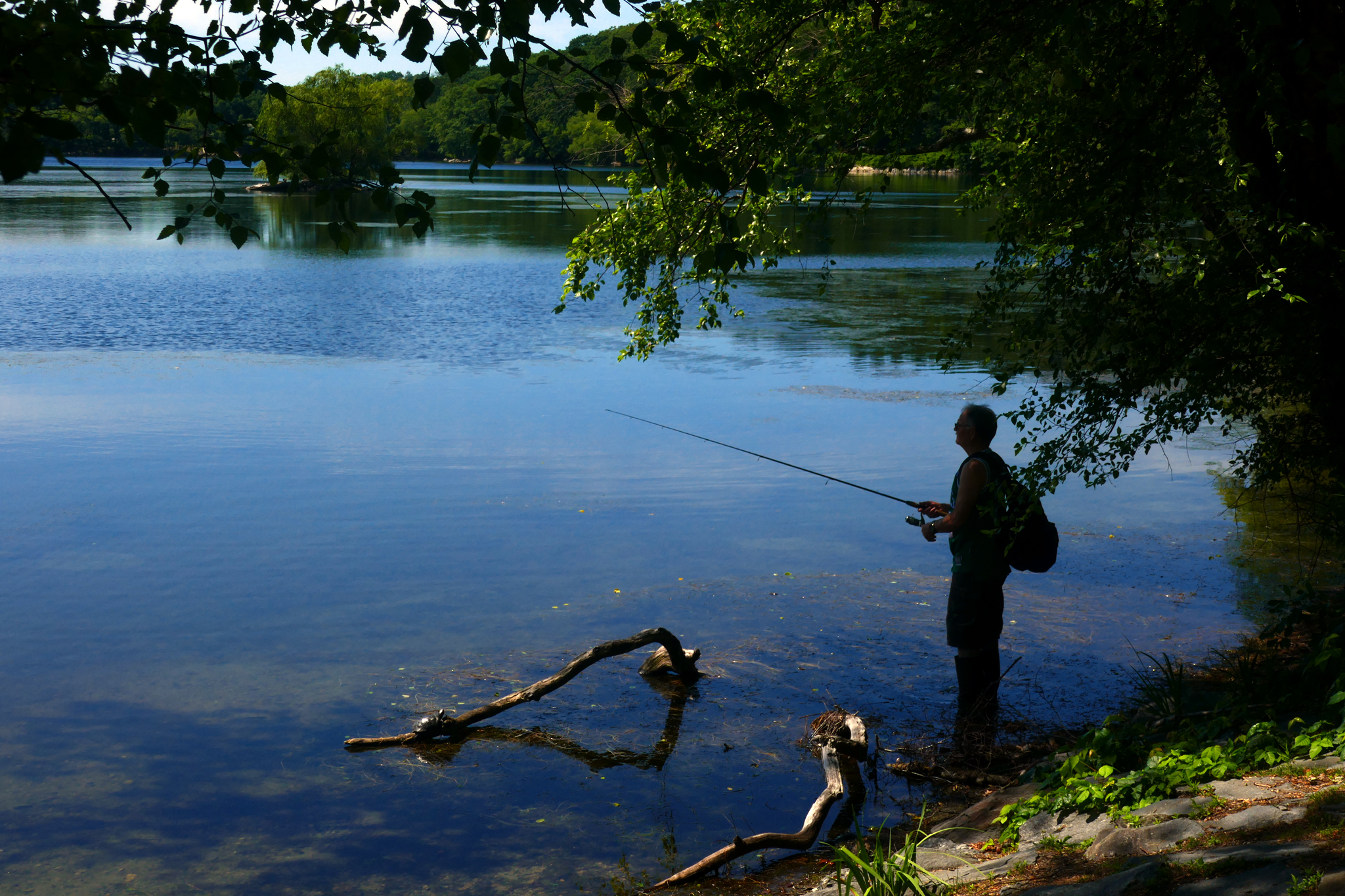
Fishing, 2021

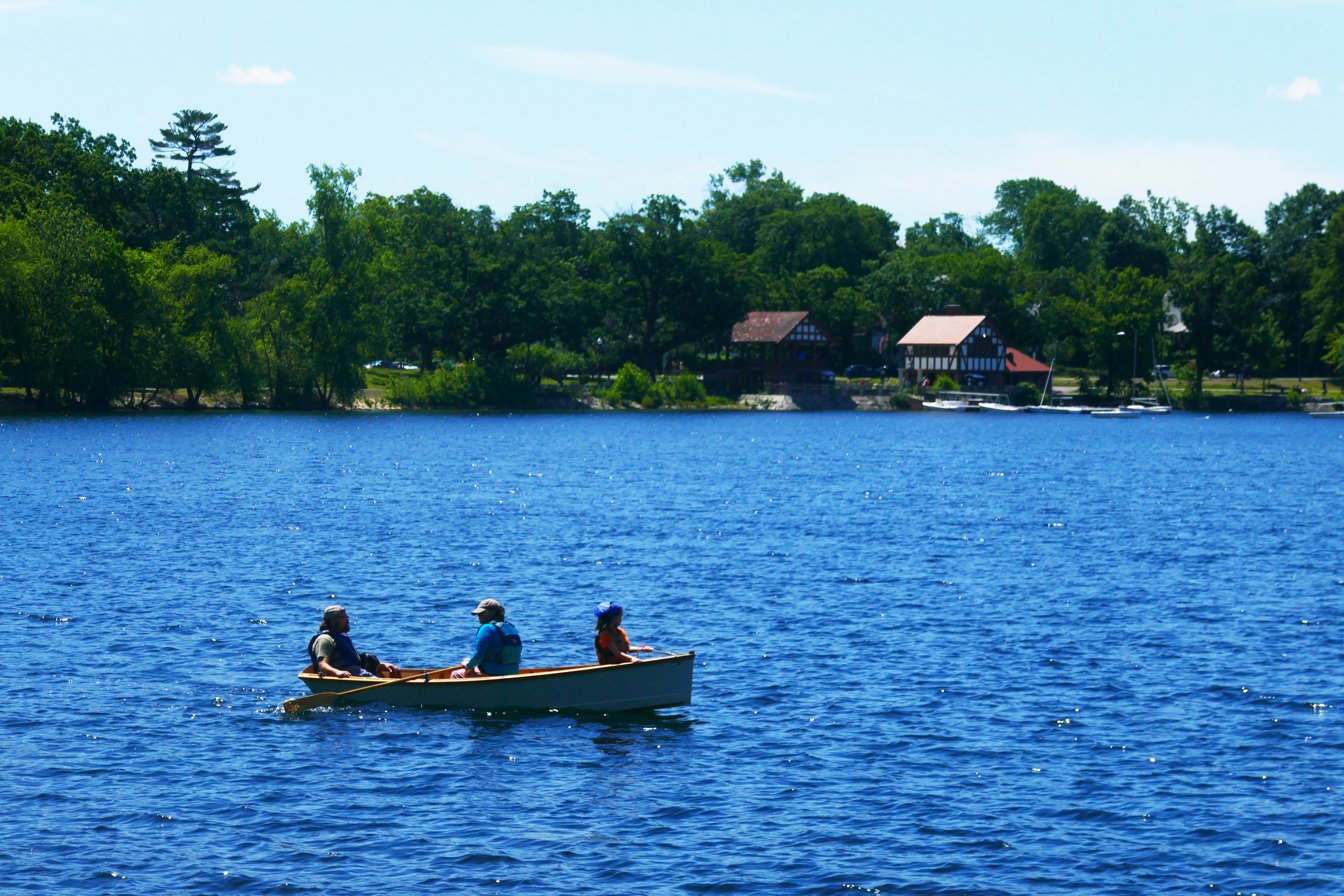
Rowboat, 2021

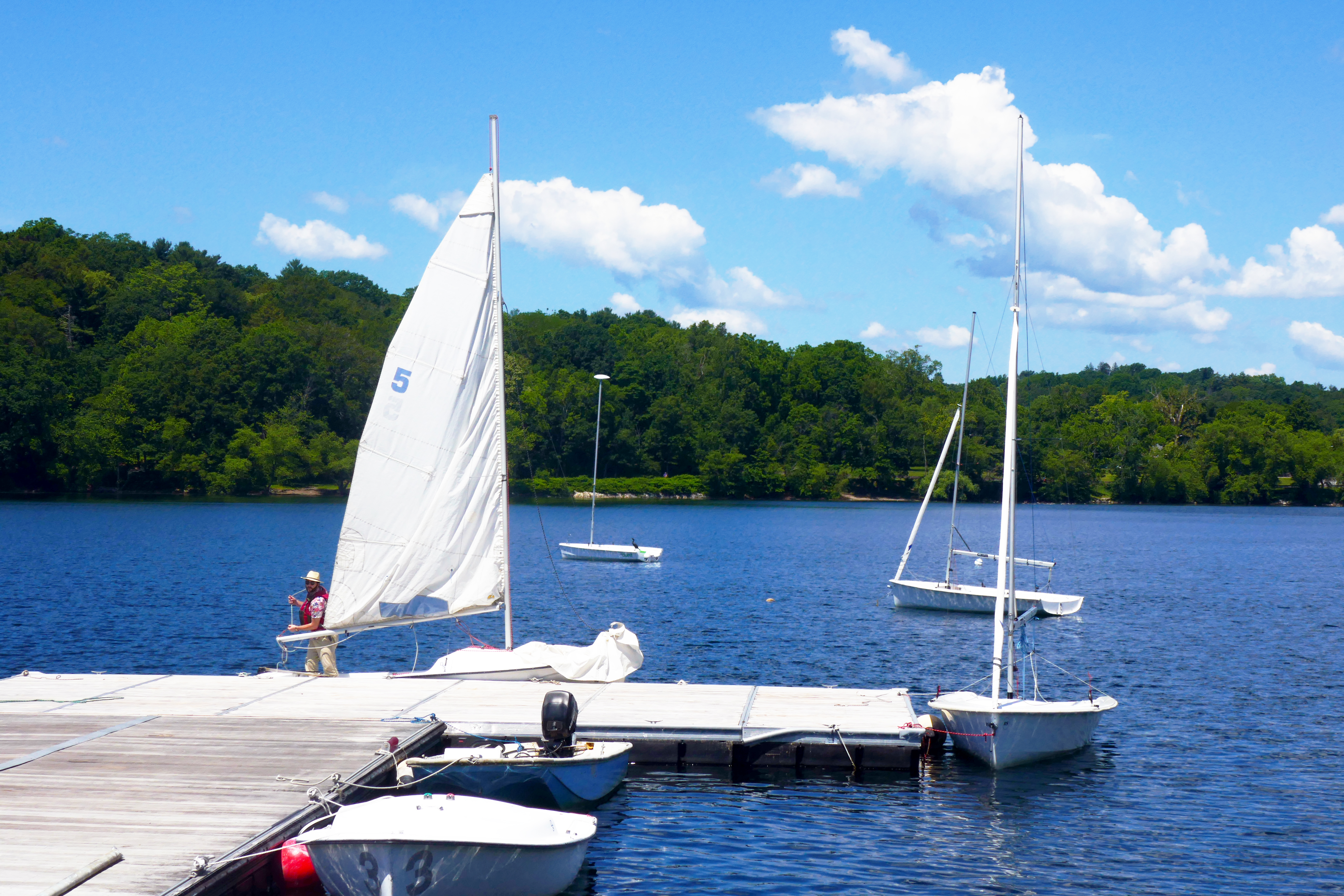
Renting a sailboat, 2021

Pond on a gray day. 2023
