= Pinebank Mansion =

Coordinates: 42.319629°N 71.119545°W

- Interactive map of the Pinebank Mansion area

General information
- Architectural style: Queen Anne
- Location: Jamaica Pond Park; Boston, Massachusetts, United States
- Construction started: 1868
- Completed: 1870
- Demolished: January 2007
- Client: Edward Perkins

Design and construction
- Architect: John Hubbard Sturgis

Pinebank Mansion was a Queen Anne style house sited on a hill overlooking Jamaica Pond in Boston, Massachusetts. Built in 1868 by John Hubbard Sturgis, it was the only mansion retained by Frederick Law Olmsted in his plans for the Emerald Necklace park system. It was the only original structure remaining in the park system at the time of its demolition in 2007.

== History ==
=== Perkins family home ===
The Queen-Anne Style Pinebank is the third house that sat on the site overlooking Jamaica Pond. The first house was built as a summer home in 1806 by James Perkins, senior partner in the China Trade shipping firms of James and Thomas Handasyd Perkins. His grandson, Edward Newton “Ned” Perkins, replaced the first house in 1848 with an elegant mansard-roofed home for year-round use. After this burned down in 1868, Ned instructed his cousin and architect John Hubbard Sturgis to build the third Pinebank house.

=== City of Boston ===
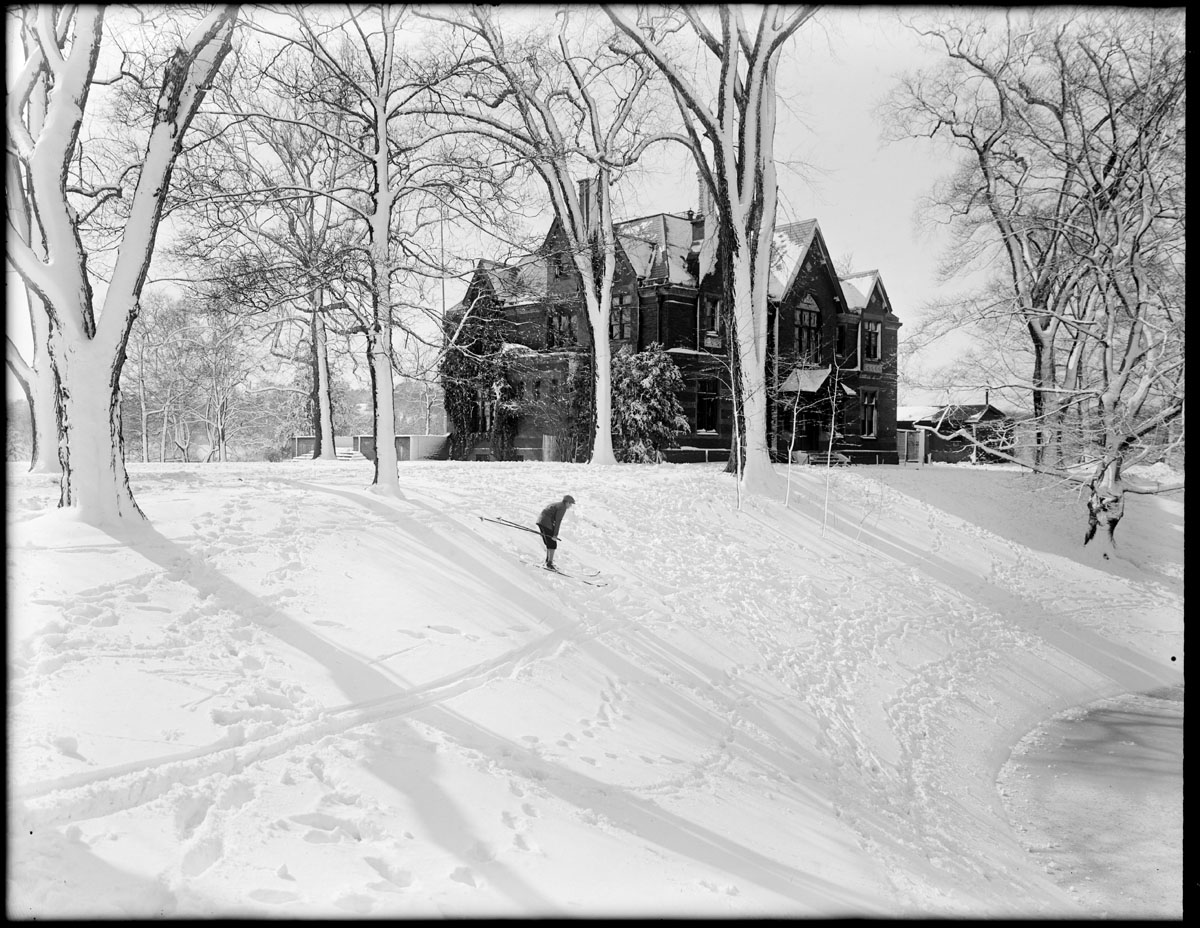
Pinebank Mansion in 1932

The city of Boston acquired Pinebank in 1892. It was damaged by a fire in 1895 and rebuilt, then used as the headquarters of the Boston Parks Commission. In 1913, Pinebank became the first home of Boston Children's Museum, and served in that role until 1936. From 1936 to 1970, it was occupied by the engineering department of the Boston Parks Commission. From 1970 to 1975, Pinebank was used for a city-sponsored community arts program. After that, fires in 1976 and 1978 destroyed the interior and seriously damaged the roof.

In 1978, Pinebank Mansion was listed on the State and National Register of Historic Places as part of the Olmsted Park System and in 1996, Historic Massachusetts listed Pinebank as one of the state's top ten most endangered historic places.

=== Demolition and afterward ===
The city released a structural analysis report that concluded that the building was unsalvageable on January 10, 2006 and expected the building to be demolished within the year. The Boston Landmarks Commission unanimously approved the demolition in a full vote on September 26, 2006. At that meeting, three different memorial designs were presented by Victor Walker of Walker Kluesing Design Group.

On December 19, 2006, the city's Inspectional Services Department ordered the Parks and Recreation Department to demolish the building, citing that the structure was a safety hazard. Demolition began on January 3, 2007. Some of the structure's debris was entombed in a vault in the foundation, to be used as reference material if the mansion is one day rebuilt.

The memorial design chosen delineates the mansion's perimeter in granite, set flush with the ground, and the outline filled with grass. The front of the house will be marked with a low brick, granite-topped wall that can be used as a bench, and up to three metal signs will contain information on the former building. The exterior steps, purchased at auction when Hancock Manor was demolished and installed in 1864, were refurbished in 2008. A short flight of stairs was added, along with handrails.
