= John Marriott Blashfield =

English property developer and mosaic floor and ornamental terracotta manufacturer

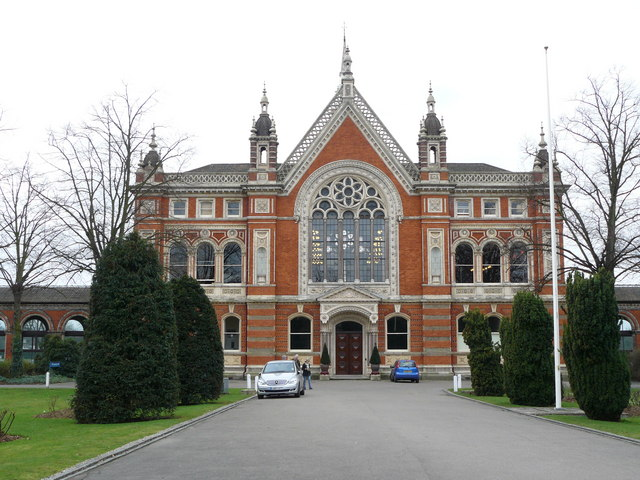
- Dulwich College, Main Entrance – showing ornamental terracotta by Blashfield.
- Born: 1 November 1811 ?London
- Died: 15 December 1882 (aged 71); 17 Great College Street, London
- Occupation: Architect
- Awards: Paris Exhibition 1867
- Practice: Wyatt, Parker & Co Stamford Terracotta Company
- Buildings: Dulwich College and the Boston Museum of Fine Arts

John Marriott Blashfield (1811–1882) was a property developer and mosaic floor and ornamental terracotta manufacturer. He originally worked for the cement makers Wyatt, Parker and & Co in Millwall, but moved the business to Stamford in Lincolnshire in 1858, when it was renamed The Stamford Terracotta Company.

== Early career ==
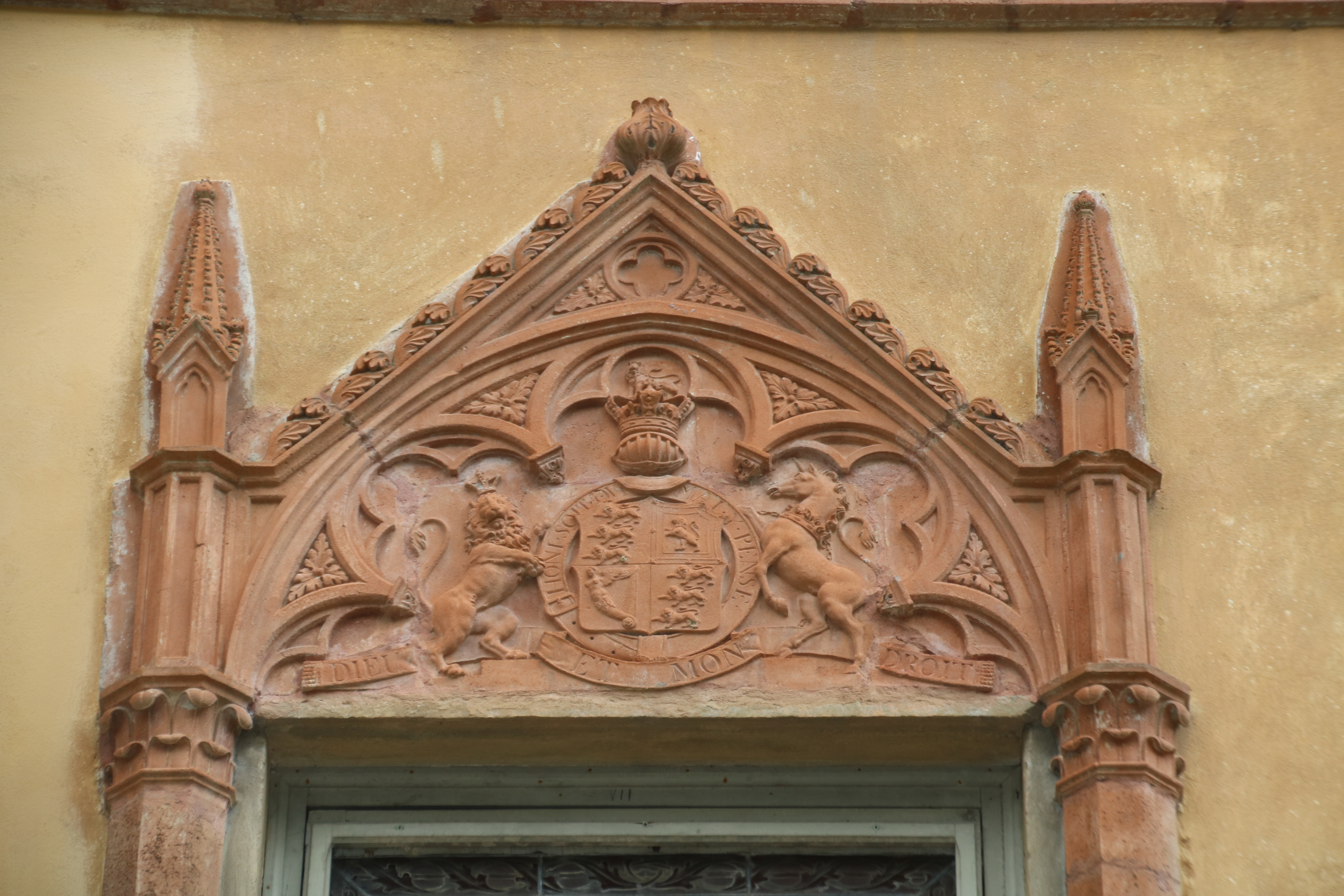
Royal arms from the English Church, Bagni di Lucca

Blashfield was Mintons representative in London and a partner in the firm of Wyatt, Parker & Co of Millwall, manufacturers of cement, scagliola and mosaic pavements, which he took over in 1846. In 1843 he published a small booklet on mosaics he had designed and in 1843/45 he was responsible for the mosaic floor at the old Conservative Club in St James's Street, London. He became interested in the manufacture of terracotta around 1839 when he engaged J. G. Bubb on experimental terracotta work for model cottages at Canford Magna, Dorset. This appears to have led to his manufacturing terracotta ornamentation for buildings. In the early 1840s he supplied an extensive series of gothic terracotta mouldings for the English Church at Bagni di Lucca in Tuscany. In the mid 1840s he started working with leading English sculptors, most notably John Bell and William Theed the Younger, for whom he produced terracotta versions of sculptures which were originally sculpted in marble or cast in iron.

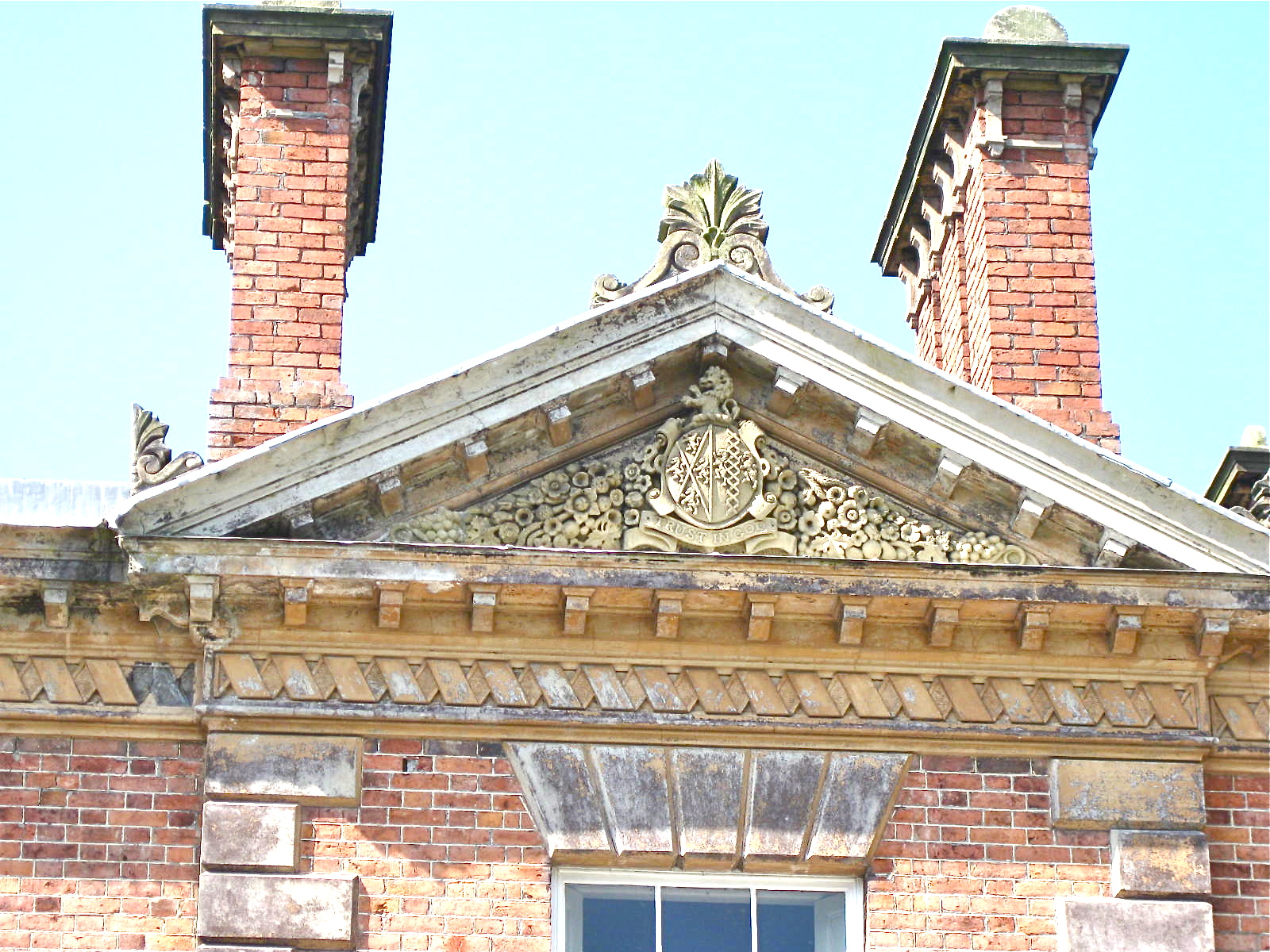
Garthmyl Hall Pediment showing terracotta including armorial and ornamented chimney stacks designed by J. K. Colling

Blashfield was well connected and patronised by some of the leading architects, particularly the Wyatts, Sydney Smirke and Charles Barry Jr. Blashfield also derived many of his ideas for designs from the architects and illustrators Owen Jones and James Kellaway Colling. As result of the popularity of terracotta pieces at the Great Exhibition of 1851, he turned increasingly towards the manufacture of garden furniture, parapets and urns. It has been claimed that at about this time he purchased the moulds from Eleanor Coade's Lambeth works that had been used to produce Coade Stone, but this has been disputed as Coade's bankruptcy was some years before and few of his designs resemble those of Coade, except for the shape of some of the urns. The buff colour and texture of Blashfield's Terracotta can resemble the appearance of Coade stone. Blashfield's main works was in Millwall but he had showrooms at Praed Street adjacent to the Edgware Road in Paddington. In the 1851 Balshfield was still describing himself as a “cement manufacturer’’ and at that time was employing 5 Clerks and 35 Men.

With the reconstruction of the Crystal Palace at Sydenham in 1854 Blashfield was awarded the contract, to cast a series of colossal terracotta statues representing Australia, California, Birmingham and Sheffield by John Bell for display in the sculpture gallery at Crystal Palace. The sculptures were later destroyed when the Crystal Palace was burnt down. To publicise his terracottas Blashfield published in 1855 An Account of the History and Manufacture of Ancient and Modern Terra Cotta and several catalogues, including A Catalogue of Five Hundred Articles in 1857. These terracottas included replicas of classical statuary and vases, such as the Niobe group in the Uffizi and the Borghese and Medici vases. Blashfield was proud of the fact that his products were hand-finished and taken from the best moulds.

== Development of Kensington Palace Gardens ==
The Queen’s Road came into existence in 1841 when the Crown Estate sold off land which had formerly been part of the kitchen gardens of Kensington Palace. The Commissioners of Woods and Forests took charge of the letting of this newly available land and they planned for a series of detached villas, each situated within its own plot of land. Blashfield leased twenty of the thirty-three plots for building in July 1843. Blashfield’s first house was one of the most notable of the entire street. Built between 1843–6, No.8 Kensington Palace Gardens was designed by Owen Jones (1809–1874). Influenced by Islamic architecture he encountered in Egypt, Turkey and Spain during his early twenties. Jones’s plans for the house included a significant amount of ‘Moresque’ design. After this Blashfield struggled to find buyers for his houses, eventually going bankrupt in 1847. He appears to have kept this enterprise separate from his manufacturing business and continued to develop the latter.

== Stamford Terracotta Company ==
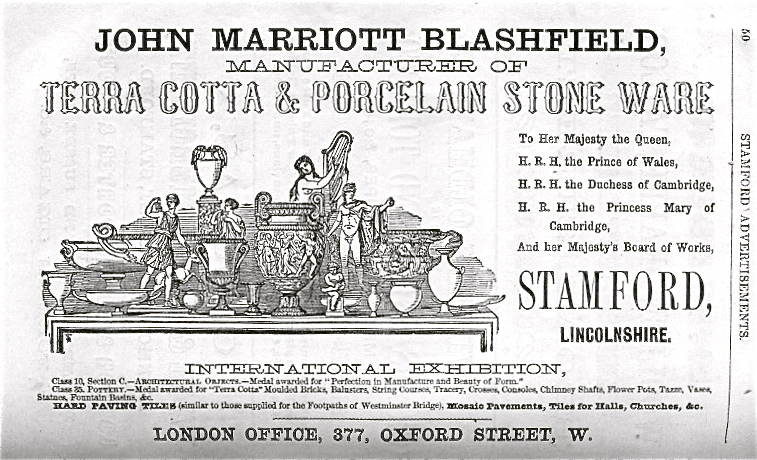
Advertisement for Blashfield's Terracotta 1863

In 1859 terracotta production was transferred from London to Stamford, Lincolnshire, in order to exploit the local Jurassic clays, which were particularly suitable for terracotta production. The Wharf Road works were considerably larger than Blashfield's London premises and in the 1861 census he was calling himself Terra Cotta Manufacturer and Pottery Company and was employing 46 Men and 13 Boys. Most of the clay he used was from brickyards in the vicinity of Stamford at Wakerley, and Uffington, and Lower Estuarine clays from St Martin's, Stamford, but he still imported some Ball clays via Poole in Dorset and elsewhere from clay pits near the south coast.

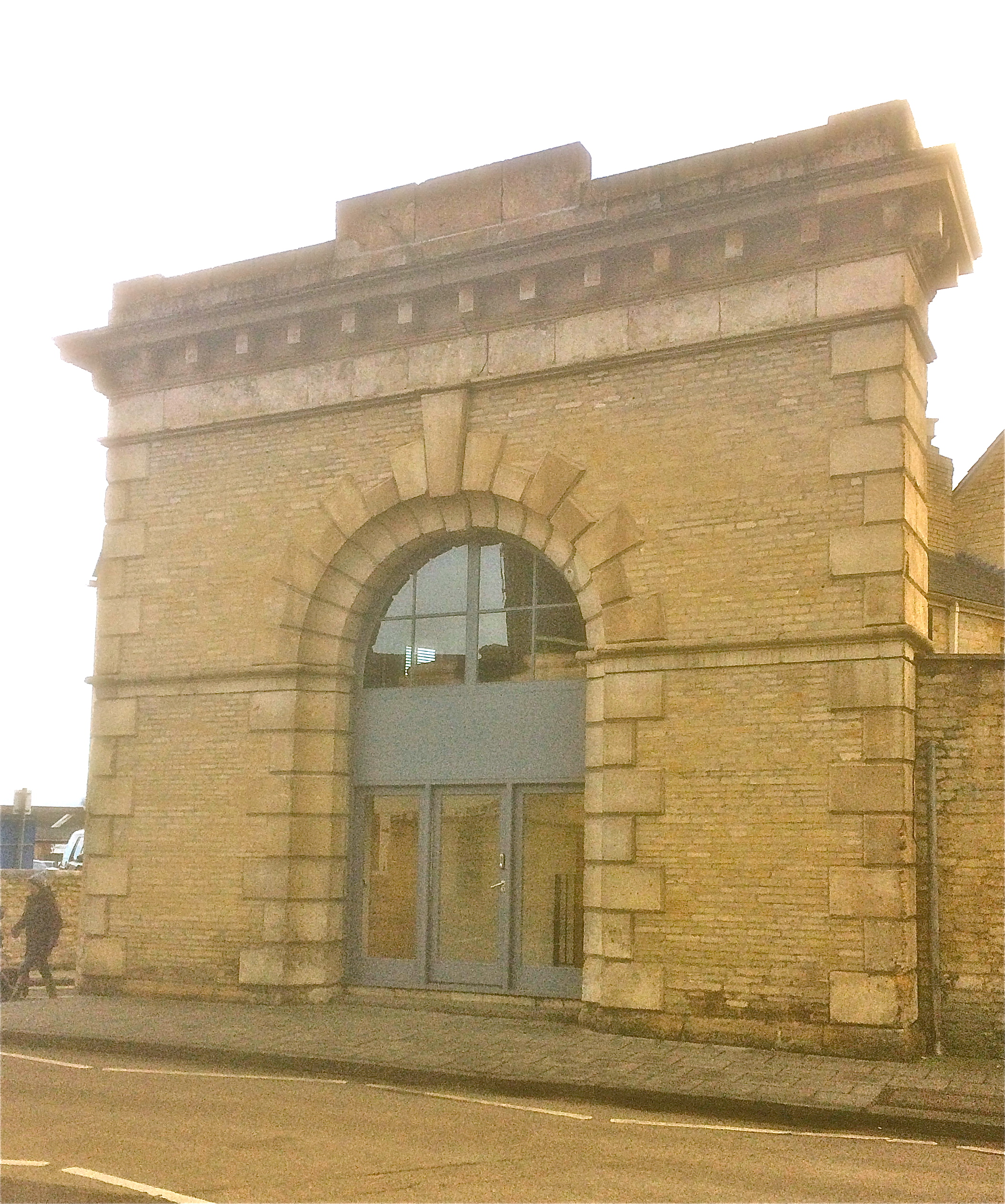
Gate Arch to Blashfield's works, Wharf Road, Stamford

Blashfield had taken over Grant's iron foundry in Stamford, which was in Wharf Road and adjacent to the River Welland, which was convenient for bringing clay in and shipping terracotta out. The gateway to Blashfield's Terracotta works, which was formerly the gateway to Grant's Ironworks still stands in Wharf Road in Stamford, although it has been slightly re-positioned. The opening of the new works attracted considerable public interest. The local aristocracy attended the drawing of the first kiln and one of the busts of the Queen that had been fired was presented to her the following day. In 1865 the firm made a statue of Prince Albert from a model by William Theed the younger for the infirmary at Bishop's Waltham, Hants. It was of ‘clays from the estate of Mr Arthur Helps, at Bishops Waltham, and clay from the Marquis of Exeter’s celebrated pit at Wakerley, mixed with feldspar and Lynn sand’ and was assembled inside the kiln and fired in one piece. It emerged from the kiln ‘without flaw’ and ‘as hard as black marble’. This use of complex blends of ingredients and the highly wrought finish were typical of Blashfield's scientific approach to terracotta production.

== Attempted expansion into the American market and bankruptcy ==
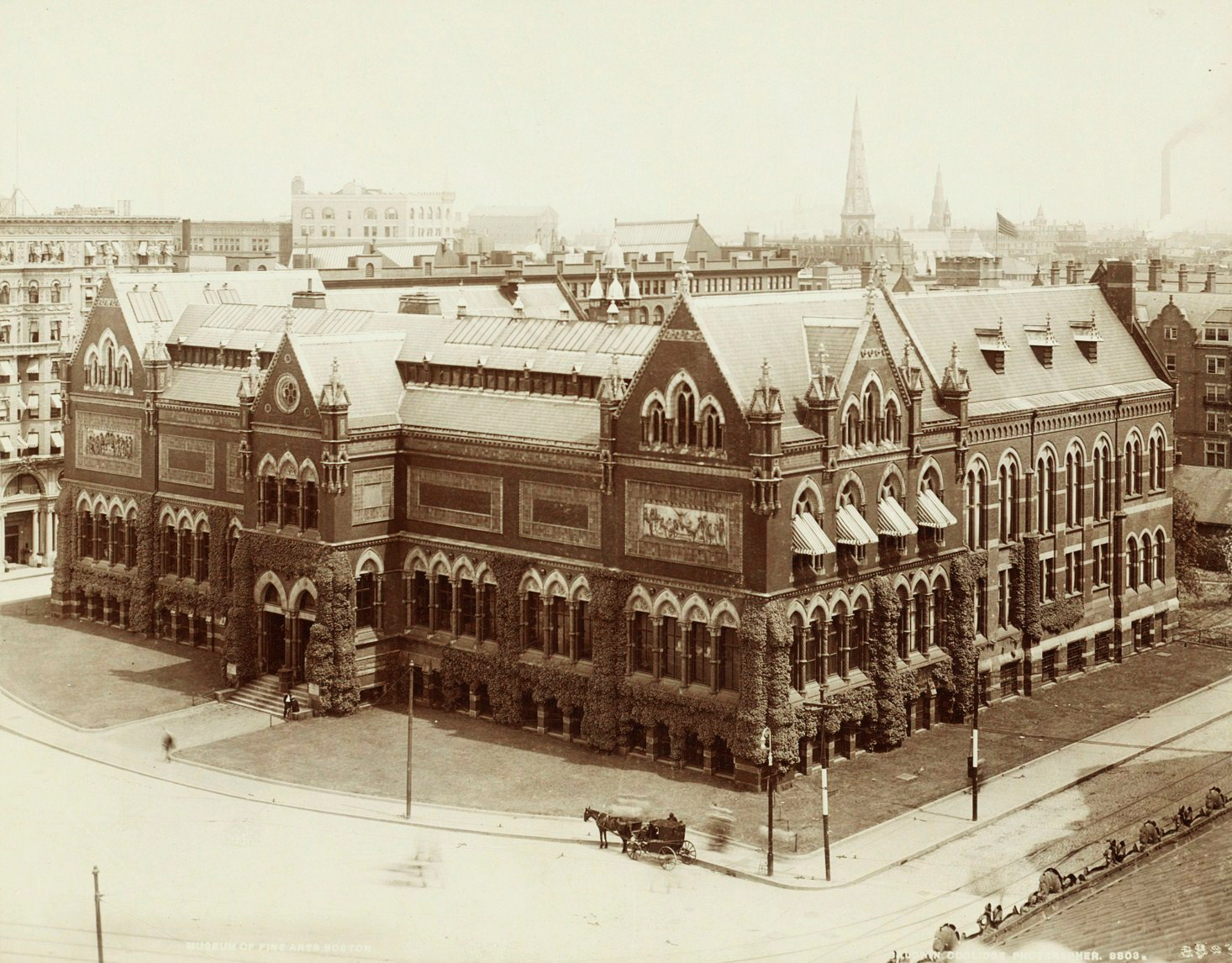
Museum of Fine Arts in Boston, demolished 1906, showing Blashfield's terracotta

While still in London Blashfield had been working with the architect and designer James Kellaway Colling who was an associate or partner of the American architect John Hubbard Sturgis. When Sturgis returned to Boston in the US in 1861, he started importing terracotta from Stamford for his first project "Pinebank" near Boston. This was followed by the much more prestigious project, supplying terracotta ornament and decorative panels (designed by Colling) for the Museum of Fine Arts in Boston. He seriously underestimated the logistical difficulties involved in shipping large consignments of fragile blocks across the Atlantic. He soon realised that he had accepted an uneconomic contract and his company began to incur serious debts when payments were delayed. Delivery of one consignment was held back when a ship had to turn back to England and other payments were delayed when the building contractors were unable to relate the pieces supplied to the intended spaces on the building. From the beginning of 1873 Blashfield was requesting money from his American clients with increasing desperation and by December 1874 the Stamford works, including models, moulds and machinery, was offered for sale. In the following month Blashfield announced that the firm was being wound up and he was declared bankrupt in 1878. After the collapse of the business a number of Blashfield's former employees emigrated to America, where they played an important role in the introduction of architectural terracotta. He died "after a short illness of bronchitis followed by paralysis" on 15 December 1882.

=== Blashfield's work in Stamford ===
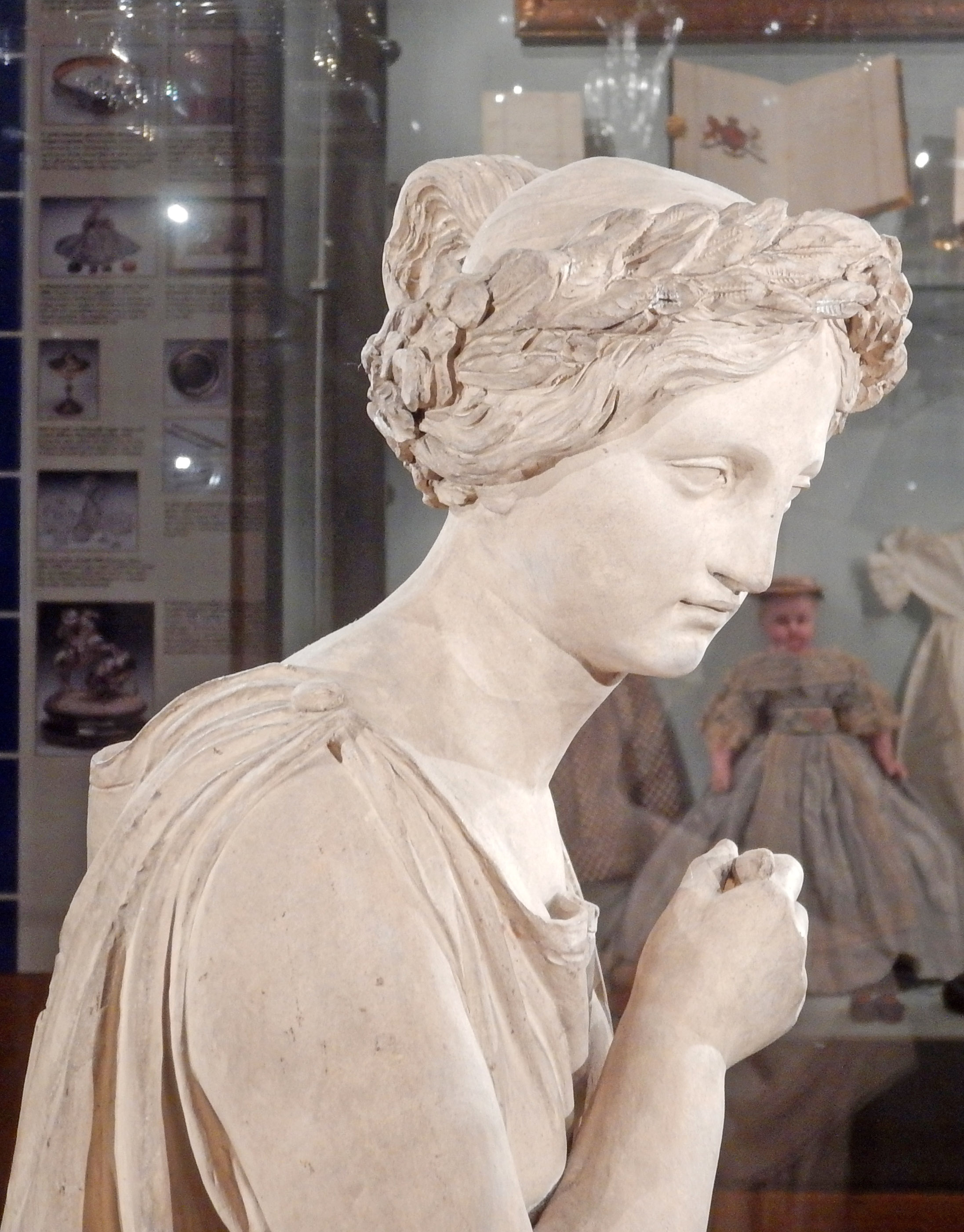
Allegorical figure of literature at Burghley House

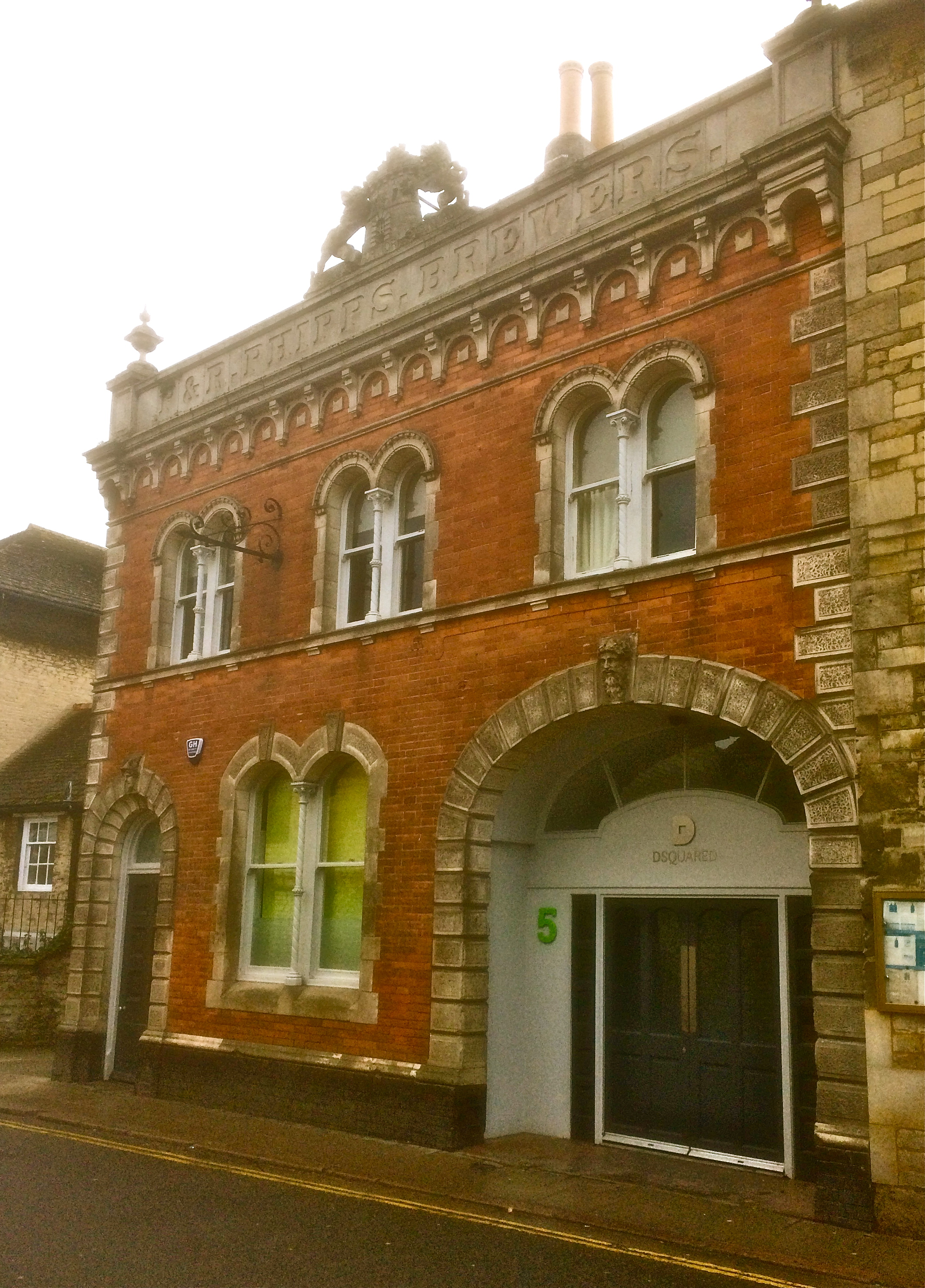
Former Scotgate Inn, in Scotgate, Stamford

Some buildings in Stamford would appear to be using Blashfield's terracotta for decorative dressing, most notably the former Scotgate Inn. This is a two-storey building formerly used as a depot for P & R Phipps. Parapet with panels at quoins supporting carved urns, with the name 'P & R Phipps, Brewers' below crest of castle with lion supporters and motto. Head of Hermes over doorway and carriage door to right of eight panels, vermiculated rusticated arch with monogram on keystone. It is also used for a shop at 30 High Street.

Some terracotta production was carried out in Stamford apart from at Blashfield's works. Henry Lumby was noted as a terracotta manufacturer on a site in St Martin's, Stamford in 1868 and 1872 and in 1863 Charles Joseph Whitton had a works in London Road.

=== Awards ===
- 1862 Medal awarded – International Exhibition.
- 1865 Medal Awarded – Dublin International Exhibition.
- 1867 Medal Awarded – Paris Exhibition.

=== Publications and trade catalogues ===
- 1843 Tesselated Pavements designed by J. M. Blashfield. Six plates
- 1855 An account of the history and manufacture of ancient and modern terra cotta; And of its use in architecture as a durable and elegant material for decoration. London : Published by John Weale, 59, High Holborn
- 1857 A Selection of Vases, Statues, Busts, & c. from Terra-Cottas. Plates, with an introduction. Published by John Weale, 59, High Holborn
- 1857 A catalogue of five hundred articles, made of patent Terra cotta. London.
- 1859 Ancient and modern pottery a paper read at Stamford, 6 September 1859
- 1860 A catalogue of seven hundred articles: Made in patent terra cotta, and red and cane-coloured pottery..
- 1868 Terra Cotta Chimney Shafts, Chimney Pots, (8 Plates)., manufactured by J. M. Blashfield bound with Examples of Terracotta Balustrades, Panels or Perforated Tracery Ornament, Terminals, etc. for Parapets, Terraces etc. (8 Plates). bound with ‘‘Domestic Architecture:Terra Cotta Doorways, Windows, Balconies, Consoles, Copings, Plinths, Date and Monogram Panels etc.. (8 Plates), bound with ‘‘Examples of Terra Cotta Consoles, Trusses, Console Cappings, Brackets, Pilasters, &c for Doorways, Windows, Shop Fronts &c (8 Plates) bound with Examples of Terra Cotta Cornices, String Courses, Moulded Bricks Etc. (8 Plates)Published by J.M. Blashfield, Stamford, January 1868–

== Examples of Blashfields Work ==
=== Dated work ===
- 1843–45. Mosaic flooring in the saloon of the old Conservative Club, St James's Street, London SW1. Sydney Smirke and George Basevi, 1843–45; mosaic by John Marriott Blashfield.

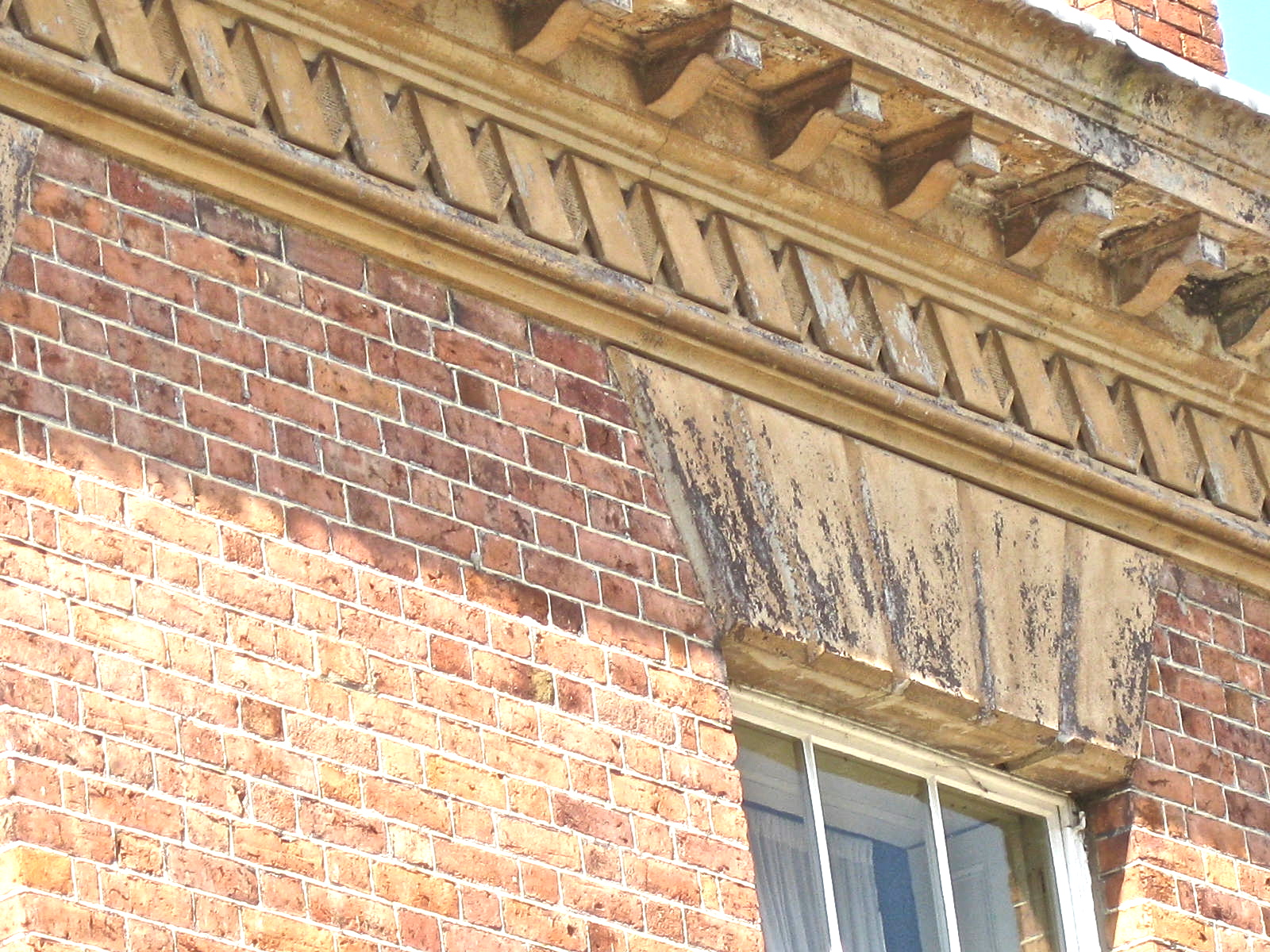
Garthmyl Hall. Terracotta frieze and consoles below eaves

- 1856. Albany, Liverpool. Possible use of Blashfield’s Terracotta for friezes and dressings. Designs by J. K. Colling.
- 1859 Garthmyl Hall, Berriew, Montgomeryshire. Designs by J. K. Colling. Ornamental friezes and consoles. Coat of arms with foliage and roses.
- 1854 Crystal Palace, Sydenham. Statues of Australia, California, Birmingham and Sheffield (modelled by John Bell)
- 1854 Triton fountain (modelled by John Bell) for the Radcliffe Infirmary, Oxford.
- 1863–1873 Wedgwood Institute, Burslem, Stoke-on-Trent. Processes of the pottery industry, relief panels (modelled by Matthew Eden) The terracotta panels of the processes of industry were modelled by Mathew Eden and produced by John Marriott Blashfield.
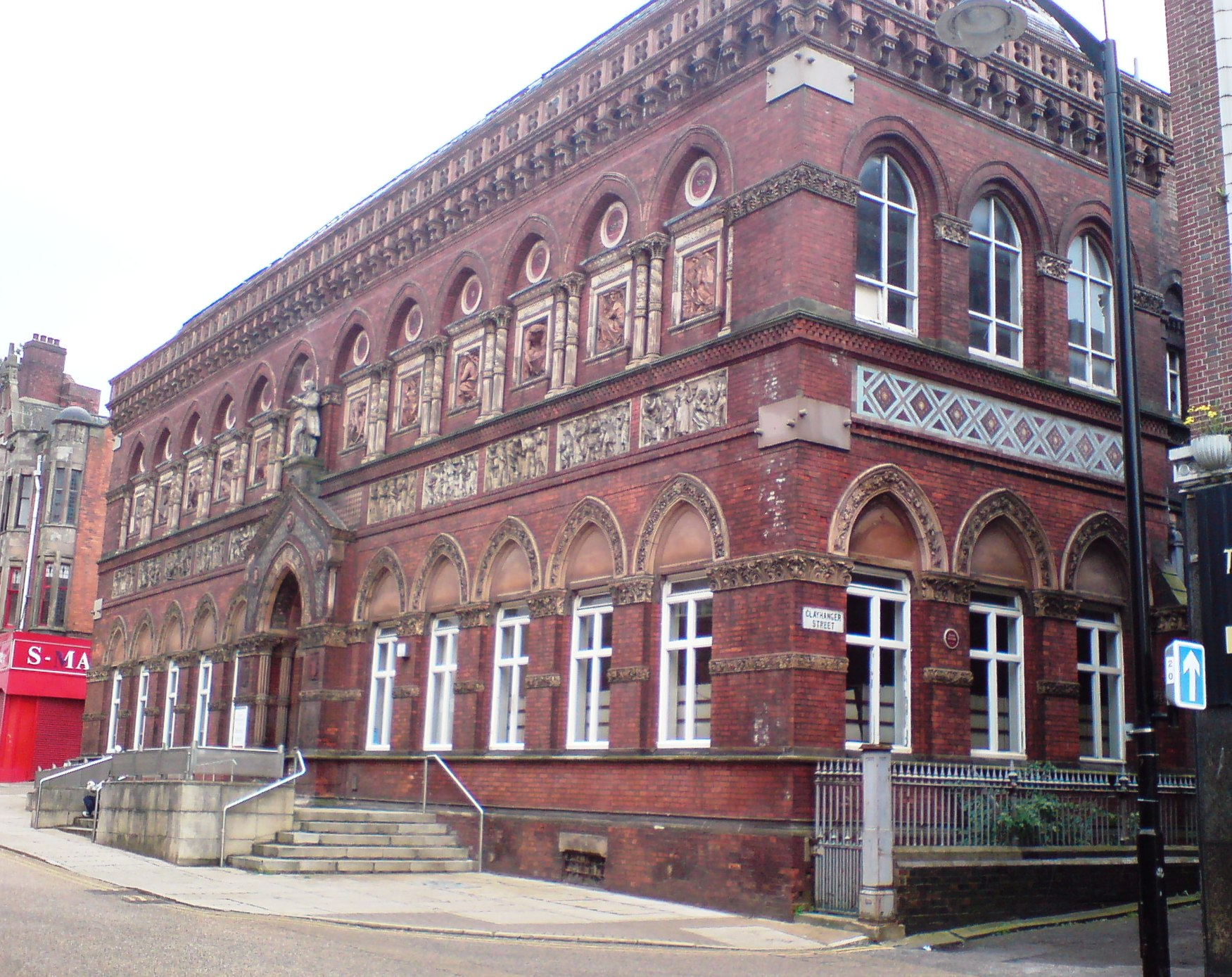
  Josiah Wedgwood Memorial Institute, Stoke-on-Trent
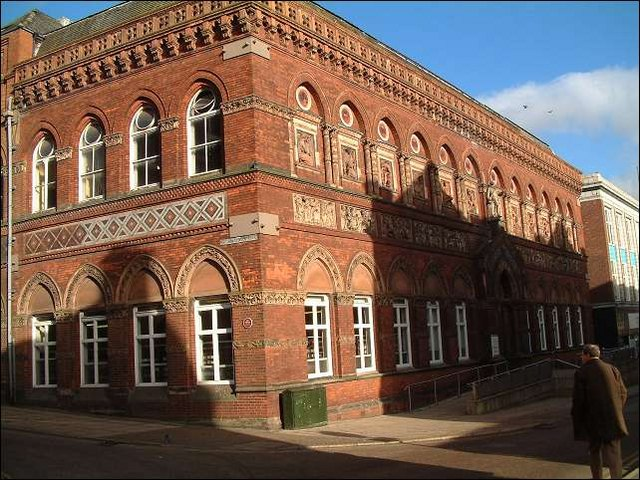
  Josiah Wedgwood Memorial Institute, Stoke-on-Trent
- c1865 Victoria Park, Mumbai (Bombay), India. Entrance gateway and clock-tower.
- 1865 Duke of Cornwall Hotel, Plymouth, Devon. Decorative terracotta work for the architect C Forster Hayward.
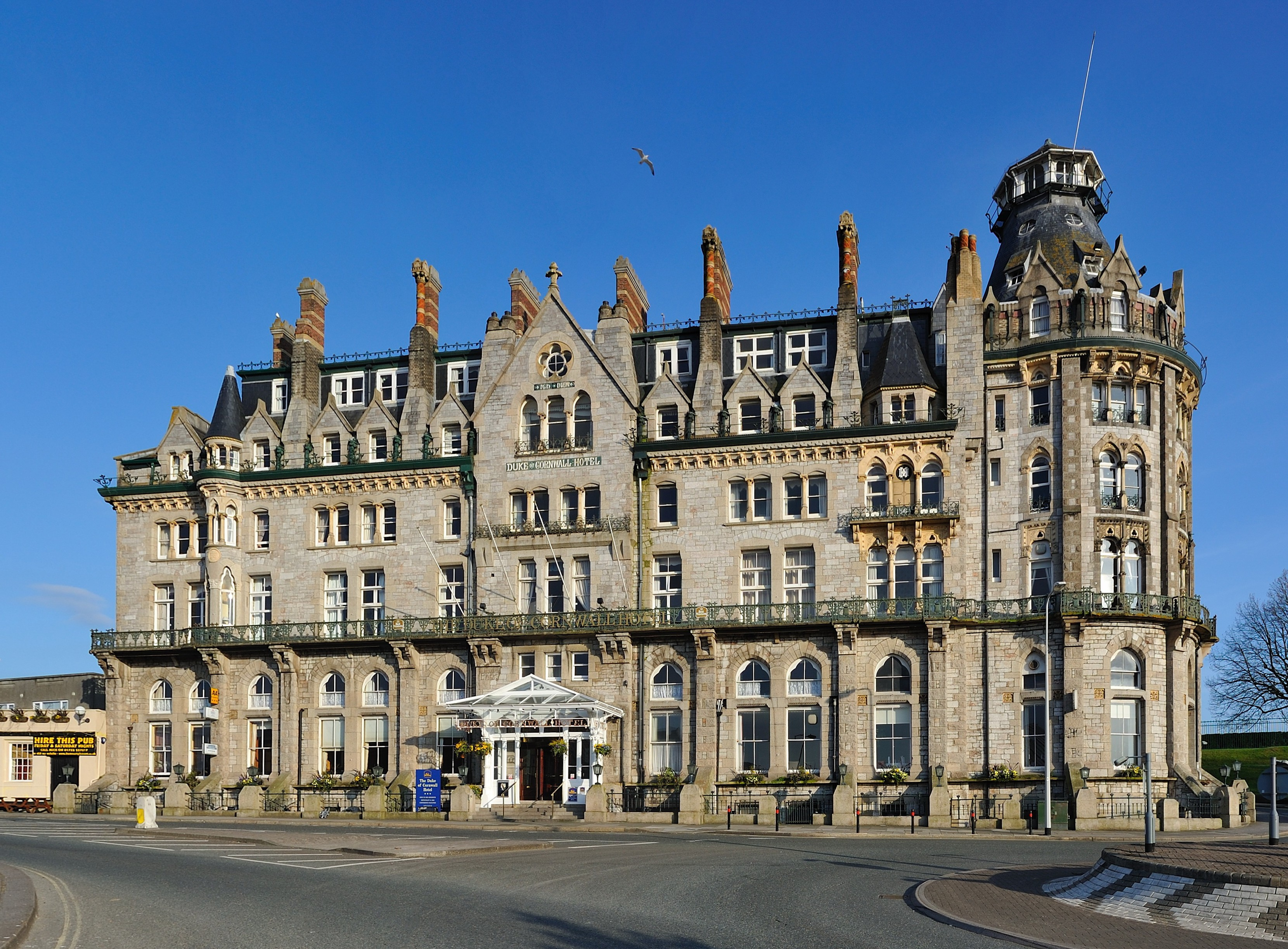
  Duke of Cornwall Hotel, Plymouth
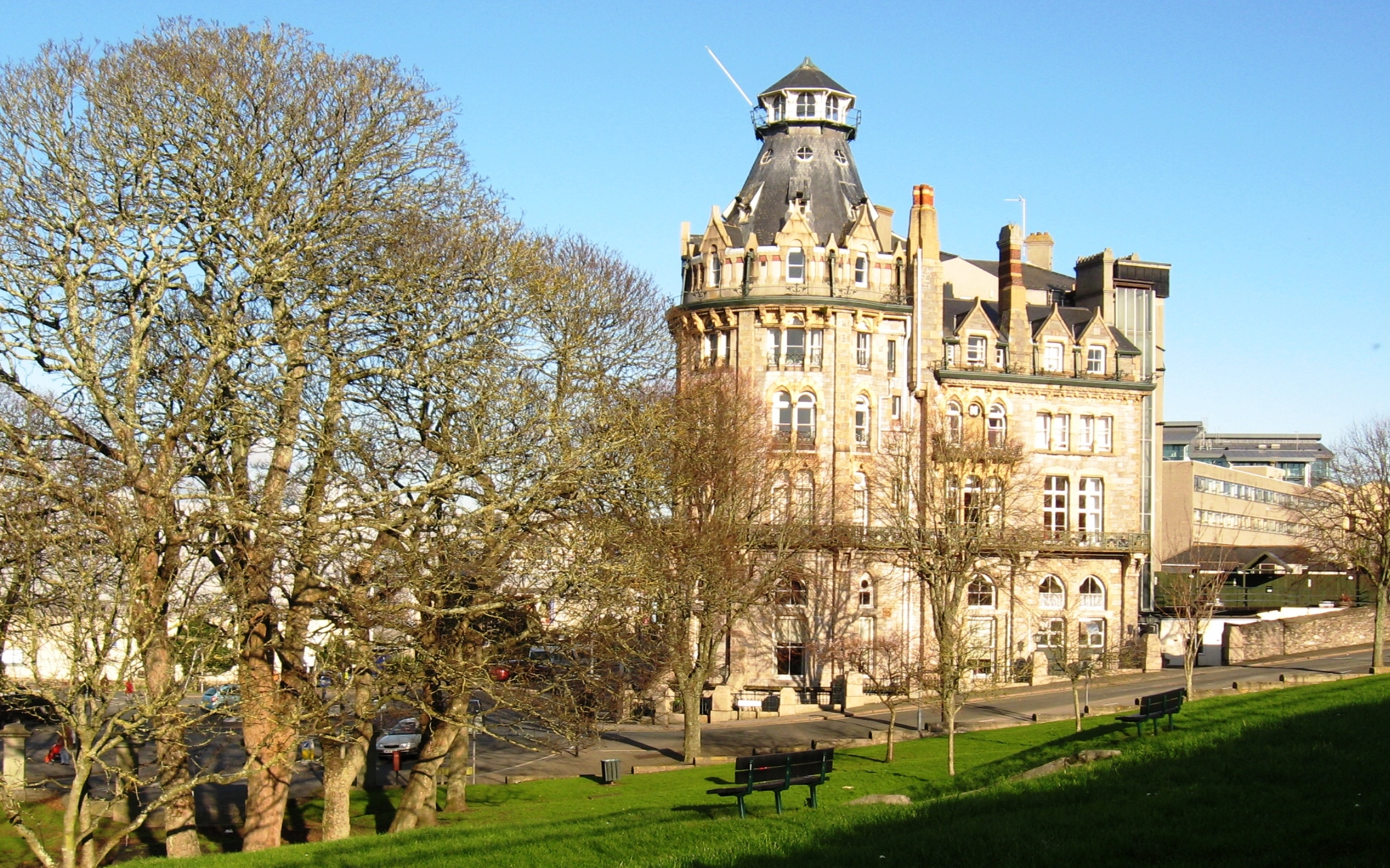
  Duke of Cornwall Hotel, Plymouth. Terracotta by Blashfield
  When threatened with demolition in 1977 the hotel was described by Sir John Betjeman as "one of the finest examples of Victorian gothic architecture he had ever seen", and in 1988 its future was secured.
- 1866 Farnham Town Hall, Decorative ornaments.
- 1866-7 Dulwich College, London. Decorative ornaments designed by Charles Barry Jnr.
- 1867-8 Terrace gardens, Castle Ashby Park, Castle Ashby – South Northamptonshire. Terraced gardens, to north and east of Castle Ashby House. Designed by Matthew Digby Wyatt with decorated Blashfield terracotta. Fountains, pedestals, balustrades and gate piers
- 1868-9 Parapets and decorative panels for Sturgis at Pinebank, Boston, Mass.
- 1871. Scotgate Inn, 5 Scotgate, Stamford. Built for Phipps Brewery of Northampton as a store for wines and spirits. Terracotta rustication and window surrounds, with a parapet inscribed with the name of the brewery. The parapet is surmounted with the arms of Northampton. Now offices.
- 1875 Replacement of terracotta window mullions and two new windows at Sutton Place, Surrey.
- 1870-6 Museum of Fine Arts, Boston by Sturgis and Brigham

=== Undated work ===
- Alford House, Somerset. Decorative ornaments.
- Sun Fire Insurance Office, Charing Cross, London.
- Royal Mausoleum, Frogmore, Windsor. Urns and possibly the balustrades to the staircase.
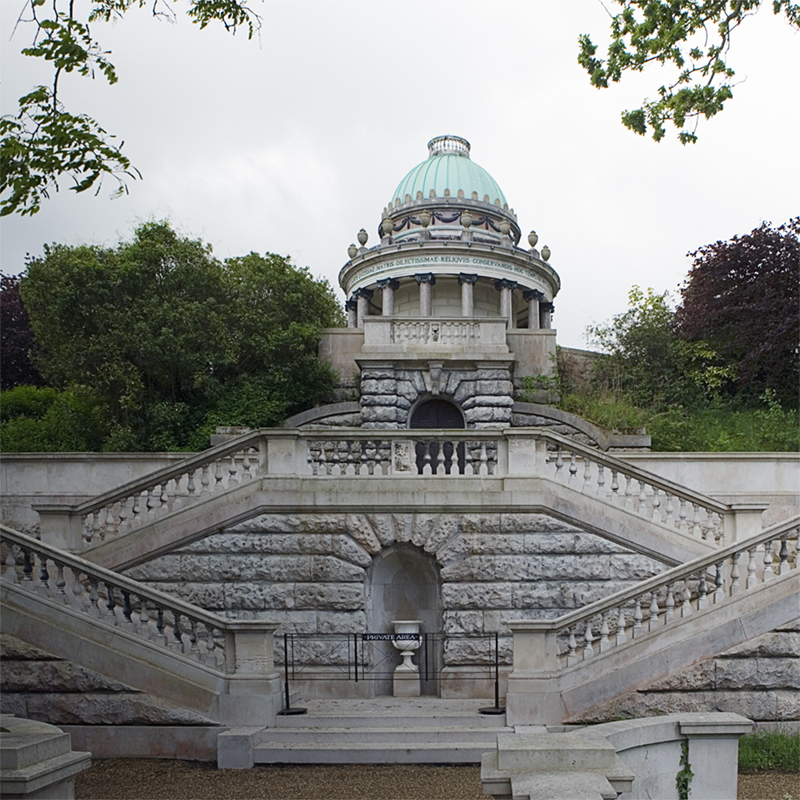
  The Duchess of Kent's mausoleum at Frogmore with urns and balustrades, presumably by Blashfield
- Buckingham Palace, London. Vases.
- Kew Palace, Surrey. Vases.
- Hampton Court Palace.
- Stoke Rochford Hall, Lincolnshire. Diana and a Stag. Probably urns and other ornamentation on Orangery.
- Stokesay Court, Shropshire. Pair of Warwick Vases.
- Ragley Hall, Warwickshire. Pair of classical urns.
- Aldermaston Churchyard, Berkshire. Pair of Pineapplle finials.
- English Church, Bagni di Lucca, Tuscany, Italy. Royal arms and frieze of roses, shamrocks and thistles. Thermal springs patronised by Byron, Browning and other English tourists. In 1839 permission was granted to build a Protestant church, and Giuseppe Pardini built a church which resembles a palace rather than a church. The three-storey building is extensively decorated with reddish terracotta friezes and a prominent ‘gothic’ portico. The building is now used as a library.
- Dodington Park, Gloucestershire. Terrace and Urns
- Roman Catholic Church of St Mary and St Augustine, Stamford. Terracotta altar rails removed in 1982.
- 30 High Street, Stamford.
- Burghley House, Stamford. Urns in South Garden

== Literature ==
- Birch N. Stamford: An Industrial History (1972), Lincolnshire Industrial Archaeology Group.
- R. Gunnis Dictionary of British Sculptors, 1660–1851, 1953.
- R. Gunnis Dictionary of British Sculptors, 1660–1851, revised ed., 1968
- Haskell, Francis, and Penny, Nicholas, Taste and the Antique; The Lure of Classical Sculpture 1500–1900 Yale University Press, New Haven and London: 1981.
- Ingrid Roscoe, Emma Hardy & M G Sullivan A Biographical Dictionary of Sculptors in Britain 1660–1851.
- The Royal Commission on Historical Monuments of England Inventory of Historical Monuments in the Town of Stamford, HMSO, 1977.
- F. H. W. Sheppard (Editor) 'The Crown estate in Kensington Palace Gardens: Individual buildings', Survey of London: Northern Kensington (1973), volume 37pp. 162–193.
- Michael Stratton, The Terracotta Revival: Building Innovation and the Image of the Industrial City in Britain and North America, Gollanz, London. 1993.
