= Olmsted Park =

Park in Massachusetts, United States

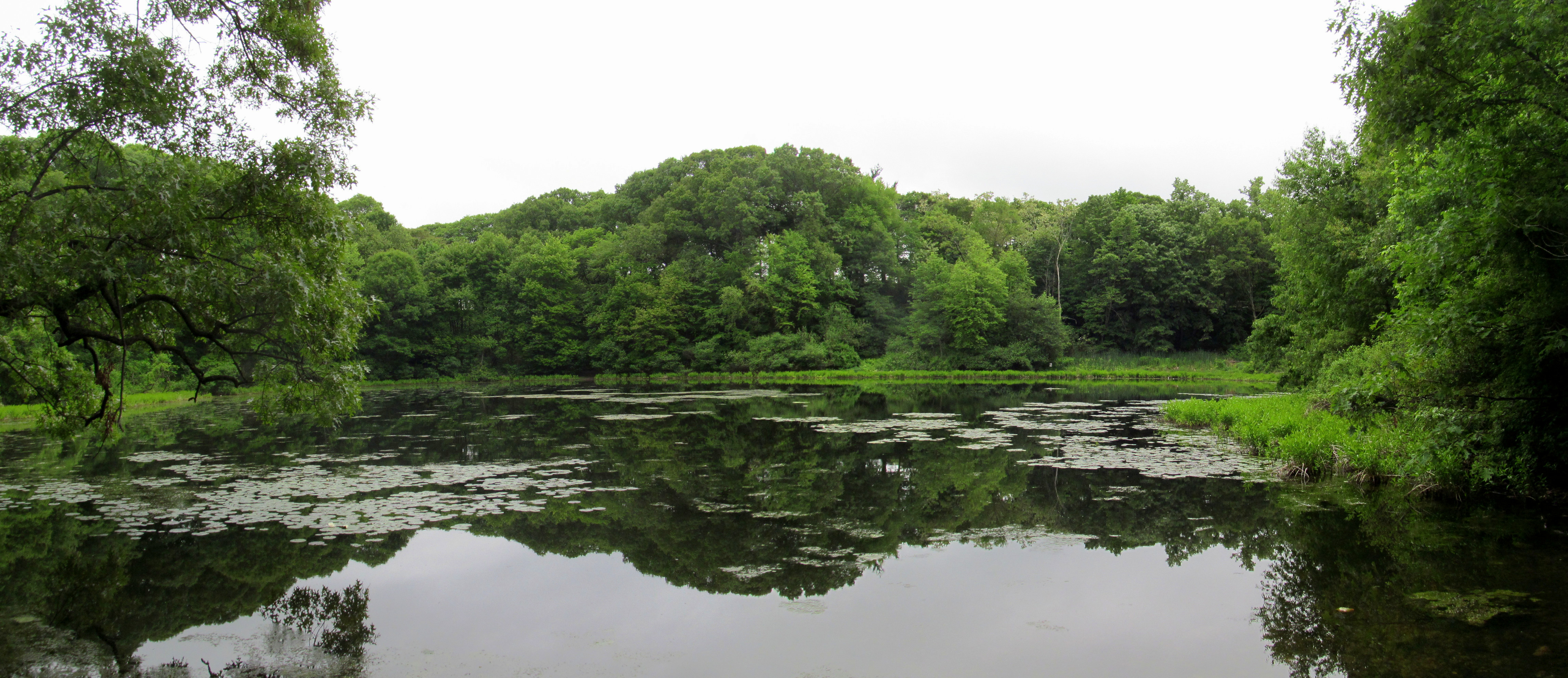
- Ward's Pond in Olmsted Park in 2014
- Interactive map of Olmsted Park
- Location: Boston and Brookline, Massachusetts
- Coordinates: 42.3259°N 71.1149°W
- Designer: Frederick Law Olmsted
- Olmstead Park System
- U.S. National Register of Historic Places
- NRHP reference No.: 71000086

Olmsted Park is a linear park in Boston and Brookline, Massachusetts, and a part of Boston's Emerald Necklace of connected parks and parkways. Originally named Leverett Park, in 1900 it was renamed to honor its designer, Frederick Law Olmsted.

Olmsted Park can be roughly divided into two parts. In the south, bordering Jamaica Pond, it includes athletic fields and three ponds: from the south, a small kettle pond called Ward's Pond, the tiny Willow Pond, and the much larger Leverett Pond. The northern section of the park, above Route 9, is a narrow corridor through which the Muddy River flows on its way to the Charles River. The northern edge of Olmsted Park connects to the Back Bay Fens and the western edge of the Mission Hill neighborhood.

== History ==
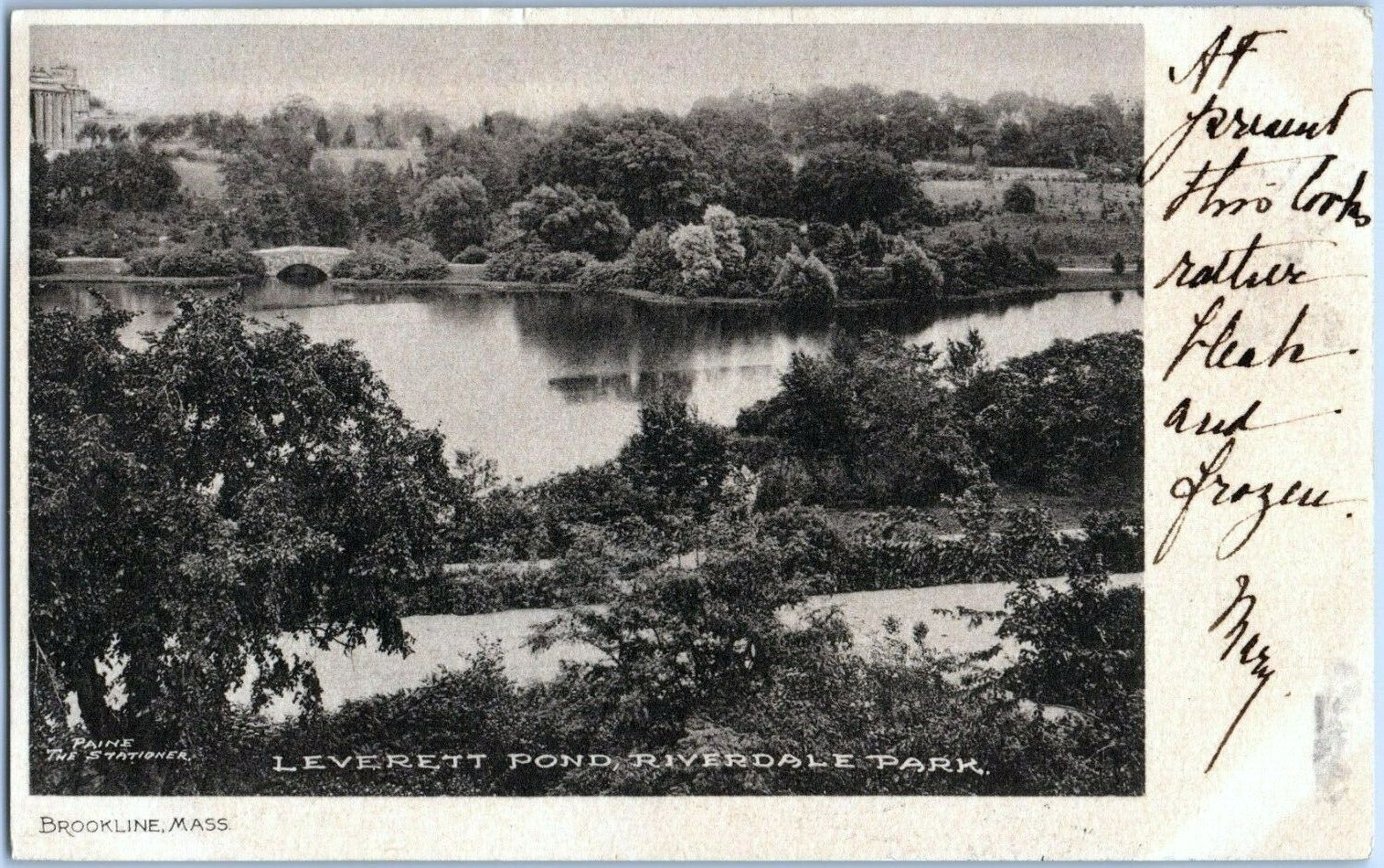
Leverett Pond in 1905

Olmsted, who had made a reputation designing New York City's Central Park, suggested in 1880 that the swampy and brackish Muddy River be included in Boston's park plan. Beginning in 1890, the river was dredged into a winding stream, a large swamp converted into Leverett's Pond, and Ward's Pond was connected with a small outflowing stream.

Following completion of the Emerald Necklace Parks Master Plan in 1989 (updated in 2001), a number of improvements have been made in Olmsted Park. Riverdale Parkway, originally designed as a carriage road, was transformed into a bicycle and pedestrian path in 1997–98. The Allerton Overlook at the foot of Allerton Street in Brookline was recreated, footbridges re-pointed, and a boardwalk placed at the south end of Ward's Pond.

In 2006, Brookline restored Olmsted's "Babbling Brook" (a section of the Muddy River in the park), resetting stones, clearing out invasive knotweed, defining the streambed, and replanting trees and shrubs to inhibit future invasives growth.
