= Vaynor Park =

Vaynor Park, Vaynor, Berriew
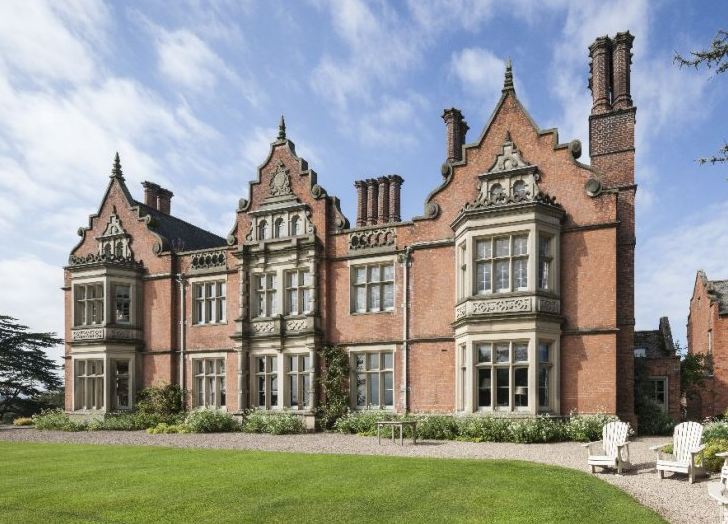
- Vaynor, Berriew

- Location within Powys
- 52.5933°N 3.2158°W

History
- Built: mid-15th Century
- Rebuilt: c1640

Site notes
- Architect: Thomas Penson
- Architectural style: Jacobean
- Restored: 1840–1853

Listed Building – Grade II*
- Official name: Cadw Building ID: 7689
- Designated: 26 October 1953

Vaynor Park is a country house in a landscaped park, standing on high ground to the south-west of Berriew village, in the historic county of Montgomeryshire, now Powys. The origins of the house date from the mid-15th century, but the house was extensively re-built in brick about 1640 in the Jacobean style. The house was further re-modelled in 1840–1853 by Thomas Penson. The house is listed Grade II* and the garden and park is on the Cadw/ICOMOS Register of Parks and Gardens of Special Historic Interest in Wales.

== Early ownership ==
The substantial medieval house built for Edward ap Hywel ab leuan Llwyd is described by the poet Guto'r Glyn (c.1412 – c.1493) in the C15.

== 17th-century rebuilding ==
In the 1570s the house was purchased by Arthur Price, a son of Mathew Price of Newtown Hall. Arthur Price was the Member of Parliament for Montgomery Boroughs from 1571 to 1572. The house then passed down his granddaughter Bridget, who in 1633 had married George Devereux.

George Devereux was the son of Sir George Devereux of Sheldon Hall, Warwickshire and the nephew of Walter Devereux, Viscount Hereford. He played a leading part in Montgomeryshire politics and was a ‘recruiter’ M.P. for Montgomery in the Long Parliament (6 April 1647). He was suspended as a ‘delinquent’ the following May, but signed the Montgomeryshire declaration for Parliament on 20 May 1648. After the king's execution he remained in retirement till he began to sit on county committees in 1657 and accepted office as sheriff in 1658. Haslam attributes the building of the brick house shown in John Ingleby's watercolours to him around 1640, but it could also be from after the Civil War.

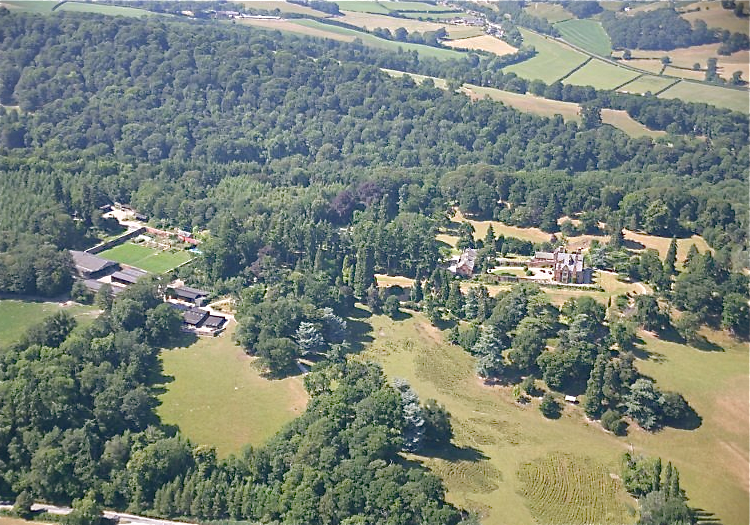
Vaynor Park, Berriew from the air with walled garden to west

Vaynor is one of only four big brick houses of its date in the county and is built in Flemish bond. John Ingleby's drawings show the back of the house with two storeys of eight bays beneath four equal gables. The west front, facing over a courtyard, had a five-bay centre flanked by hip-roofed wings two bays wide by one deep: this all looks like a re-working of c.1670. External chimneys on the side walls can be compared with Llandrinio Hall of 1682.

After Sir George's death in 1682 (or possibly 1665), the house passed to his grandson Price Devereux (1664–1740), whose father had died young. Price was M.P. for Montgomery Boroughs until becoming the 9th Viscount Hereford in 1700. Following the death in 1748 of his son, the 10th Viscount, the Hereford viscountcy passed to a branch of the family in Nantcribba near Montgomery but the Vaynor property was bequeathed as part of the residual estate to his executor and lawyer Robert Moxon. In 1793 Robert Moxon's nephew left the house and estate to his sister Ann and her husband John Winder. Their son, Capt John Winder, having married in 1781, took possession in 1794 with his wife Anna Charlotte Christiana Knowles. She was the daughter of Admiral Sir Charles Knowles 1st Baronet. They had one daughter only who died during childbirth. John's wife was left the estate for her lifetime when he died in 1820. Her nephew Admiral Sir Charles Knowles, 4th Baronet was born at Vaynor on 14 March 1832. She is known to have lived "in great State" there, having been a great favourite and Maid of Honour to Catherine the Great of Russia. She had been at St Petersburg with her father when he went on loan to Catherine in order to rebuild the Russian Fleet. On her death in 1839 the estate passed to her husband's sister's descendants, since when it has descended in the Corbett-Winder family to the present owners.

The house is a Grade II* listed building and its garden and park is also listed, at Grade I, on the Cadw/ICOMOS Register of Parks and Gardens of Special Historic Interest in Wales.

=== John Ingleby's views of Vaynor 1796 ===
Thomas Pennant's From Downing to Montgomery and Shrewsbury in July 1776. pg. 380
On the left is the house of Vaynor, once the property of the Prices; but, by marriage of the heiress, in the last century, to George Devereux, Esq; was transferred to the Viscounts Hereford. But on the death of Price Devereux, tenth of that honor, was, by will, alienated to persons foreign to the name and blood.

— A Tour in Wales. Bridge Books reprint, Wrexham, Vol 2, 357–437 (pg.380)
1990

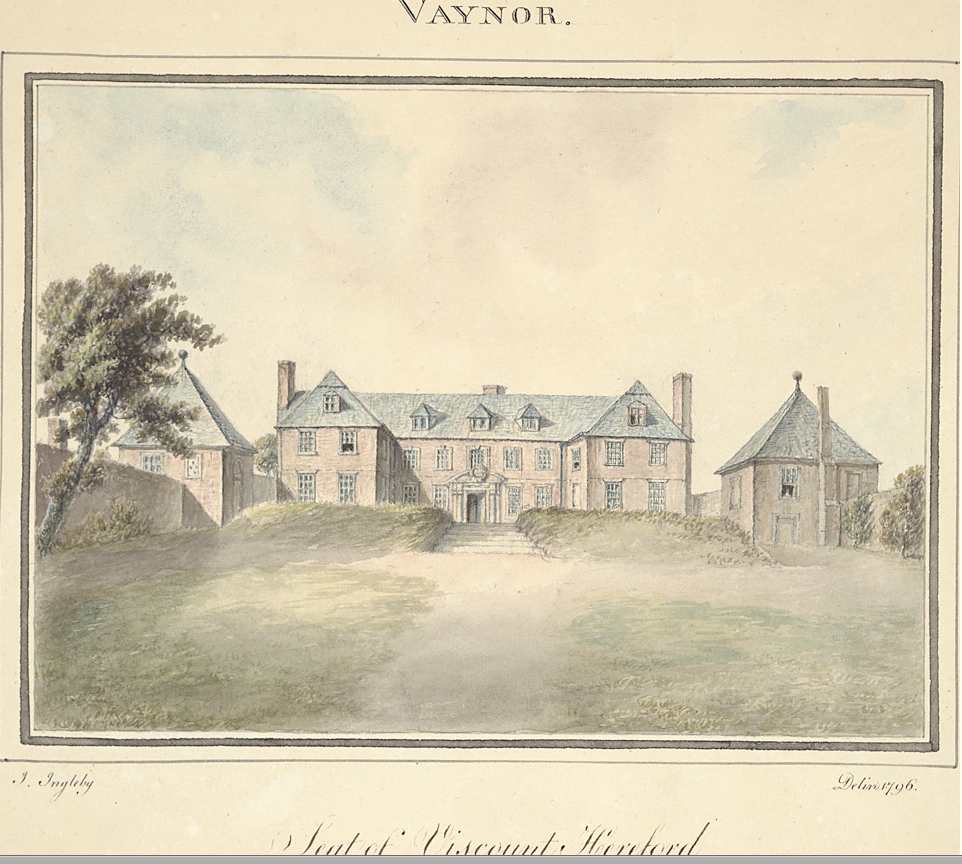
John Ingleby, watercolour of west front of the house and entrance court 1796. The National Library of Wales (PD 9205).

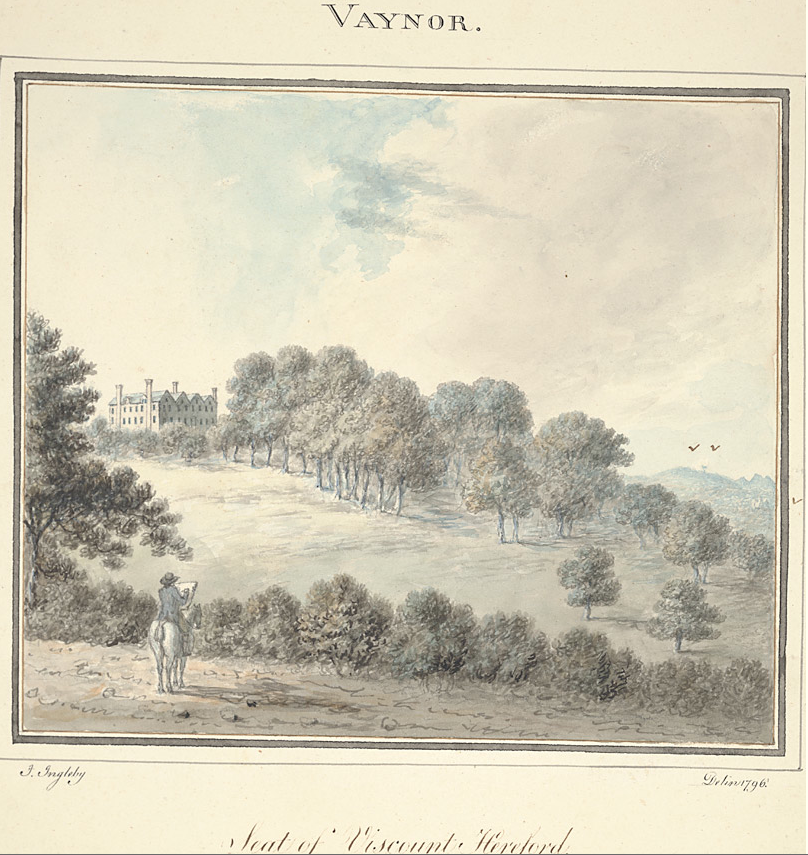
John Ingleby, watercolour of view across park to south-east (PD 9204). The National Library of Wales.

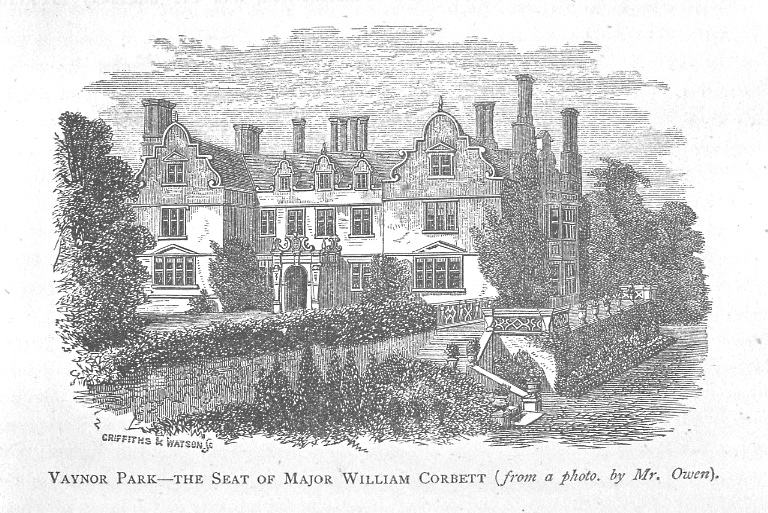
Sktech of Vaynor Berriew

In 1776 Thomas Pennant stayed with his friend Arthur Blayney at nearby Gregynog while making a tour through Montgomeryshire. When this Tour was included in the second edition of ‘‘Tour in Wales’‘ which was published in 1783, he only included a short description of Vaynor. He intended to revise the Montgomeryshire tour, and, as it was un-illustrated, he commissioned the artist in John Ingleby in 1794–6 to produce a series of watercolours of Montgomeryshire houses and churches. These watercolours are now in the National Library of Wales and included two watercolours of Vaynor. In one of these, Ingleby shows himself on horseback sketching Vaynor. Ingleby's watercolour shows the S W aspect of the house which now looks onto a rectangular court yard at the opposite end of which is a long stable block. The two forward wings of the house remain but the buildings to each side have been removed.

== Rebuilding by Thomas Penson 1840–53 ==
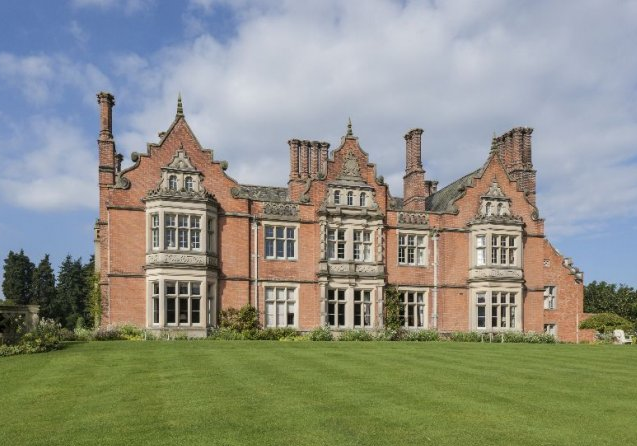
Vaynor Park, Berriew

In the early 19th the Winder family had various schemes for rebuilding Vaynor. Plans exist of c1810 by Thomas Hopper for a Gothic extravaganza and a further scheme was submitted by Peter Frederick Robinson about 1820. However, in the mid-1830s John Lyon Winder opted for a more modest scheme by Thomas Penson the Montgomeryshire County Surveyor which preserved a greater portion of the interiors of the house. The style chosen was Jacobean, a reflection of taste changing from the austere medieval of earlier in the century towards more opulent decoration. So on the West, transom-and-mullion windows were inserted (replacing Georgian sashes) and given pediments, big shaped gables were substituted, and a carved porch with pilasters and a strapwork crest was added, to give an E plan. The chimneys were rebuilt with the tall brick shafts that were to characterize many of the estate houses and farms. Shaped gables to the E side, the outer bays with strapwork-crested bay-windows. Penson's remodeling is of convincing quality, and is particularly dramatic when viewed from below the terrace to the S. Inside, the plan was reordered by Penson, but most of the fittings are those of the late C17, which is a tribute to him. In the hall a C17 carved overmantel from Crutched Friars. The library, whose l. part held the staircase, has a plaster ceiling and lovely woodwork to Penson's designs, excepting a mid-C17 overmantel, which has carved figures. In the drawing and dining rooms, ceilings by Penson (the latter based on that in the long gallery at Hardwick Hall), and in the latter a fireplace carved by Henry Street incorporating C17 pieces. The fine staircase, dog-leg, with its fluted pear-shaped balusters and bold bolection panelling, was reassembled – which might account for some crude details in the broken triangular pediments over the doorcases. In the study, late C17 bolection paneling. The house stands at the E of a courtyard which had two-storey pavilions halfway down the side walls. The long C17 gatehouse and stables have scrolled gables which were lowered by Penson, who added three gables facing the house. The florid Elizabethan frontispiece on the outer side came last and was added by Samuel Pountney Smith of Shrewsbury, 1853.

== Literature ==
- Alfrey J (2001), Rural Building in Nineteenth- Century North Wales: The Role of the Great Estate, Archaeologia Cambrensis. Vol 147, 1998, 199–216.
- Cadw (1999) Register of Landscapes, Parks and Gardens of Special Historic Interest in Wales: Powys. Cardiff ISBN 1 85760 196 3
- Richard Haslam, A Note on the Architecture of Vaynor Park, Montgomeryshire Collections, Vol. 65, 1977.
- Pinhorn M., Vaynor, Berriew, Montgomeryshire, Montgomeryshire Collections, 65, 1977 esp. pp 35–37
- Scourfield R and Haslam R, (2013) Buildings of Wales: Powys; Montgomeryshire, Radnorshire and Breconshire, 2nd edition, Yale University Press, p. 84.
- Silvester, R. (2012) Mapping Montgomeryshire: Estate Maps from 1589 t0 1840, Montgomeryshire Collections, Vol. 100, pp 149–180
- Silvester, R. and Alfrey, J. Vaynor: a landscape and its buildings in the Severn Valley, in Estate Landscapes : Design, Improvement and Power in the Post-Medieval Landscape (Ed. Finch J and Giles K) Boydell press, Woodbridge 2008. ISBN 978-1-84383-370-3
- Peter Smith,(1988) Houses of the Welsh Countryside, Royal Commission on the Ancient and Historical Monuments of Wales, 2nd edition, .

== See also ==
- Berriew
- Nantcribba
- Garthmyl Hall, Berriew
