= Berriew =

Berriew: Welsh: Aberriw
- Location within Powys
- Population: 1,334 (2011)
- OS grid reference: SJ187008
- Principal area: Powys
- Preserved county: Powys
- Country: Wales
- Sovereign state: United Kingdom
- Post town: MONTGOMERY
- Postcode district: SY15
- Post town: WELSHPOOL
- Postcode district: SY21
- Dialling code: 01686
- Police: Dyfed-Powys
- Fire: Mid and West Wales
- Ambulance: Welsh
- UK Parliament: Montgomeryshire and Glyndŵr
- Senedd Cymru – Welsh Parliament: Montgomeryshire
- List of places UK Wales Powys 52.59628°N 3.20263°W Community map: Map of the community

Berriew (Welsh: Aberriw) is a village and community in Montgomeryshire, Powys, Wales. It is on the Montgomeryshire Canal and the Afon Rhiw, near the confluence (Welsh: aber) with the River Severn (Welsh: Afon Hafren) at grid reference SJ185005, 79 miles (128 km) from Cardiff and 151 miles (243 km) from London. The village itself has a population of 283 and the community also includes Garthmyl Hall and Refail.

== Buildings and architecture ==
Berriew contains many architecturally important buildings. There are 103 Listed Buildings in Berriew, of which 5 are Grade II*. Nearly a quarter of the listed building are connected with the Montgomeryshire Canal which runs across the parish to the S.E. of Berriew. The most important of the listed buildings are Vaynor, which is probably the earliest brick built house of the mid-17th. century still standing in Montgomeryshire, and Glansevern, designed by the notable Shrewsbury architect Joseph Bromfield in the Greek Revival style and probably the best example of his work. There are two important timber-framed houses, the Vicarage which is dated 1616 and Lower Cil Farmhouse. An illustration of the Vicarage was used to illustrate the dustwrapper of the 1st edition of Peter Smith's important book on Welsh Vernacular Architecture ‘'Houses of The Welsh Countryside'’. Another notable house is Garthmyl Hall, Berriew, which is by a leading 19th century designer and architect James Kellaway Colling. There are also a number of other larger houses in Berriew which include Brithdir, a timber-framed house which was considerably extended in the early 19th century; Pennant, a fine early brick house built in 1755; Rhiewport, a Regency house that is also probably by Joseph Bromfield, and Trwstllwelyn, a house with much early 18th century brickwork.

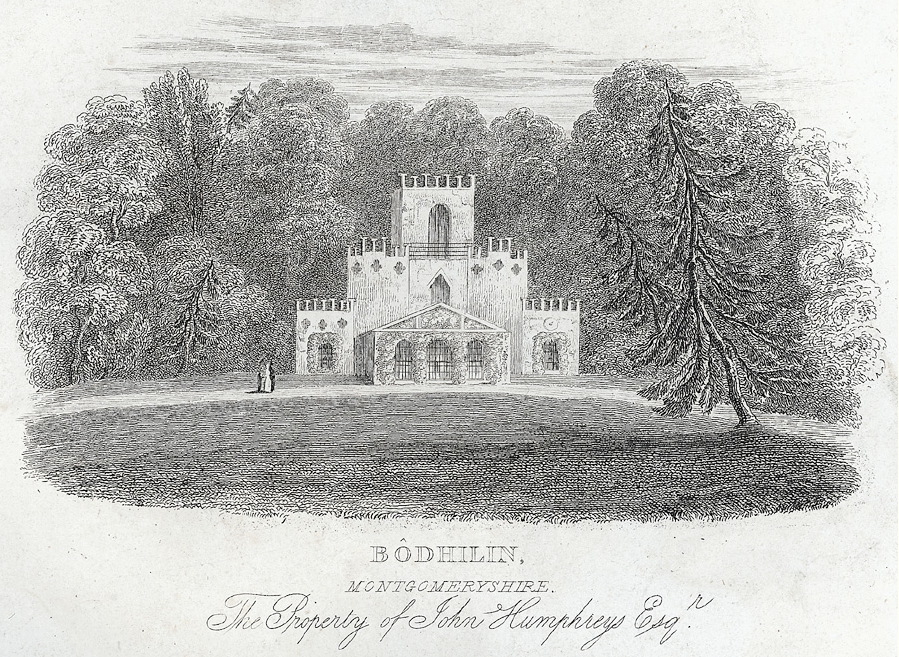
Bodhilin or Bodheilin, Brithdir, Berriew.

A sad loss was the fantasy Gothic villa of Bodheilin in Brithdir township, which was burnt down in 1906.

=== Timber framed and Cottage Ornée houses ===
Rather than the individual houses, Berriew is best remembered for its half timbered cottages which cluster around the churchyard and along the banks of the river Rhiew. There are further examples in the township of Refail. These can probably be attributed to the architect Thomas Penson. In the late 1830s, at the same time as Penson was working on remodelling Vaynor Park in Berriew for John Winder Lion-Winder, he was also remodelling and building houses in Berriew for the Vaynor estate. As a result of his work Berriew developed as a village with many attractive Cottage Ornée houses. Some of these were rebuilt from earlier timber framed buildings, while others were built in a Tudor Revival style and are some of the earliest examples of Black-and-white Revival architecture. Penson's work can be recognised by the massive brick chimney stacks which have been added to the houses, the ornamental bargeboards to the gables and in some cases the black and white painting on the brick work to give the impression of timber framing.

=== Listed Buildings in Berriew ===
- Vaynor Park is the main estate in Berriew, lying to the west of the village.
- Glansevern Hall and Gardens are adjacent to the village. Glansevern Hall was built between 1801 and 1807 for Sir Arthur Davies Owen, by Joseph Bromfield. The hall is a Grade II* listed building and its garden and park is listed, also at Grade II*, on the Cadw/ICOMOS Register of Parks and Gardens of Special Historic Interest in Wales.
- Garthmyl Hall is a Grade II listed house to the south of Berriew. Garthmyl Hall was completely rebuilt in 1859 by the architect James K Colling for Major-General William George Gold.
- The Vicarage, which is the residence of the Archdeacon of Montgomery. It is dated 1616 with the initials of the vicar, Thomas Kyffin. Vertical studding with diagonal braces, the upper floor jettied on a moulded bressumer. The porch with railed sides with quadrant decoration. In the late C18, the lobby-chimney was removed, and the vicarage was extended to the west with a brick range.
- Lower Cil A well-preserved 16th-century timber-framed farmhouse of Severn Valley Lobby Entrance type. The timbers have been dated by tree-ring dating to 1583 for its original construction.

=== Other features of note ===
The Berriew section of The Montgomery Canal has a number of important features including a restored lock and the Grade II listed aqueduct which carries the canal over the River Rhiw. It has four segmental arches and is the second-largest masonry structure on the canal. First opened in 1797, it was largely rebuilt in the 19th century and fully restored in the 20th century.

== Governance ==
Berriew Community Council represents the interests of the local community and has 11 elected or co-opted members.

Berriew was also a county ward, electing one county councillor to sit on Powys County Council. Following a boundary review, Berriew ward became Berriew and Castle Caereinion, after the Castle Caereinion community was added to it, effective from the 2022 local elections.

== Facilities ==
Berriew F.C. play in the Central Wales Football League Northern Division, the fourth level of the Welsh football league system.

Mirror-artist and sculptor Andrew Logan bought the village squash courts and converted the building into a sculpture museum.

There are two pubs in the village, The Talbot and the Lion Hotel. There is also The Horseshoes, a little way out of the village.

The Berriew Show is a major attraction for the village and is held every August Bank Holiday Saturday. Attracting locals and people from miles around, it is a showcase for horticulture, agriculture and local craft and has thriving dog, horse and sheep shows.

== Best kept village in Wales ==
Berriew won this now-discontinued competition many times, the first time in 1970.

== Notable people ==
- Saint Beuno (died ca.640), an abbot, confessor and saint - he is said to have been born at Berriew
- Thomas Jones (1756–1807), teacher of mathematics and Head Tutor at Trinity College, Cambridge
- Sir Charles Knowles, 4th Baronet (1832–1917), Royal Navy vice admiral, born at Vaynor Park
- Alex Carlile, Baron Carlile of Berriew (born 1948), former Liberal Democrat M.P. for Montgomeryshire, took his life peerage title from the village.
- Kathy Pearce (born 1963), a Welsh international lawn and indoor bowler.

== Literature ==
- Gibson, A. (1995). The Carreg Beuno prehistoric landscape, Berriew. Montgomeryshire Collections 83 (1995), pp. 41–58
- Silvester, R. J. (1997), Luggy Moat, Berriew : recording and conservation. Montgomeryshire Collections 85, pp. 1–12
- Smith, D.. W. (1992), Aberriw to Berriew : the story of a community. Berriew : D.W. Smith. 17p
- Smith, D. W. (1991) Berriew and Trinity : Thomas Jones (1756-1807) and his contemporaries. Montgomeryshire Collections Vol 79, pp. 121–34
- Smith, D. W. (1989), The Berriew enclosures : Brithdir and the intercommoning districts. Montgomeryshire Collections Vol. 77, pp. 81–105
- Smith, D. W. (1985), Berriew in Stuart times : 2. Paupers and yeomen, poverty and prosperity. Montgomeryshire Collections Vol. 73, pp. 8–29
- Smith, D. W. (1990), Berriew maps : some comments. Montgomeryshire Collections Vol. 78, p. 162-3
- Scourfield R. and Haslam R. (2013), The Buildings of Wales: Powys; Montgomeryshire, Radnorshire and Breconshire, Yale University Press.
- Thomas, D.R.( 1908) History of the Diocese of Saint Asaph, Vol 1, 128–135.
