= Garthmyl Hall, Berriew =

Garthmyl Hall, Berriew, Powys
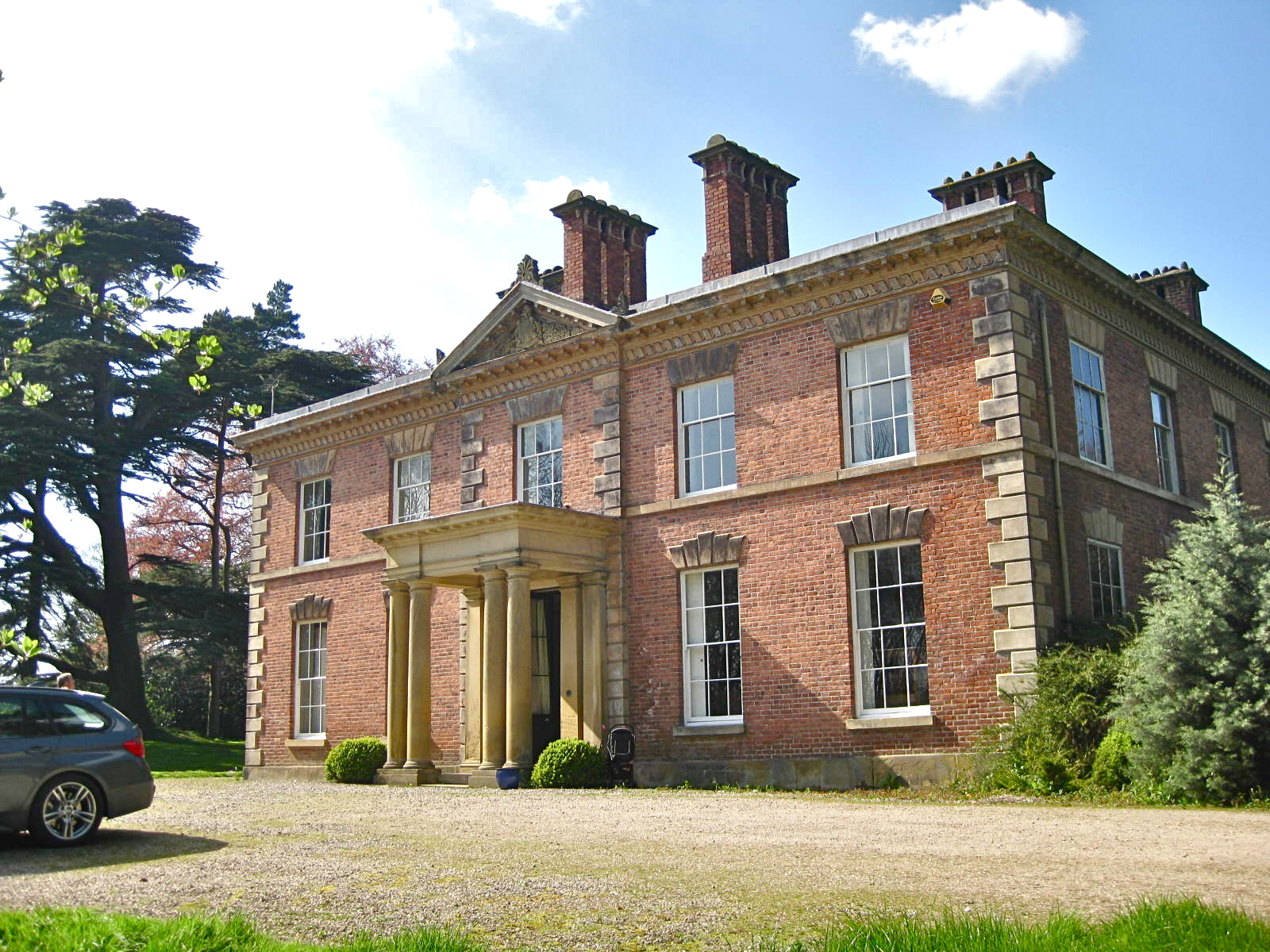
- Garthmyl Hall is a Grade II listed house in Berriew historic county of Montgomeryshire

- Location in Powys

General information
- Location: Powys, Wales, UK
- Coordinates: 52.489732°N 3.241541°W
- OS grid: SO319088298935

Garthmyl Hall is a Grade II listed house in Berriew, in the historic county of Montgomeryshire, now Powys. The house stood close to the site of a large 17th-century large timber-framed house. Garthmyl Hall was rebuilt in 1859 by the architect James K Colling for Major-General William George Gold.

== Setting ==
Garthmyl Hall is to the south of Berriew, overlooking the Severn valley and set back from the A 483 Welshpool to Newtown Road. It is immediately southwest of the junction with the B 4385 and set in a small park, which covers about 15 acres. The house is surrounded by woodland on ground that slopes to the south.

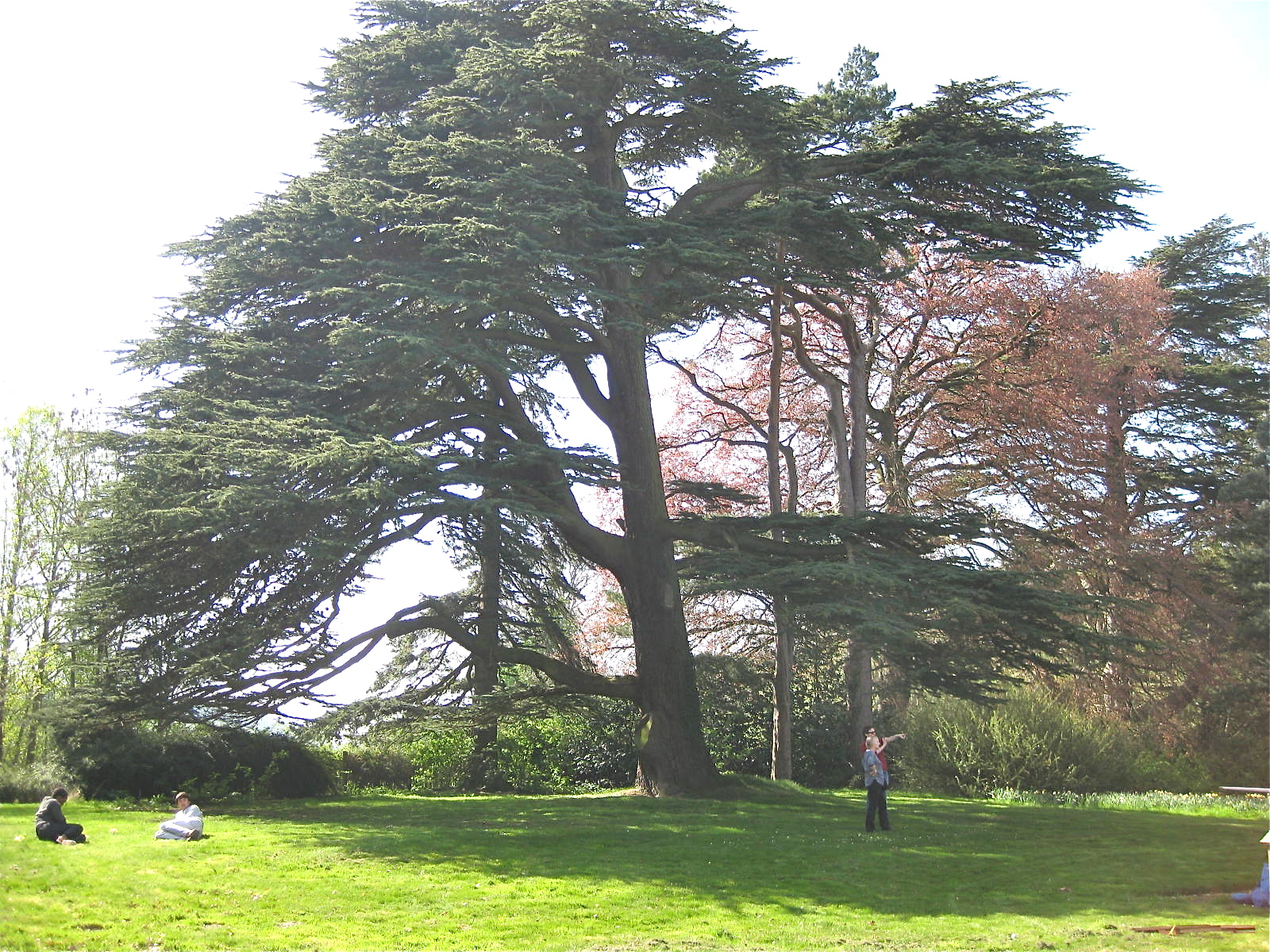
Garthmyl Hall. Cedar in grounds

The parkland is registered as Grade II in the Cadw Register of Parks and Gardens of Special Historic Interest in Wales where it is described as a "Good example of a classical gentry house with well preserved grounds developed in the mid nineteenth century in a fine setting. The garden contains a magnificent mature cedar of Lebanon." To the north of the house is a large walled garden, and to the east are stable buildings.

== History ==
The original house, was known as Garthmyl House and was sited to the east of the present house and a print (probably copied from a drawing) shows a large timbered framed mansion The house had been the ancestral home of the Jones family. This house is likely to have been built by John Reynolds (a cousin to the Jones Family), who died in 1672. Following a fire in the mid-eighteenth century, part of the house remained until at least 1825 when it was recorded on an estate map. The old house had been demolished by the time of the subsequent tithe map of 1840 and a new house may have been built on the site of the present Garthmyl Hall In 1859 Garthmyl was purchased by John Naylor of Leighton Hall for his sister Elizabeth Mary, who had married William George Gold (1800–83) in 1832. At the time of their marriage Gold had been a captain in the 59th Regiment of Foot (later the Shropshire Regiment) and by 1859 had risen to become a major-general. In 1864 he was to become the Sheriff of Montgomeryshire. Many sources say that an earlier house was re-modelled for their occupation but there does not appear to be any surviving evidence for this and the present Garthmyl Hall must represent a completely new building. Following the death of Major General Gold's widow, the ownership of Garthmyl Hall passed to John Naylor, who in 1884 describes himself as of Leighton and Garthmyl Halls. It was then purchased by Mrs Harriet Humphreys, and it continued in the ownership of the Humphrys and Churchill family until 1985.
The hall was bought in October 2015 by the Pugh family, renovated extensively, and opened in April 2016 as a wedding venue. The hall is also used for country house breaks and other events.

== Architectural description ==
The architect for Garthmyl Hall was James K. Colling, well known for his pattern books for Victorian architectural designs, but little known for his architectural work. He was responsible for the Albany Building in Liverpool. This was a speculative venture for John Naylor's brother Richard.

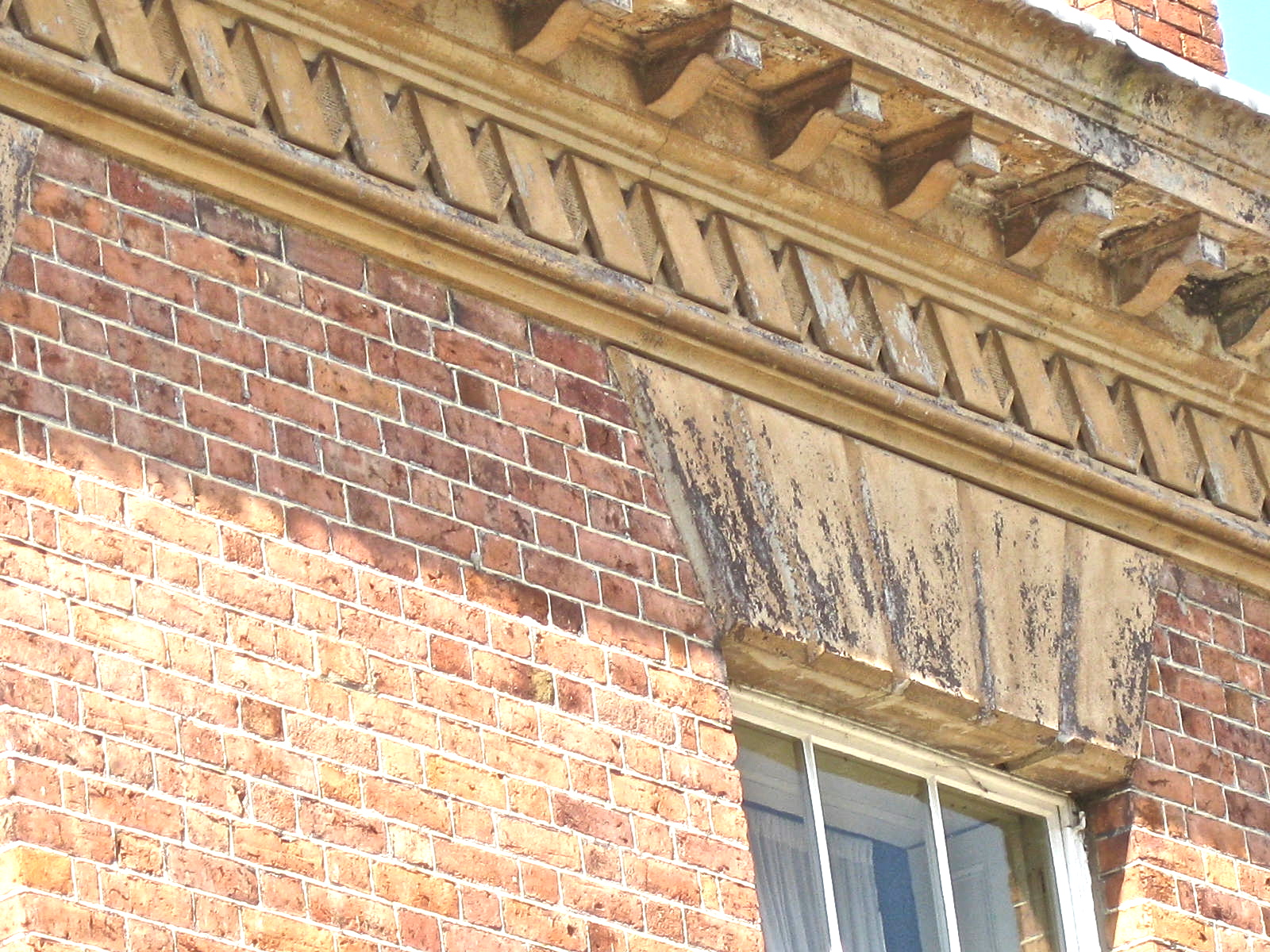
Garthmyl Hall. Terracotta frieze and consoles below eves

He also built the Castellated Gothic Ashwicke Hall in Gloucestershire for the Liverpool attorney John Orred 1857–60 Colling was given a free hand by the wealthy John Naylor when building Garthmyl Hall, as seen by the use of lavish gilding and plasterwork for ceiling decoration, and for the ornamental terracotta on the exterior. This was an opportunity for him to put into practice some of the designs illustrated in his books.

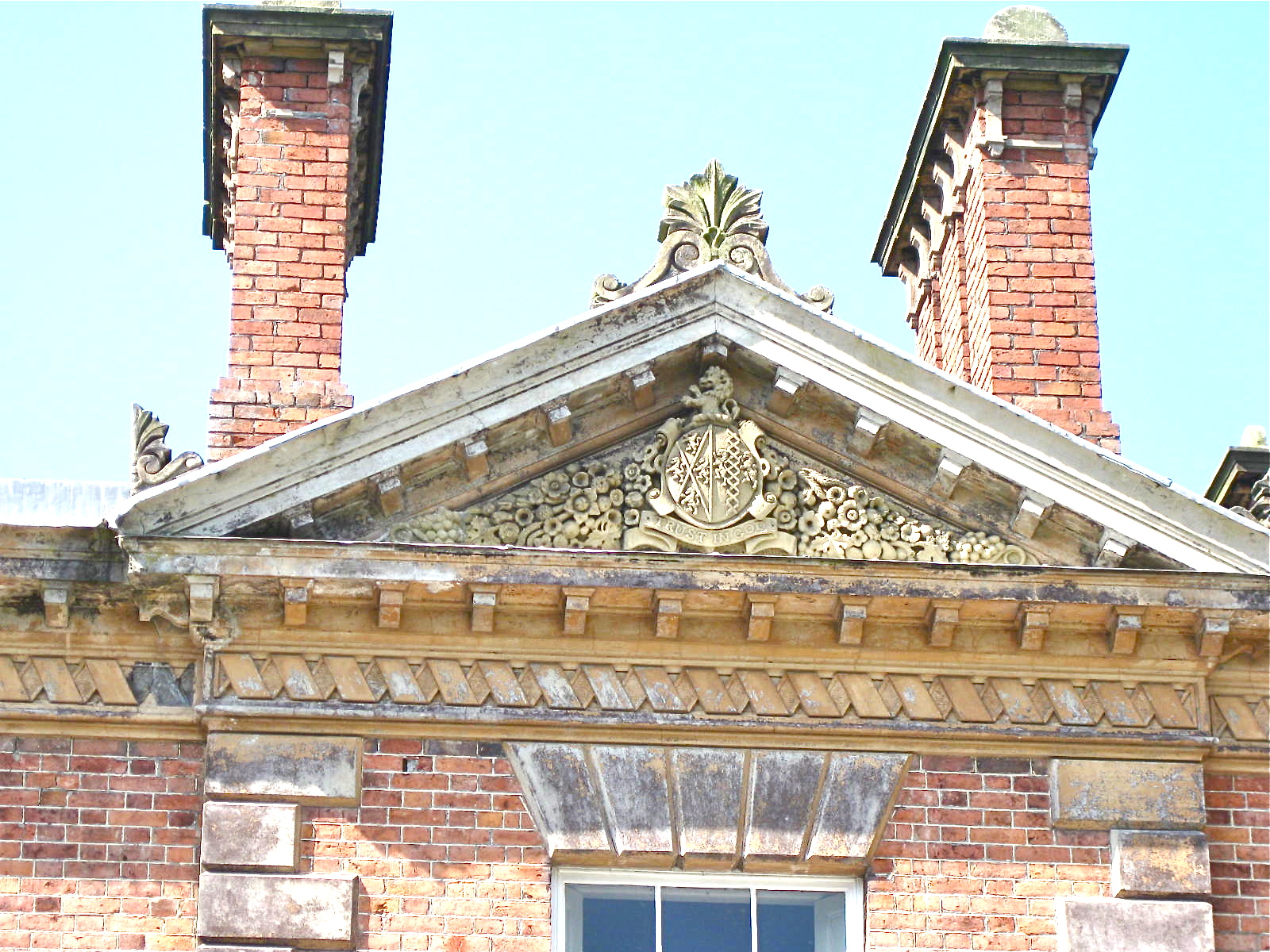
Garthmyl Hall with the Gold/Naylor Coat of Arms in terracotta set in the pediment

Garthmyl Hall is a two-storey, square, red brick house, five bays wide and six bays deep. It is executed in a sophisticated classical style with some Italianate and Grecian elements. Stone and terracotta dressings ornament the southeast front. Colling is likely to have patronised John Marriott Blashfield's Stamford Terracotta Company for the supply of the terracotta mouldings. The centre bay projects slightly, emphasised on the ground floor with a four-column Tuscan porch, and above by a pediment that is set with a terracotta coat of arms of the Gold and Naylor families with the motto Trust in God. The deep undercutting of the foliage and roses surrounding the coat of arms is typical of Blashfield's work. Below the eaves runs a terracotta scroll frieze that is similar to the frieze used by Colling on the Albany building. The hipped slate roof is set with large brick axial chimney stacks with stone caps.

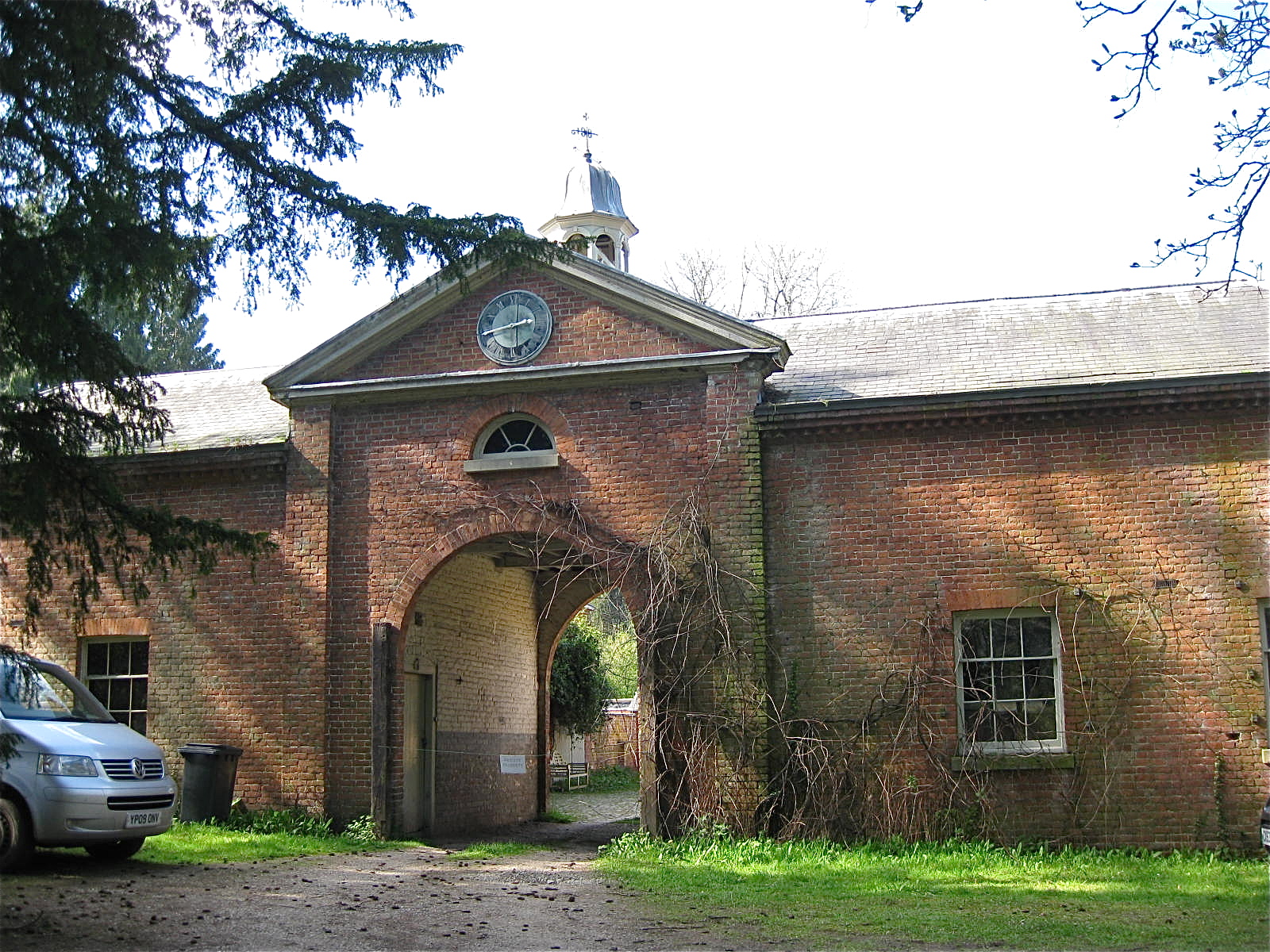
Garthmyl Hall Stable block

The brick Stable block, which has an entrance range with a central pediment over a lunette and surmounted by a cupola, is likely to be earlier than the main house.

The room inside to the right of the entrance has a decorative, almost Tudoresque, painted ceiling and a marble fireplace. The hall has an Ionic screen between the hall and the rising staircase around a stairwell. The staircase has iron lattice-work supports for the rail. Two large rooms on the left of the entrance have elaborately moulded and gilt decorated ceilings.

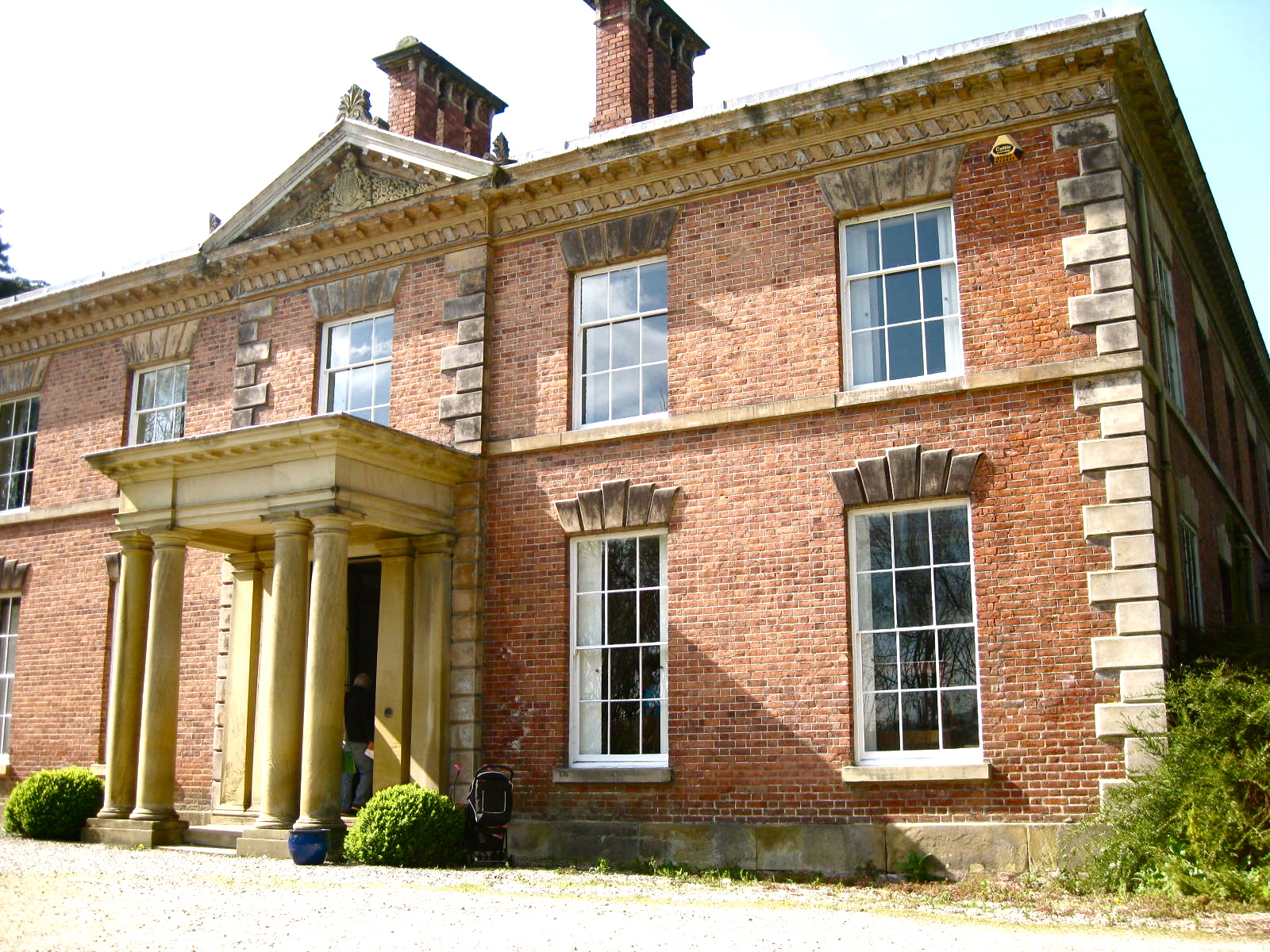
Garthmyl Hall

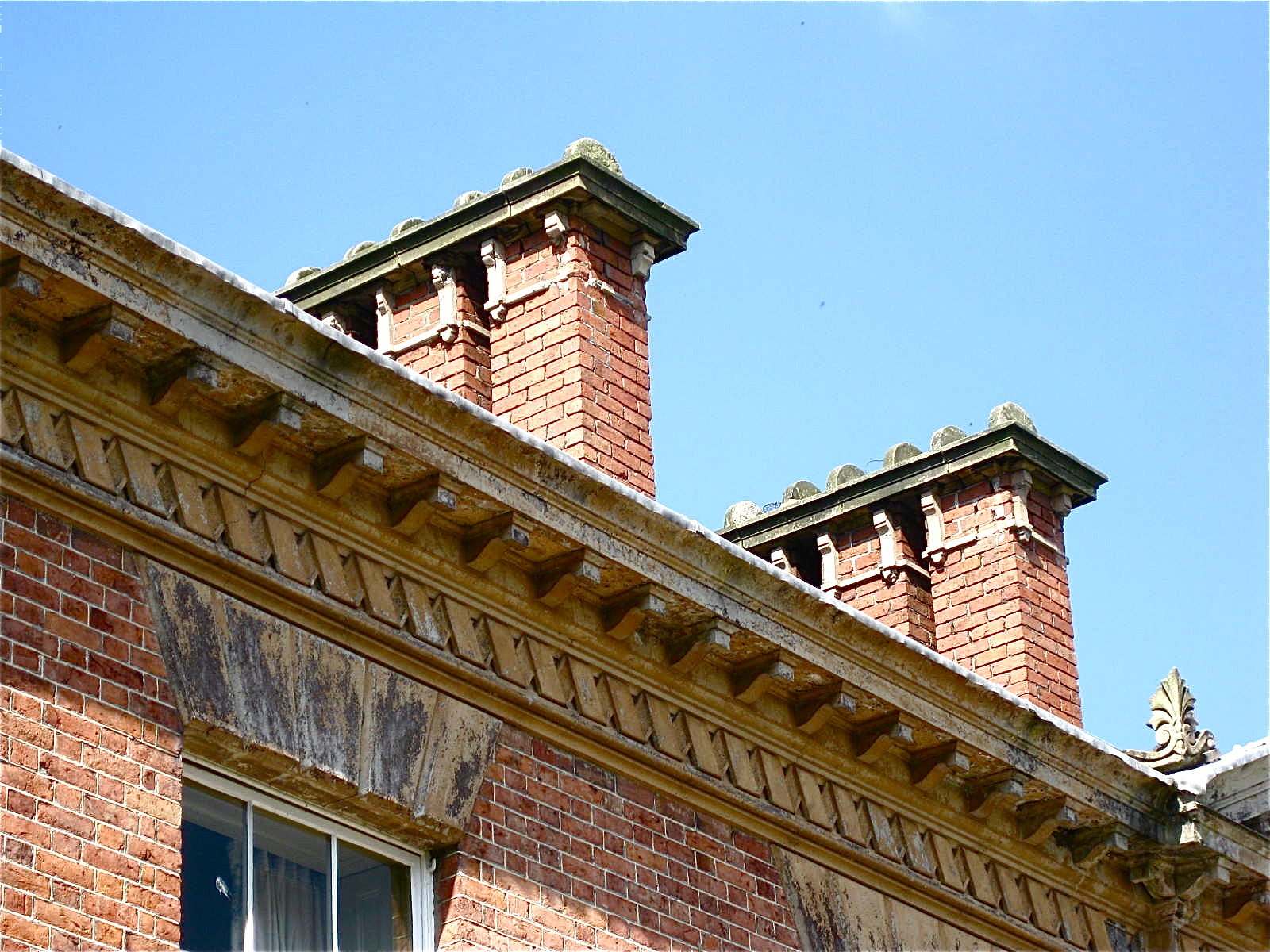
Garthmyl Hall. Frieze and chimney stacks

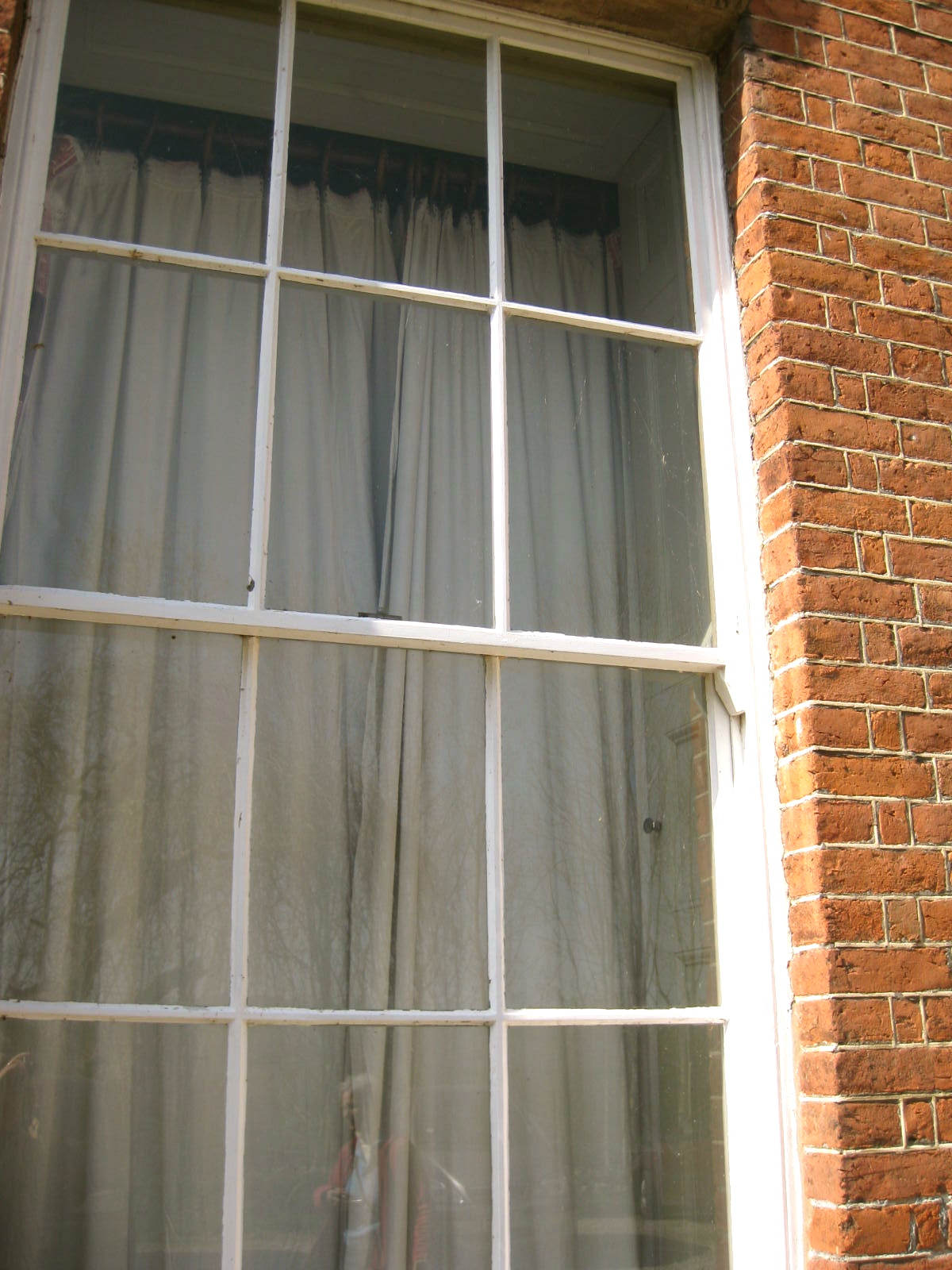
Garthmyl Hall

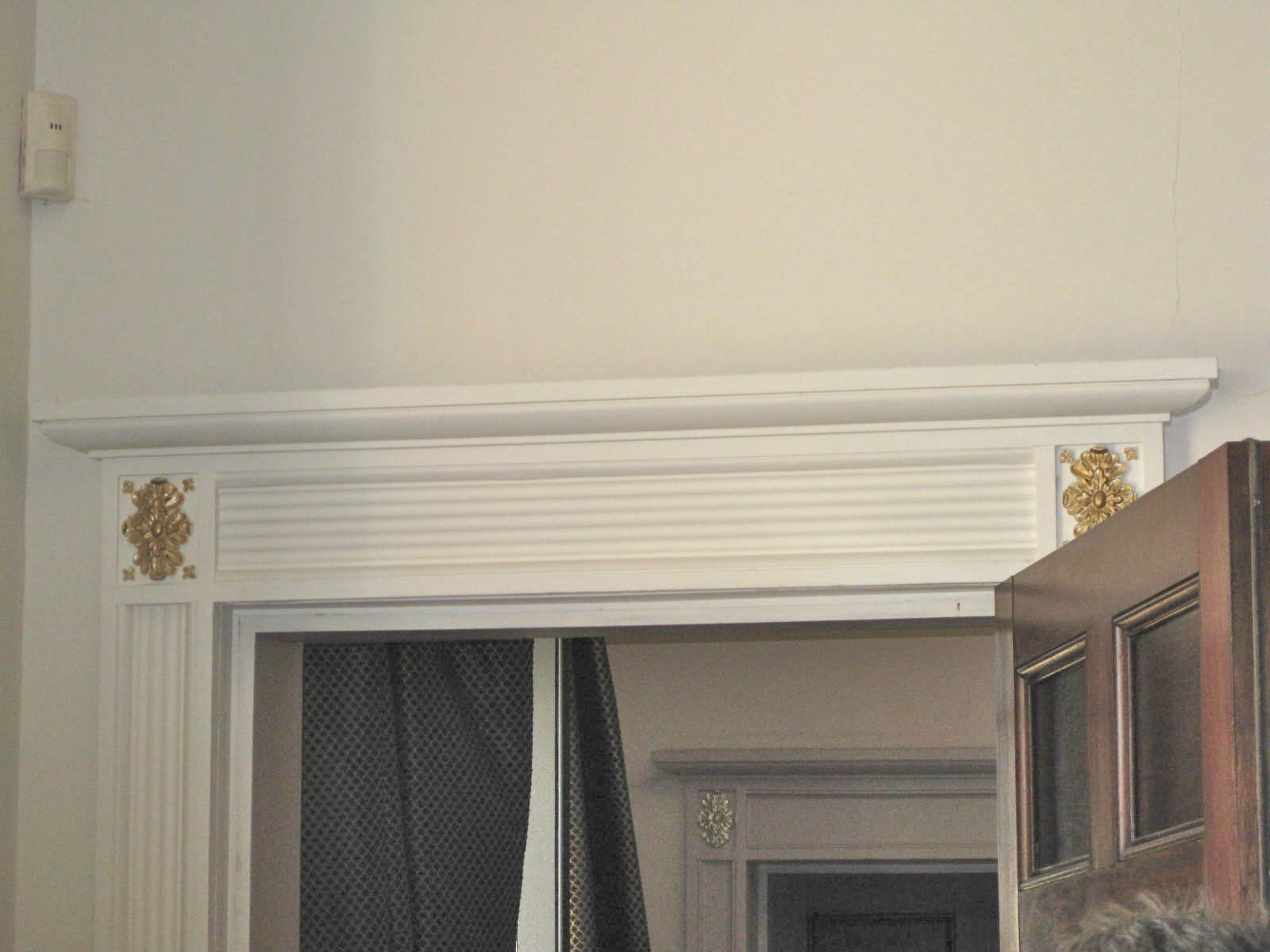
Garthmyl Hall Door surround

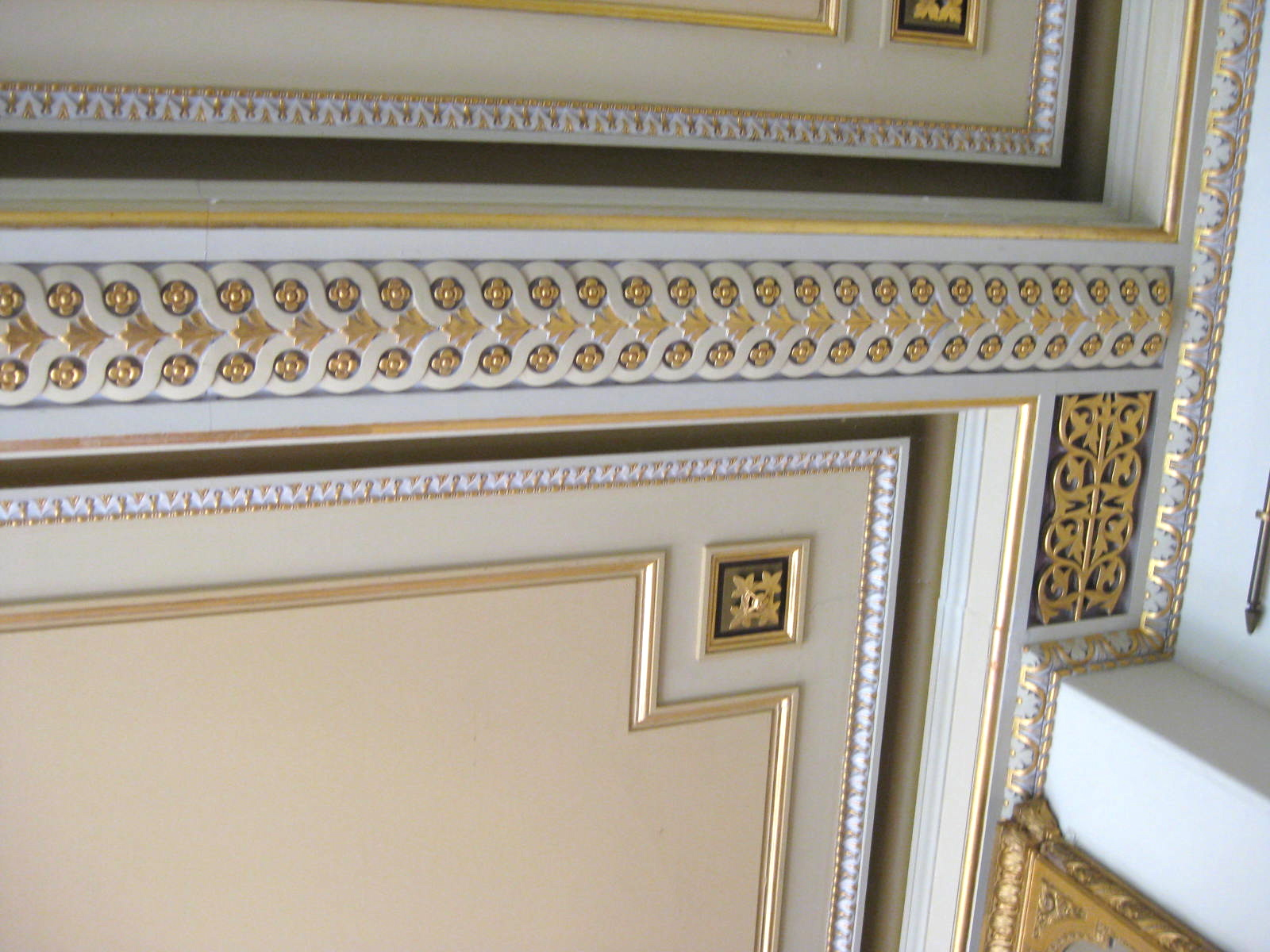
Garthmyl Hall Gilded ceiling

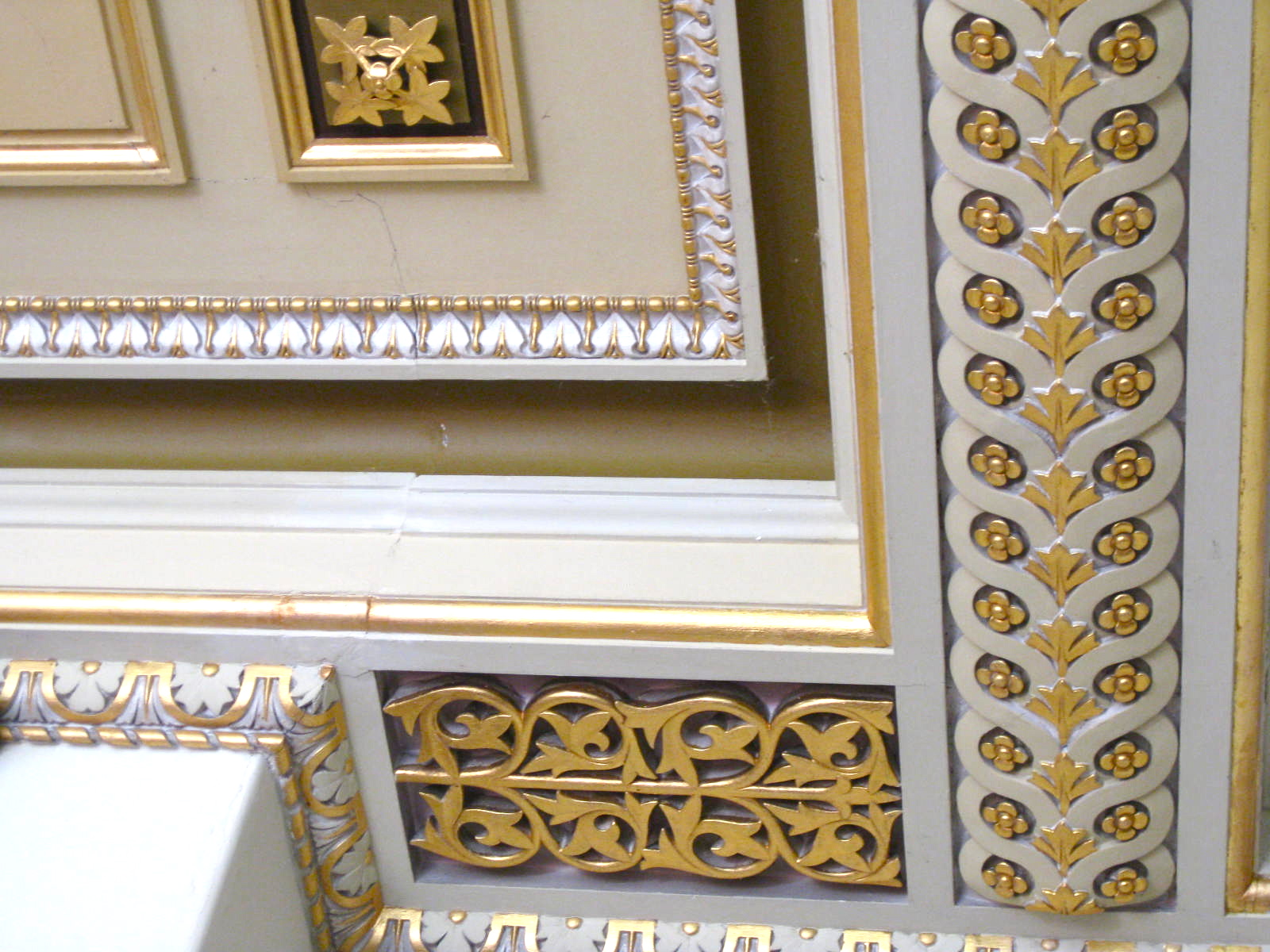
Garthmyl Hall Gilded ceiling

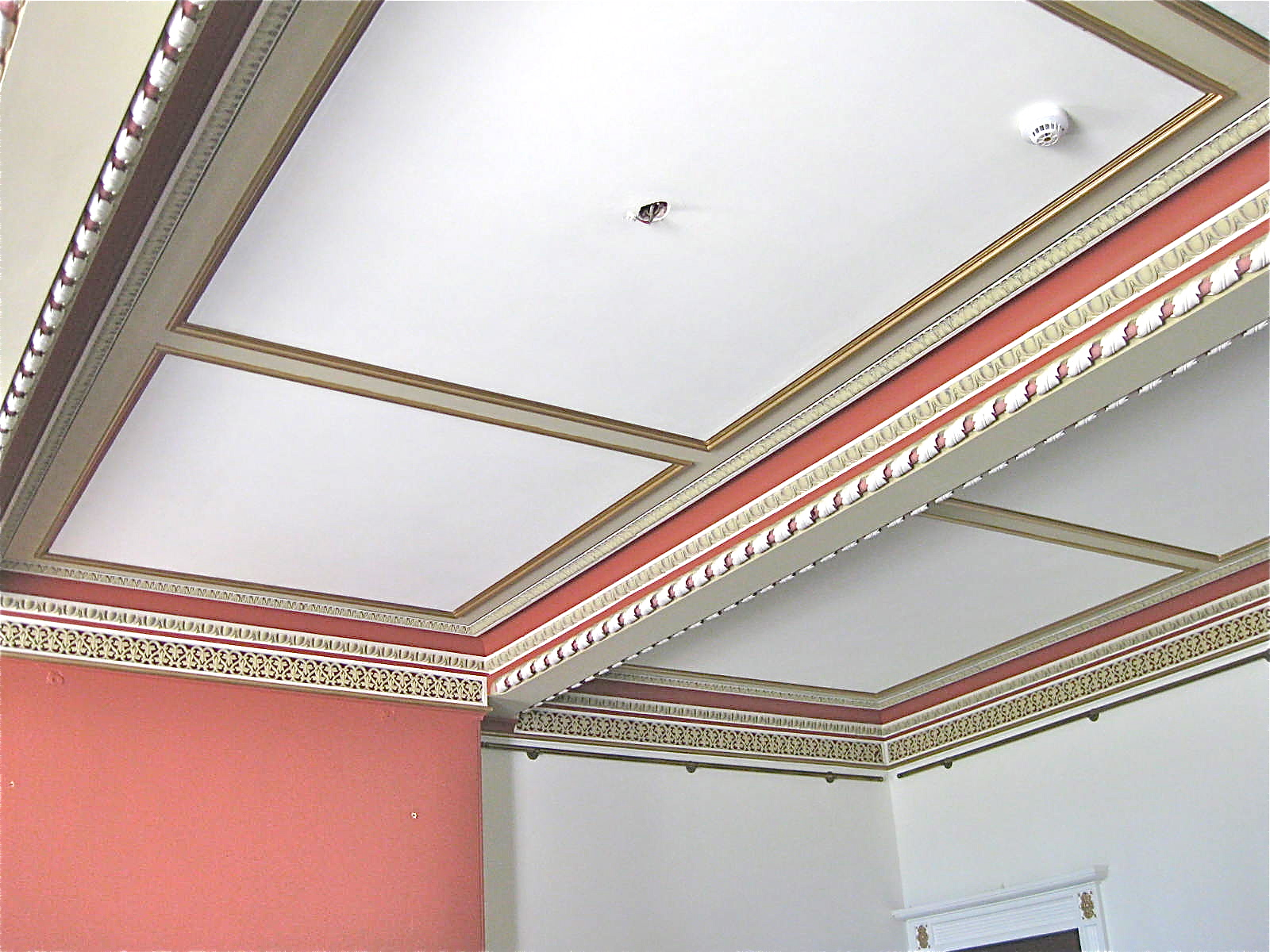
Garthmyl Hall Painted ceiling

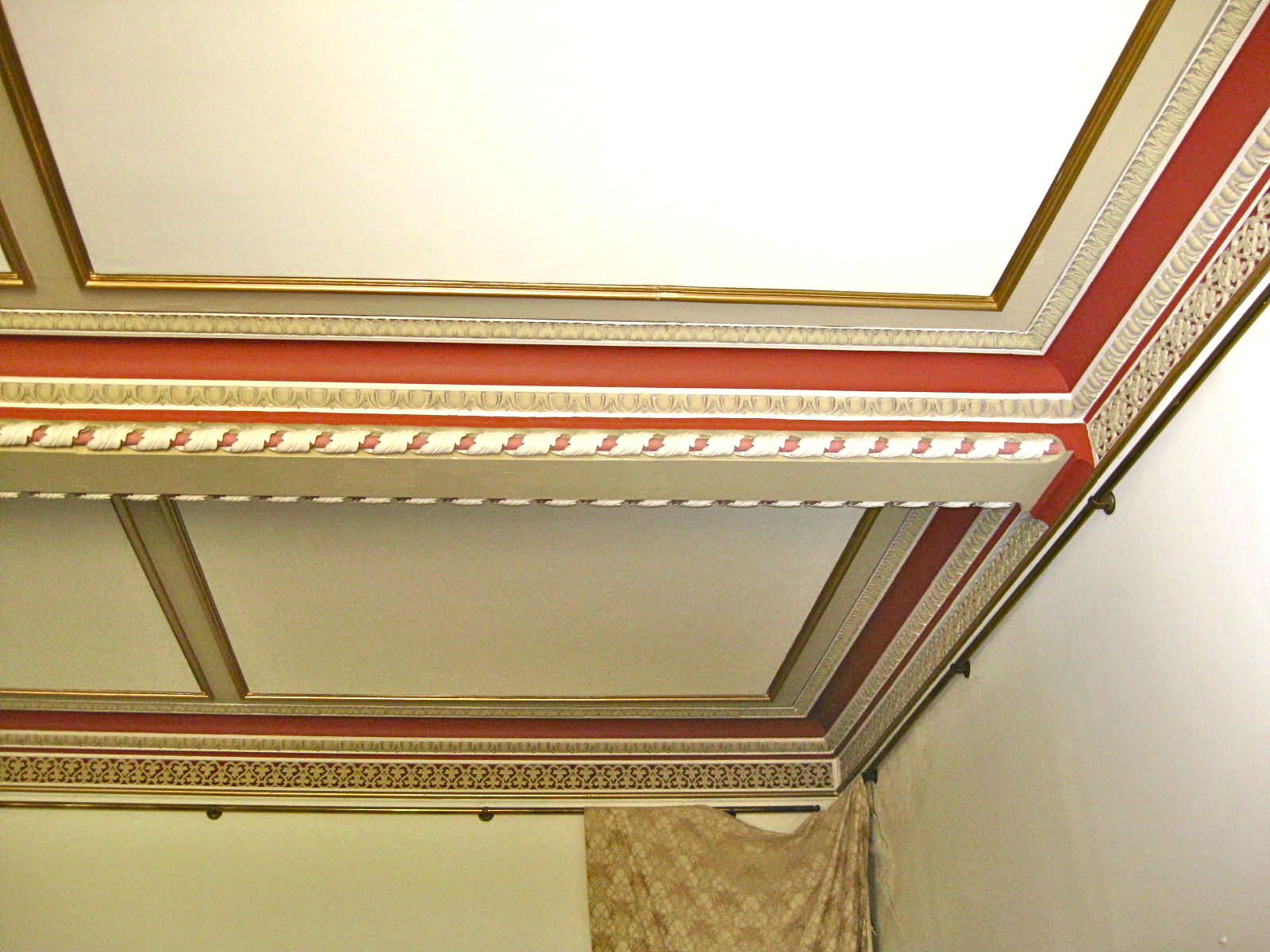
Garthmyl Hall Painted ceiling and original picture hanging bars.

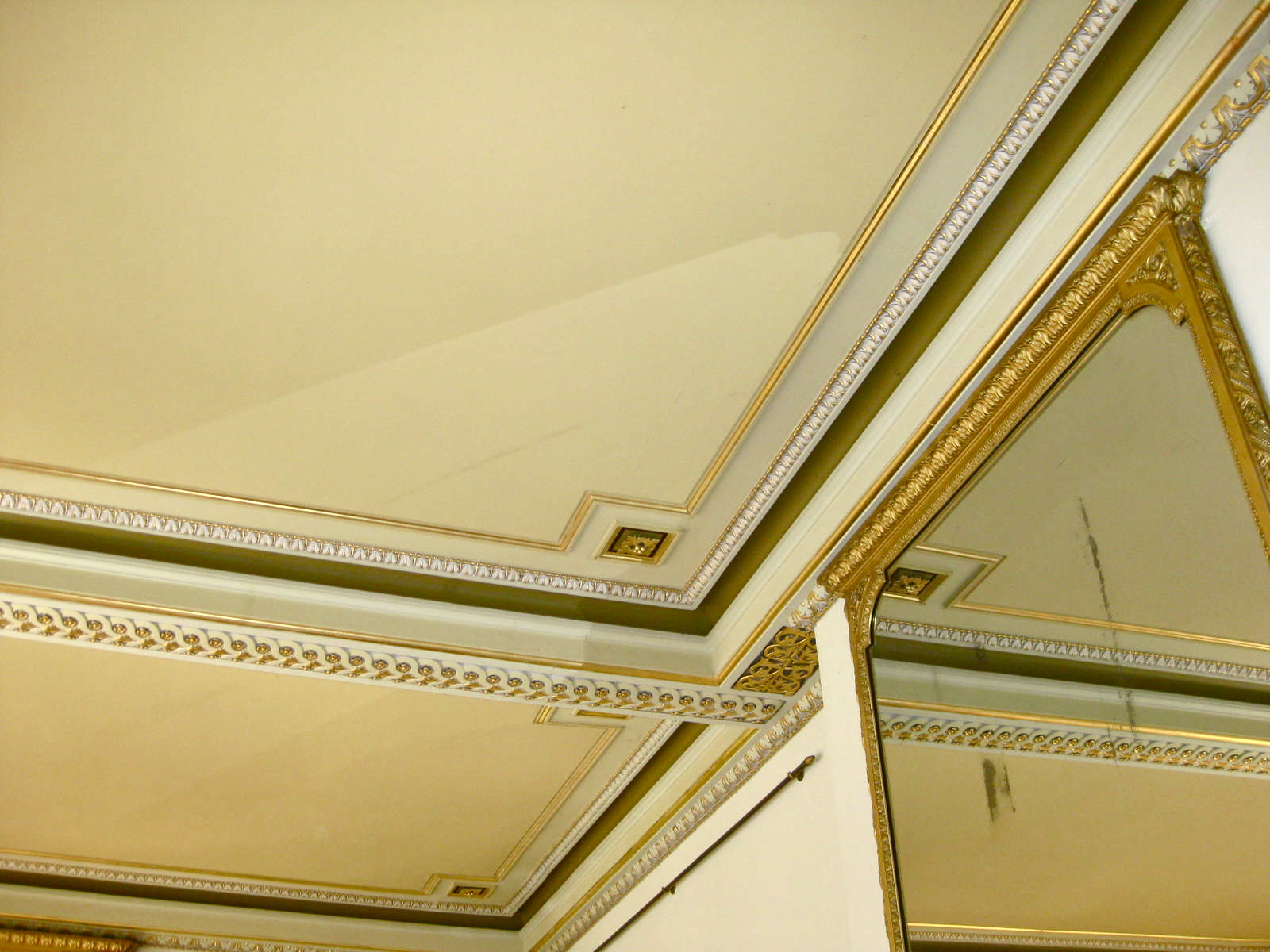
Garthmyl Hall Gilded ceiling decoration

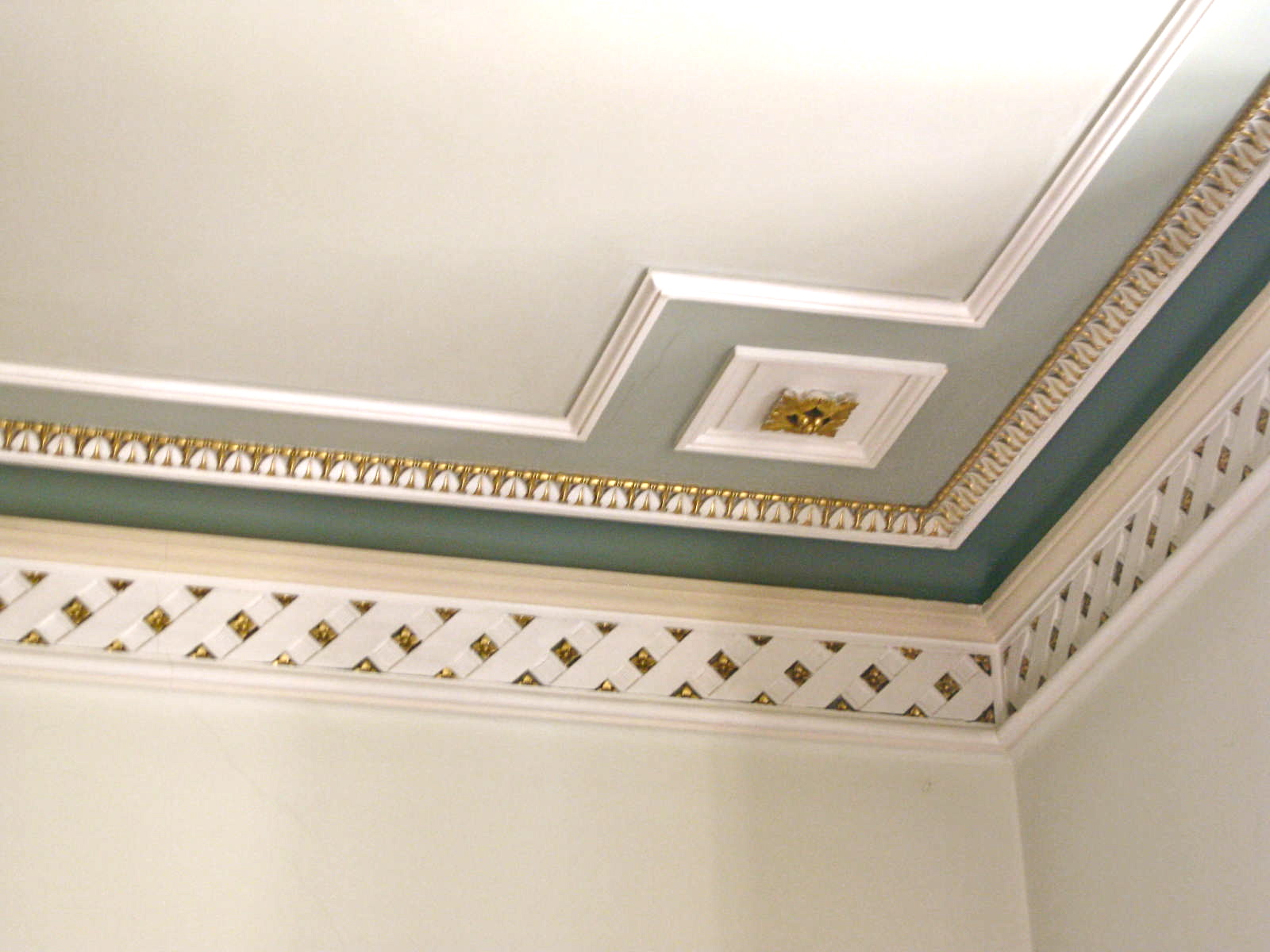
Garthmyl Hall Gilded ceiling decoration

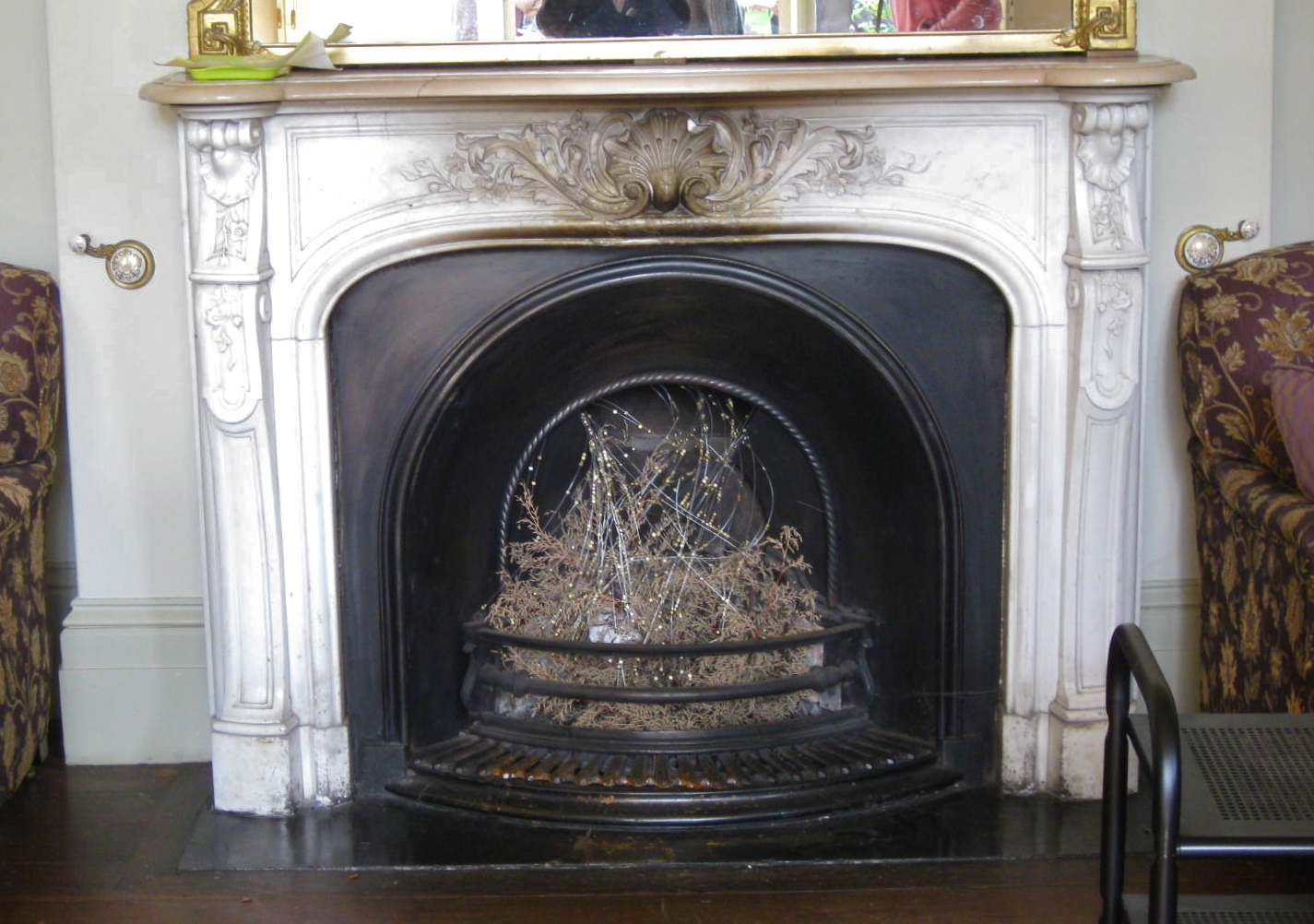
Garthmyl Hall Marble chimney surround

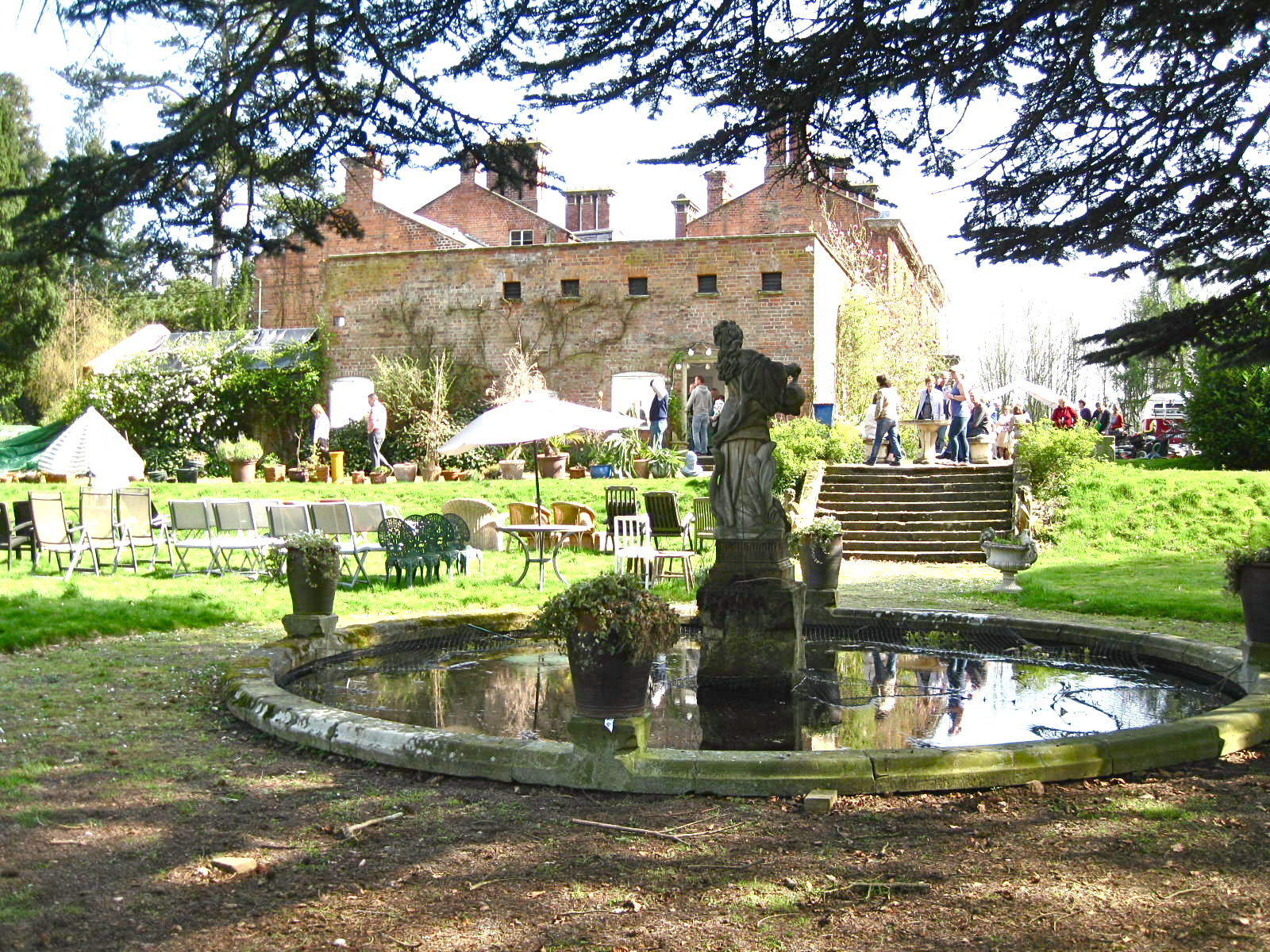
Garthmyl Hall. Pool and statue to N of Hall

== Literature ==
- Antonia Brodie (ed) Directory of British Architects, 1834–1914: 2 Vols, British Architectural Library, Royal Institute of British Architects, 2001, pg 414
- R Scourfield and R Haslam The Buildings of Wales: Powys; Montgomeryshire, Radnorshire and Breconshire Yale University Press 2013.
