= Albany (Liverpool) =

Listed building in Liverpool, England

Albany Building
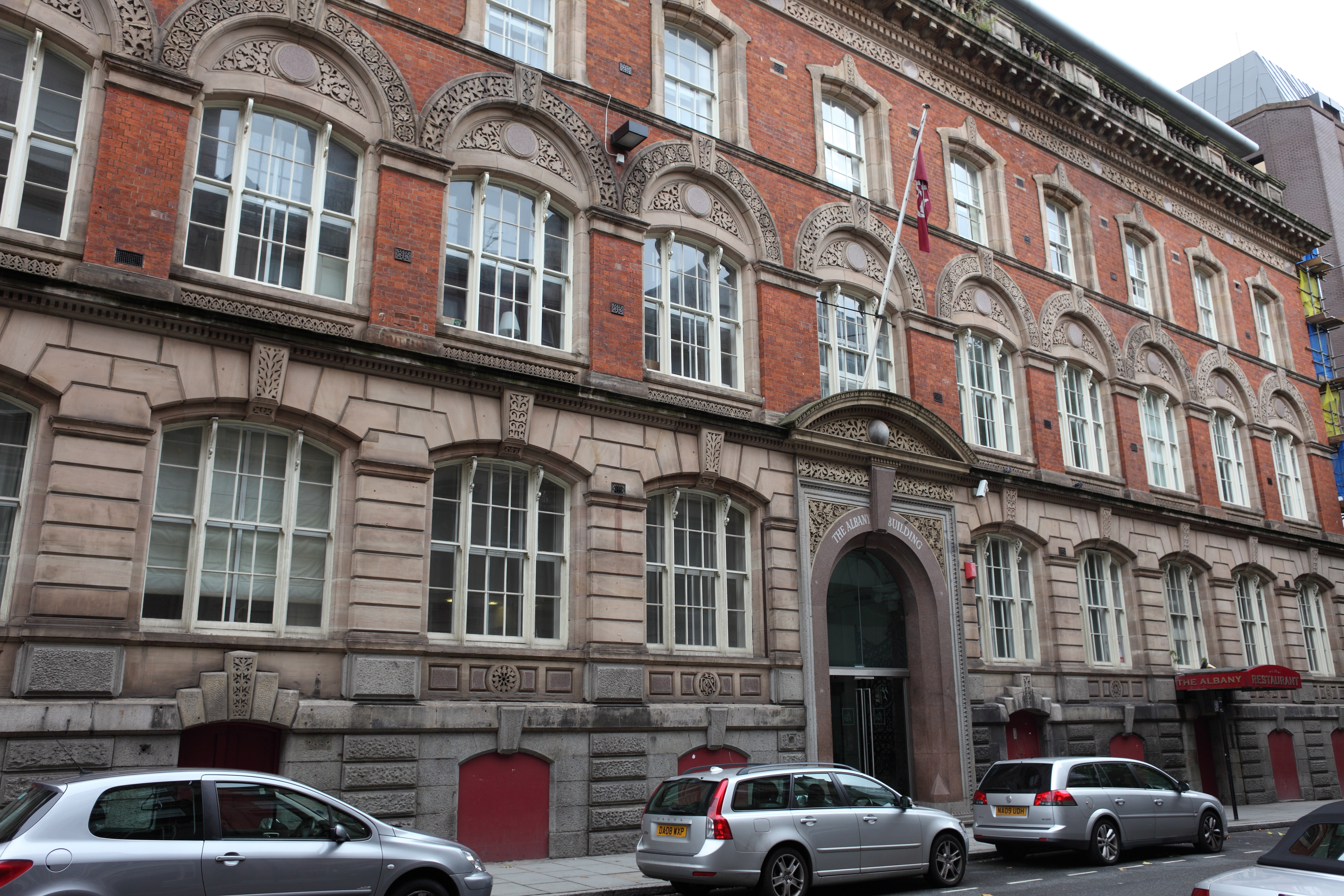
- The building in 2010
- Interactive map of the Albany Building area

General information
- Location: Old Hall Street, Liverpool, England
- Coordinates: 53.4087°N 2.9926°W
- Year built: 1856
- Client: Richard Naylor

Design and construction
- Architect: J. K. Colling
- Designations

Listed Building – Grade II*
- Official name: The Albany
- Designated: 12 July 1966
- Reference no.: 1208630

The Albany Building is a 19th-century Grade II* listed building on Old Hall Street in Liverpool, England. Originally built as a meeting place for cotton brokers, it has since been converted into apartments.

== History ==
The Albany Building is located on Old Hall Street, at the western edge of Liverpool's city centre, and a short walk from Moorfields rail station. Constructed in 1856 at the height of the city's expansion, it is one of Liverpool's most highly regarded works of architecture. The Albany Building was built under the instruction of local banker and racehorse owner Richard Naylor and designed by J. K. Colling. It was built as a meeting place for cotton brokers and contained offices, meeting rooms, and warehousing facilities in the basement. It is one of the earliest examples of Victorian offices in Liverpool. The central courtyard is uncovered and provides good mutual light for the brokers to examine their cotton samples. The building gained Grade II* listed status on 12 July 1966. During the 1970s to 1980s, it was mainly used as offices, warehousing, and storage. The building was sympathetically renovated and converted into apartments in 2004–05.

The Albany comprises 137 apartments in total, made up of two and three-bedroom luxury apartments and penthouses. The building has a 24-hour concierge service and features a bespoke car parking stacker system designed and installed by Wöhr Parking, using a short space to store 84 cars. The courtyard can be seen through the glass doors from the street and has the largest outdoor Swarovski crystal chandeliers in Europe.

== Architecture ==
The building is three storeys plus a basement, and its front on Old Hall Street has eleven bays. The basement is constructed in rusticated granite, the ground floor in rusticated ashlar, and the upper storeys in brick with stone dressings. The round-arched entrance is in the central bay and consists of a granite surround with a keystone, carvings in the spandrels. Over this is a frieze and a segmental pediment. The ground floor windows are three-light sashes, with segmental heads and keystones. Above the windows is a cornice. The first-floor windows also have segmental heads, containing carved archivolts and tympana. The windows on the top floor are smaller, with stone architraves and keystones. Along the top of the building is a carved frieze, a cornice supported by brackets, and a balustraded parapet. The side elevations are plainer and still include cast-iron cranes. The main entrance contains the original cast iron gates. Inside is a coffered and barrel vaulted passage leading to the central courtyard, containing red granite columns and decorated with elaborate plasterwork.

== In popular culture ==
The Albany was used in the filming of the China Miéville TV adaptation The City & the City. Ormond Street is a popular spot for filming and the building has appeared in several recent TV productions, The Ipcress File, The Irregulars, The Five and The Curse.

== Gallery ==
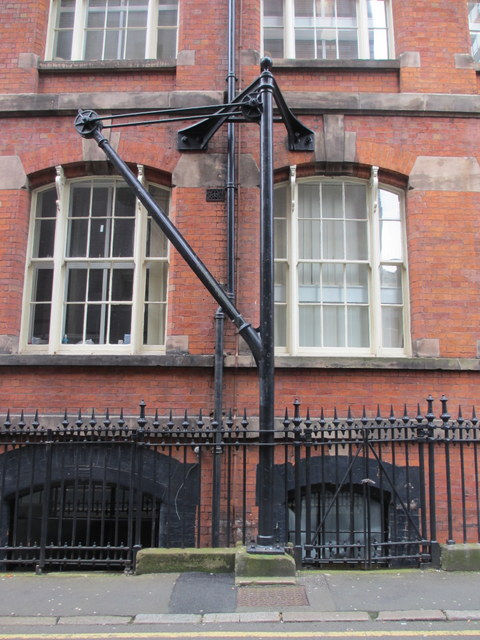
Wall crane and gate in the iron railings, to the basement warehouse below

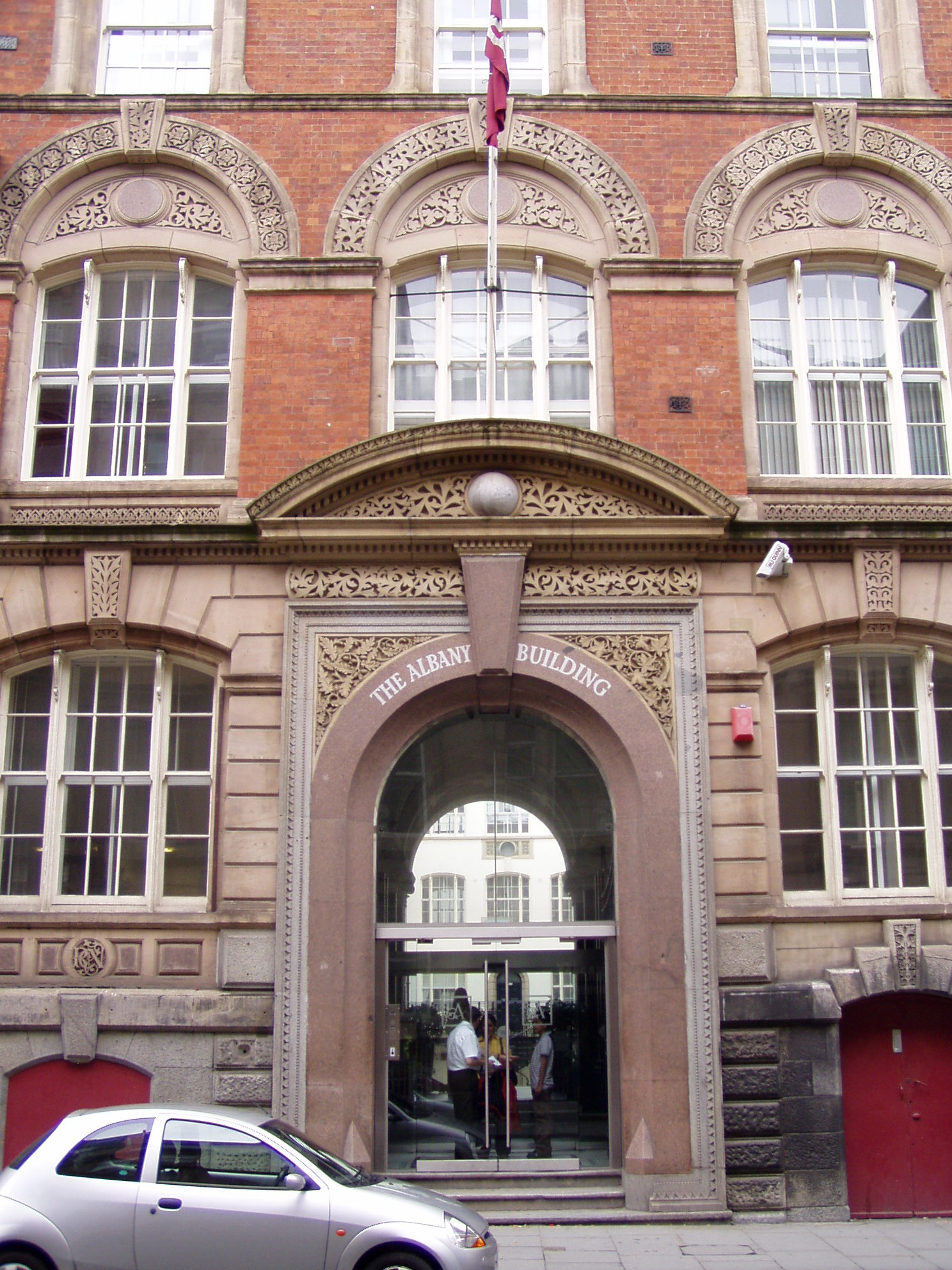
The Albany's entrance

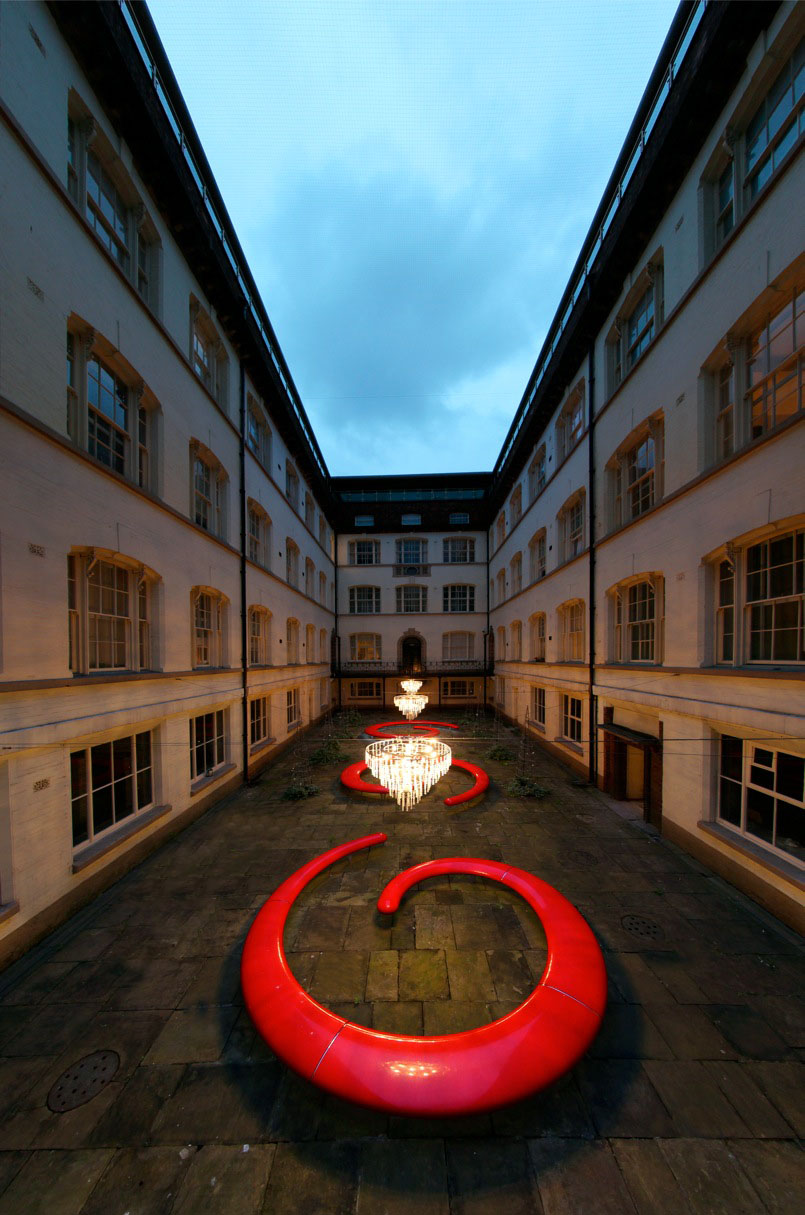
The Albany's courtyard

== See also ==
- Architecture of Liverpool
- Grade II* listed buildings in Liverpool – City Centre
- Grade II* listed buildings in Merseyside
