= James Kellaway Colling =

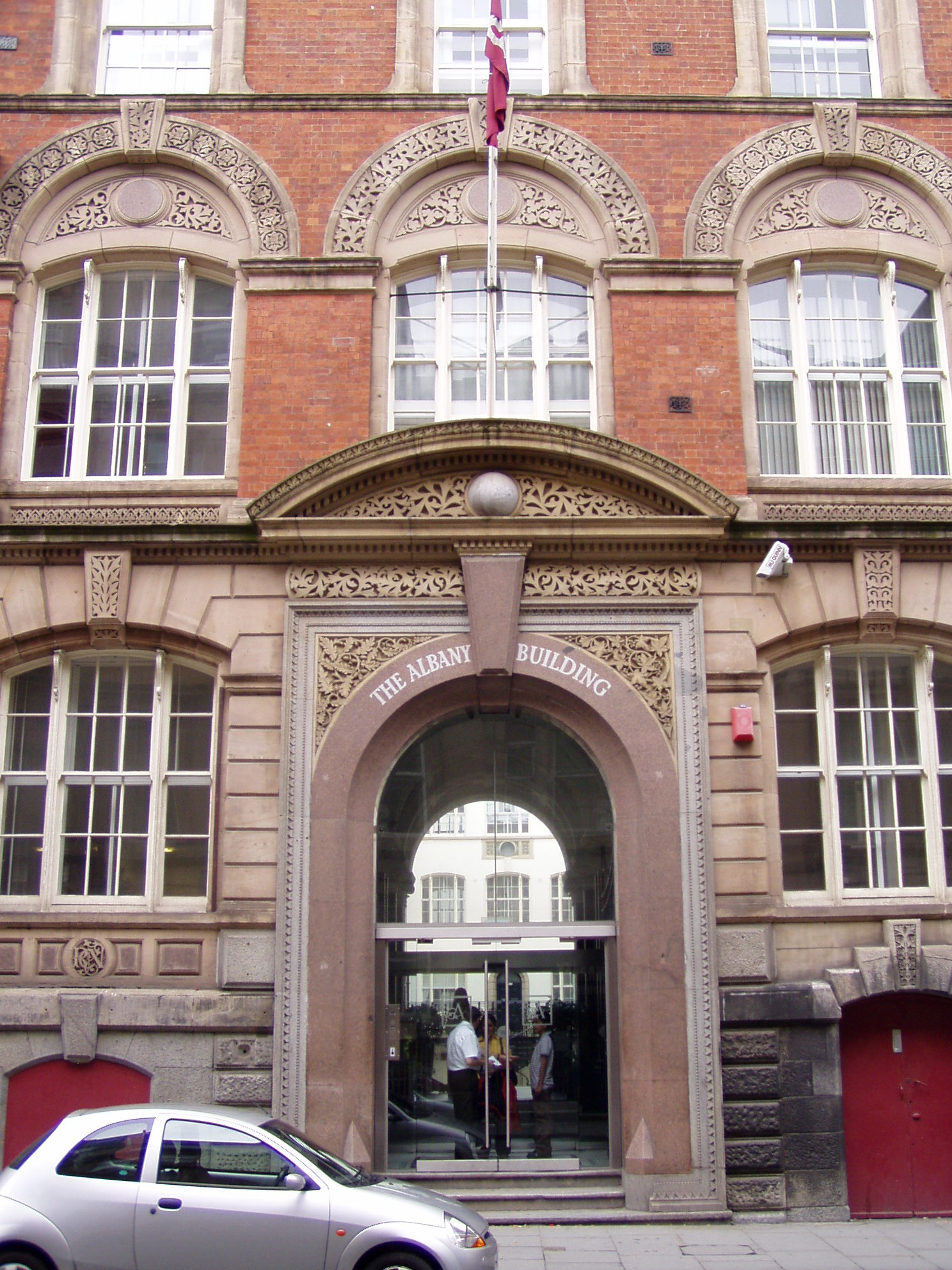
- The Albany Building, Old Hall Street, Liverpool
- Born: 1816 ?London, England
- Died: 1905 (aged 88–89); Wandsworth, London, England
- Education: Pupil of Mathew Habershon; John Brown and John Colson (of Norwich).
- Occupation: Architect
- Practice: Office of Sir George Gilbert Scott 1841-42.
- Buildings: The Albany, Liverpool; Garthmyl Hall, Montgomeryshire and Ashwicke Hall, Marshfield, Gloucestershire

James Kellaway Colling (1816–1905) or J. K. Colling was an English architect, watercolour artist and noted book illustrator. He was a pioneer of early Chromolithographic printing and his graphic work has been compared with that of William Morris and John Ruskin

== Career ==
Initially Colling trained as an engineer and then from 1832 worked in the architectural office of Mathew Habershon (1789–1852) Habershon was talented artist and an early enthusiast for timber-framed houses, publishing in 1836 The Ancient Half Timbered Houses of England. Between 1836 and 1840 he moved to Norwich to work under firstly John Brown and then, John Colson, who specialised in Church architecture, and it was during this period that Colling started preparing his illustrations of painted church furnishings and sculpture in East Anglian Churches.

== Work as an illustrator ==
Initially Colling does not appear to have had much success as an architect and he may instead have been concentrating on architectural illustration. He took pupils in to teach them architectural drawing. These pupils included William Eden Nesfield and the future American architect John Hubbard Sturgis. It is as a pioneer of chromolithographic printing that Colling must be particularly remembered. The technique of chromolithography, or using lithography for colour printing, had spread to Britain from Europe in the mid-1840s. This provided Colling an opportunity to illustrate the painted Medieval screens or encaustic floor tiles that he had recorded in East Anglian churches. His first volume of Gothic Ornaments: Being a Series of Examples of Enriched Details and Accessories of the Architecture of Great Britain appeared in 1838 and was an early venture of the publisher George Bell. Like Ruskin, he despised whitewash, proclaiming in Chapter II of his second volume: "That love of white wash, to which the Church Wardens of the last century were so pertinaciously addicted, was a puritanical notion, which was, probably, handed down to them from the time of the Reformation; and the sooner it is altogether got rid of along with the white ceilings of our dwelling houses, the better". He then went on until 1865 publishing a series of books on Medieval detailing and decoration using many coloured prints. In the introduction to the first volume of Gothic Ornament, Colling mentions the support he has been given by Ewan Christian and it is likely that Christian used Colling's design for the Commissioners' churches. Later, when Christian in 1895 designed the west front of the National Portrait Gallery, Colling provided drawings for the detailing. In later life Colling devoted more time to producing watercolours of London buildings and street scenes.

== Architectural practice ==
In the mid-1850s Colling was able to establish his architectural practice through contact with the Liverpool banking family, the Naylors, the owners of the Leyland and Bullins Bank.

This led to a number of major projects:

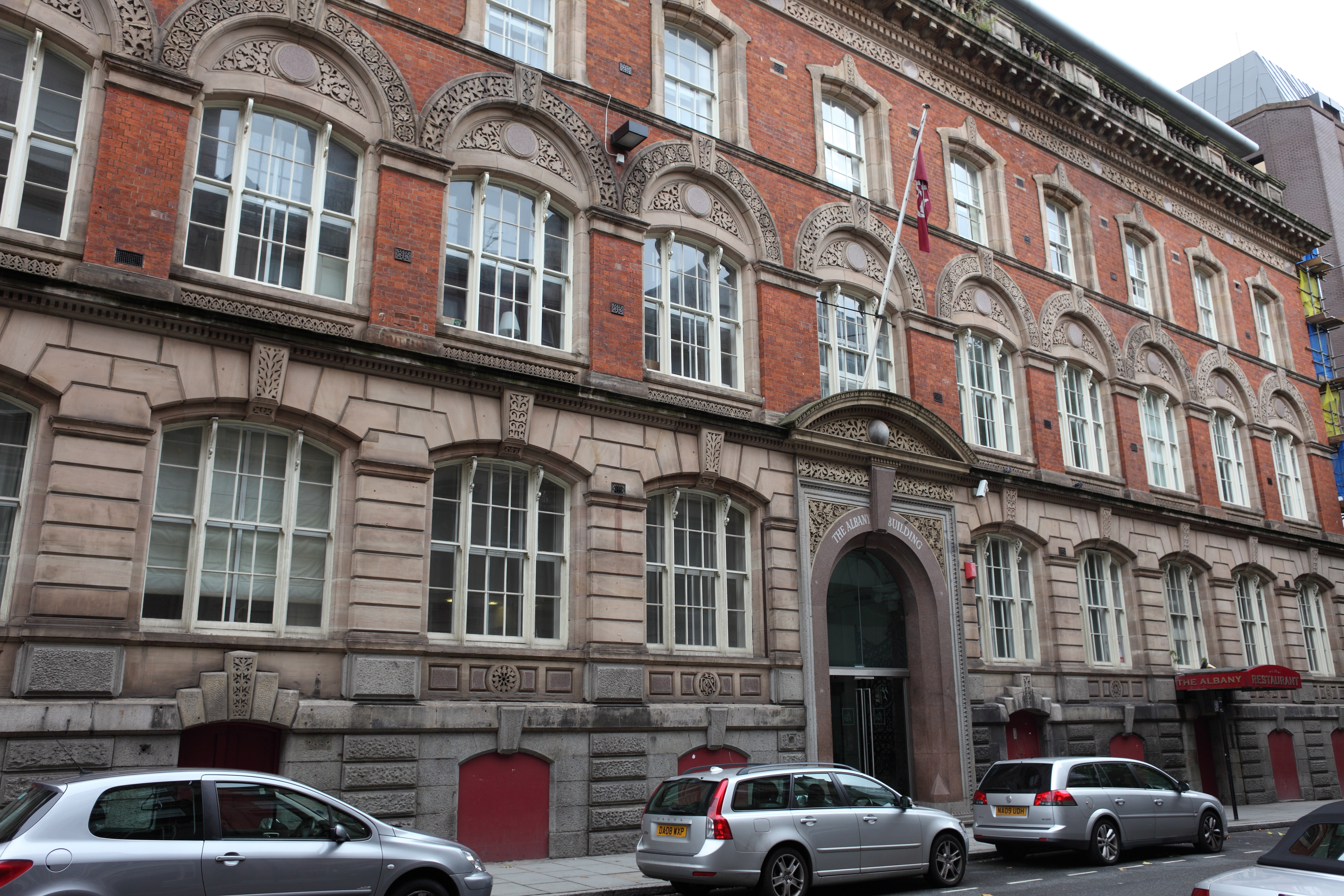
The Albany, Liverpool

=== Hooton Hall ===
The first of these projects was the partial rebuilding of Hooton Hall on the Wirral. The Hooton Estate was purchased by Richard Naylor in 1849 from Sir Massy Stanley, who had run up gambling debts. Colling was commissioned to provide plans for a new tower in Italianate style and an orangery. Hooton Hall was demolished in 1932, but some of the columns from the orangery were preserved by Clough Williams-Ellis at Portmeirion.

=== The Albany in Liverpool. ===
The Albany was erected in 1856 for Richard Naylor, and it was built as a meeting place for cotton brokers. It contained offices and meeting rooms, together with warehousing facilities in the basement. It is one of the earliest examples of Victorian offices in Liverpool. The central courtyard was originally uncovered, to provide good light for the brokers to examine their cotton samples. To undertake this work Colling formed a partnership with his former pupil John Hubbard Sturgis, now working as an architect at Leatherhead. Sturgis' father was Russell Sturgis an American merchant from Boston who was now chairman of Barings Bank. This may provide the connection with the Naylors who were major Liverpool bankers. Colling appears to have provided the plans, while Sturgis supervised the work.

=== Nantclwyd Hall, Denbighshire ===
In 1843 Nantclwyd Hall was purchased from the Kenrick family by Richard Christopher Naylor and in 1857 he got Colling to produce plans for the enlargement of the house which included the south-east wing, in a style matching the original house, except for the substitution of sash windows for mullion-and-transom windows. This part contains a nursery wing with fine plasterwork ceilings.

=== Ashwicke Hall ===
Colling's next project in 1857–60, (presumably as the result of the Albany), was the building of Ashwicke Hall in Marshfield, Gloucestershire for the Liverpool Attorney John Orred. This was a massive castellated Tudor Gothic House with a lofty octagonal tower at the S E. Corner. The octagonal tower is very similar to the octagonal tower at Leighton Hall, Powys in Montgomeryshire. Colling is also likely to be the architect for the castelatted gatehouse to Ashwicke Park and Ashwicke Grange.

=== Garthmyl Hall ===
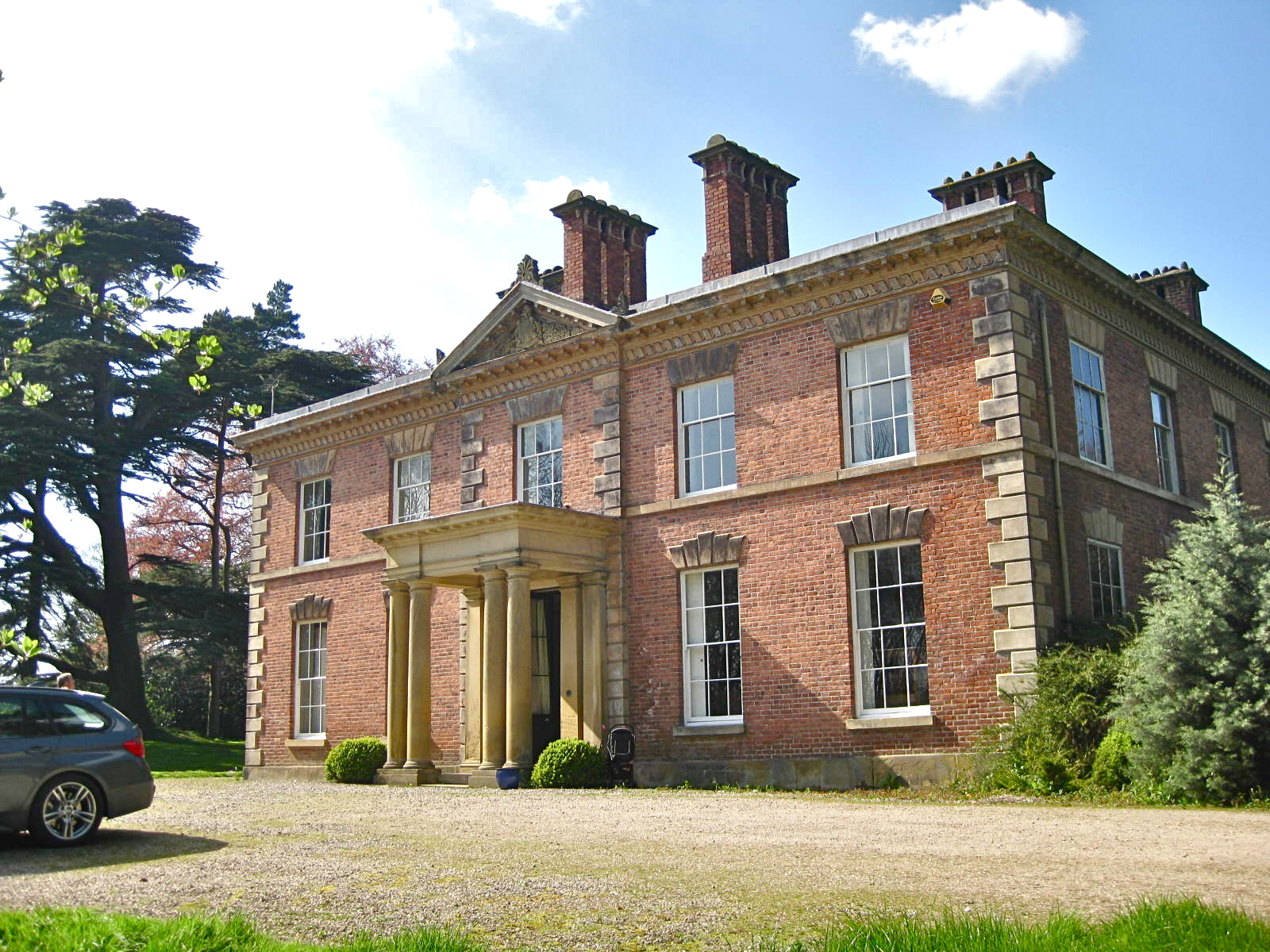
Garthmyl Hall by J K Colling, 1859

A further commission was in 1859 from John Naylor, brother of Richard Naylor, who was also a banker and Montgomeryshire landowner to re-build Garthmyl Hall, Berriew for his brother-in-law Major-General William George Gold. Colling was given a free hand by the wealthy John Naylor when building Garthmyl Hall, as seen by the use of lavish gilding and plasterwork for ceiling decoration, and for the ornamental terracotta on the exterior. This was an opportunity for him to put into practice some of the designs illustrated in his books.

=== Church architecture ===
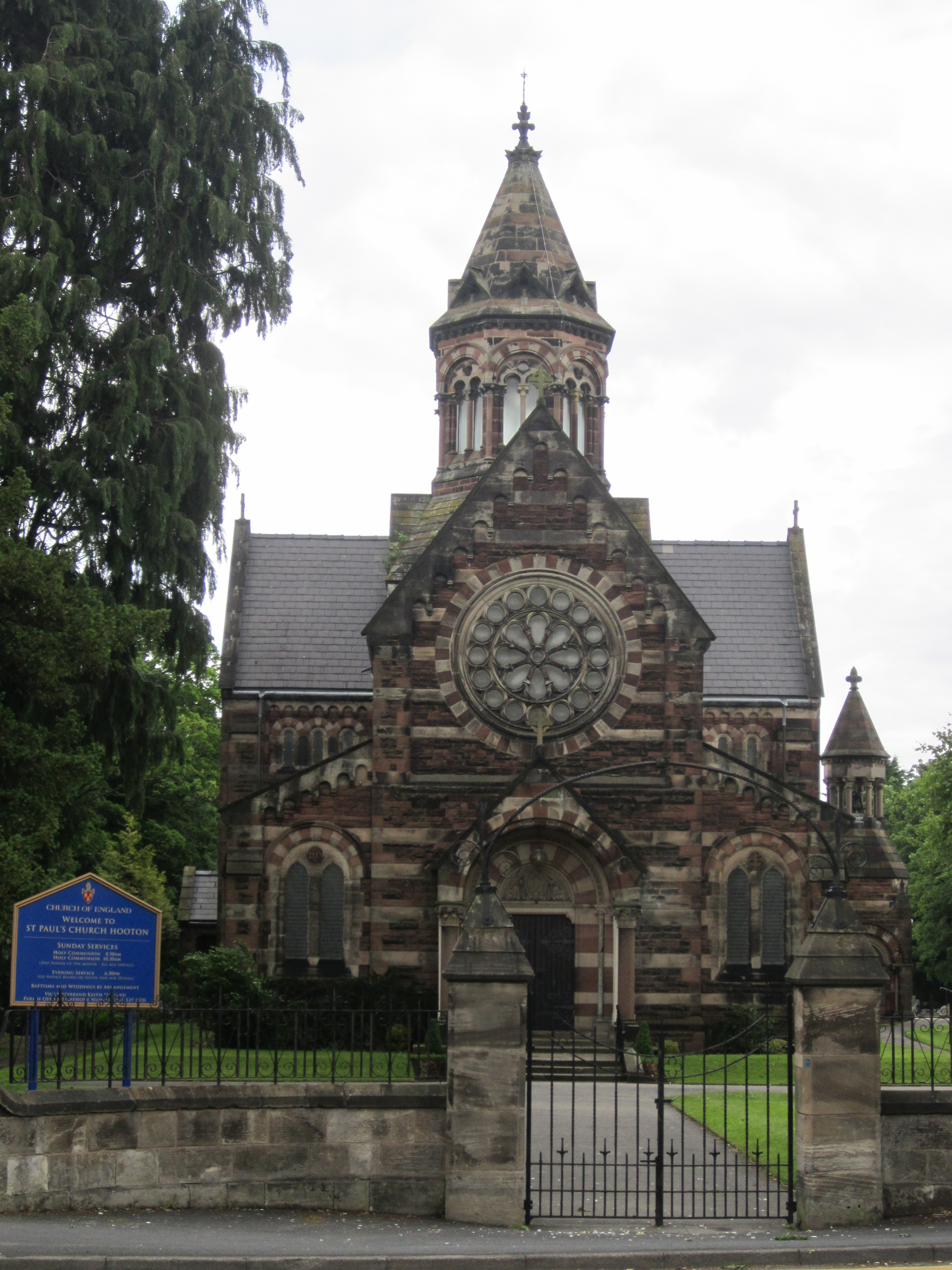
St Paul's Church, Hooton

Colling was also responsible for some church architecture and restoration work, including a new aisle for Scole church in Norfolk. His most impressive example of church architecture was St Paul's Church, Hooton, built from his designs for Richard Naylor between 1858 and 1862.

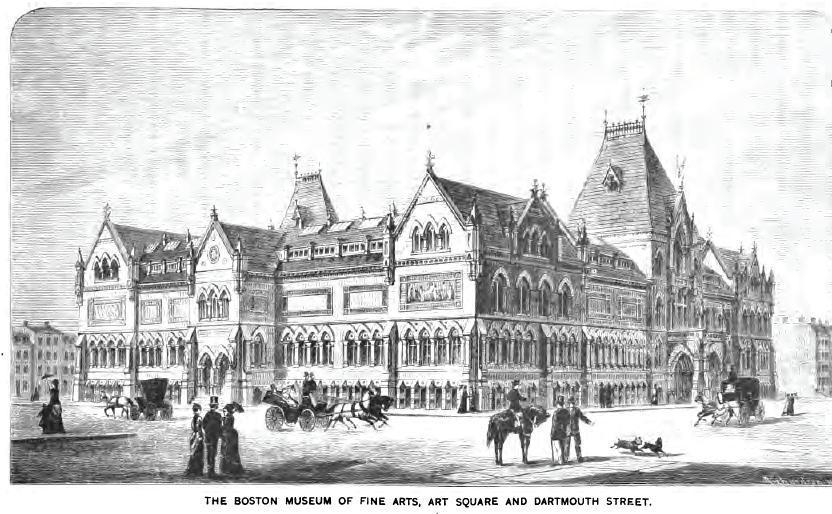
Boston Museum of Fine Arts

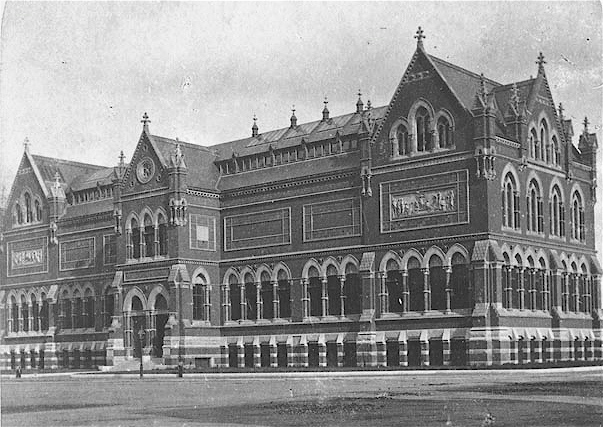
Boston Museum of Fine Arts

=== Work in the United States ===
Colling's partner Sturgis became interested in replacing the carved stone with the cheaper Terracotta, for decorating their buildings and started to bring in commissions from Boston, using moulded terracotta from Blashfield's works at Stamford. In 1869 Colling provided designs for "Pinebank'’ a house in Boston and in 1870 Colling provided some of the designs for the elaborately decorated Museum of Fine Arts in Boston. Although it was demolished in 1906, it was one of the first major buildings in the US to be decorated with terracotta ornamentation.

== Architectural works include ==
- Garthmyl Hall, Berriew, Montgomeryshire Garthmyl Hall was completely rebuilt in 1859 by Colling for Major-General William George Gold.
- Albany Building in Liverpool. This was speculative venture for John Naylor's brother Richard.
- Ashwicke Hall in Marshfield, Gloucestershire for the Liverpool attorney John Orred 1857–1860
- Cuxwold Hall, Cuxwold, Lincolnshire. 1861. Tudor Gothic with red brick and blue brick diaperwork with chimneys and bellcote with spirelet.

== Publications ==
- 1848–1850 Gothic Ornaments, Being a Series of Examples of Enriched Details and Accessories of the Architecture of Great Britain, Bell
- 1852-1856 Details of Gothic Architecture from existing Examples
- 1865 Art Foliage for sculpture and Decoration
- 1874 Examples of English Medieval foliage and coloured decoration : taken from buildings of the twelfth to the fifteenth century: with descriptive letterpress.
- 1881 (with John Leighton) Suggestions in Design

== Literature ==
- Brodie, Antonia (ed.) Directory of British Architects, 1834–1914: 2 vols, London: British Architectural Library, Royal Institute of British Architects, 2001
- Beckwith, Alice H. R. H. Victorian Bibliomania: The Illuminated Book in Nineteenth-Century Britain. Exhibition catalogue. Providence, Rhode Island: Museum of Art, Rhode Island School of Design, 1987.
- Colvin, H. A Biographical Dictionary of British Architects 1600–1840 Yale University Press, 4th edition; London, 2008.
- Jervis, Simon. The Penguin Dictionary of Design and Designers. New York: Penguin, 1984.
- R. Scourfield & R. Haslam The Buildings of Wales: Powys; Montgomeryshire, Radnorshire and Breconshire. Yale University Press, 2013.
