= Caerhowel Bridge =

Caerhowel Bridge Pont Caerhywel
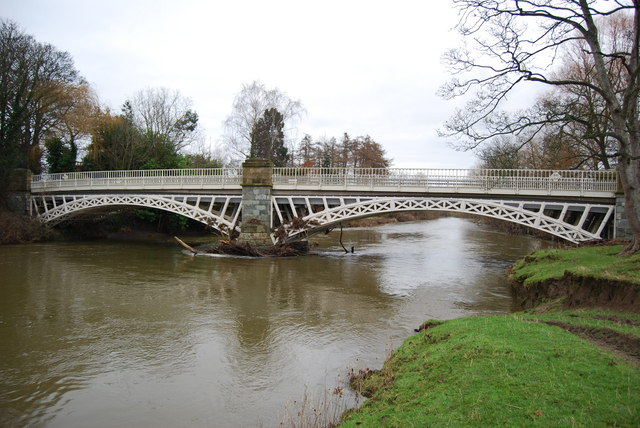
- Coordinates: 52.575178°N 3.186829°W
- OS grid reference: SO 196 981
- Carries: B4385 road
- Crosses: River Severn
- Heritage status: Grade II listed structure

Characteristics
- Material: Cast-iron
- Width: 6.6 metres (22 ft)

History
- Designer: Thomas Penson
- Rebuilt: 1858

Caerhowel Bridge (Welsh: Pont Caerhywel) is a two-arch cast-iron, Grade II listed bridge over the River Severn, west of Caerhowel, Powys, Wales. The 6.6-metre-wide (22 ft) bridge was built on the site of a previous bridge which was possibly destroyed around the late 13th century. A redesigned timber bridge was destroyed after the River Severn flooded in 1852 and a subsequent bridge fell in 1858. The present-day bridge was designed by Thomas Penson making it the third cast-iron bridge in Montgomeryshire and was renovated in the early 21st century.

== Description ==
Caerhowel Bridge is located approximately 0.62 miles (1.00 km) south of the A483 road at Garthmyl and the bridge carries the B4385 road. The bridge is made of cast-iron, with stone abutments and one central pier. It is 6.6 metres (22 ft) wide and is broader than its equivalents in the villages of Llandinam and Abermule. The bridge's pier extends to the east (upstream) side which forms a low-level cutwater. Its deck is installed with cast-iron outer girders with raised panel ornament which bear the inscriptions 'Thomas Penson County Surveyor 1858' and 'Brymbo Company Iron Founders 1858'.

The bridge has two symmetrical arches which have a span of 22.1 metres (73 ft) and consist of five parallel lattice X-shaped ribs which are 760 millimetres (76 cm) deep and are braced by wrought iron tie-bars which connect spandrel struts. Lateral stiffening is ensured with rectangular diaphragms at the segment joints and adjacent ribs are linked with diagonal bracing. Traffic lights are located at both ends of the bridge to control the flow of single-line traffic and two footpaths exist for pedestrians to use.

== History ==
An earlier bridge was built around 1250 and was called Baldwin's Bridge. It was possibly destroyed sometime in the latter half of the 13th century although later records recorded a timber bridge at the site around 1600; it had various names such as Montgomery Bridge, Severn Bridge or New Bridge. The timber bridge was destroyed in 1852, when the River Severn flooded. Thomas Penson, the county surveyor of Montgomeryshire, recommended to the local council the authorisation of the construction of a single-arch iron bridge which was rejected in favour of a suspension bridge designed by civil engineer James Dredge, Sr. The new designed bridge opened in 1854; it was designed on Dredge's patented taper-chain principle and was supported by chains. It collapsed in early 1858 whilst lime from Garthmyl Wharf was being transported by horse; a man called Richard Grist was killed. At an inquest into the collapse it was determined that Caerhowel Bridge had not been maintained sufficiently to secure the safety of transport crossing the bridge.

Penson commissioned the present bridge which was cast at Brymbo Iron Foundry and became third iron-cast bridge in Montgomeryshire. It was maintained by the Hundreds of Newtown and Montgomeryshire and later became a county bridge under the Local Act 1830. The bridge's Grade II listed status was conferred onto it on 30 March 1983. By 1997 a nearby bailey bridge was erected across the roadbed to redirect traffic as Caerhowel Bridge had become unsuited to modern-day traffic demands. Caerhowel Bridge was renovated by Alun Griffiths Contractors of Abergavenny between 2003 and 2004 which strengthened the bridge and allowed for heavy load vehicles to use the bridge. Remnants of the previous timber bridge were discovered against the river's east side after a large flood in 2006.

== See also ==
- Crossings of the River Severn
