= Butchers' Market, Wrexham =

Butchers' Market
- Marchnad y Cigyddion (Welsh)
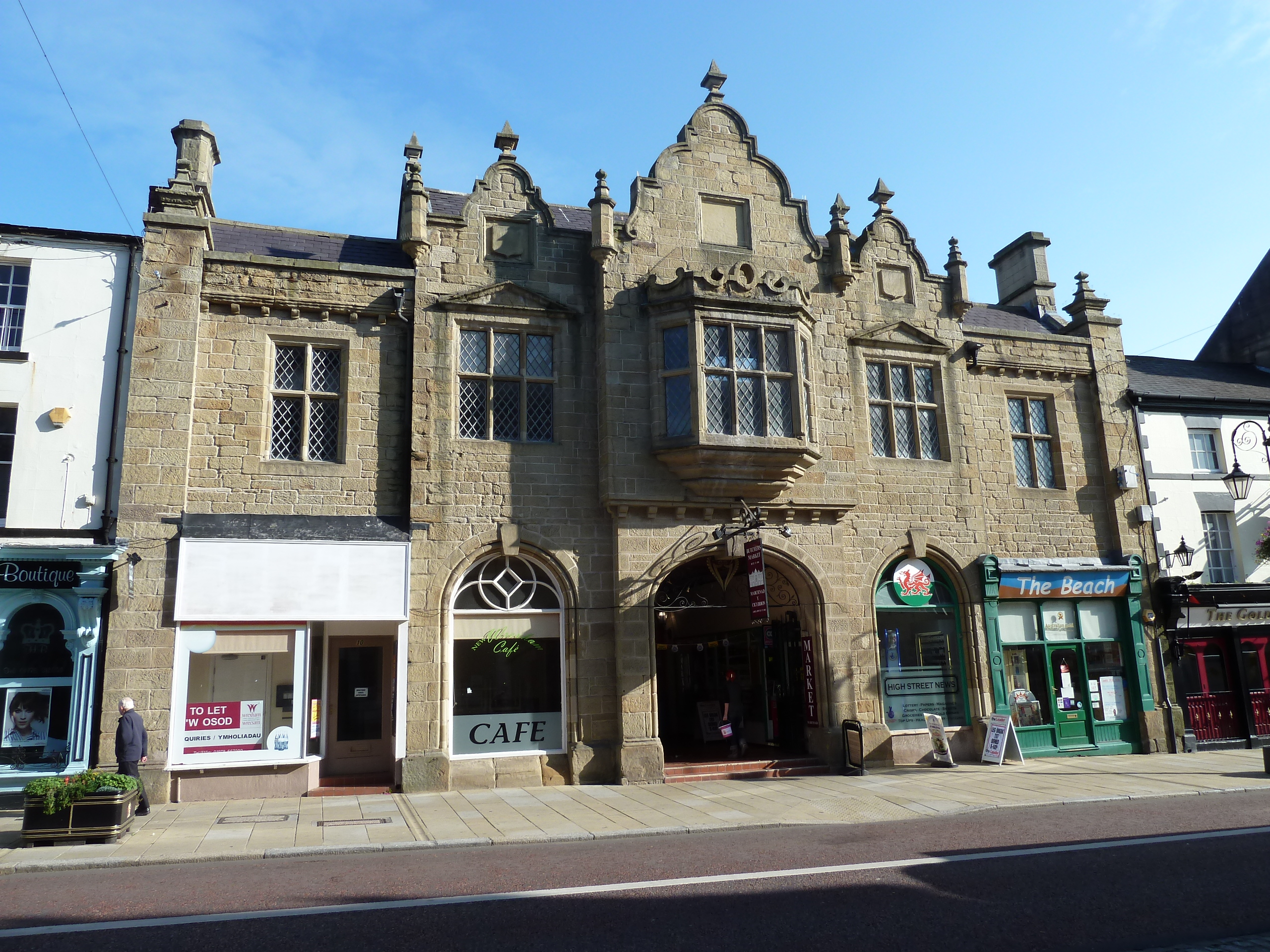
- Entrance on the Wrexham High Street
- Interactive map of the Butchers' Market area

General information
- Type: Market
- Architectural style: Neo-Jacobean
- Location: 10 High St, Wrexham, Wales LL13 8HP
- Coordinates: 53.045362°N 2.992291°W
- Opened: 1848
- Renovated: 2023–24

Technical details
- Floor count: 2

Design and construction
- Architect: Thomas Penson

Listed Building – Grade II
- Official name: Butcher's Market
- Designated: 6 June 1980; Amended 31 January 1994
- Reference no.: 1840

The Butchers' Market (Welsh: Marchnad y Cigyddion) is an indoor market in Wrexham city centre, Wales. It is situated inside a Grade II listed building on Wrexham's High Street. Built in 1848 to the Neo-Jacobean designs of Thomas Penson and extended in 1879–80, it is one of the two dedicated indoor markets of Wrexham.

The indoor market has since suffered from declining visitor numbers over the last few years, as a result Wrexham County Borough Council re-developed the indoor market between 2023 and 2024, with it reopening in November 2024.

== Description ==
The building is Grade II listed. It was designed by Thomas Penson, in an Neo-Jacobean style.

The building's main exterior fronts Wrexham's High Street, with a coursed and squared yellow sandstone façade, described by Edward Hubbard as a "unmistakeable and cheerful Jacobean style". The entrance also has a bell above it, which marked the end of trading hours each day.

An earlier drawing of the building differed from the final design. The windows in the side wings of the building were designed in the earlier drawing to be wider, with lower windows later replaced from the earlier design with shops of late 19th century detailing, and a clock removed from the design due to economical restraints, but one was later donated by local electrician firm Gray's. The building is two-storeys, and once was coated in green paint.

The building's interior market hall is a 8-bay structure and has a timber roof supported with cast iron columns, and wrought iron braces forms the aisles.

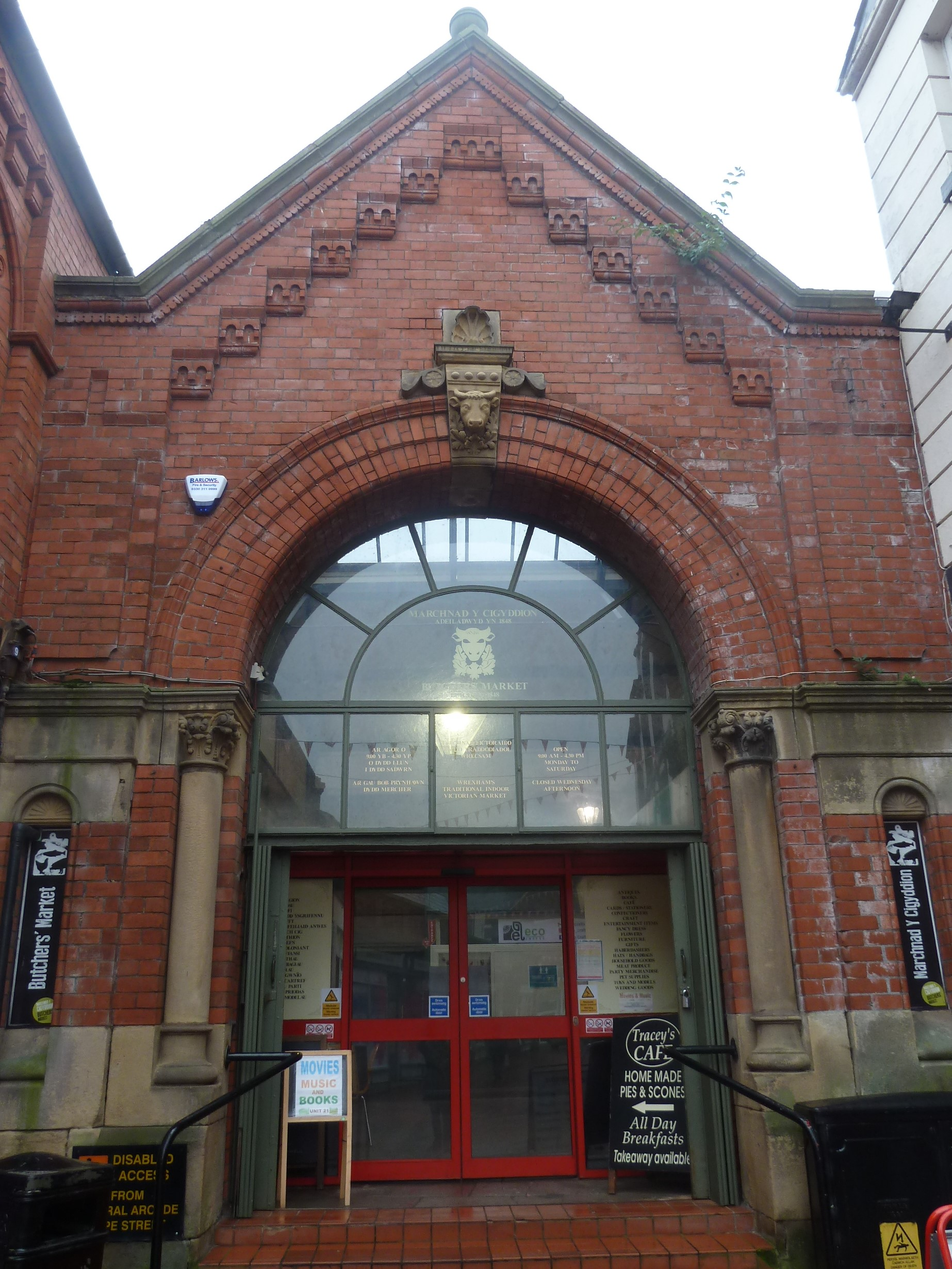
The market's rear entrance on Henblas Street

The market hall was extended in 1879–80, with the rear entrance being added during this period. The rear entrance, in a similar design to the General Market entrance built a year prior, is segmentally arched, with inset stone shafts and foliate capital carrying the arch, with a terracotta bull's head above it. Left of this entrance is a two-storeyed shop (No. 40 Henblas Street) dating from 1880. There is a large room on the building's first floor which was used as a corn exchange, an inn, and additionally to host auction sales and meetings.

The building was designed using known strategies to increase footfall into the building. Critics of the concept of the indoor market at the time had argued it would fail as butchers had always sold their meat on streets, and would have never gone indoors. It was said it took less than half an hour for critics to be proven wrong.

The market has entrances on High Street and Henblas Street. The market can also be accessed from Hope Street through the Central Arcade. It lies within the Wrexham City Centre Conservation Area.

== History ==
The market was built and opened in 1848, and was designed by Thomas Penson. It was the first of the later three indoor markets of Wrexham.

The cellars under the market were used as air raid shelters during World War II. Locals believe these were connected by a tunnel to St Giles' Church.

=== Re-development ===
The council first committed itself to the improvement of the Butchers' and General Markets in 2013, following a decrease in occupancy in Wrexham markets from 90% in 2007 to 70% in 2013. In March 2014, a planning application was submitted to potentially refurbish the interior and exterior of the building, including removing vegetation, masonry cleaning, de-cluttering the façade, and redecorated the shop fronts with new signage. In April 2014, a wider plan for Wrexham's three markets was considered, with the Butchers' Market maintaining its focus on traditional stalls as the other two markets be considered for different purposes.

In May 2016, the council backed a report which proposed a renovation and modernisation of the Butchers' and General Markets. During the redevelopment of the People's Market into Tŷ Pawb, traders from that market, were temporarily rehoused in the Butchers' Market. In May 2019, the council announced it was looking to secure funds from the National Lottery, with a bid asking for £1.5 million, for the re-development of the two markets prioritised.

In February 2020, following a prolonged decrease in visitor numbers and an increase in empty stalls in the market and the adjacent General Market, it was reported that £2 million funding can be secured for the buildings' redevelopment from the Welsh Government, National Lottery and the council budget if the council backed plans to organise such funding. In 2018, Wrexham County Borough Council had set up a taskforce to investigate how to improve the two markets. The Butchers' Market was the main priority of plans, with it having a reported 50% vacancy rate in a 2020 council report. Chair of the taskforce, Councillor Paul Roberts, stated there was a lack of consistency of traders' opening times, reluctant to utilise Wrexham's Night-time economy, and an unattractive market layout to shoppers, with existing traders raising concerns on how any such work would impact their incomes. £2 million in funding was approved by the Welsh Government under its Transforming Towns initiative in March 2022 to the two markets. The plans are hoped to be part of a wider plan to create a "perfect market quarter" in Wrexham, and inspired by similar market redevelopment plans in Chester and Shrewsbury.

During the COVID-19 pandemic in Wales, the market's weekly visitor numbers had decreased from 8,365 per week in 2019 to 4,693 per week by October 2020, a decrease of 43.8 per cent.

In October 2022, plans were submitted for re-developing the market, with local architects Lawray Architects producing the designs. The council stated the market needed essential maintenance, repairs, and modernisation. A redevelopment of the market was proposed as part of the Wrexham Townscape Heritage Scheme using funding from the National Lottery Heritage Fund, the Welsh Government's Transforming Towns Fund, and Wrexham Council's own capital programme. The plans proposed a new attractive fronting to the building's High Street entrance, with a basement under it, new access to upper floors, improve management of interior space, decoration and use of utilities, including toilets and bins, and roof repairs. During the redevelopment works, existing traders were offered to move temporarily to Queens Square.

In January 2023, the redevelopment of the market was approved by the council's planning department. In April 2023, the council admitted there was a slight delay to the refurbishment. It and the General Market, re-opened on 28 November 2024, in conjunction with the local Victorian Christmas Market, with the re-launch having a Victorian theme, reminiscent of its original opening. The historic market bell was rung, while the mayor of Wrexham held a second ceremonial opening.
