= Thomas Penson =

Welsh architect and engineer

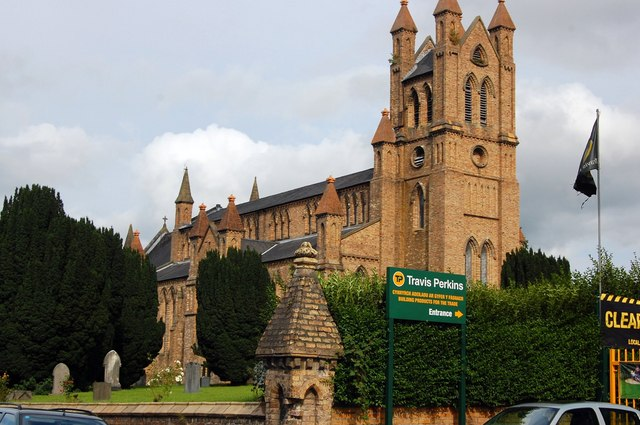
- Church of St David, Newtown by Thomas Penson
- Born: c.1790 Wrexham, Wales
- Died: 20 May 1859 (aged 68–69); Gwersyllt, Denbighshire, Wales
- Education: A pupil of Thomas Harrison of Chester
- Occupation: Architect
- Relatives: Richard Kyrke Penson (son); Thomas Mainwaring Penson (son)
- Buildings: Montgomery Prison, Llanfyllin and Caersws Workhouses, Newtown Flannel Exchange
- Projects: Bridge and road building in Montgomeryshire, town layout in Newtown

Thomas Penson, or Thomas Penson the younger, (c. 1790 – 1859) was the county surveyor of Denbighshire and Montgomeryshire, and an innovative architect and designer of a number of masonry arch bridges over the River Severn and elsewhere.

== Family ==
He was the son of Thomas Penson the elder (c. 1760 – 1824), who had been the county surveyor for Flintshire from 1810 to 1814, but had been dismissed when the bridge at Overton-on-Dee collapsed. Thomas Penson the younger completed its replacement. Thomas Penson the younger had two sons: Thomas Mainwaring Penson (died 1864) and Richard Kyrke Penson (died 1886), both of whom were architects and practised in Chester.

== Training and career ==
Thomas Penson was a pupil of the architect and bridge designer Thomas Harrison of Chester. He became a fellow of the RIBA in 1848 and an associate of the Institution of Civil Engineers in 1839. He was appointed Montgomeryshire county surveyor in 1817, a post in which he continued until 1859.

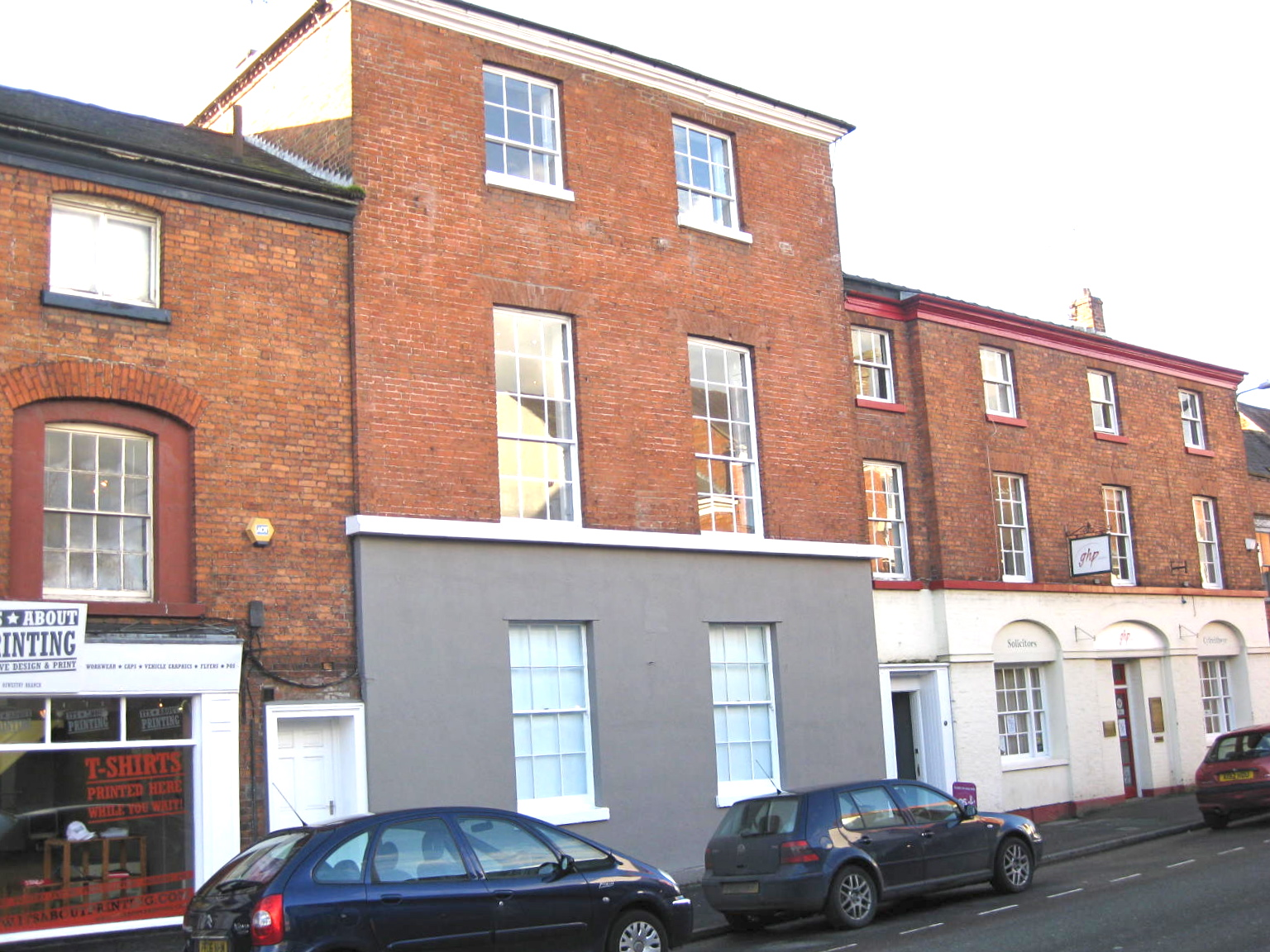
Penson's Chambers, Willow Street, Oswestry

He was also the surveyor for the Montgomeryshire Turnpike Trusts and was responsible for the design of many new roads in the county. He became county surveyor for Denbighshire around 1820. He had married Frances Kirk, daughter of the Wrexham iron master Richard Kirk (1747–1839) in 1814, and at first lived at Overton-on-Dee, but by 1823 he had moved to Oswestry, where he set up his office known as "Penson's Chambers" at 35 Willow Street, while he lived at 19 Willow Street. In 1839, his wife inherited from her father Gwersyllt Hall or Hill near Wrexham, which Penson remodelled in Neo-Jacobean style, and which became their home. Among Penson's pupils were J. W. Poundley, who was to become the Montgomeryshire county surveyor in 1861, and the Welsh poet John Jones (Talhaiarn). Penson was Mayor of Oswestry in 1840.

== Later life ==
Penson and was appointed Deputy Lieutenant of Denbighshire in 1852. He died at Gwersyllt on 20 May 1859.

== Bridges ==
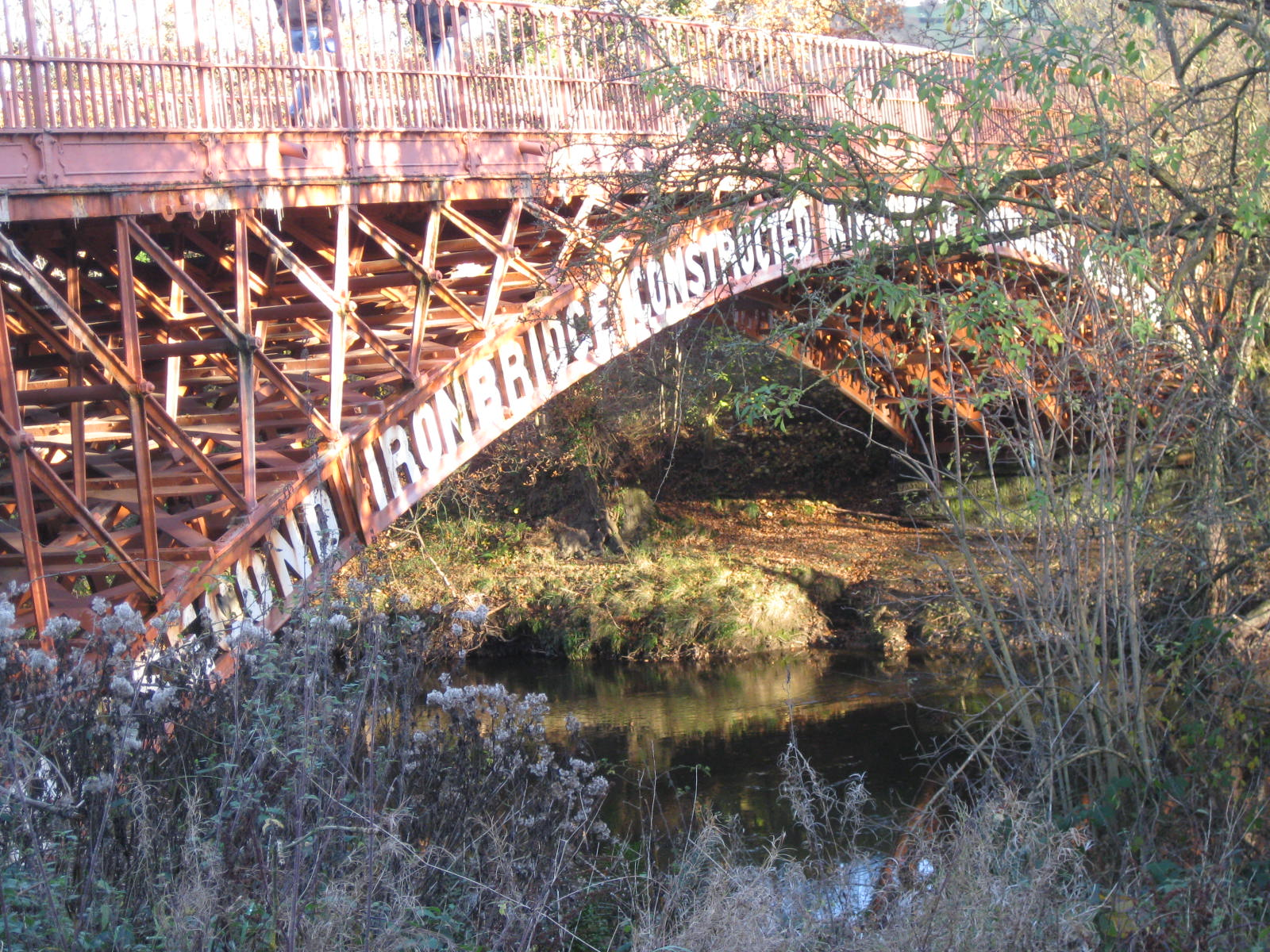
Bridge over the Severn at Abermule

Penson's work as a bridge-builder in Montgomeryshire has been surveyed in detail by C R Anthony, who lists 62 bridges built to Penson's designs in that county. He relied on contractors to build his bridges, such as David Davies, who built the approach roads to Llandinam bridge in 1846. In February 1852, the Severn flooded, damaging a number of bridges for which Penson went on to design replacements. Penson designed a two-span cast iron arch bridge at Caerhowel in 1858 to replace a timber structure destroyed by floods. Against his advice, a suspension bridge designed by James Dredge had been built in 1854, only to collapse four years later under the weight of three lime wagons, killing one man.

Other bridges credited to Thomas Penson include:

- Caersws Bridge, at Caersws, 1821, three elliptical masonry arches
- Long Bridge, at Llanidloes, 1826, three-span masonry arch bridge which replaced a wooden bridge
- Long Bridge, at Newtown, 1827, masonry arch widened by Penson with cast iron arches in 1857
- Felindre Bridge, at Mount Severn, 1848, segmental or elliptical masonry arch bridge
- Short Bridge, at Llanidloes, 1849, masonry arch bridge
- Brynderwen Bridge, at Abermule, 1852, 33m span cast iron arch bridge
- Cilcewydd Bridge, 1861, masonry arch bridge
- New Bridge over the river Dee
- Llanymynech Bridge over the River Vyrnwy.
- Sontly Bridge, Wrexham. Dated 1845. Ironwork cast R & W Jones of the Ruabon Foundry.

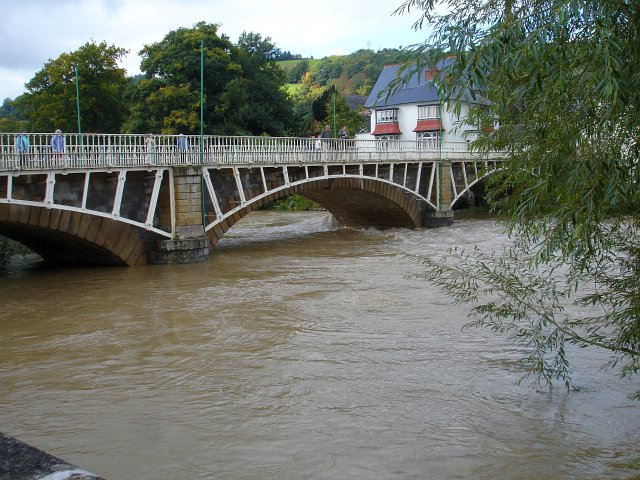
Long Bridge, Newtown By Thomas Penson

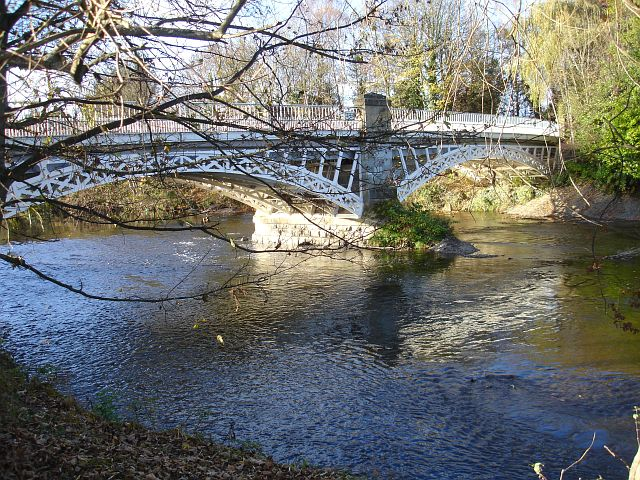
Caerhowel Bridge over the Severn at Brynderwen, Abermule. By Thomas Penson 1858

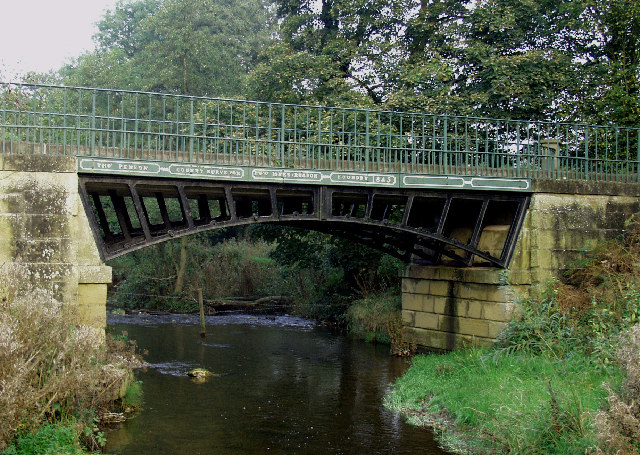
Sontley Bridge near Wrexham Inscription Thos Person: County Surveyor; Jones Ruabon :Foundry 1843

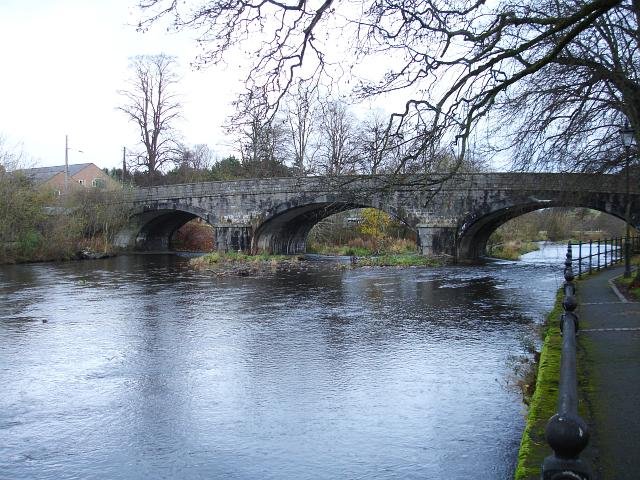
Longbridge, Llanidloes Thomas Penson, 1826

== Architectural style ==
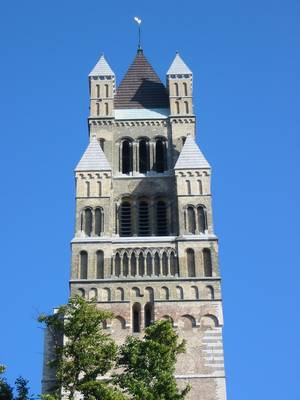
St. Salvator's Cathedral, Bruges, probably used as a model for St David's Newtown

Although a pupil of Thomas Harrison, noted for his use of the Classical and particularly "Grecian" architectural style, this was rarely adopted by Penson. An exception is the once impressive Flannel Market (now Regent Centre) of 1832 at Newtown. For country houses he favoured a Neo-Jacobean style; as at Vaynor, Llanrhaidr Hall and Hill House, Gwersysllt. He also used this style for the Butcher's Market at Wrexham. For churches he adopted an assertive and non-archaeological version of French Romanesque, although St Davids, Newtown, built in brick and terracotta, is also influenced by the North German Brick Gothic. More particularly he seems to be copying Saint Salvator's Cathedral in Bruges, with buff (rather than the normal red) bricks and has pyramid capping on the pinnacles. Saint Salvator's tower had been remodelled by Robert Dennis Chantrell following a fire in 1838, and this may provide a connection with Penson The design is probably also influenced by Pugin's Roman Catholic St Chad's Cathedral, Birmingham, which is a slightly earlier example of Brick Gothic revival. It is Penson's innovative use of terracotta at Christ Church, Welshpool that is of particular interest. Christ Church (1839–44) was commissioned by the Earl of Powis and is possibly the earliest example of the terracotta revival in Britain. In this church moulded brownish yellow bricks and terracotta were used for the Romanesque arches of the nave and for the apsidal vaulting of the chancel ceiling

Penson was an early and leading exponent of Romanesque Revival architecture and he developed a distinctive style based on the French Romanesque and the earlier Romanesque of the German and Flemish Brick Gothic. He built at least six churches in this style. Romanesque Revival architecture had been introduced in Wales by Thomas Hopper’s "Neo-Norman" or "Norman revival" designs for Penrhyn Castle, which were executed between 1822 and 1837. The style of Romanesque adopted by Penson contrasts with the Italianate Romanesque of other architects such as Thomas Henry Wyatt, who designed Saint Mary and Saint Nicholas Church in this style at Wilton, Wiltshire, built between 1841 and 1844.

The source for Penson’s terracotta appears to have been the brickworks associated with the Oswestry coalfield between Trefonen and Morda which were to come into the ownership of the railway engineer Thomas Savin. Terracotta was being promoted as cheaper alternative to costly carved stonework for decorative work on churches. The terracotta was produced by casting, which was then fired. Similar designs on the columns and arches can be seen on the porch of the Llangedwyn church and Llanymynech, and these are presumably designs prepared by Penson.

Churches and terracotta detailing
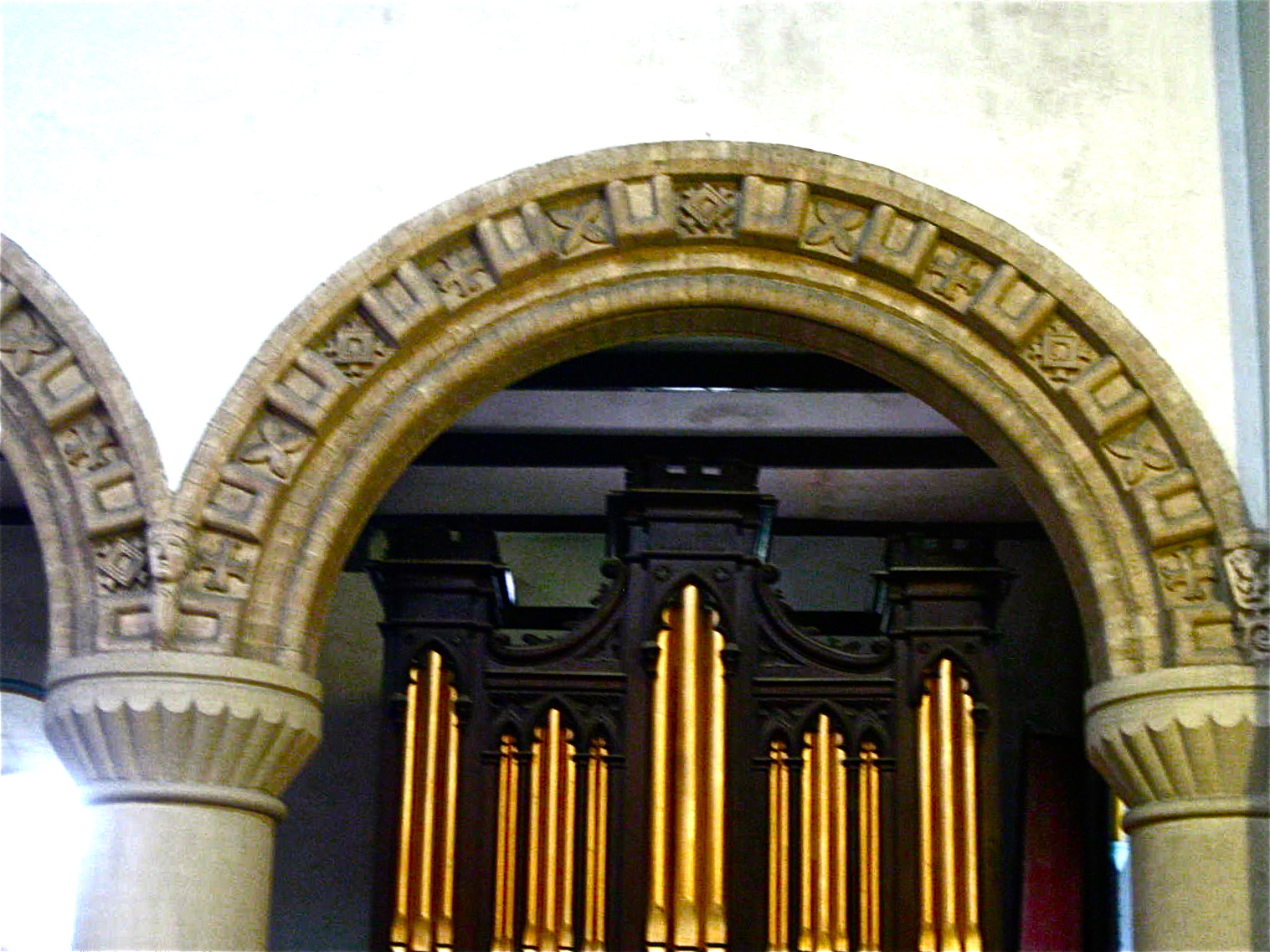
Christ Church, Welshpool. Terracotta Romanesque revival arch

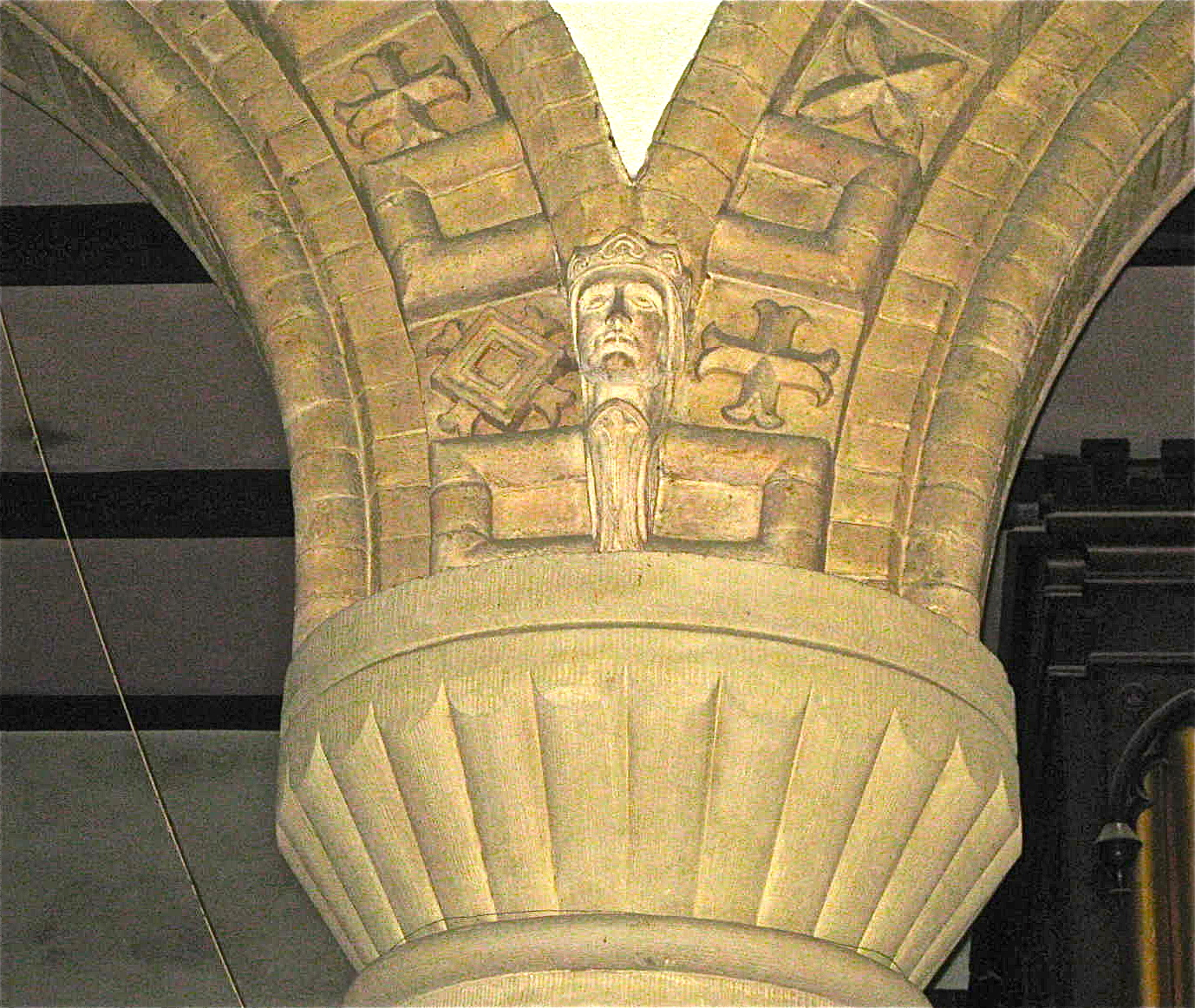
Christ Church, Welshpool. Terracotta detailing on the arch above the limestone Romanesque revival column capital

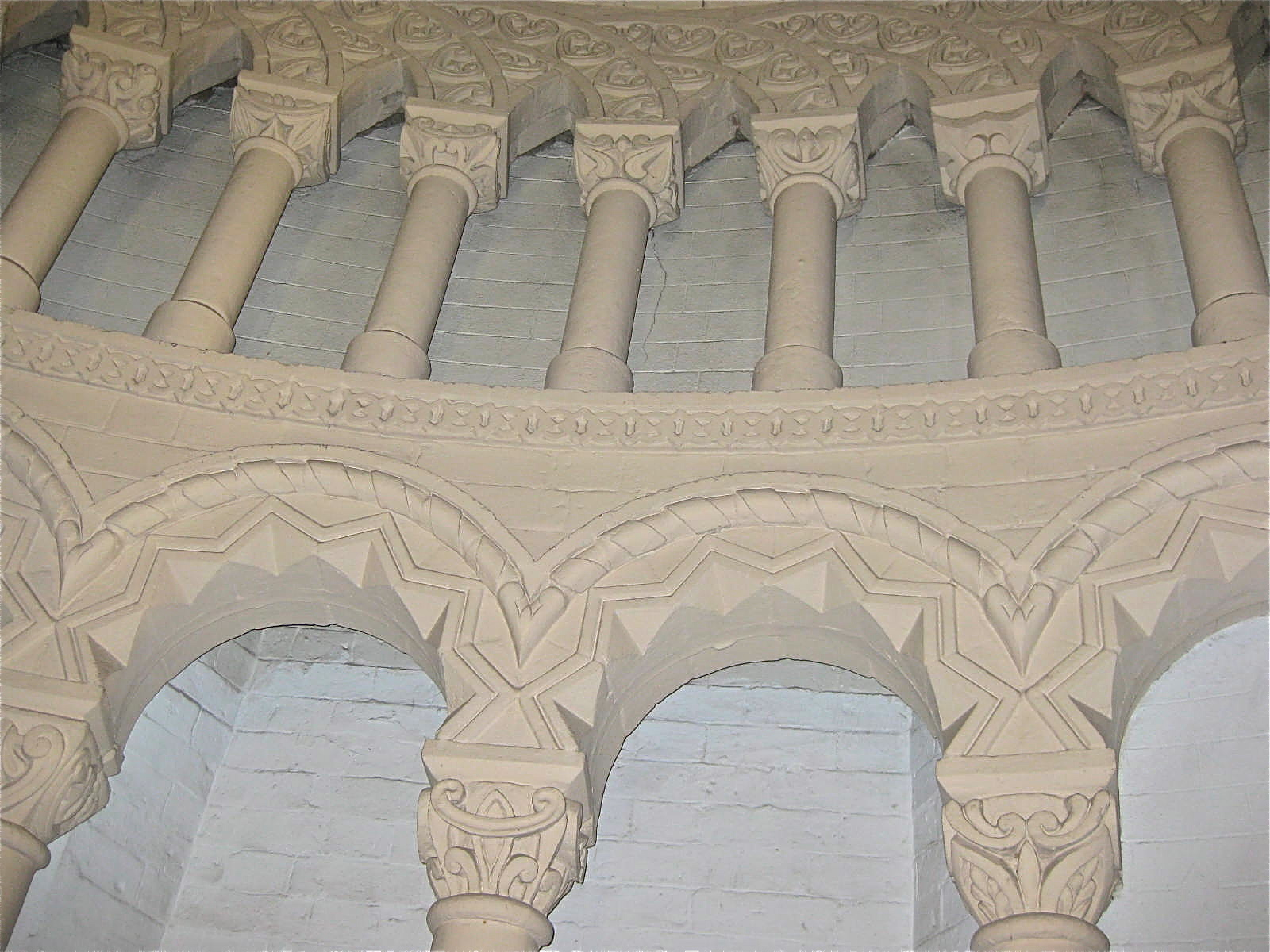
Christ Church, Welshpool. Chancel arcade in apse behind altar

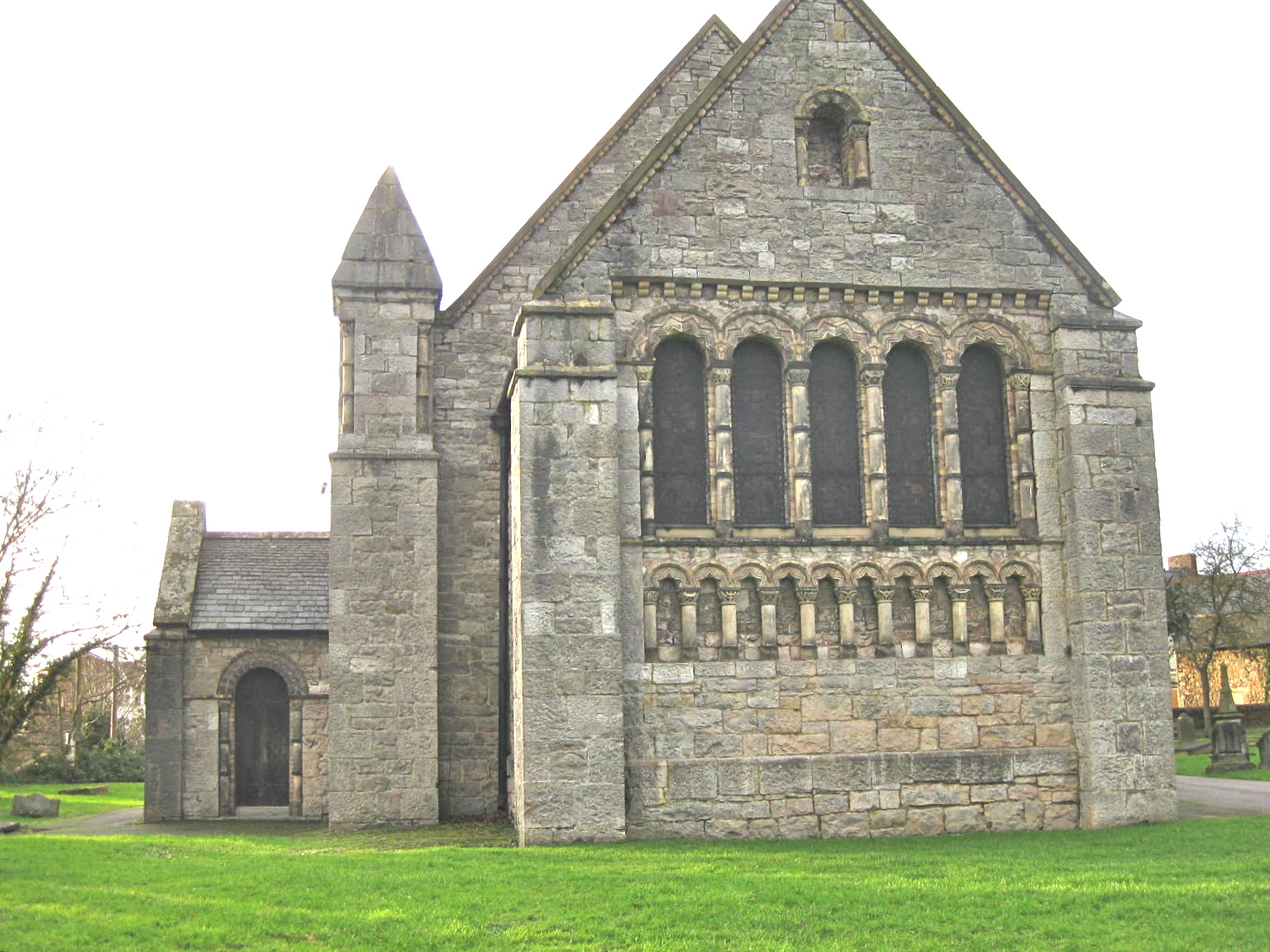
Church of St Agatha, Llanymynech

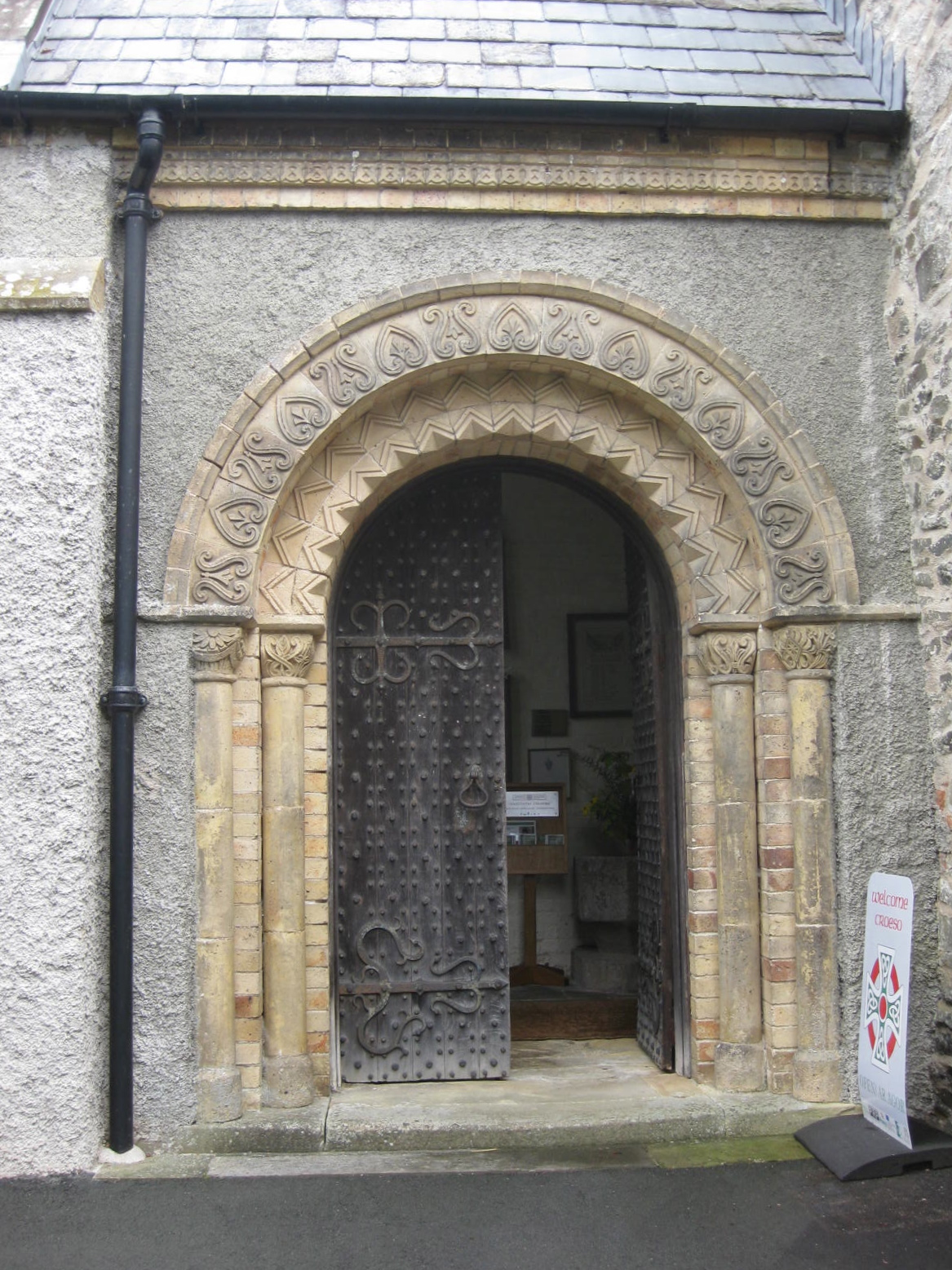
St Cedwyn, Llangedwyn. Romanesque Revival west porch

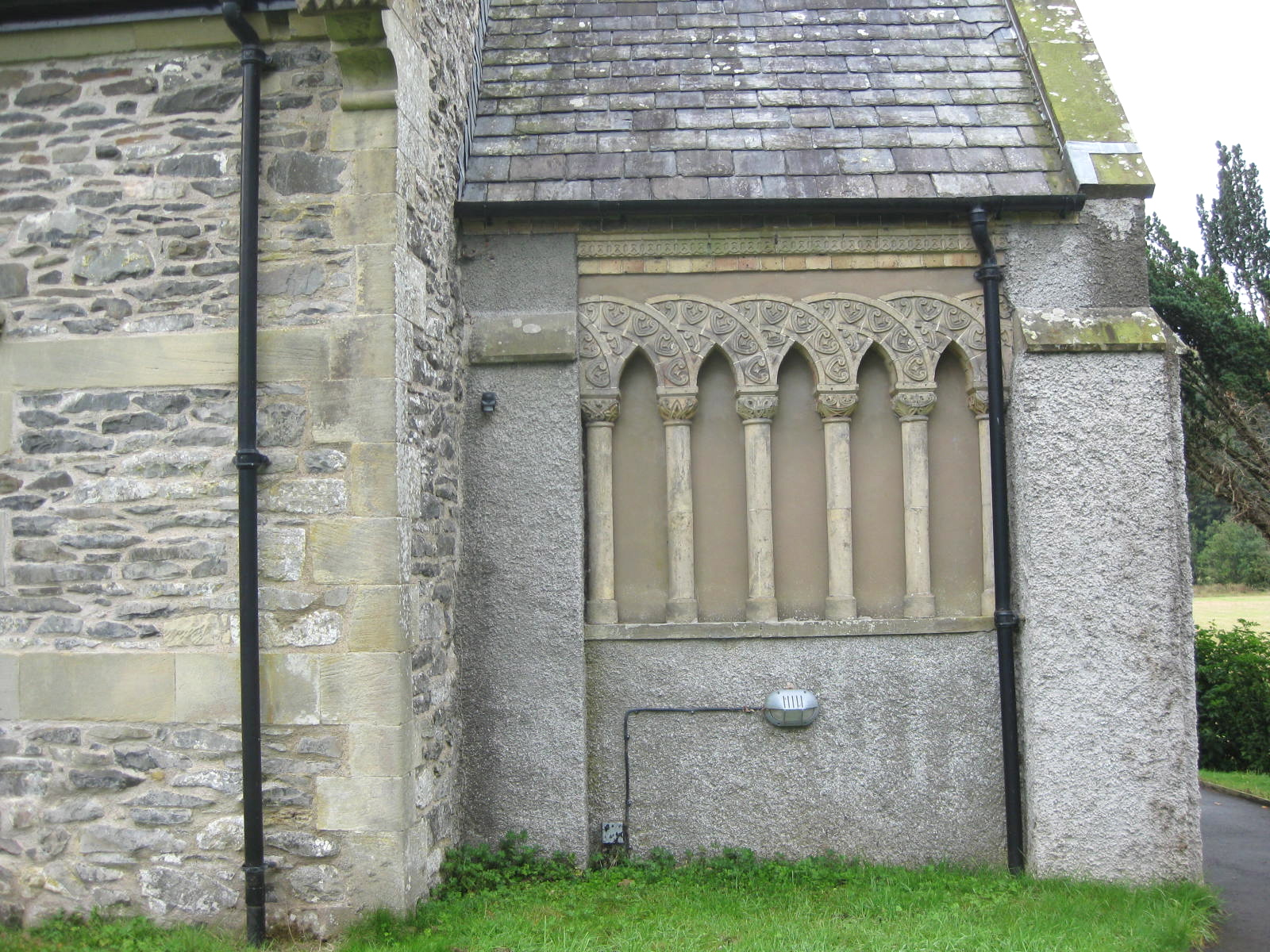
St Cedwyn, Llangedwyn. Romanesque Revival terracotta arcade.

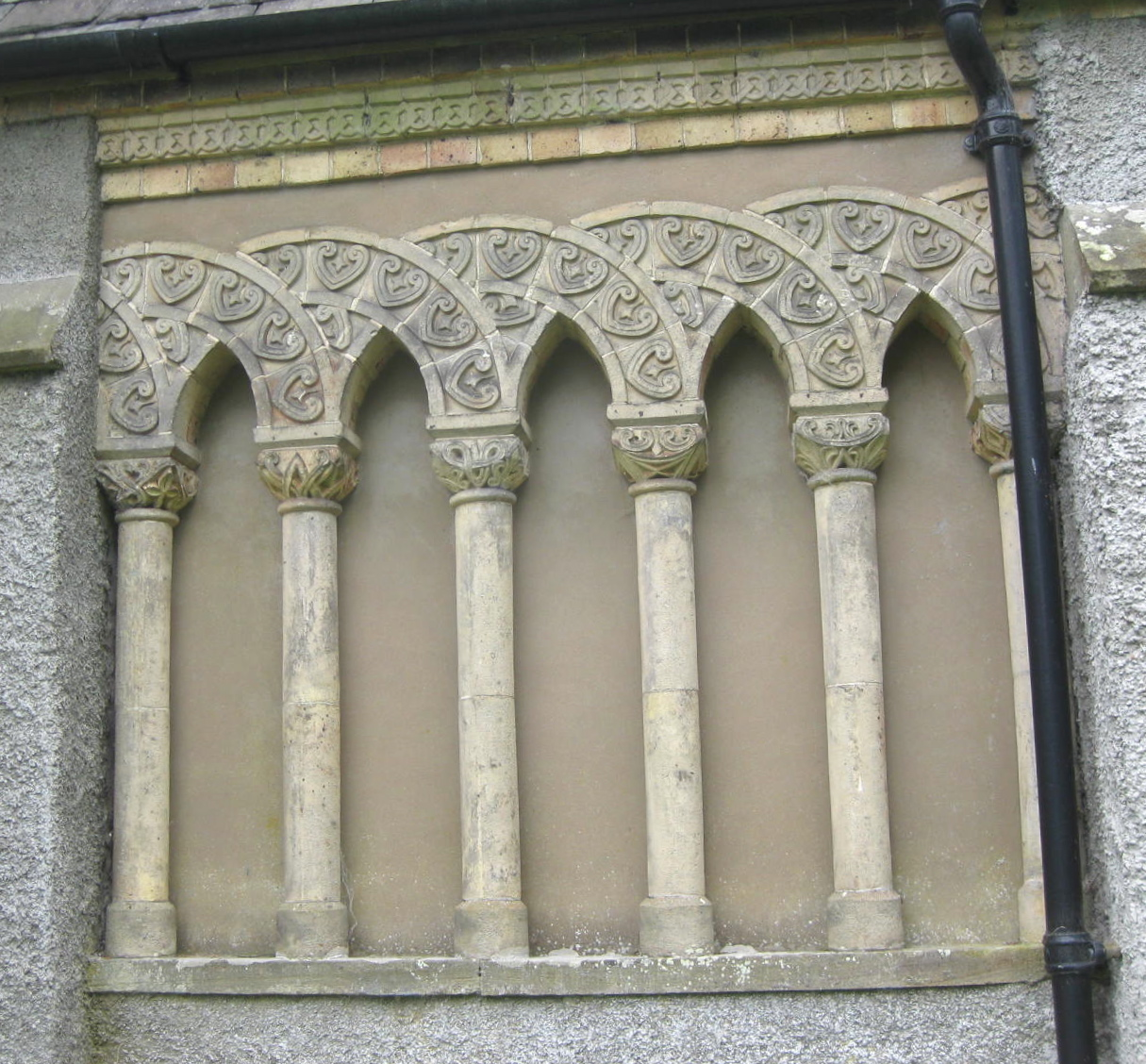
St Cedwyn, Llangedwyn. Romanesque Revival terracotta arcade.

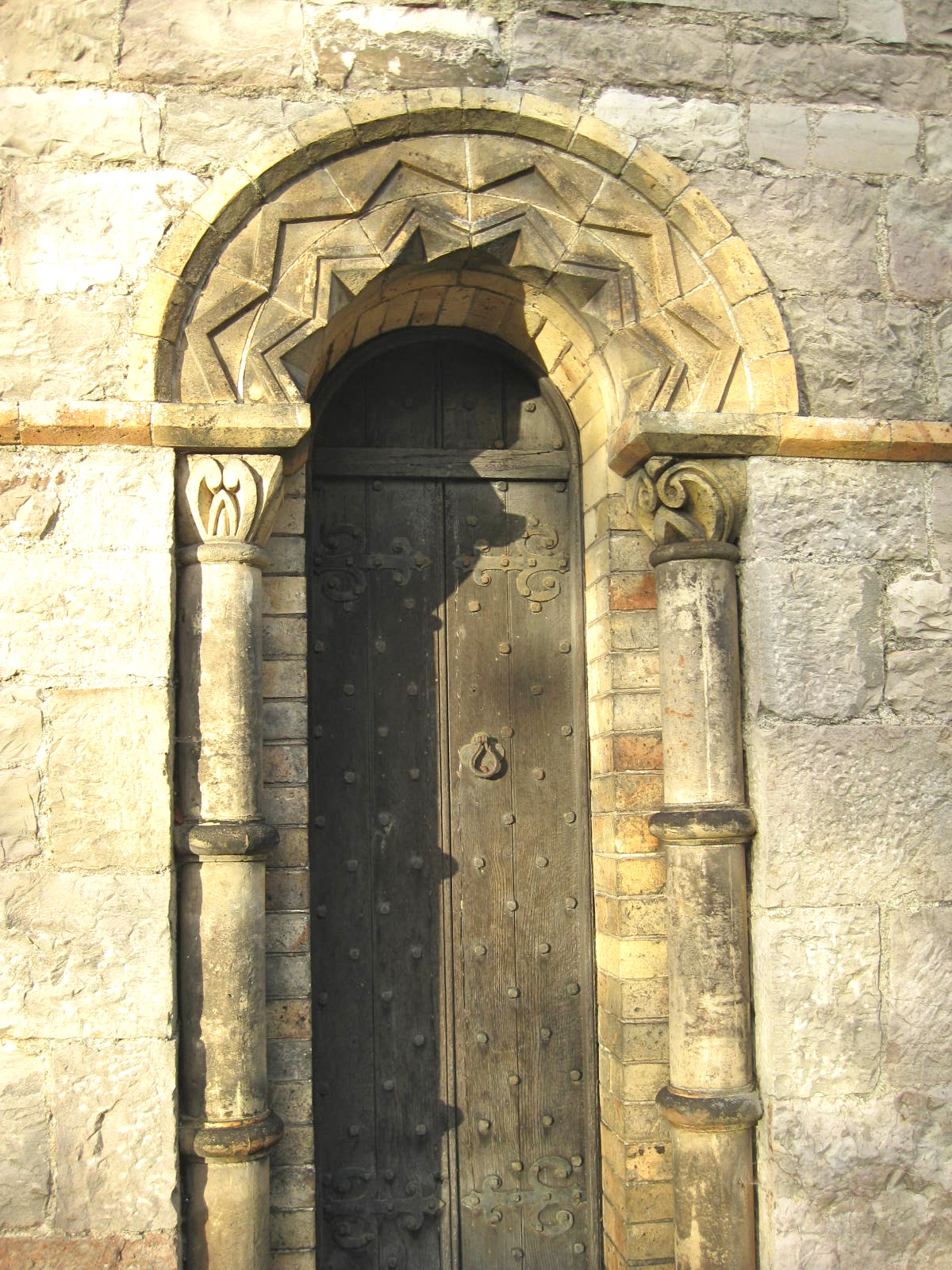
Church of St Agatha, Llanymynech

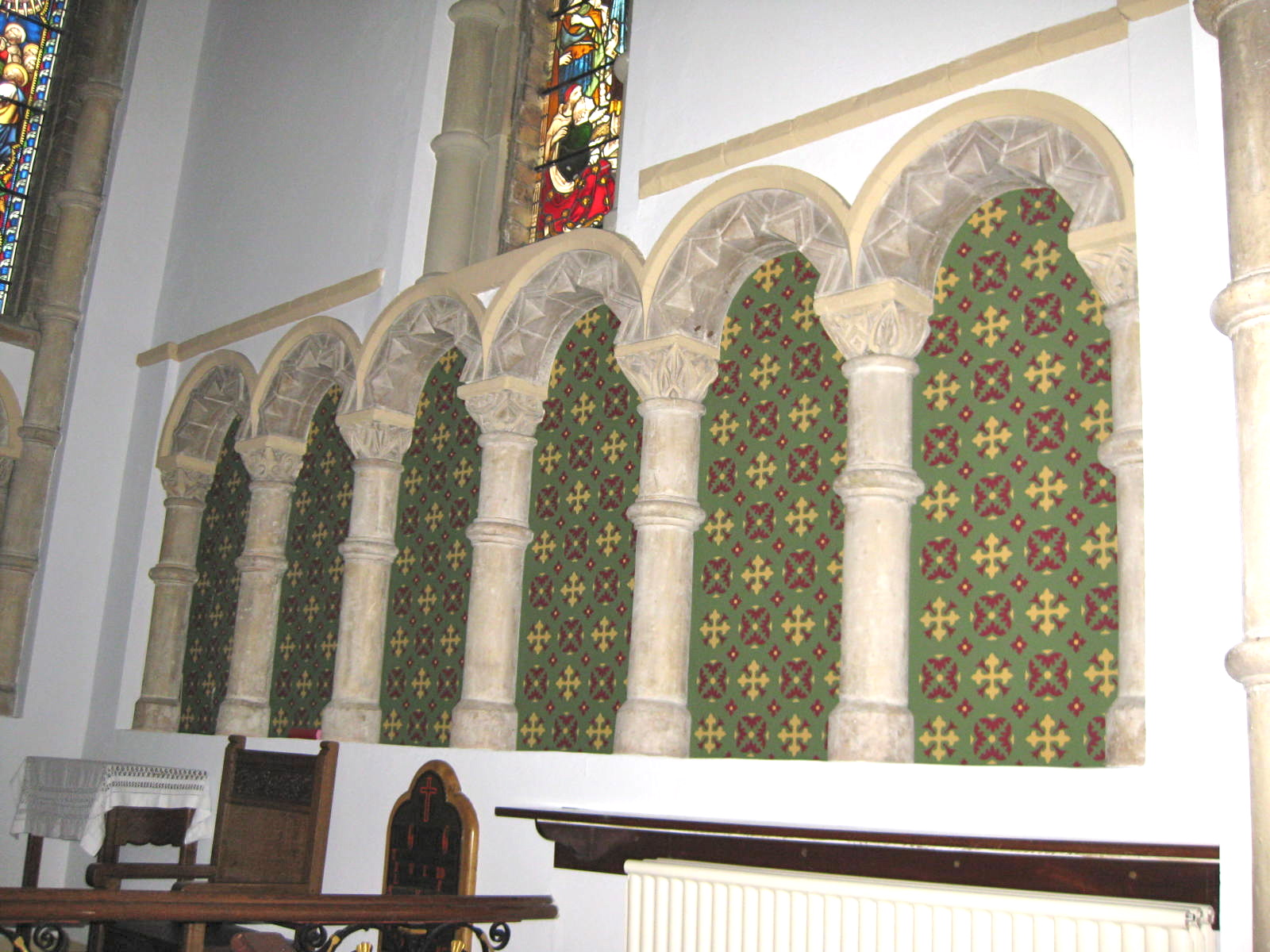
Church of St Agatha, Llanymynech

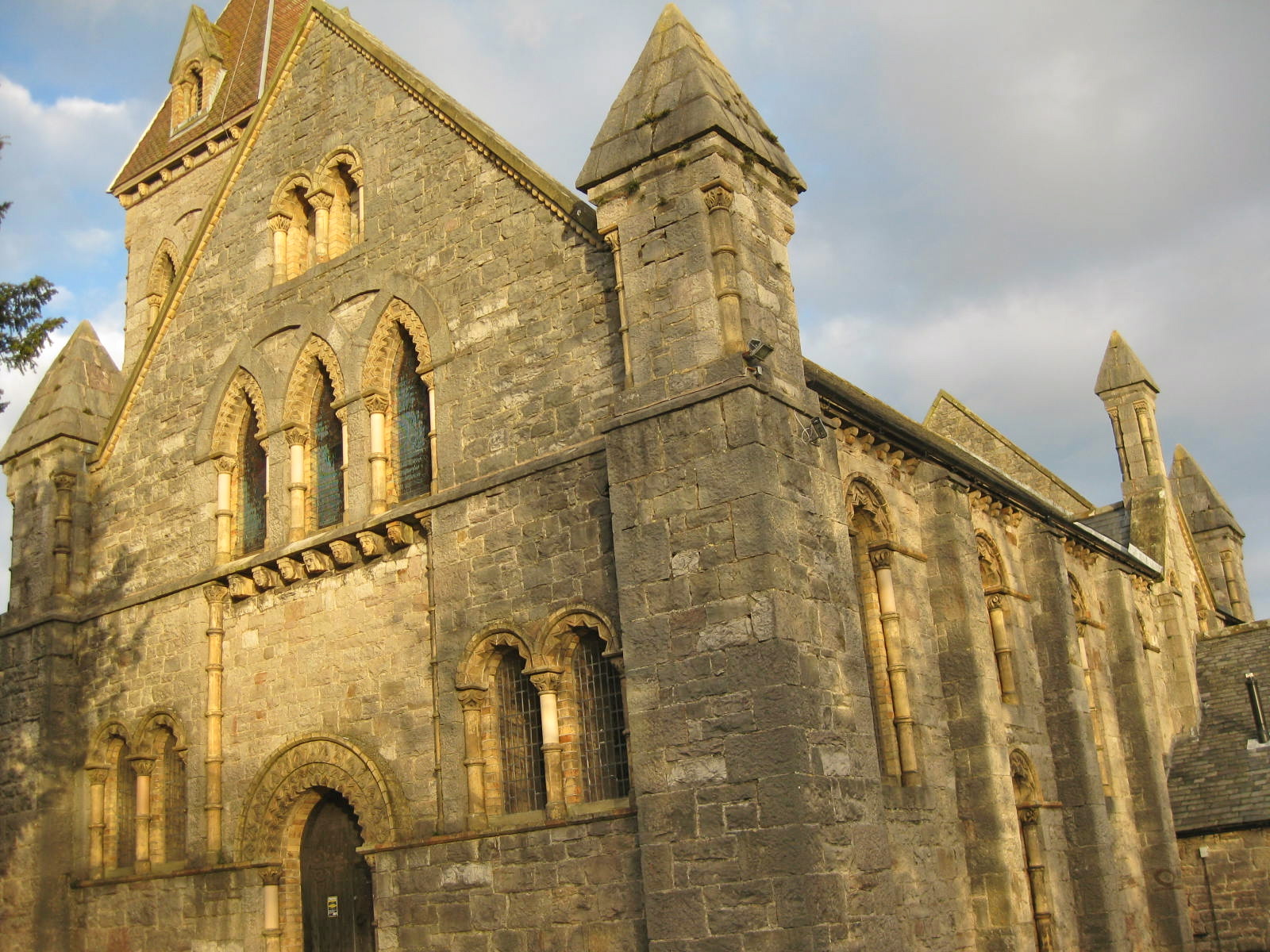
Church of St Agatha, Llanymynech

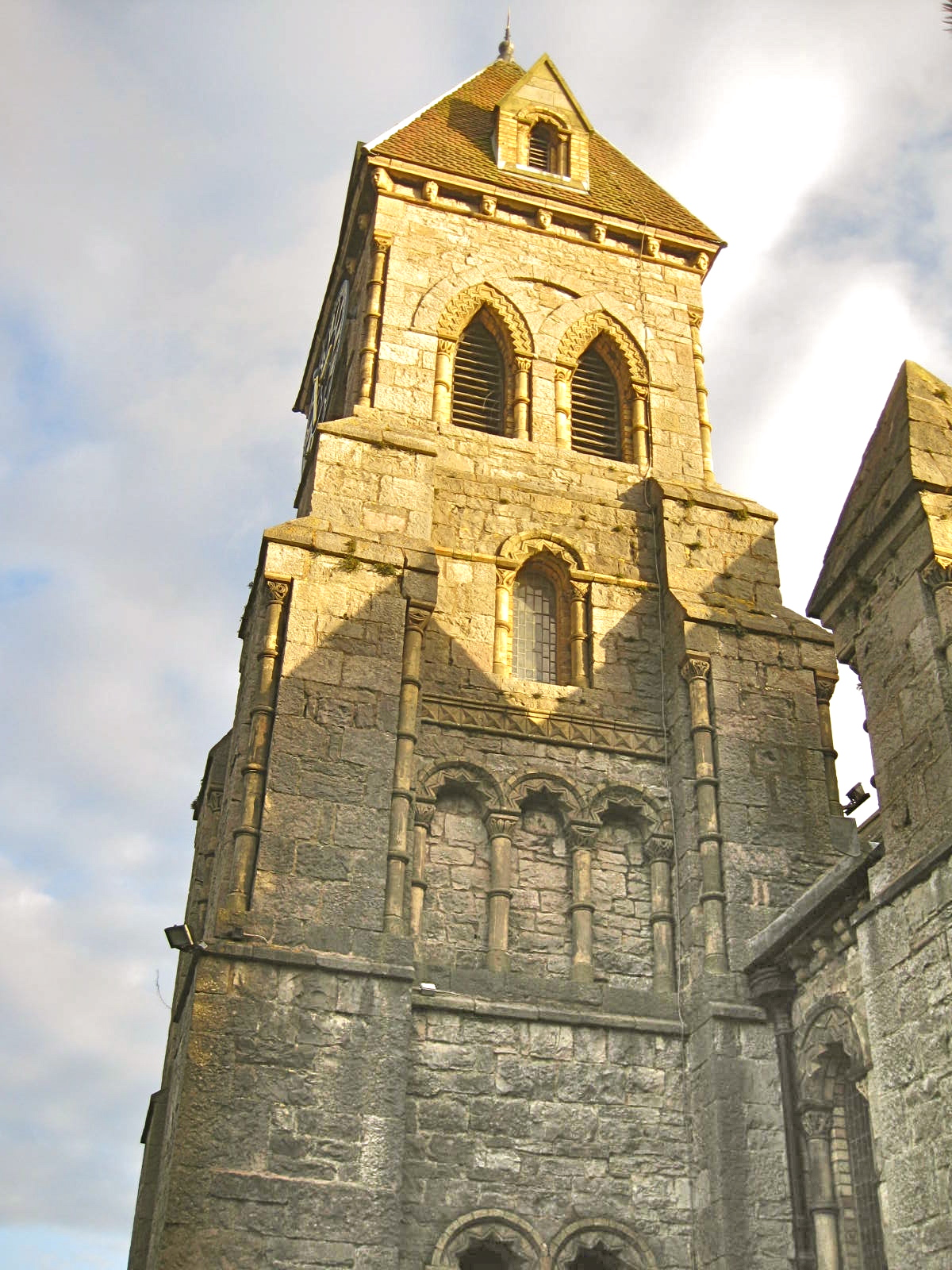
Church of St Agatha, Llanymynech

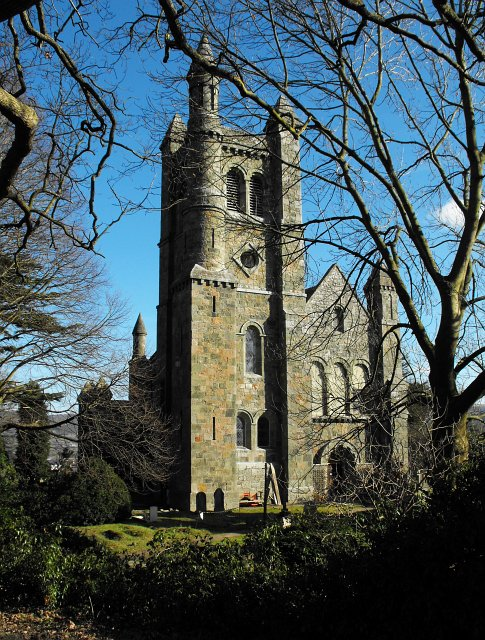
Christ Church, Welshpool

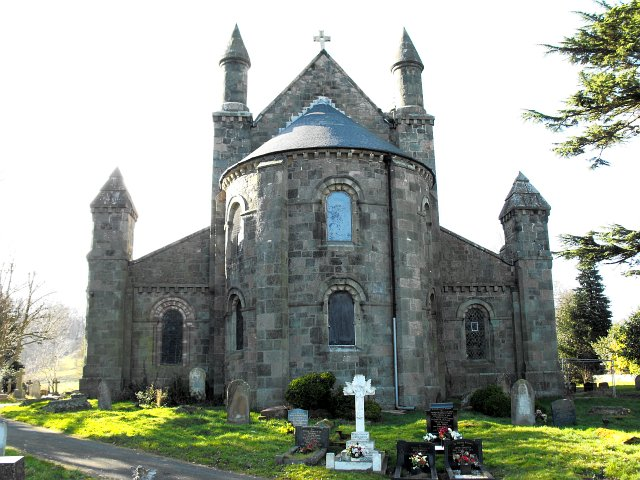
Christ Church, Welshpool

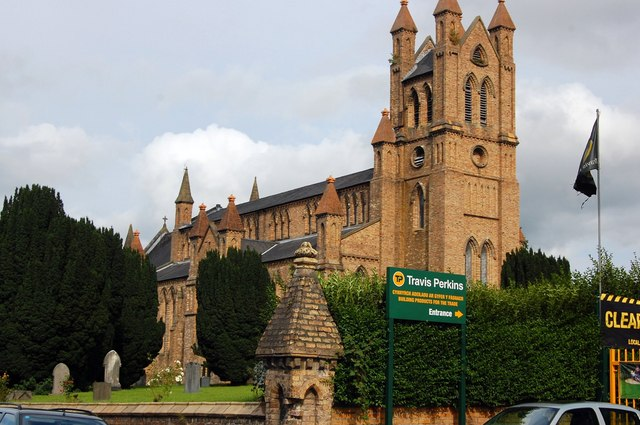
Church of St David, Newtown by Penson

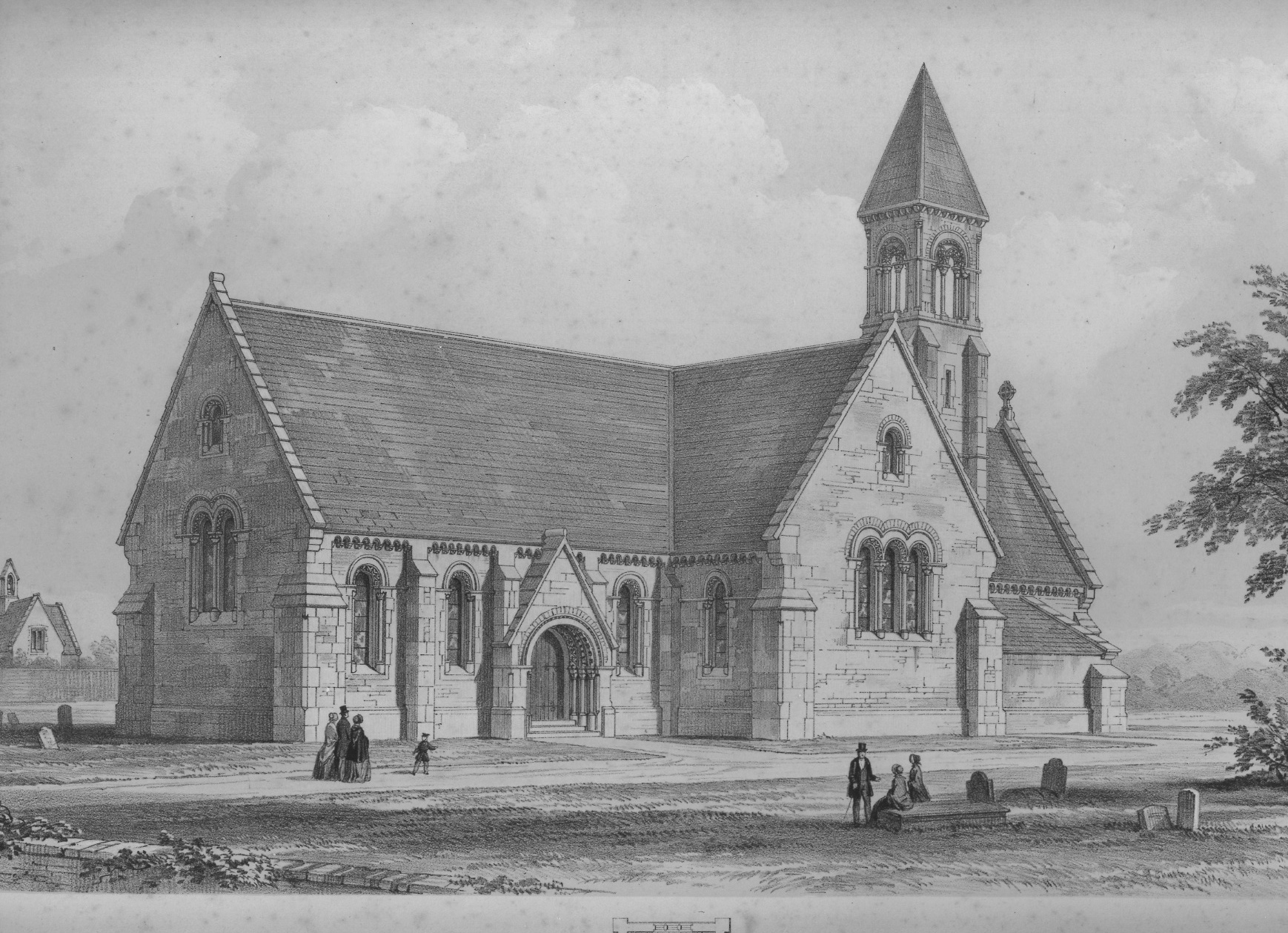
Rhosllanerchruggog Church erected 1852 from designs by Penson

=== Churches ===
- Holy Trinity, Oswestry, Salop Street. 1835–7. Much altered by Eustace Frere in 1893–4, who added the tower and spire. Penson's church was much plainer with lancet windows and crocketed pinnacles on the nave parapet.
- St David's Denbigh. A Commissioner's Church. The tower was completed in 1858, while the nave was pulled down and rebuilt later.
- Christ Church, Welshpool 1839–1844.
- St David's Newtown 1843–47. A Commissioner's Church.
- St Agatha's Llanymynech, Shropshire, 1845
- St Cedwyn, Llangedwyn, Penson added a porch with Romanesque decorative terracotta in the 1840s.
- Holy Trinity, Gwersyllt, Wrexham 1850–51
- Rhosllanerchrugog, Wrexham 1852

=== Public buildings ===
- Llanfyllin Union Workhouse, 1838, workhouse for 250 paupers
- Newtown & Llanidloes Union Workhouse at Caersws, 1838–40
- The Flannel Exchange, Newtown, 1832
- Newtown, High Street. If this is correct, these buildings were completely replaced by Walker.
- The Montgomeryshire County Gaol, Montgomery
- Montgomery Town Hall – upper storey rebuilt in 1828 to provide more spacious accommodation for the quarter sessions
- Oswestry The Cross Market, 1848–9.
- Oswestry The Powis Market, Bailey Head
- Wrexham. The Butcher's Market, Wrexham 1848
- Wrexham. The Militia Barracks (now Wrexham Museum), Regent Street. Built for the Denbighshire Militia Regiment as a barracks in 1857 by Penson. Built from Cefn sandstone. The barracks moved to a new headquarters on Kingsmill Road in 1877 and the Regent Street premises were converted into a police station and law court. The police vacated the premises in 1976 and the courts in 1977 following the completion of their new buildings in Bodhyfryd. The building then served as part of the art college for twenty years before being taken over as Wrexham Museum in 1996.

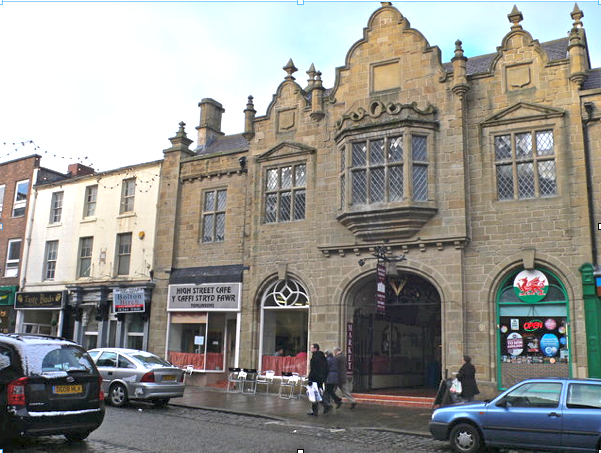
The Butchers Market, Wrexham by Thomas Penson

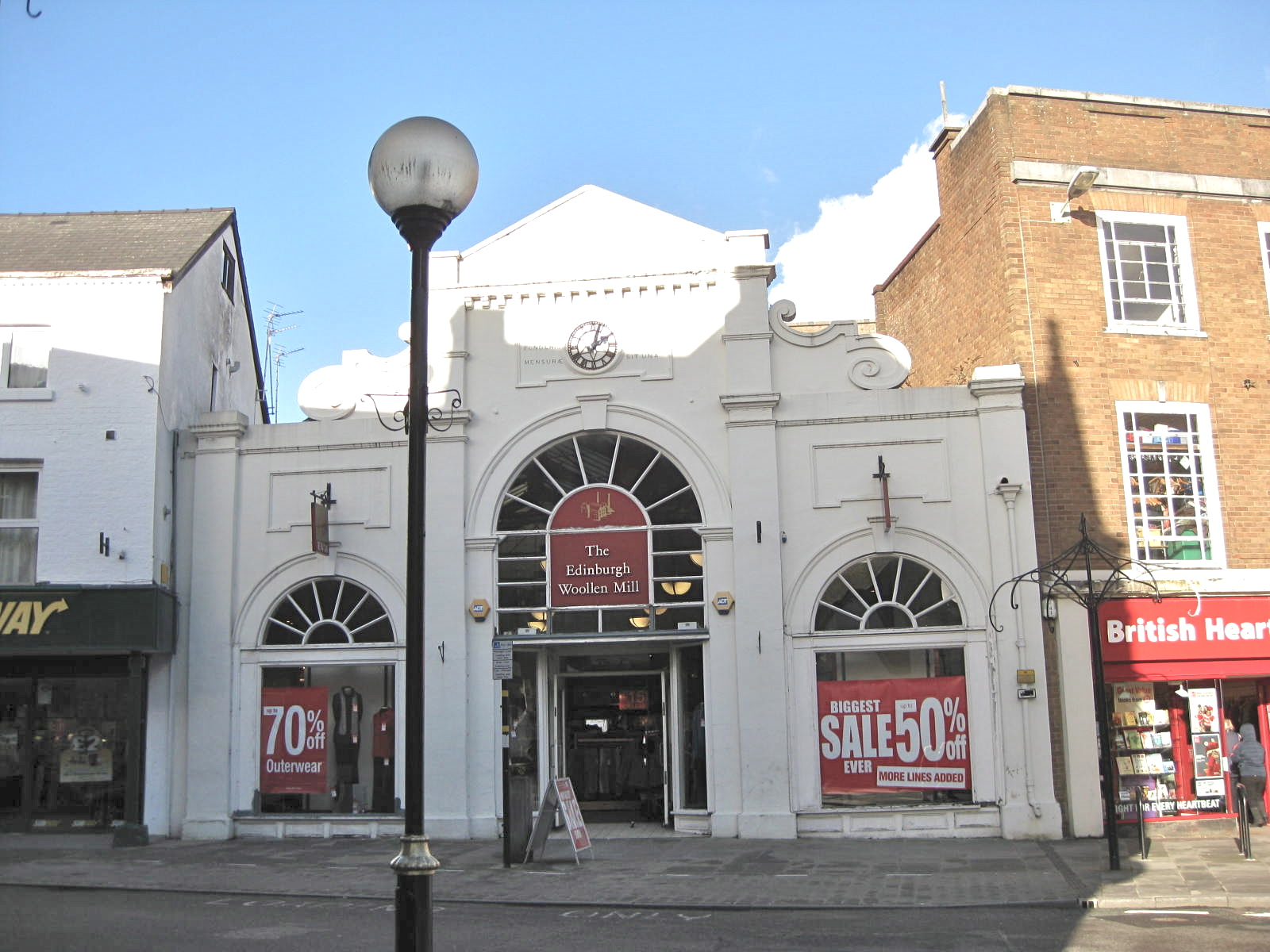
Cross Market, Oswestry.

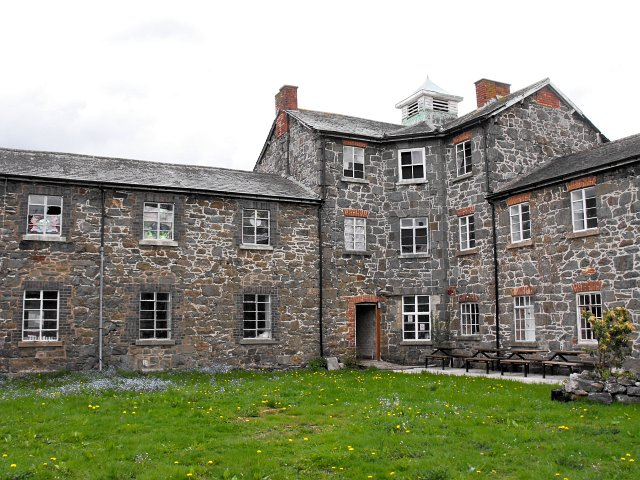
Llanfyllin Workhouse

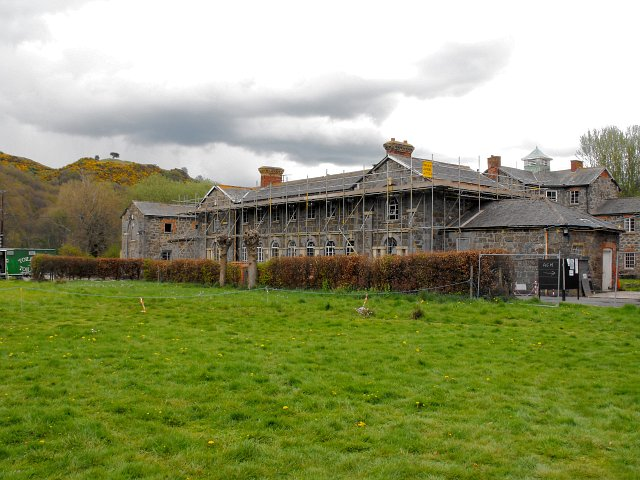
Llanfyllin Workhouse

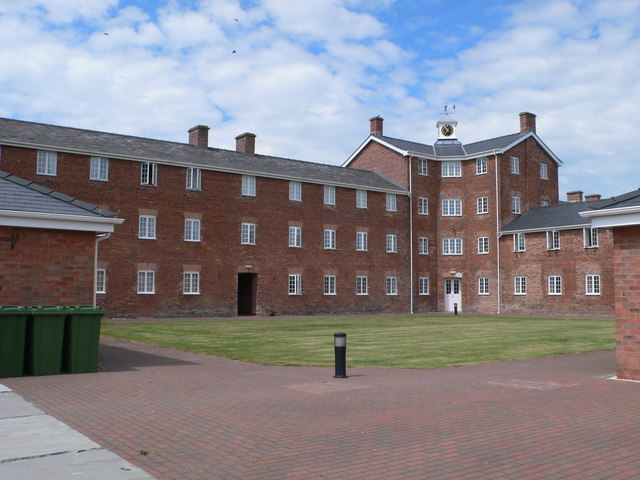
Plas Maldwyn, Caersws. Former Workhouse by Thomas Penson

=== Schools ===
- Gwersyllt, Church School.
- Llanwnnog National School, 1850,
- Newtown National School, Canal Road, 1857
- Newtown National School, Kerry Road (Opposite Railway Station) 1843–7. Now demolished.
- Welshpool National School, Berriew Road. 1821. Now demolished.
- Wrexham, British School, 1844.
- Oswestry National School, Park Avenue 1841.

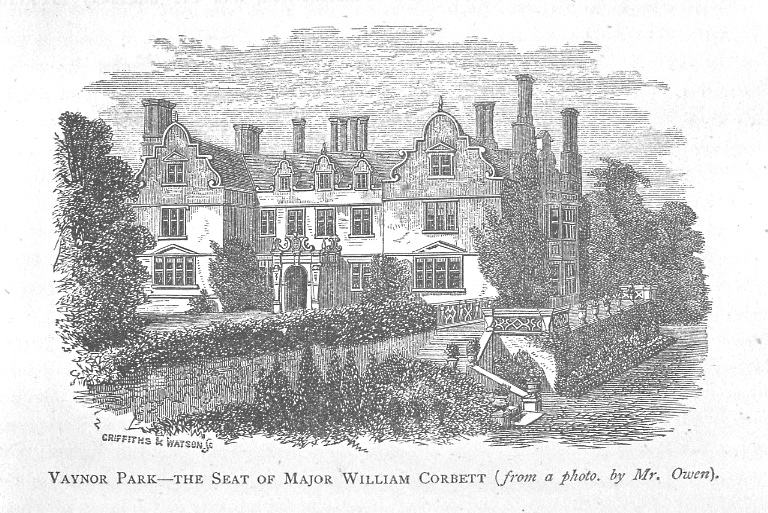
Vaynor, Berriew, as remodelled by Thomas Penson

=== Houses ===
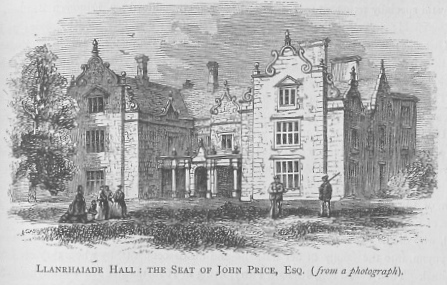
Llanrhaidr Hall, Powys. 1842 From Nicholls "Annals and Antiquities of Wales1872. Vol 1, 375

- Aberhafesp Old Rectory 1828–29.
- Pentreheylin, Fourcrosses. Brick, Neo-Jacobean House, built for John James Turner c1830.
- Vaynor Park, Berriew, Montgomeryshire. Neo-Jacobean alterations to existing brick house for J Lion Winder 1840–53.
- Llandyssil Rectory, Montgomeryshire 1858. Alterations to interior, new brick wing and two bay windows
- Llanrhaiadr Hall, Denbighshire for W Price, 1842.
- Gwersyllt Hall or Hill. Penson's own house. Neo-Jacobean, dated 1841.

=== Penson and the Cottage Ornée village at Berriew ===
In the late 1830s, at the same time as Penson was working on remodelling Vaynor Park in Berriew for John Winder Lion-Winder, he is believed to have been remodelling and building houses in Berriew for the Vaynor estate. As a result of this work Berriew developed as a village with many attractive Cottage Ornée houses. Some of these were rebuilt from earlier timber framed buildings, while others were built in a Tudor Revival style and are some of the earliest examples of Black-and-white Revival architecture. Penson’s style can be recognised by the massive brick chimney stacks which have been added to the houses, the ornamental bargeboards to the gables and in some cases the black and white painting on the brick work to give the impression of timber framing. Penson appears to be an important innovator in developing rural Tudor picturesque architecture and his son Thomas Mainwaring Penson further developed Black-and-white Revival architecture from 1852 onwards in Chester. A pupil of his John Wilkes Poundley, also built estate housing in the cottage ornée style for Naylor Estates at Leighton Hall and Kerry in Montgomeryshire.

Cottage ornée village at Berriew
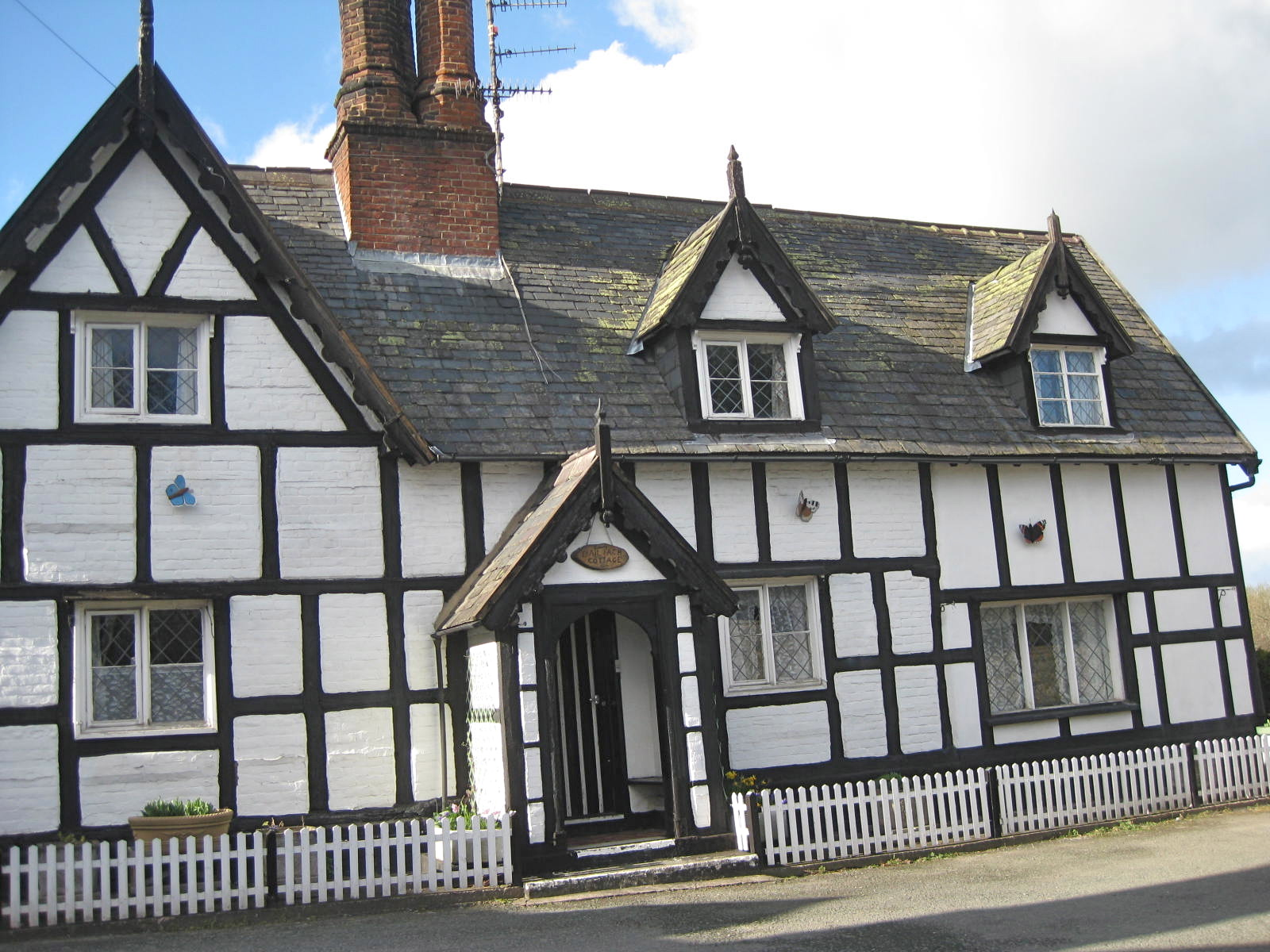
Berriew, Montgomeryshire. Vaynor Estate Cottge, Refail.

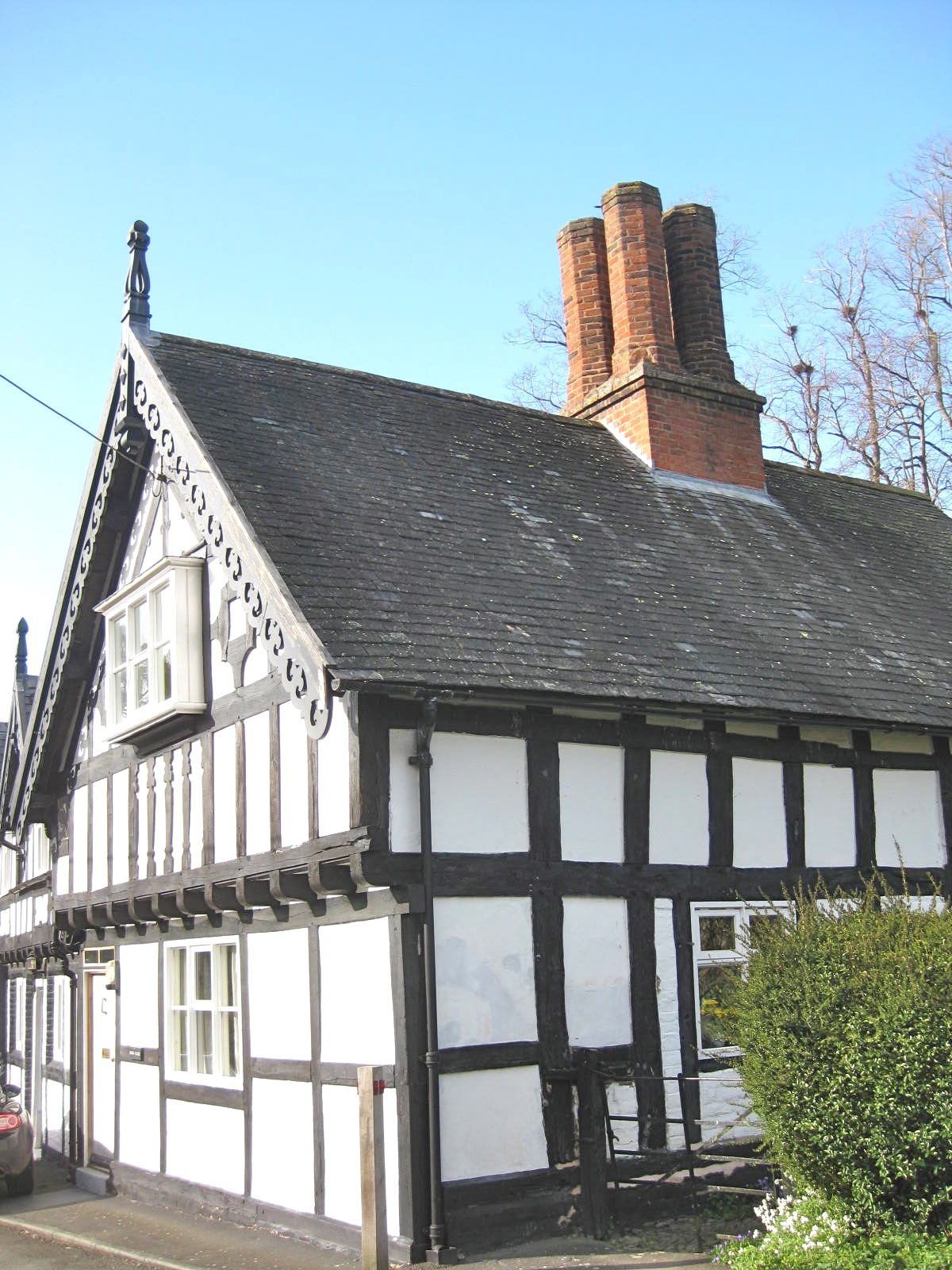
Berriew, Montgomeryshire. Church Terrace

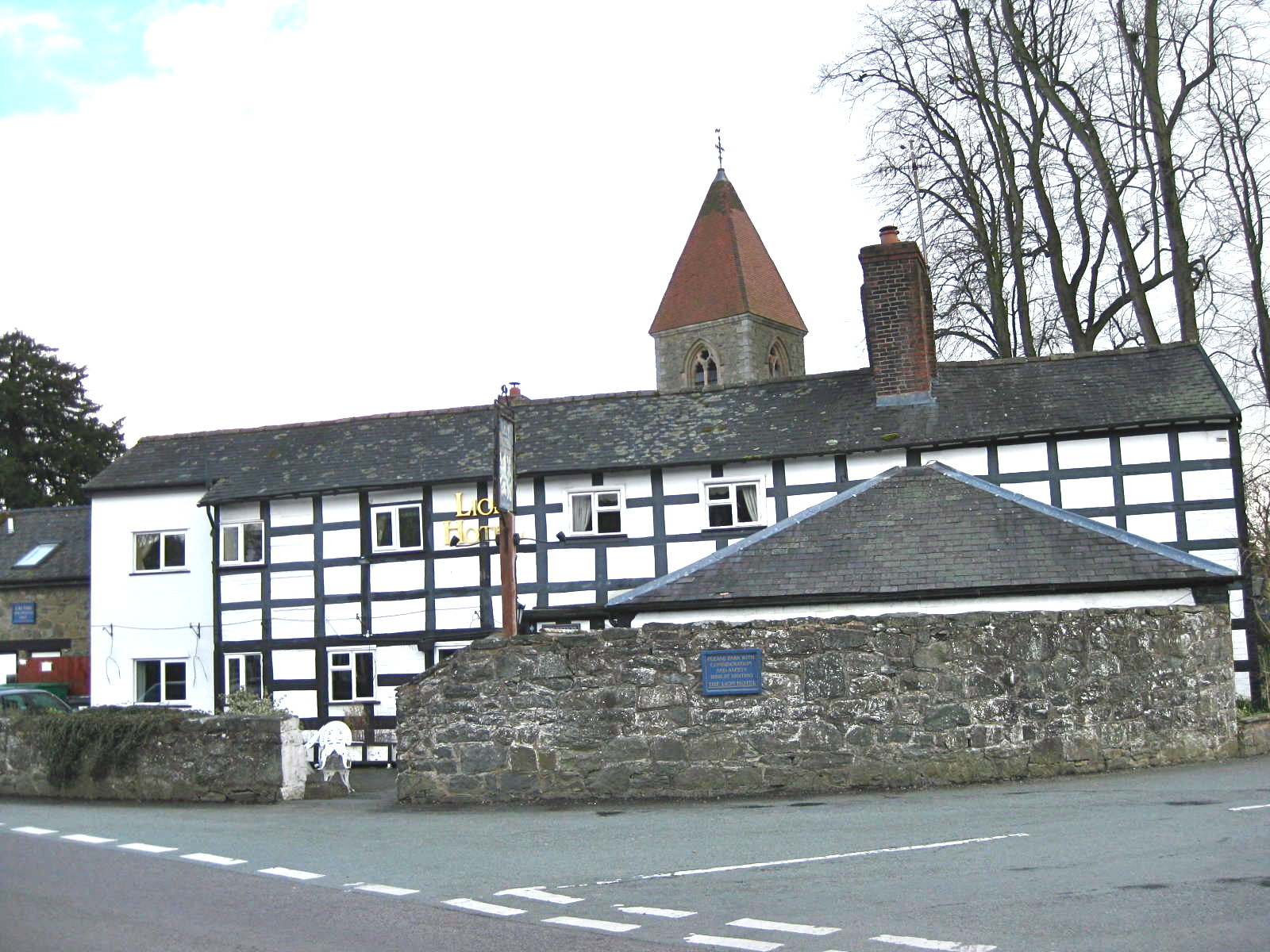
Berriew, Montgomeryshire. Cottages by Church

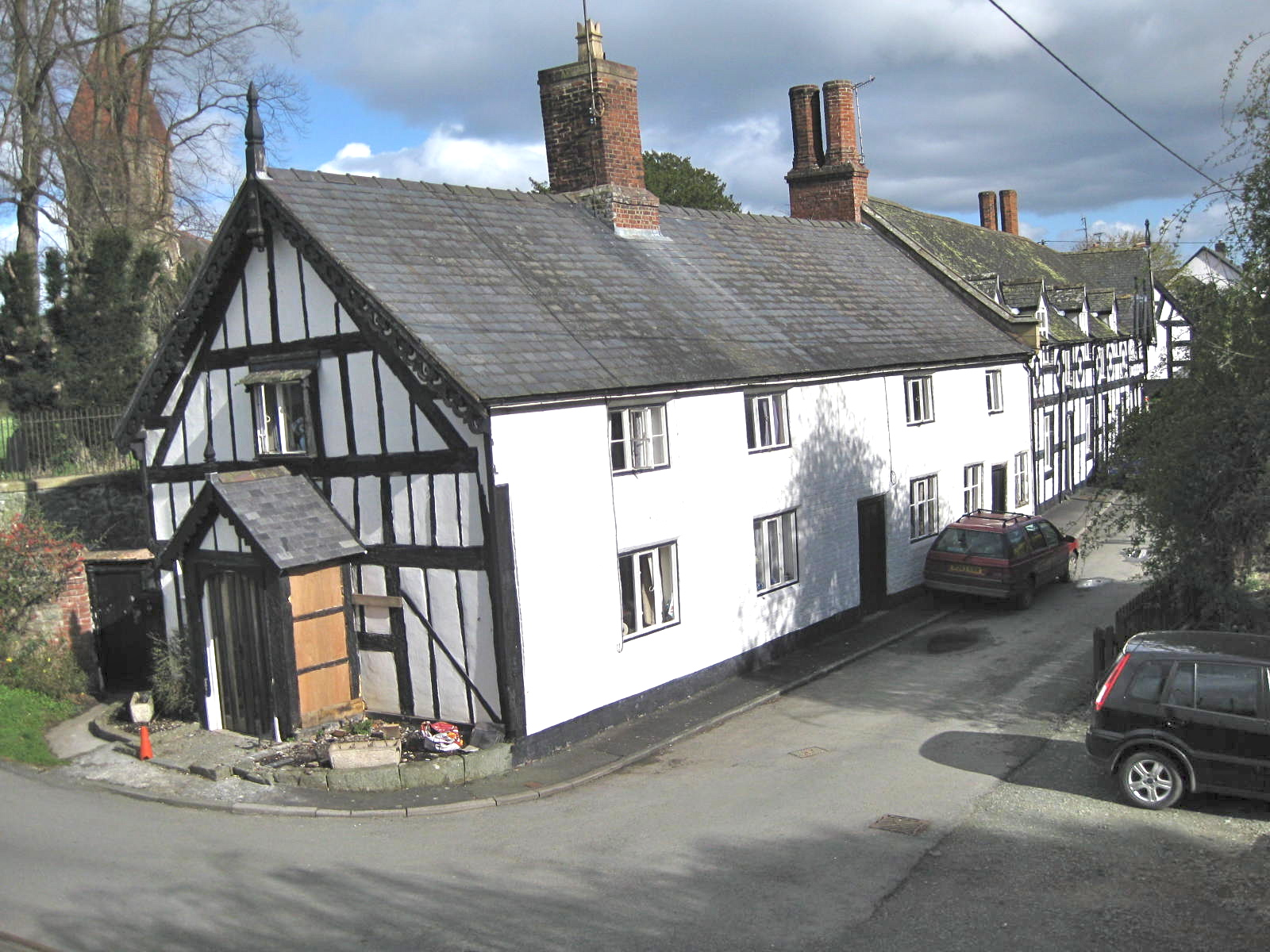
Berriew, Montgomeryshire. Church Terrace

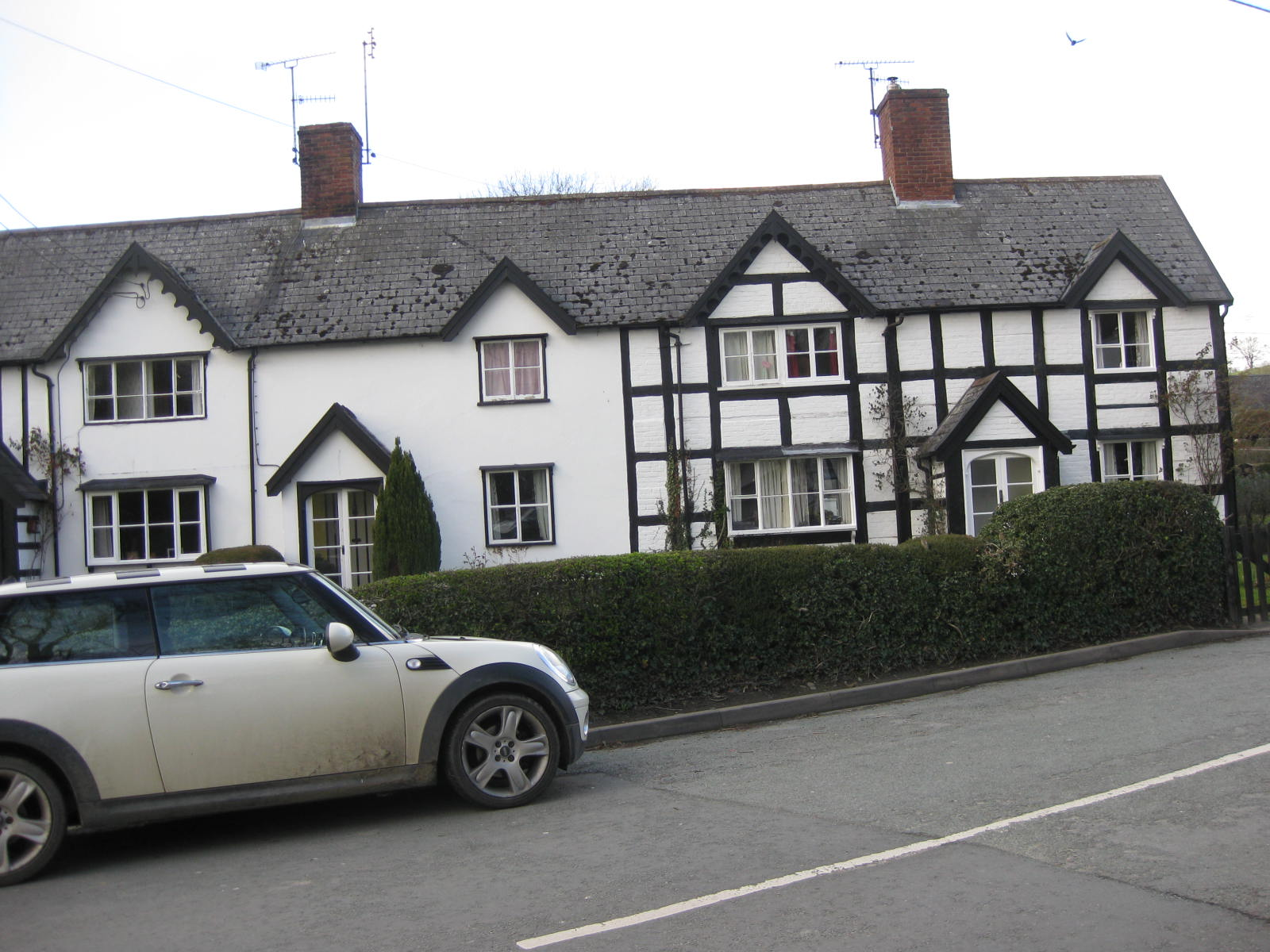
Berriew, Montgomeryshire. The Sign: Vaynor Estate Cottages

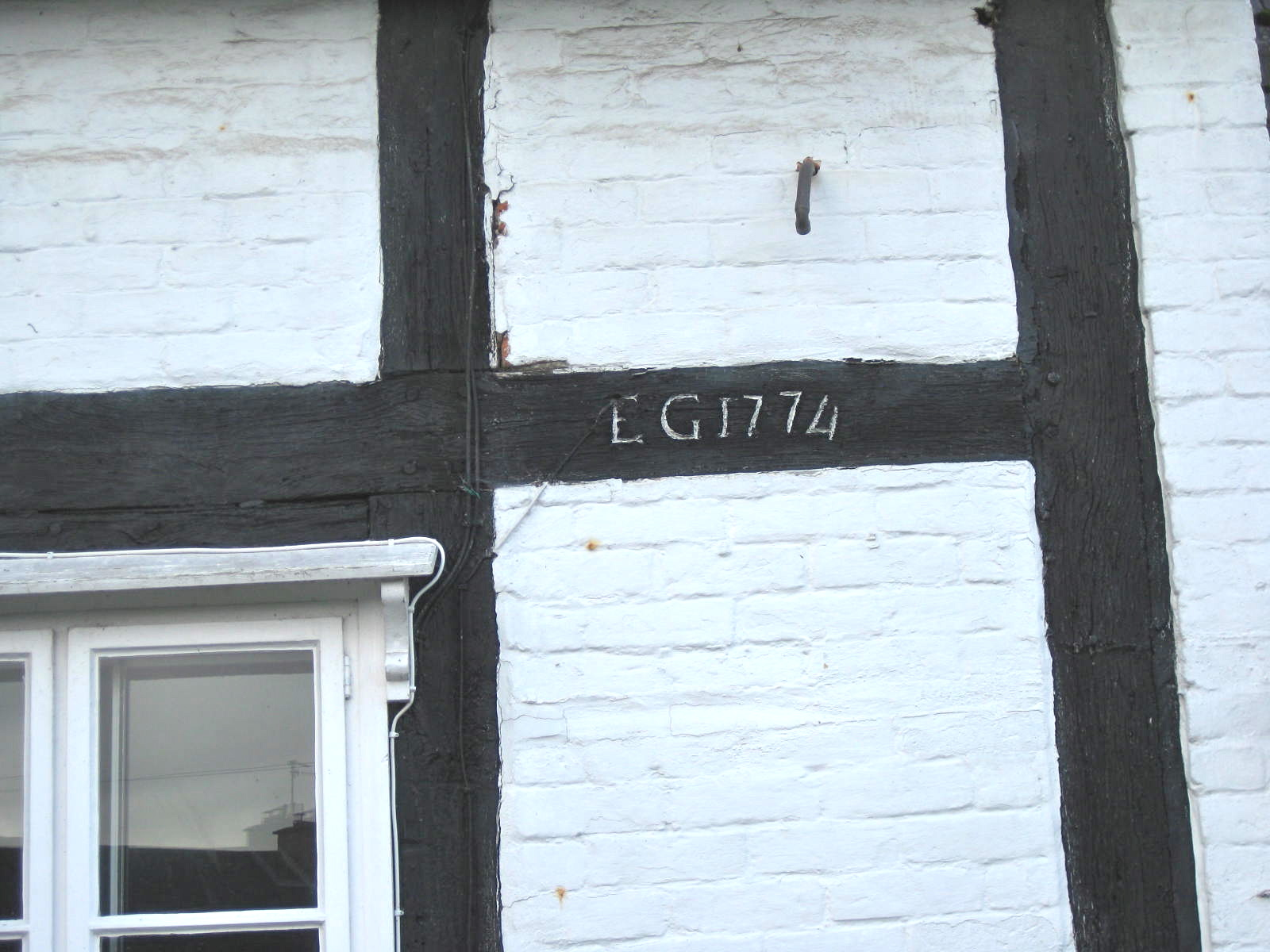
Berriew, Montgomeryshire. Date inscription on Old Smithy 1774.

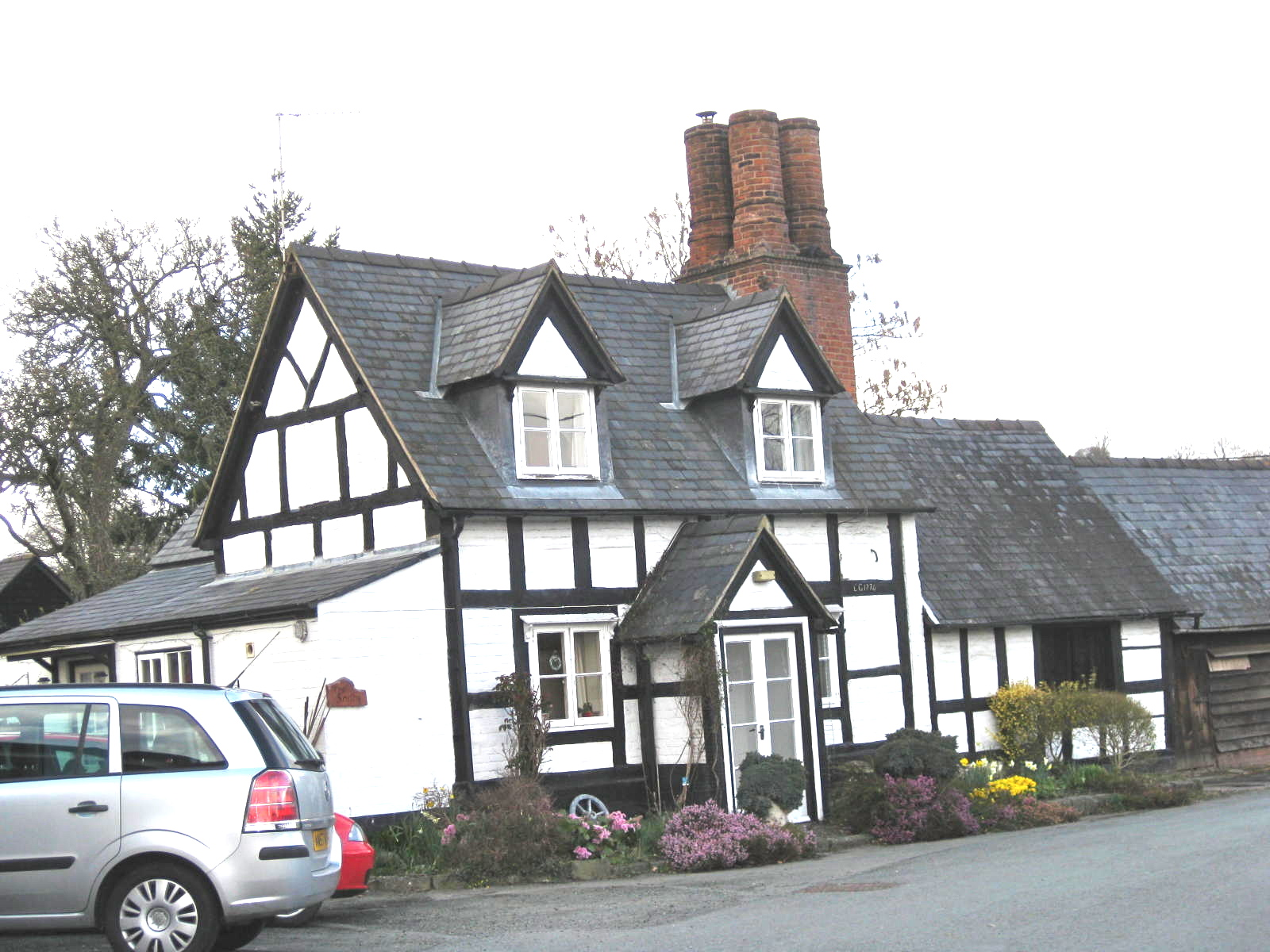
Berriew, Montgomeryshire 03

== Literature ==
- Anthony C. R.Penson's Progress: the work of a 19th-century county surveyor, Montgomeryshire Collections, 1995, Vol 83, 115–175
- Colvin H. A Biographical Dictionary of British Architects 1600–1840. Yale University Press 3rd ed 1995,748-49
- Jenkins D. E. The Penson Dynasty: Building on the Welsh Border 1822–1859, Oswestry and District Civic Society, 2002, 24pp.
- Hubbard E, The Buildings of Wales: Clwyd, Penguin/ Yale 1986, 146–147.
- Newman J & Pevsner N. The Buildings of England: Shropshire, Yale 2006.
- Scourfield R and Haslam R The Buildings of Wales: Powys; Montgomeryshire, Radnorshire and Breconshire, Yale University Press 2013.
- Stratton T The Terracotta Revival: Building Innovation and the Industrial City in Britain and Northern America Gollancz, London 1993.
