= Central Arcade, Wrexham =

Shopping arcade in Wrexham, Wales

Central Arcade
- The arcade, looking towards the Wrexham Butcher's Market
- Location: Hope Street, Wrexham, Wales
- Coordinates: 53.045376°N 2.992828°W
- Opened: 1891
- Previous names: Hope Street Arcade; Wrexham Arcade
- Architect: A. C. Baugh

Listed Building – Grade II
- Official name: Central Arcade
- Designated: 31 January 1994
- Reference no.: 1843

The Central Arcade, historically known as the Hope Street Arcade or Wrexham Arcade, is a shopping arcade in Wrexham city centre, Wales. Connecting Wrexham's Hope Street to the Butcher's Market, it was built in 1891.

== Description ==
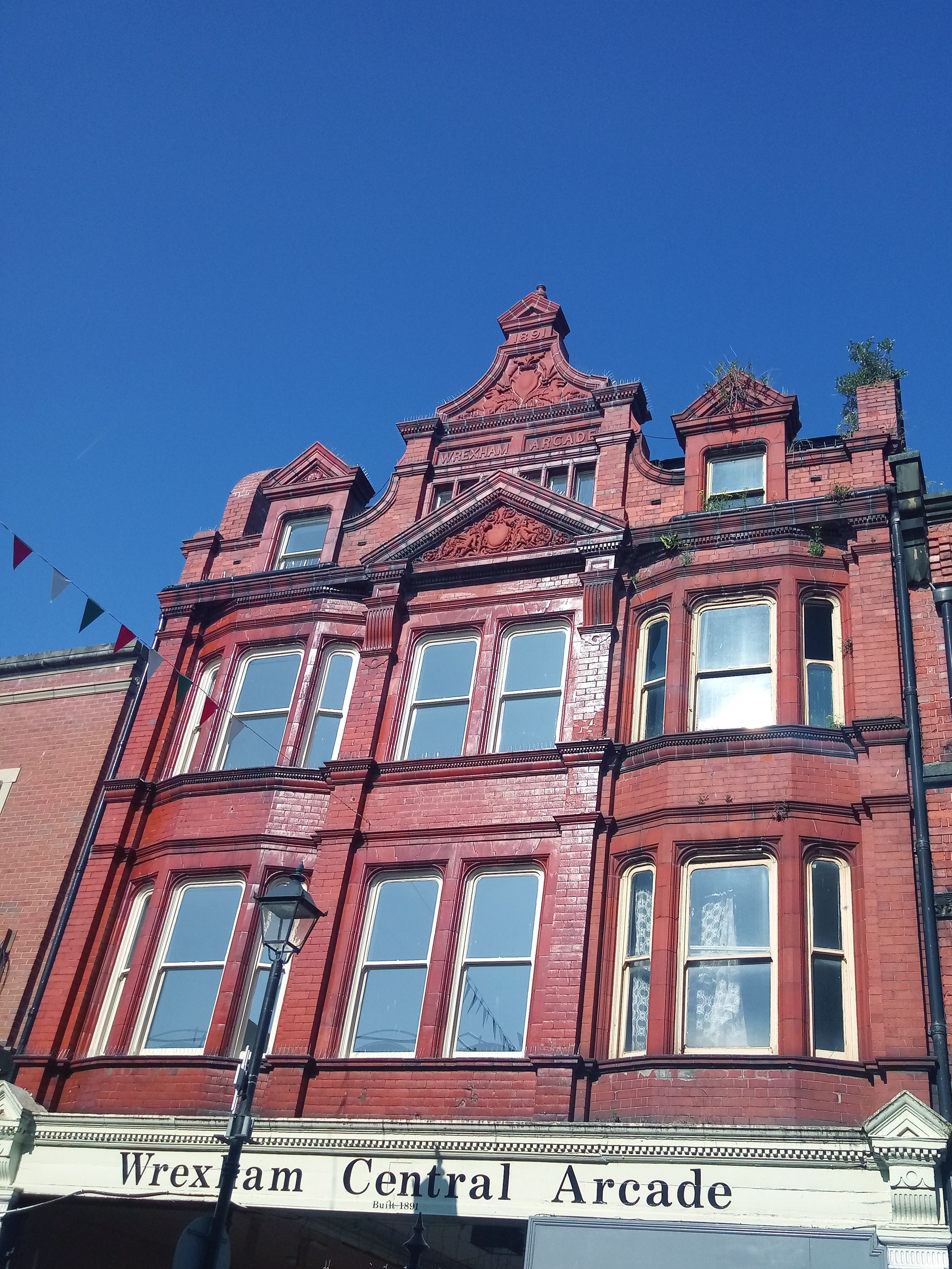
The arcade's façade above its main entrance on Hope Street

The building is Grade II listed, designed by A. C. Baugh, and built in 1891 and connects the Butcher's Market to Hope Street.

The building's exterior is covered in red brick, with terracotta dressings and a frontage slate roof, and a glazed glass roof along the arcade. The frontage building to the arcade is three-storeys with attics and a three-window range. The central entrance to the arcade is flanked eitherside by shops.

The frontage's façade contains pedimented attic windows present either side of a central pediment, containing dutch gables either side and the wording "Wrexham Arcade" in relief.

Internally, the arcade shop fronts are of white brickwork, with the shop fronts renewed from their originals, including their beaded fascias. There are tripartite windows to the upper storeys, also preserved originals, separated by pilasters containing heavy reeded console brackets. There are iron trusses to the glazed clerestory roof.

The building originally housed eighteen shops, although in the 1930s the arcade's interior was refurbished and some of the shops were removed to construct a side entrance for a Woolworths shop, which has since been rebuilt, and the new side entrance was later blocked.

Since its opening, the arcade housed various businesses included, a camera shop, jeweller, watchmaker, confectioner, patisserie, shoe repair, draper, hairdresser, travel agent, Christian book shop, and clothing shops.

== History ==
The first plan for a shopping arcade between Hope Street and the Butcher's Market was made in the Wrexham Advertiser in August 1890. To follow through the initial plans, 58 Hope Street, owned by draper Charles Davies, would need demolishing. Davies supported the development of an arcade, with Davies reaching an agreement with the Wrexham Market Hall Company to construct the arcade.

The Wrexham Arcade Company was formed to support the plans, and the arcade was initially known as the "Hope Street Arcade". The arcade offered high in demand trading space following disruption on other parts of the town centre from the construction of the Wrexham and Ellesmere Railway. In January 1891, the company held its first general share-holder meeting, with A. C. Baugh presenting the first designs for the building as its architect, and the meeting's secretary stated the arcade had received multiple applications for shops. In the meeting, Geo. Bevan, the secretary, stated the plans had been presented to the town council, and that they were approved.

58 Hope Street, owned by Charles Davies, was given up on 17 January 1891, and was later demolished to make way for the arcade. 58 Hope Street was a previously a pub known as The King's Head, from c. 1711 – c. 1745, until a business with the name moved across the street to the opposite premises. The building later was the premises of Mayor of Wrexham and tailor, John Oark, in the mid 19th-century, until being owned by Davies upon demolition.

The new arcade provided 18 lock-up shops, as well as a photography studio, and offices.

The building was designated as a Grade II listed building on 31 January 1994, due to the retention of the original 19th century architecture.

On 1 November 2017, the Hope Street entrance to the arcade received new signage.

In May 2019, the arcade was covered in hanging coloured paper globes, as part of an artwork called "Wrexham, Look Up!!".

In February 2023, the arcade underwent refurbishment works, as part of a wider regeneration of the city centre conservation area, using funding from the Wrexham Townscape Heritage Scheme and the National Lottery Heritage Fund. The refurbishment aimed to enable space on the ground floor to be used for commercial purposes, while the upper floors were converted into three 2-bed apartments. The frontage building had been vacant since 2018.

In 2024, plans to refurbish the arcade's Hope Street front and convert an upper floor into an apartment were approved.
