= Wrexham =

City in north-east Wales

Coordinates: 53°02′48″N 2°59′37″W

Wrexham: Welsh: Wrecsam
- City
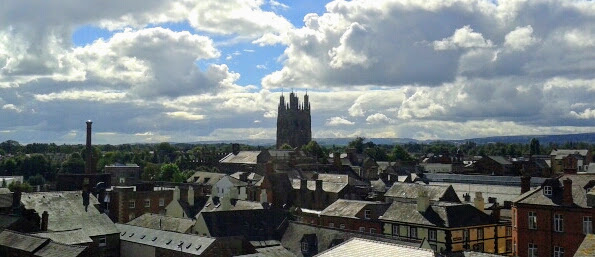
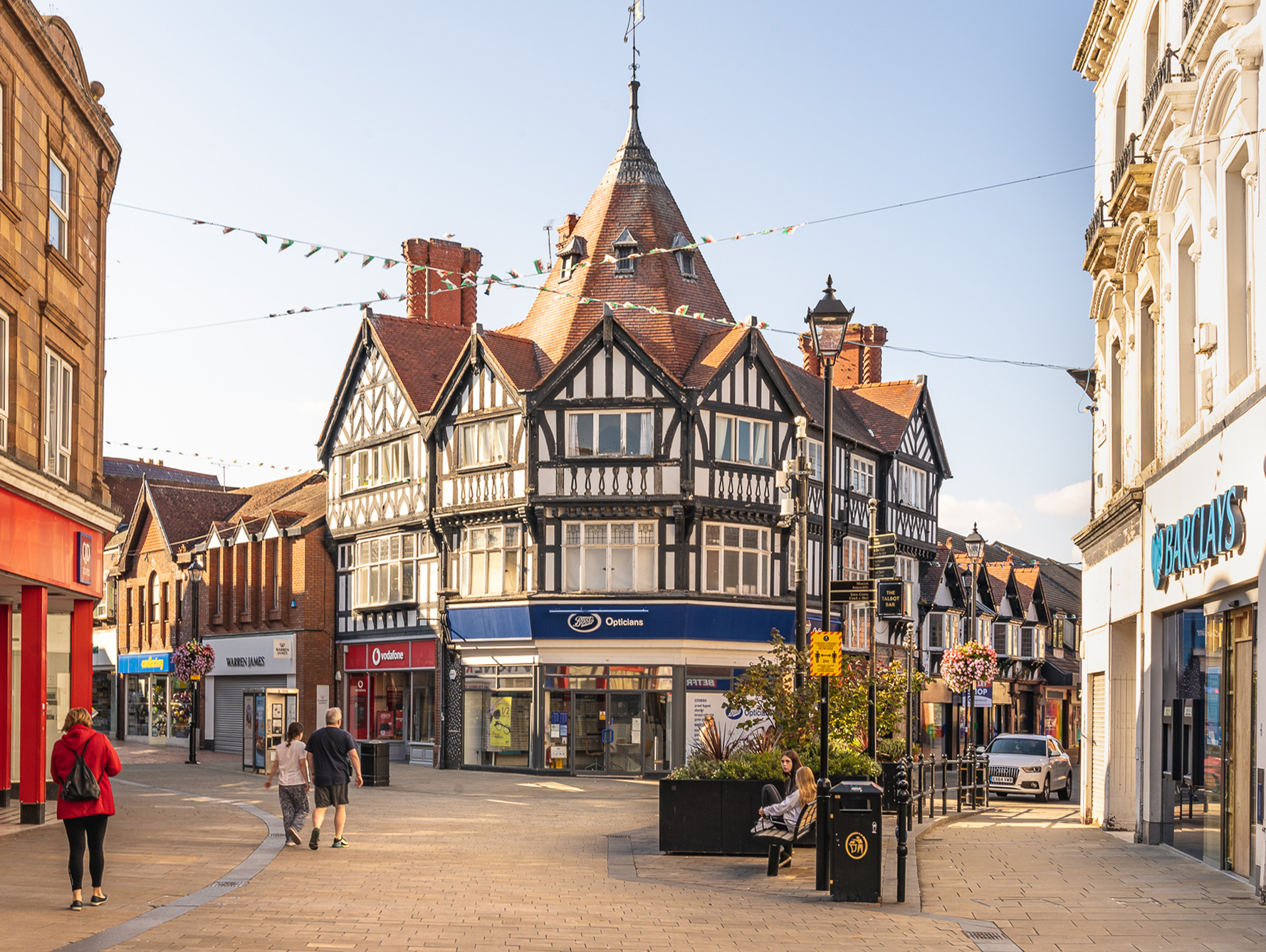
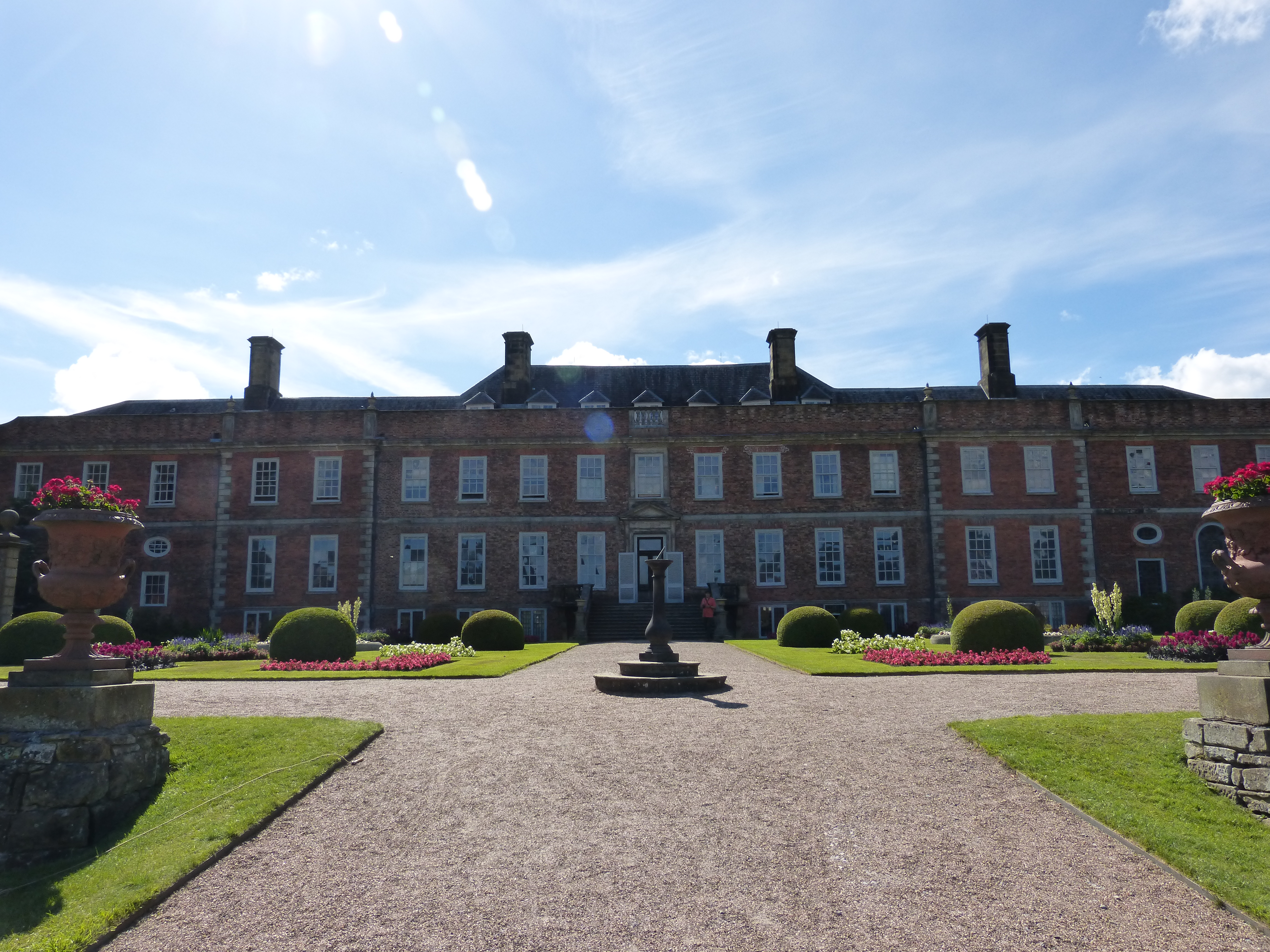
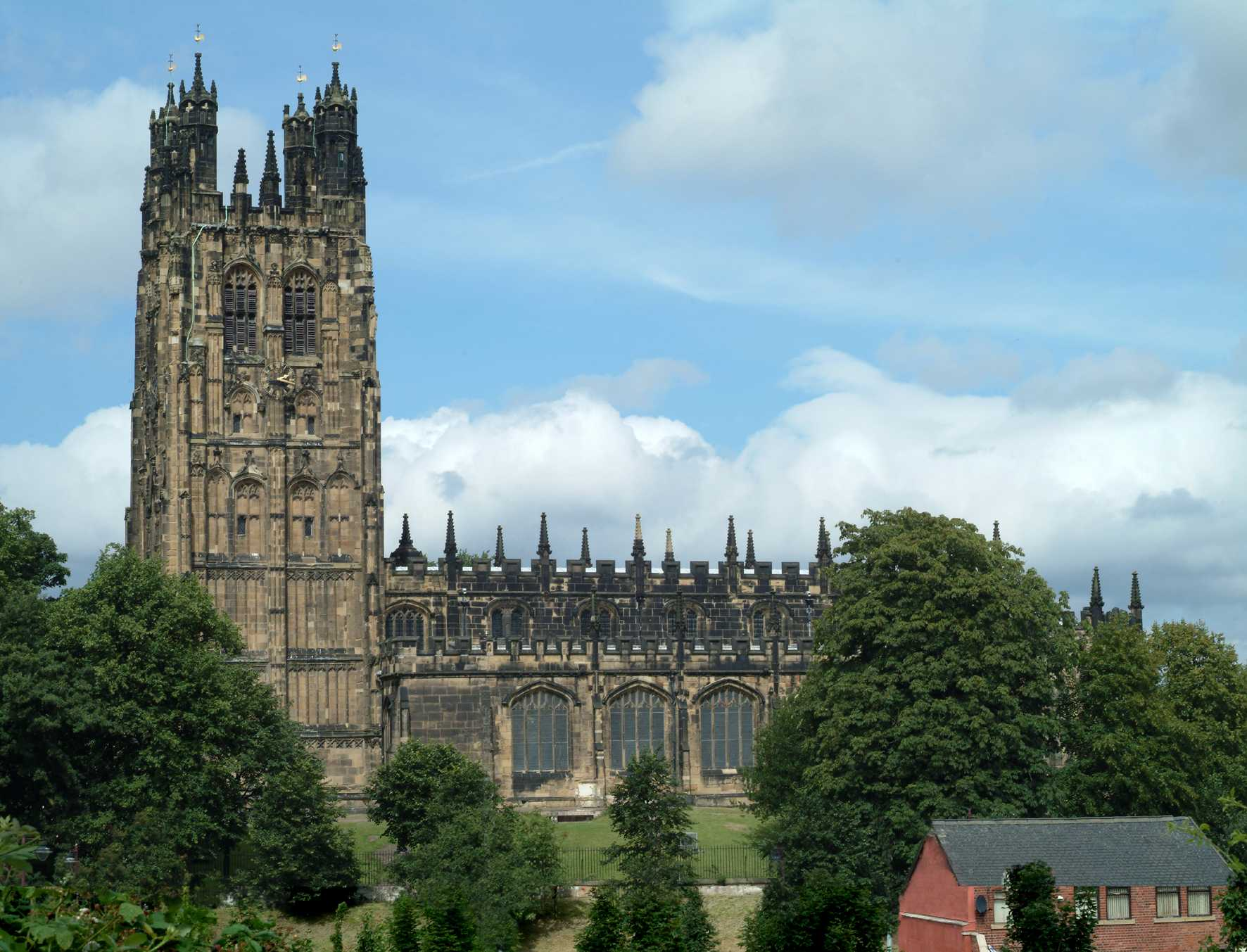
- From top, left to right: Wrexham skyline, Hope Street, Erddig Hall and St Giles' Church.

- Location within Wrexham
- Population: 44,785 (Built up area, 2021)
- OS grid reference: SJ335505
  - Cardiff: 108 mi (174 km) S
- Principal area: Wrexham
- Preserved county: Clwyd
- Country: Wales
- Sovereign state: United Kingdom
- Post town: Wrexham
- Postcode district: LL11–14
- Dialling code: 01978
- Police: North Wales
- Fire: North Wales
- Ambulance: Welsh
- UK Parliament: Wrexham
- Senedd Cymru – Welsh Parliament: Fflint Wrecsam
- Website: www.wrexham.gov.uk

Wrexham (/ˈrɛksəm/ REK-səm; Welsh: Wrecsam [ˈrɛksam]) is a city (Note: The city status is officially held by Wrexham County Borough.) in the north-east of Wales. It lies between the Welsh mountains and the lower Dee Valley, near the border with Cheshire in England. Historically in the county of Denbighshire, it became part of the new county of Clwyd in 1974. It has been the principal settlement and administrative centre of Wrexham County Borough since 1996. At the 2021 census, the built up area had a population of 44,785, the seventh largest in Wales and the largest in North Wales. The wider county borough, which also includes surrounding villages and rural areas, had a population of 135,117. It was awarded city status in 2022.

Wrexham was probably founded before the 11th century and developed in the Middle Ages as a regional centre for trade and administration. Wrexham has historically been one of the primary settlements of Wales, and was the largest settlement in Wales for a time in the 17th century. In the Industrial Revolution from the 18th century onwards, Wrexham and surrounding area was a major centre of coal and lead mining. Other significant industries included the production of iron, steel and leather, and brewing.

Wrexham serves north Wales and the Welsh borderlands as a centre for manufacturing, retail, education and administration. The city is noted for Wrexham A.F.C. (one of the oldest professional football teams in the world); the nationally significant industrial heritage of the Clywedog Valley; the National Trust Property of Erddig; and the fine Tudor church of St Giles, which towers over the historic Wrexham city centre.

== Etymology ==
The name Wrexham is most accepted to be a combination of the personal name "Wryhtel" and the old English place-name suffix "hamm". The suffix "hamm" is interpreted by modern authorities to mean "water meadows" referring to the low-lying ground of the rivers Gwenfro and Clywedog, although "river meadows" may be more accurate translation, leading to the probable old English meaning of "Wryhtel's river meadow". However, "hamm" (or "ham"), commonly adopted in the area following the advance of the Saxons, has also meant a "piece of enclosed land" without any watery connotations, a "pasture", or simply a home or hamlet. The person "Wryhtel" has not been identified, although a warrior, such as Cynwrig had been suggested as a possible origin. It has also been suggested that it is based on the old English "wryhta" meaning 'workman', or refers to the Wrocansætan from the Wrekin who had settled in the area, changing the overall meaning to be a settlement of the Wreocensæte people. Another theorised meaning for "Wrexham" is that it was a compound of rex and ham, so a "king's hamlet", or that it derives from "Writtlesham" which was stated to mean a "village/town of wreaths".

The first recorded reference to the town in 1161 is to a castle at "Wristlesham" (or "Wristlesha'"), with the present form "Wrexham" used in 1186, and again in 1200. In 1202, Madoc ap Gruffydd Maelor, Lord of Dinas Brân, referenced a 'Wrechcessham" where he granted some of his demesne lands to the abbey of Valle Crucis. "Wrixham", "Wrighesham" and "Wrightelesham" have also been described as some of the oldest spellings, but local historian Alfred Neobard Palmer credits some other older spellings as errors by transcribers who mistook "c" for "t". It has had various other spellings. (Note: It was also spelled as Gwrexam in 1254 (and 1560), Gwregsam and "Wyrcessham" in 1291, "Wryttisham", "Wrightesham" and "Wrechtessham" in 1294, "Wrectesham" in 1295, "Wryghtlesham" and "Wrightlesham" in 1316, "Wrexam" in the 13th century, "Wreckesham" in the 1547 Inventory of King Henry VIII, Gwreksam in c. 1566, "Wricksam" during the Elizabethan era, and later "Gwryxam". "Wryghtelsham", "Wrightesham", "Wrightelsham", "Writtisham", "Wrythesham", "Wyrcessum" and "Wricksham" have also been used.)

An earlier Welsh name for the settlement may have been Caer Fantell (also spelled "K[aer] Vantell") which sometimes translated as "the mantle camp" or "mantle fort". Although this could be represented in the name of nearby Rhostyllen. By the 13th century the Welsh name was recorded as Gwrexham or Gregsam, and later changing to Gwrecsam, for it to be given a Welsh appearance and pronunciation. While it has no literal meaning in Welsh, it had been given the humorous (witty) meaning of Gwraig Sam, "Sam's wife". Nonetheless, this developed into the modern Welsh name Wrecsam, ultimately a cymricisation, derived from the English spelling that was adopted phonetically into Welsh, but maintains the pronunciation with "w" being a silent letter. The minor difference in spelling between the two modern names has led to calls to drop the original English name "Wrexham" for the Welsh one Wrecsam to promote Welsh-language culture and heritage. The Welsh Language Commissioner recommends, where there is minor difference of one or two letters between the two forms, that preference is given to the Welsh and not the English form, although it recognises some established dual-forms may still be recognised, with the commissioner recognising "Wrexham" as the English form. The council's bid to UK City of Culture used the Welsh name only.

== History ==
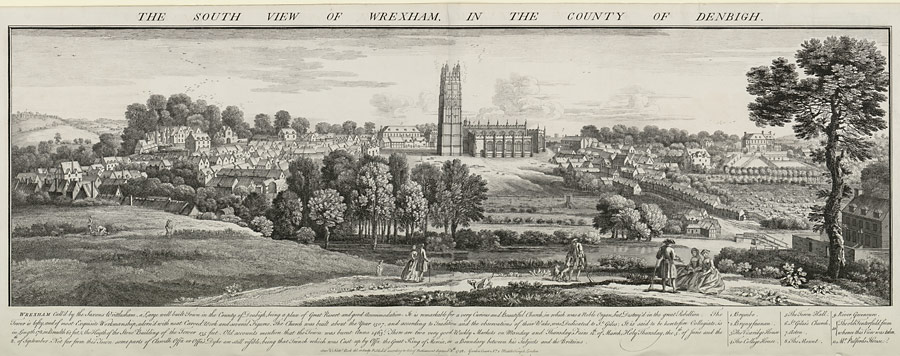
The south view of Wrexham in the county of Denbigh, 1748, by Samuel and Nathaniel Buck

=== Early history ===
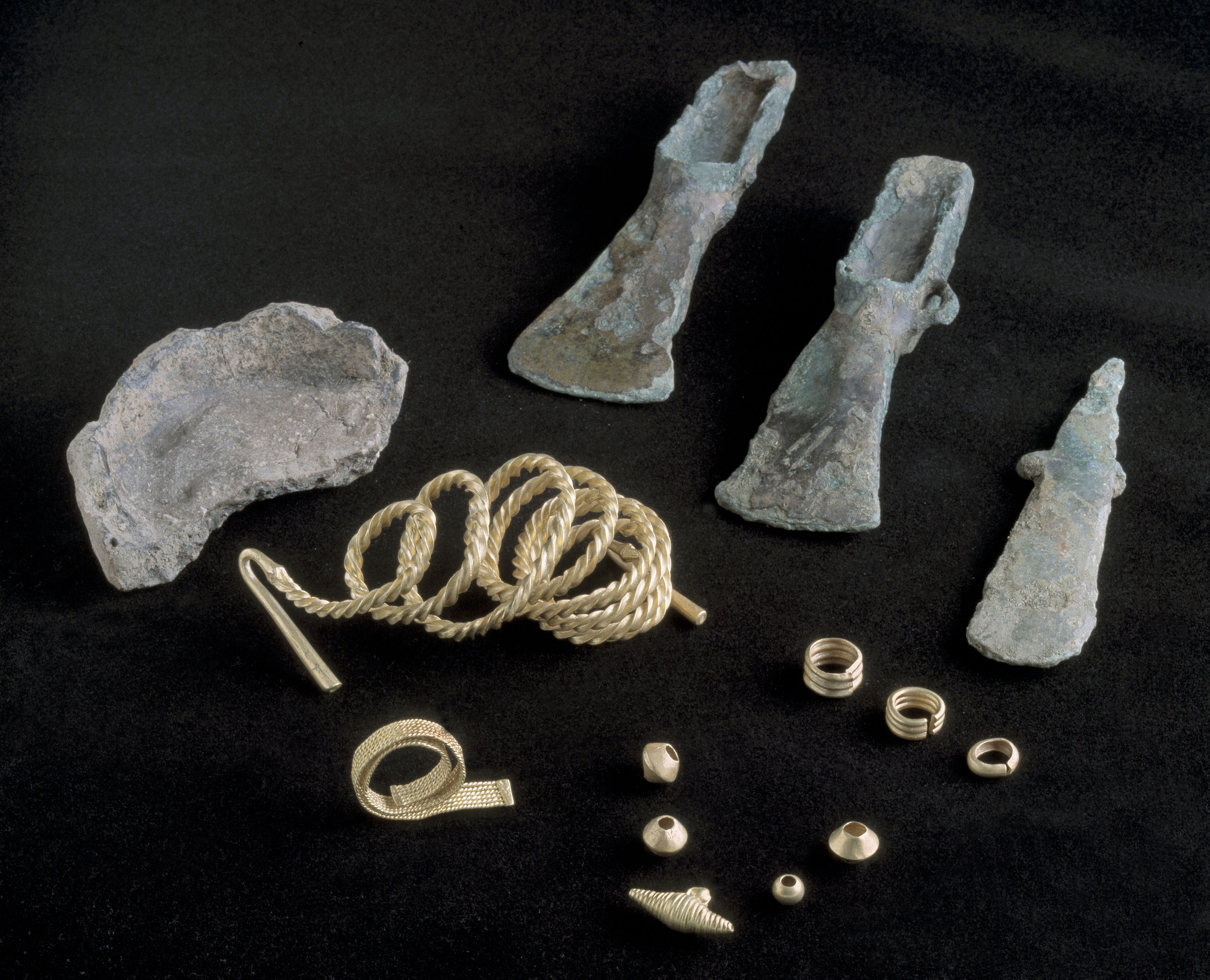
Middle Bronze Age hoard from Burton, Wrexham

Human activity in the Wrexham area dates back to the Mesolithic period (8000 to 4300 BC), with tools made from flint being found to the east of the city. Two Bronze Age burial mounds are located to the west of the modern city centre and there is evidence that the area had developed into a centre for an innovative metalworking industry by the early Middle Bronze Age. A series of Iron Age hill-forts is located to the west of present-day Wrexham along the upland-lowland line suggesting the presence of an ancient tribal boundary.

At the time of the Roman conquest of Britain, the area which Wrexham formed part of was held by a Celtic tribe called the Cornovii. A Roman civilian settlement was located in the Plas Coch area of Wrexham and excavations have revealed evidence of agriculture and trade with the wider Roman world. Following the end of Roman rule in Britain, Wrexham formed part of the Romano-British Kingdom of Powys.

=== Medieval ===
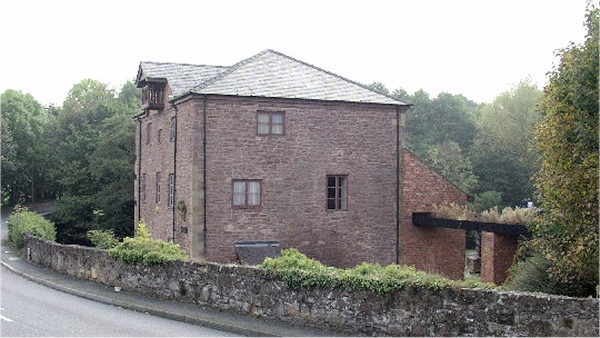
The 'King's Mills', believed to have origins in the 14th century

The Battle of Chester circa 615/616 marked the beginning of a long struggle between the Welsh and English for territory in this part of Wales. During the eighth century, the Anglo-Saxon royal house of Mercia pushed their frontiers westwards and established the earth boundaries of Wat's Dyke and Offa's Dyke to the west of the present city.

It was probably during this first period of Mercian advance in the eighth century that the settlement of Wrexham was founded on the flat ground above the meadows of the River Gwenfro. The name Wrexham probably comes from the old English for Wryhtel's river meadow. Alternatively, the name may have described a settlement of the Wreocensæte people, who were possibly a continuation of the Cornovii tribe of Roman Britain.

The Mercians fought over north-east Wales during the eighth to tenth centuries but the Welsh Kings of Powys re-conquered the Wrexham area during the 11th century. Following the Welsh reconquest, Wrexham formed an integral part of the Powys lordship of Maelor and so does not appear in the Domesday Book of 1086. The first recorded reference to the town in 1161 is to a castle at 'Wristlesham'.

Stability under the princes of Powys Fadog enabled Wrexham to develop as a trading town and administrative centre of one of the two commotes making up the Lordship. In 1202, Madoc ap Gruffydd Maelor, Lord of Dinas Brân, granted some of his demesne lands in 'Wrechcessham' to the abbey of Valle Crucis and in 1220 the earliest reference to a church in Wrexham is made.

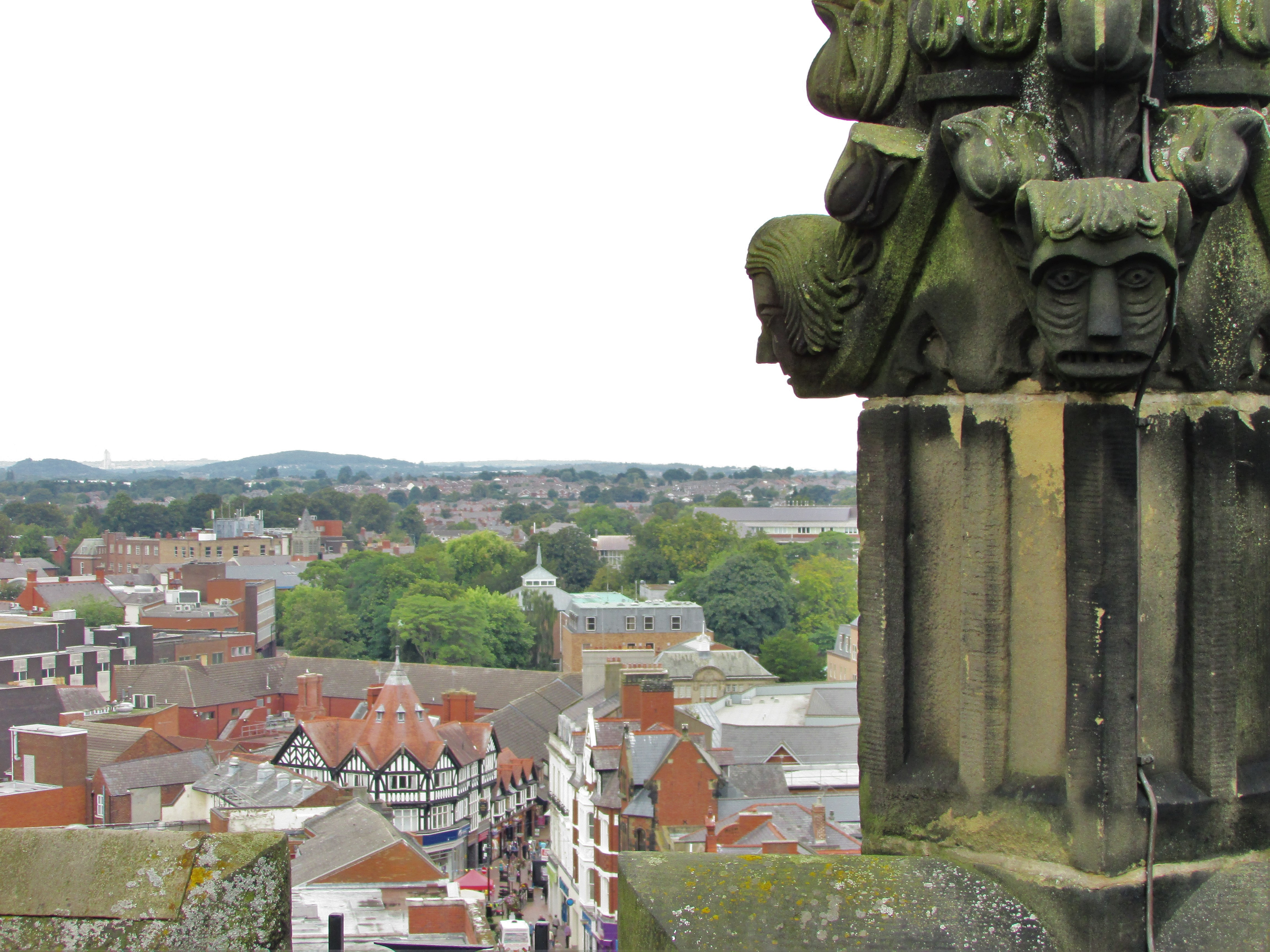
Wrexham city centre overlooked by some of the 16th century 'grotesques' of St Giles' Church

Following the loss of Welsh independence and the death in battle of Prince Llywelyn ap Gruffudd in 1282, Wrexham became part of the semi-independent Marcher lordship of Bromfield and Yale. Wrexham increased in importance throughout the Middle Ages as the lordship's administrative centre, and the then town's position made it a suitable centre for the exchange of the produce of the Dee valley and Denbighshire uplands, whilst iron and lead were also mined locally.

By 1327, Wrexham had become a market town. It became one of the largest settlements in Wales, and a celebrated centre for Welsh craftsmen. The town was particularly well known in the 14th and 15th centuries for the manufacture of Welsh bucklers, as illustrated by the mention in the 1547 Inventory of King Henry VIII of 'wreckesham Buckelers'. In 1391 Wrexham was wealthy enough for a bard, jester, juggler, dancer and goldsmith to earn their living there. The traditional pattern of Welsh life – law, administration, customs and language – remained undisturbed through the Middle Ages and the pattern was for local English people to rapidly adopt the Welsh-language and to be assimilated into Welsh culture, even to point of adopting Welsh Patronymic surnames.

The local Welsh nobility and peasantry backed the uprising led by Owain Glyndŵr against King Henry IV of England during the early 15th century. Local poet Guto'r Glyn (c. 1412 – c. 1493) heralded Siôn ap Madog, the great-nephew of Owain Glyndŵr, as Alecsander i Wrecsam ('an Alexander for Wrexham') and the poet Hywel Dafi addresses Siôn's heir as Gwregys am ais Gwregsam wyt ('a girdle around the heart of Wrexham').

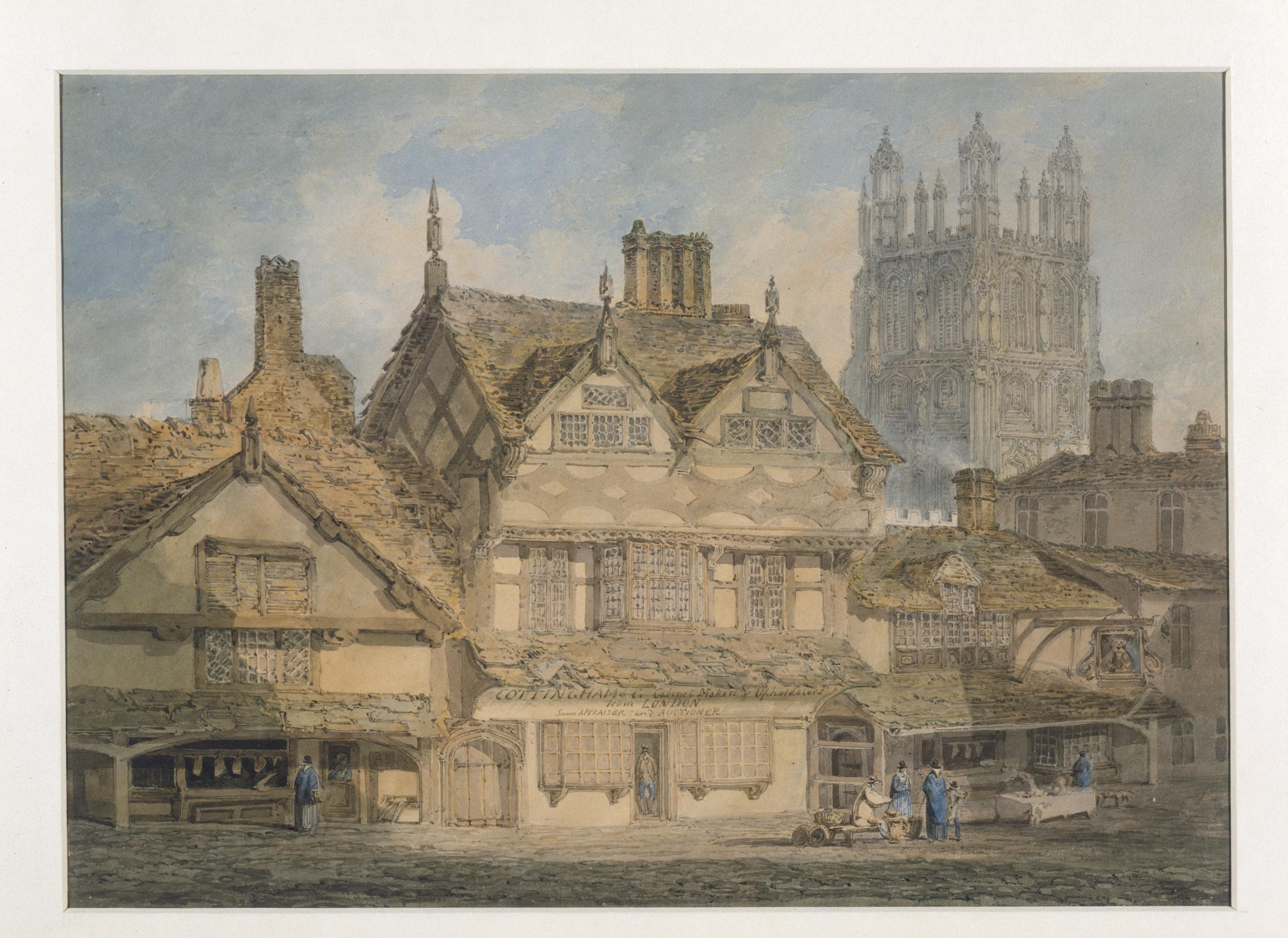
JMW Turner, 'Wrexham, Denbighshire', late 18th century, watercolour. V&A Museum, London

=== Early Modern ===
The Acts of Union passed during the reign of Henry VIII brought the lordship into the full system of English administration and law. It became part of the new shire of Denbighshire in 1536.

In 1584 St Richard Gwyn, a local Recusant, schoolteacher, and poet in the Welsh-language, was convicted of high treason based on his Catholic beliefs by a panel of judges headed by the chief justice of Chester, Sir George Bromley. On 15 October 1584, Gwyn was taken to the Beast Market and hung, drawn and quartered for his faith. He was canonised by Pope Paul VI in 1970 as one of the Forty Martyrs of England and Wales. His Feast Day is 17 October.

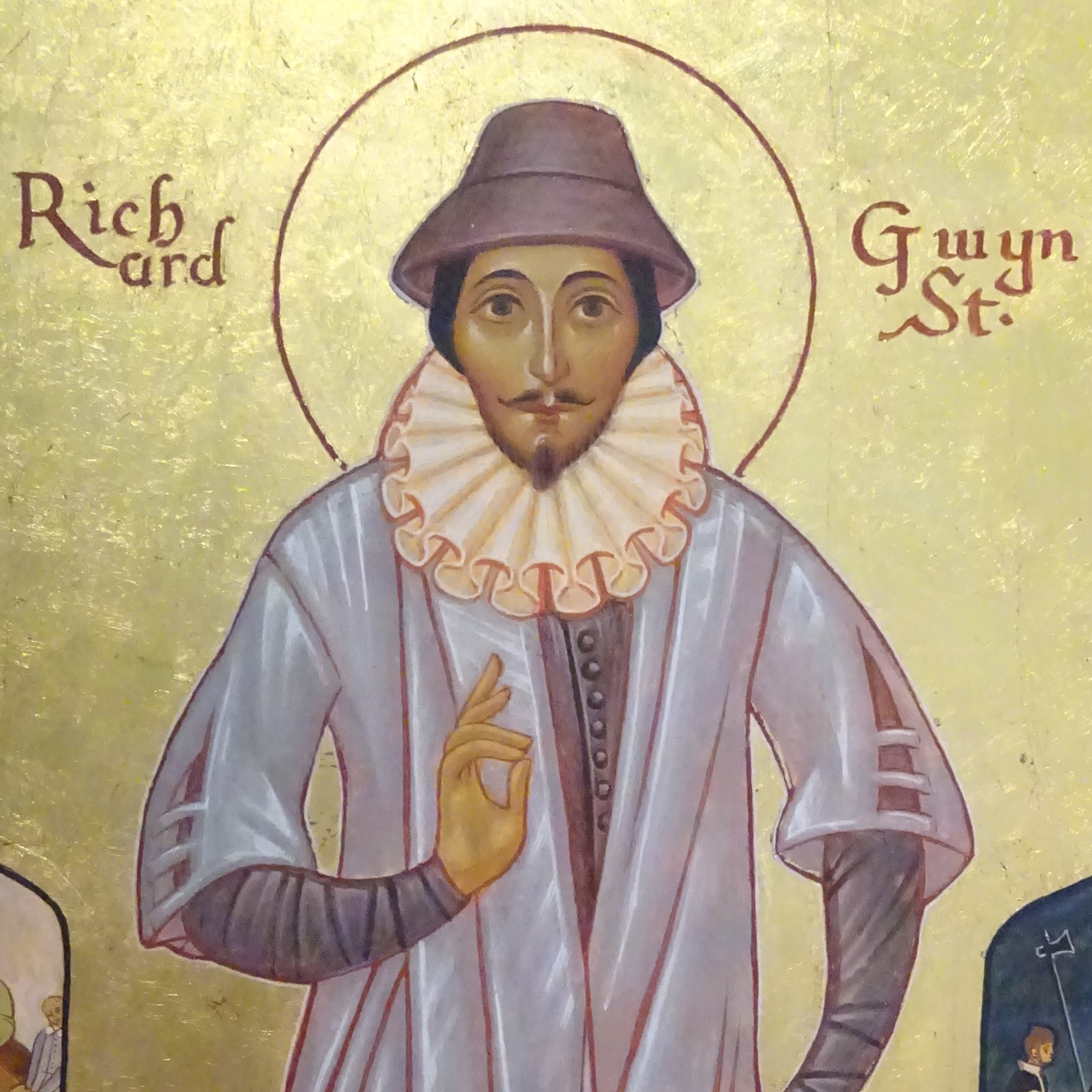
A painting of St Richard Gwyn in Wrexham Cathedral

The main body of the church of St Giles was rebuilt in the late 15th and early 16th centuries to become one of the finest examples of ecclesiastical architecture in Wales.

The economic character remained predominantly as an agricultural market town into the 17th century but there were workshops of weavers, smiths, nailers as well as dye houses. The 1620 Norden's jury of survey of Wrexham Regis stated that four-fifths of the land-holding classes of Wrexham bore Welsh names and every field except one within the manor bore a Welsh or semi-Welsh name. A grammar school was established in 1603 by Alderman Valentine Broughton of Chester.

During the English Civil War, most of the local Welsh gentry supported King Charles I and in 1642 the king addressed enthusiastic crowds in the town. However, local landlord Sir Thomas Myddelton declared for the Rump Parliament and Parliamentarians occupied the town in 1643 and 1645. Wrexham served as military headquarters for both forces and a quarter of houses were burned down in 1643 during the quartering of troops in the town.

In the 17th century, Wrexham served as an educational and cultural focal point for local society and became a 'Puritan Metropolis'. Morgan Llwyd, the radical nonconformist preacher and writer, was educated at the Wrexham Grammar School and became Vicar of Wrexham in 1645. For a time in the 17th century, Wrexham was the largest settlement in Wales.

=== Late Modern ===
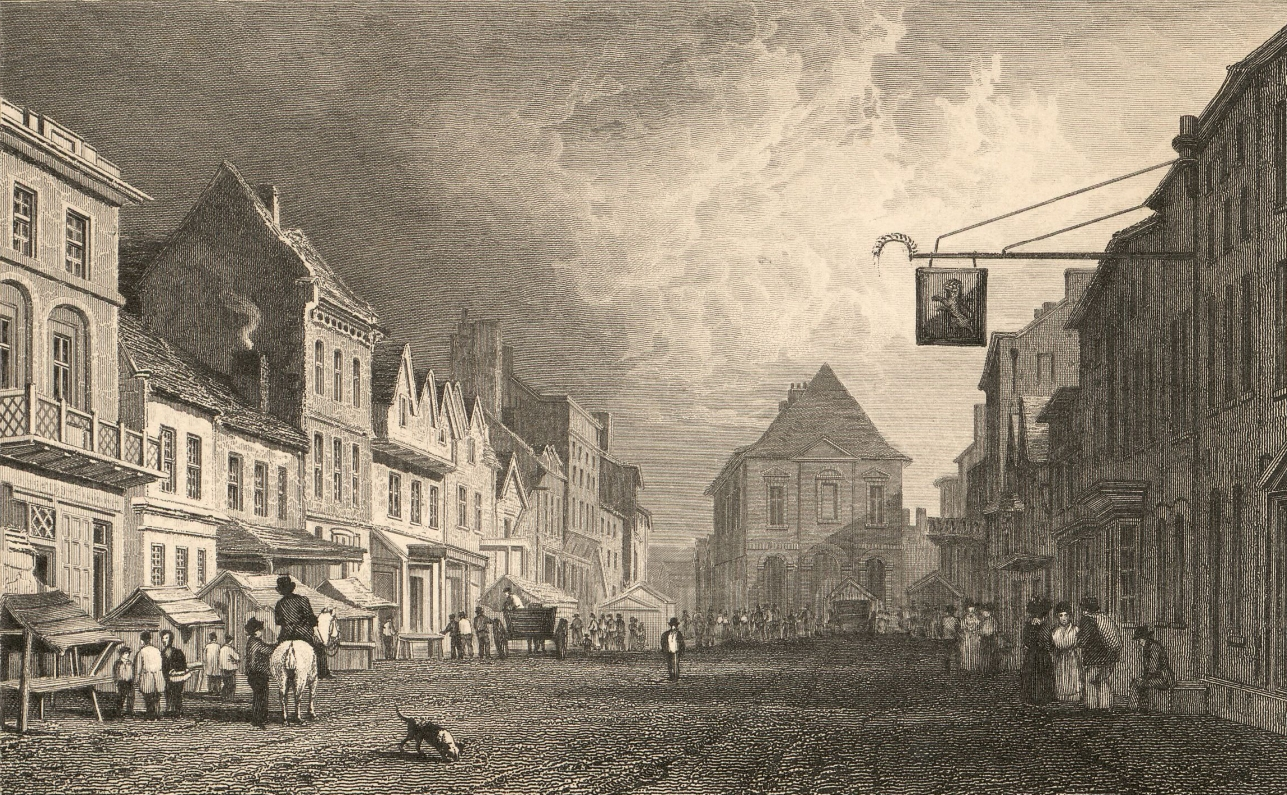
An 1831 view of Wrexham High Street with the old Town Hall in the background

Wrexham was known for its leather industry and by the 18th century there were a number of skinners and tanners in the town.

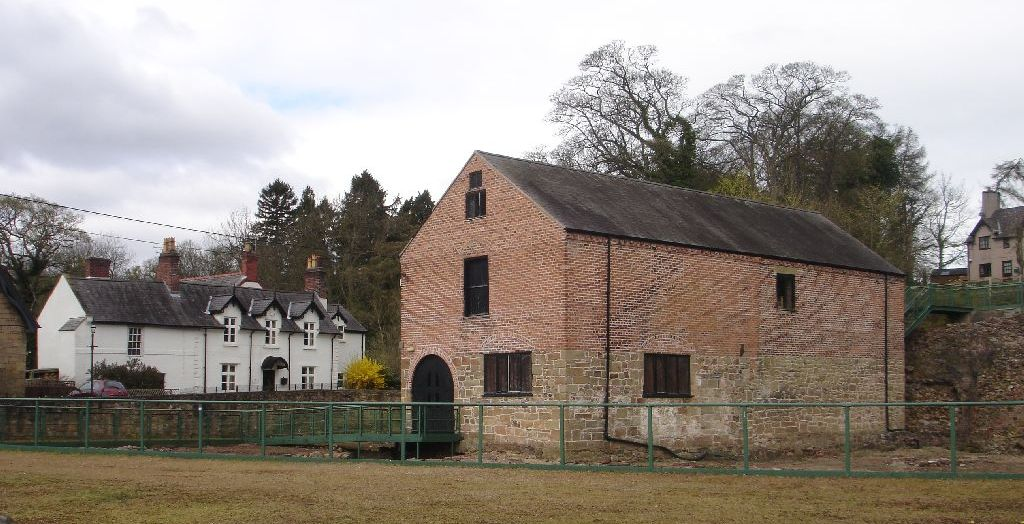
Bersham Ironworks, established in 1715

The Industrial Revolution began in Wrexham in 1762 when the entrepreneur John Wilkinson (1728–1808), known as "Iron Mad Wilkinson", opened Bersham Ironworks. Wilkinson's steam engines enabled a peak of production at Minera Lead Mines on the outskirts of Wrexham.

From the late 18th century numerous large-scale industrialised collieries operated in the southern section of the North East Wales coalfield, alongside hundreds of more traditional small-scale pits belonging to a mining tradition dating back to the Middle Ages. 18th century literary visitors included Samuel Johnson, who described Wrexham as "a busy, extensive and well-built town", and Daniel Defoe who noted the role of Wrexham as a "great market for Welch flannel". The artist J. M. W. Turner also visited the town in 1792-93 and 1794 which resulted in his drawings of St Giles Parish Church and surrounding buildings and a watercolour painting of a street scene. Rev. William Bingley described Wrexham in 1839 as "of such size and consequence as to have occasionally obtained the appellation of the metropolis of North Wales". Wrexham gained its first newspaper in 1848. The Market Hall was built in 1848, and in 1863 a volunteer fire brigade was founded. In addition to brewing, tanning became one of Wrexham's main industries.

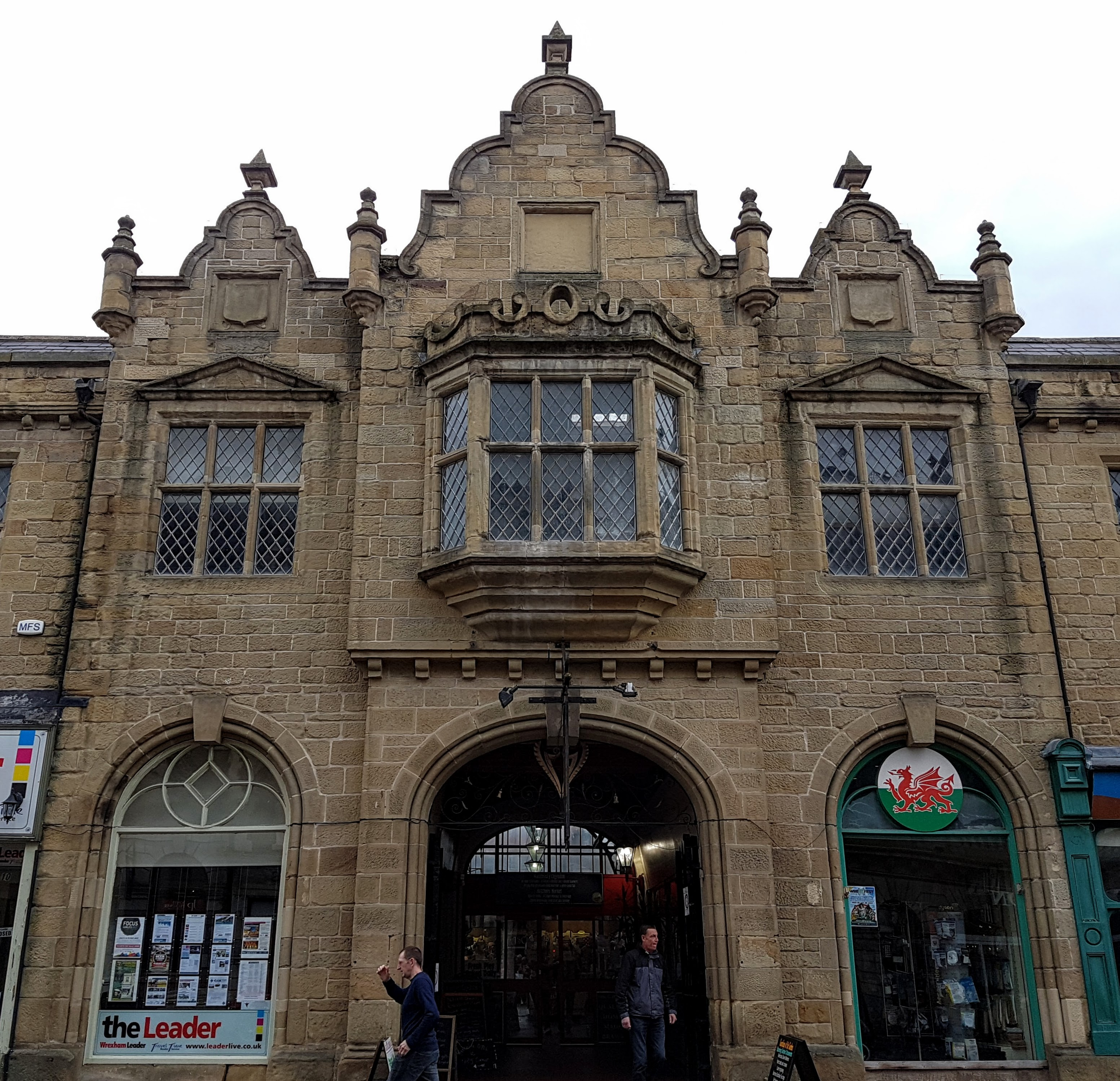
The Butchers' Market, built in 1848

By 1851, the population of Wrexham was 6,714; within thirty years this had increased to 10,978 as the town became increasingly industrialised.

Wrexham benefited from good underground water supplies which were essential to the brewing of beer: by the mid-19th century, there were 19 breweries in and around the town. Wrexham Lager brewery was established in 1882 in Central Road and became the first brewery in the United Kingdom to produce lager beer. A permanent military presence was established in the town with the completion of Hightown Barracks in 1877. The Poyser Street drill hall was completed in 1902.

When the 1912 National Eisteddfod of Wales was held at Wrexham, T. H. Parry-Williams achieved for the first time the feat, almost unheard of since, of winning both the chair and the Crown. Parry-Williams later recalled returning home to Rhyd-ddu, where he had been working as a hired hand upon the farm of a relative. Upon telling his employer of his double-victory, Parry-Williams was advised to, "seek grace." When Parry-Williams then explained that both victories had gained him £40, the relative shouted in angry disbelief, "Ac mi gwnest nhw i gyd ar dy din!!!" ("And you earned them all sitting on your arse!!!!")

By 1913, the North East Wales coalfield was producing up to 3 million tonnes a year and employed over 10,000 people, dominating the economic and cultural life of the area. One of the worst mining disasters in British history occurred at Gresford Colliery in 1934 when underground explosions and a subsequent fire cost the lives of 266 men. However the industry went into decline after the First World War, and of the seven large-scale collieries operating in the Wrexham area in 1946, only two functional collieries remained by 1968. The last pit to close in the Borough was Bersham Colliery in 1986. The leatherworks in Pentrefelin and Tuttle Street, the many coal mines in the area, the brickworks in Abenbury, Brymbo Steelworks and the breweries all closed in the latter half of the 20th century. Wrexham suffered from the same problems as much of industrialised Britain and saw little investment in the 1970s.

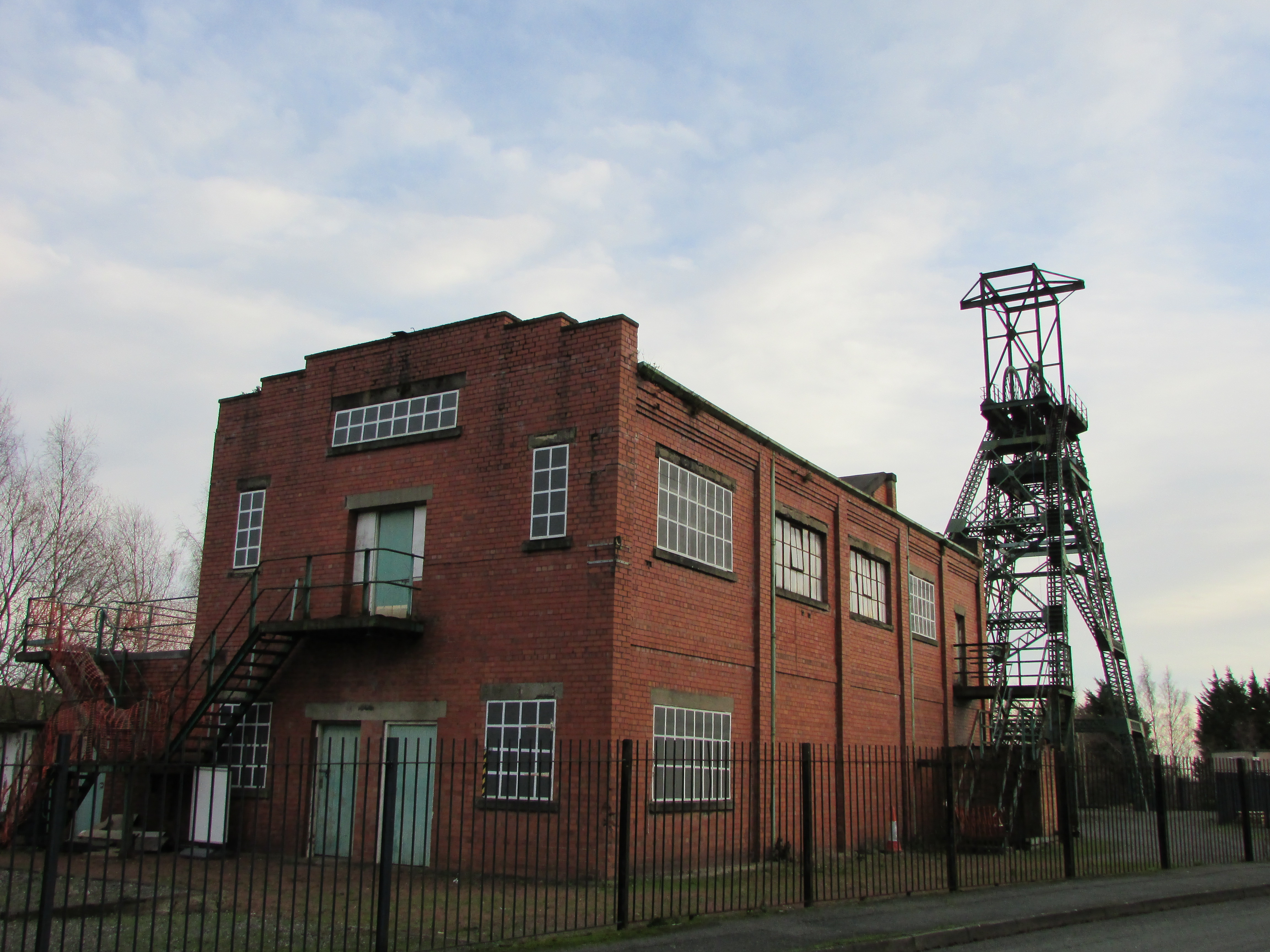
Bersham Colliery, the last working colliery in the Denbighshire Coalfield

In the 1980s and 1990s, the Welsh Development Agency (WDA) funded a major dual carriageway (the A483) bypassing Wrexham town centre and connecting it with nearby Chester and with England's trunk road network. New shopping areas have been created within the town at Henblas Square, Island Green and Eagles Meadow and the Wrexham Industrial Estate, previously used in the Second World War, has become home to many manufacturing businesses.

Wrexham Town Hall, an early 18th century arcaded structure with an assembly hall on the first floor, which had been built at the top of Town Hall, was demolished to improve traffic flows in the area in February 1940.

Wrexham's former police station on Regent Street, originally the barracks for the Royal Denbighshire Militia, is now home to Wrexham County Borough Museum. The museum has two galleries devoted to the history of the city and its surrounding communities. The museum also holds the archive of the Royal Welch Fusiliers; battalions were stationed in Wrexham during the First World War. The collection is notable for containing original documents in the handwriting of Siegfried Sassoon, Robert Graves, J. C. Dunn and other notable members of the RWF, as well as official records. The local police was housed in the high-rise Wrexham Police Station from 1973 to 2019, with the building demolished the following year. The police moved to a smaller facility next to Wrexham Library.

== Governance ==
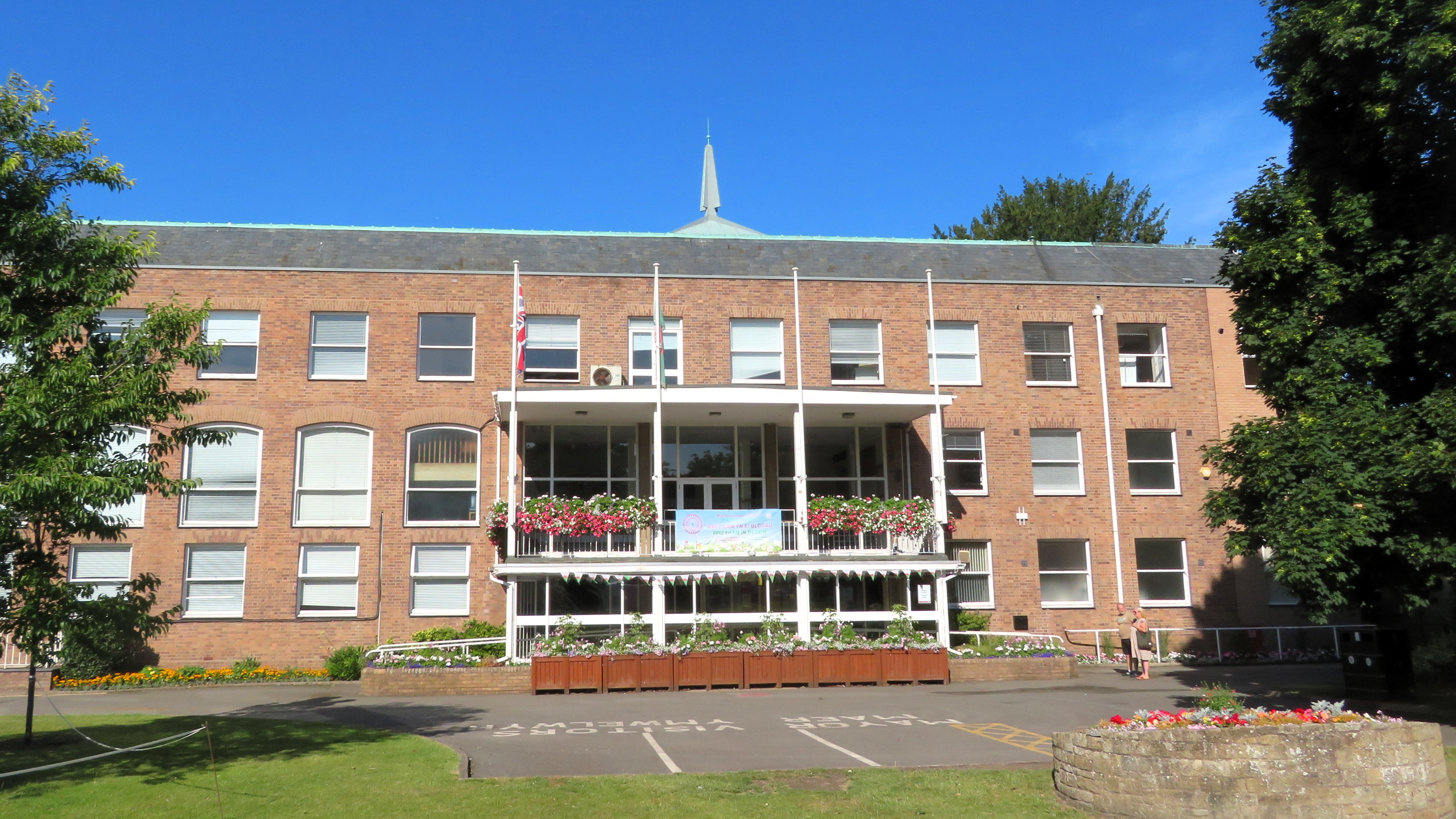
Guildhall: Headquarters of Wrexham County Borough Council

There are two tiers of local government covering Wrexham, at county borough and community level. Wrexham County Borough Council is the upper tier authority, providing most local government functions across the county borough, which extends to surrounding villages and rural areas as well as the main built up area of Wrexham itself. The county borough council is based at the Guildhall in the centre of Wrexham. The built up area of Wrexham as defined by the Office for National Statistics covers the communities of Acton, Caia Park, Offa, and Rhosddu, and also partially extends into the communities of Abenbury and Gwersyllt.

Wrexham gives its name to both the Wrexham UK Parliament constituency and the Wrexham Senedd constituency. The two constituencies have different boundaries; both include the built up area of Wrexham and adjoining rural areas, but more extensive rural areas are included in the UK Parliament constituency.

=== Administrative history ===
Wrexham was an ancient parish. It was subdivided into 15 townships:

- Abenbury Fawr
- Abenbury Fechan
- Acton
- Bersham
- Bieston
- Borras Hwfa (Note: Also spelled 'Borras Hovah')
- Broughton
- Brymbo
- Esclusham Above
- Esclusham Below
- Gourton
- Minera
- Stansty
- Wrexham Abbot
- Wrexham Regis

The Abenbury Fechan township was an exclave of Flintshire, and the rest of the parish was in Denbighshire. Abenbury Fechan was merged into Abenbury Fawr and transferred to Denbighshire in 1885. From the 17th century onwards, parishes were gradually given various civil functions under the poor laws, in addition to their original ecclesiastical functions. In some cases, including Wrexham, the civil functions were exercised by each township separately rather than the parish as a whole. In 1866, the legal definition of 'parish' was changed to be the areas used for administering the poor laws, and so the townships also became civil parishes.

A parliamentary borough of Wrexham was created in 1832 as part of the Denbigh Boroughs constituency. The parliamentary borough covered the Wrexham Abbot and Wrexham Regis townships plus two small detached parts of the Esclusham Below township, which together covered the built up area as it then was. The parliamentary borough was incorporated in 1857 to also become a municipal borough. The townships within the borough of Wrexham were united into a single civil parish called Wrexham Regis in 1885. The borough was enlarged in 1935 to take in parts of several neighbouring parishes.

The borough of Wrexham was abolished in 1974, becoming part of the larger Wrexham Maelor district of the new county of Clwyd. The area of the pre-1974 borough became a community, but was subdivided into smaller communities in 1985. Local government was reorganised again in 1996 when the modern county borough of Wrexham was created.

=== City status ===
Wrexham was granted city status in 2022 as part of the civic honours to mark the Platinum Jubilee of Elizabeth II. The city status was confirmed by letters patent dated 1 September 2022. It is formally held by Wrexham County Borough rather than any smaller definition of the settlement of Wrexham itself, although the settlement is now generally described as a city rather than a town. Wrexham had bid for city status unsuccessfully on three previous occasions in 2000, 2002 and 2012.

=== Public services ===
Wrexham Maelor Hospital (Welsh: Ysbyty Maelor Wrecsam) is the region's major acute district hospital, with over 900 beds, and is the largest of the three core hospitals in North Wales. The other NHS hospital within the county borough is Chirk Community Hospital and a former Penley Polish Hospital.

Yale Hospital (Welsh: Ysbyty Iâl), situated close to the Maelor Hospital on the Wrexham Technology Park, is Wrexham's largest private hospital with over 25 beds. Formerly BUPA Yale Hospital, it is now owned and operated by Spire Healthcare.

Wrexham is served by North Wales Police; their Eastern Division HQ has a large HQ building in Llay and a police station in the city centre. The police were formerly based at the Wrexham Police Station from 1973 to 2019, with the building being demolished in 2020.

The region's main fire station is situated on Croesnewydd Road and is part of the newly combined Ambulance Service station. Other local fire stations are located in the nearby towns of Chirk and Llangollen.

== Geography ==
Wrexham is not built on a major river, but on a relatively flat plateau between the lower Dee Valley and the Clwydian Range, the easternmost mountains of north-east Wales. This position enabled it to grow as a market town, as a crossroads between England and Wales, and later as an industrial hub – due to its rich natural reserves of iron ore and coal. But three small rivers flow through parts of the city: the Clywedog, Gwenfro and Alyn. Wrexham is also famed for the quality of its underground water reserves, which gave rise to its previous dominance as a major brewing centre.

Originally a market town with surrounding urban villages, Wrexham has now coalesced with a number of urban villages and forms North Wales' largest city. Including adjacent urban areas to Wrexham, such as that of the Gwersyllt, Rhosllanerchrugog, Coedpoeth and Llay totals to a population of over 100,000 residents.

Wrexham is approximately 13 miles (21 km) south of Chester, 30 miles (50 km) north-west of Shrewsbury, 43 miles (69 km) south-west of Manchester, and 140 miles (230 km) north of Cardiff.

== Landmarks and attractions ==
=== City centre ===
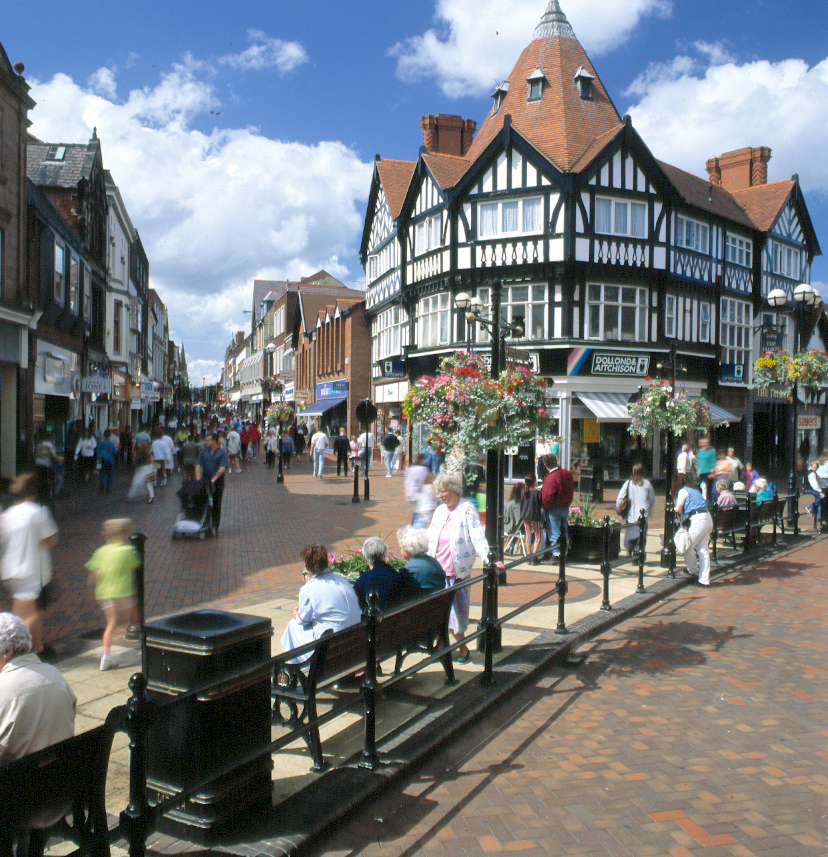
Hope Street, Wrexham city centre

The historic city centre contains a large number of listed buildings set on a medieval street pattern radiating out from the Parish Church of St Giles which was the focal point around which the city developed. The church precinct, and the surrounding narrow enclosed streets and alleyways retain a medieval character. Several complete medieval buildings survive on Town Hill and Church Street.

Hope Street, Regent Street and Queen Street form the traditional main shopping streets and are wider in some parts than others, resulting from the location of the street markets, which occurred from medieval times through to the 19th century. The shopping streets and indoor markets are interconnected by historic narrow alleyways and arcades, such as Bank Street and Central Arcade, which host small independent businesses. The half-timbered Talbot Hotel building, built in 1904, stands in a prominent position at the junction of Hope Street and Queen Street. The Horse and Jockey Public House, was probably originally built in the 16th century as a hall-house and retains its thatched roof.

High Street is notable for its grand 18th and 19th century properties of varying scale, colour and detail which were built on long, narrow burgage plots probably of medieval origin. The 18th century façade of the Wynnstay Hotel on Yorke Street closes the vista down the High Street. The hotel is notable as the birthplace of the Football Association of Wales, which was formed at a meeting in the hotel in 1876. The Golden Lion Pub on the High Street is of 16th century origin and became an inn c.1700. The listed Border Brewery chimney towers over Tuttle Street and forms a local landmark in the city centre.

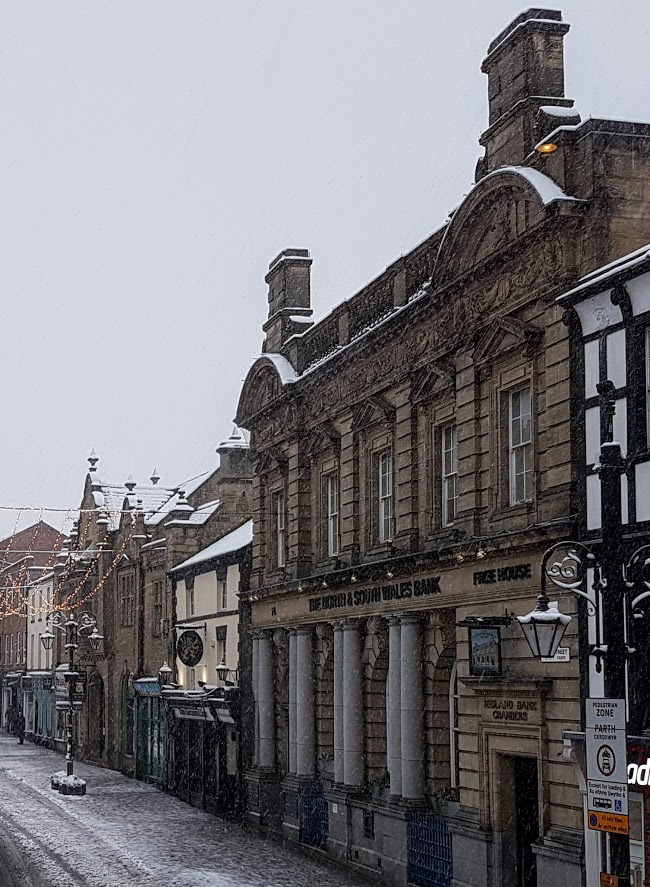
Wrexham High Street

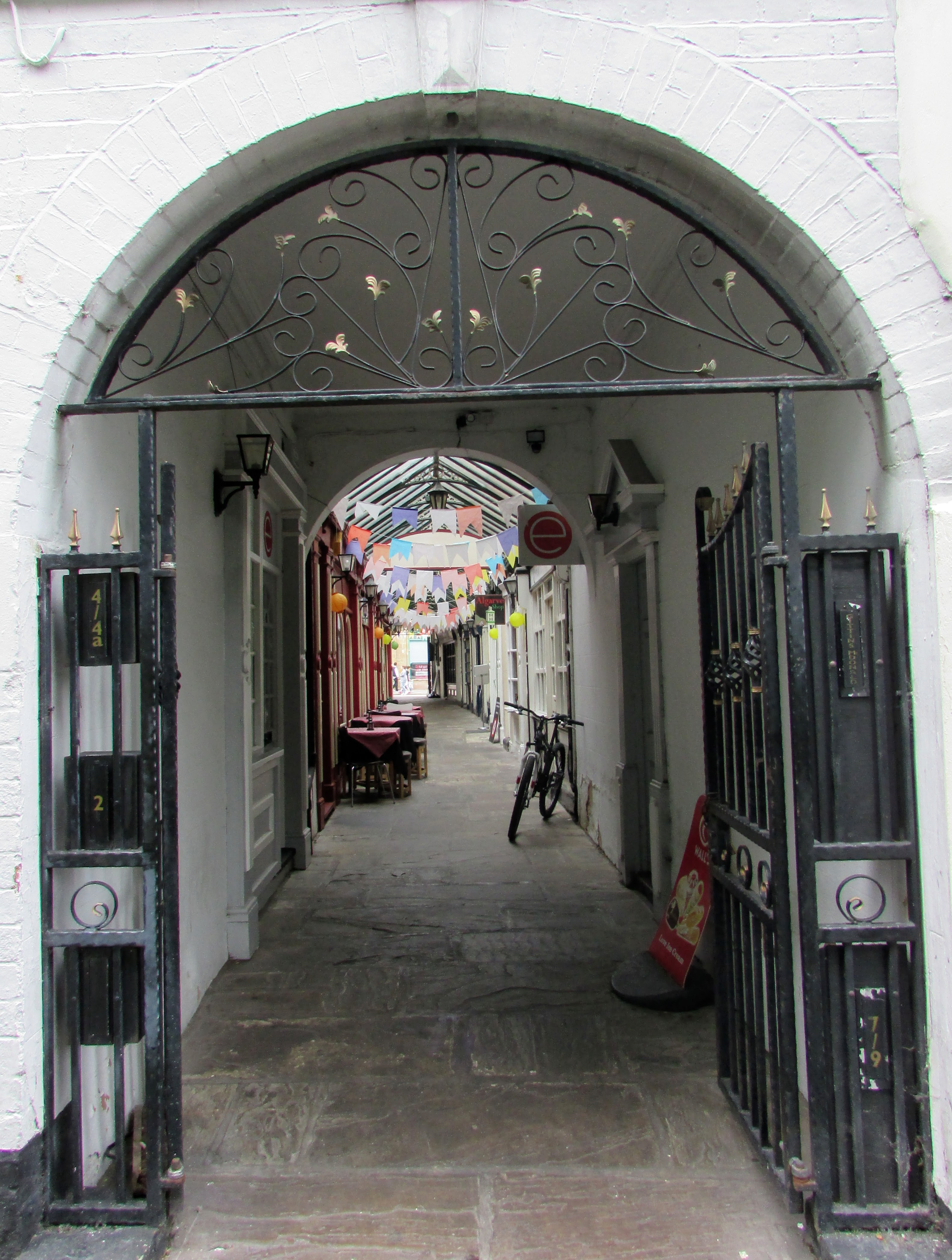
Overton Arcade

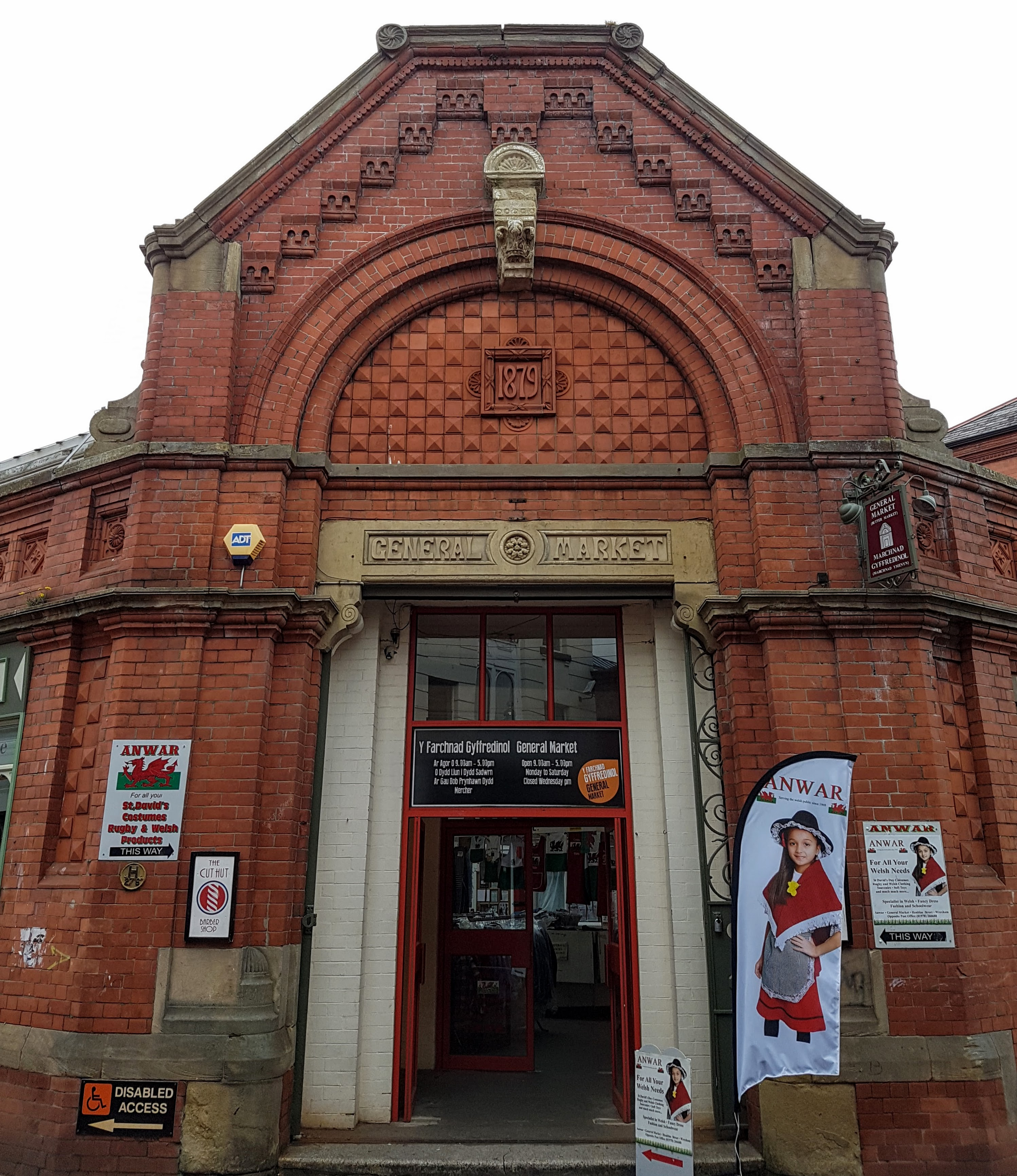
General Market

Central Arcade

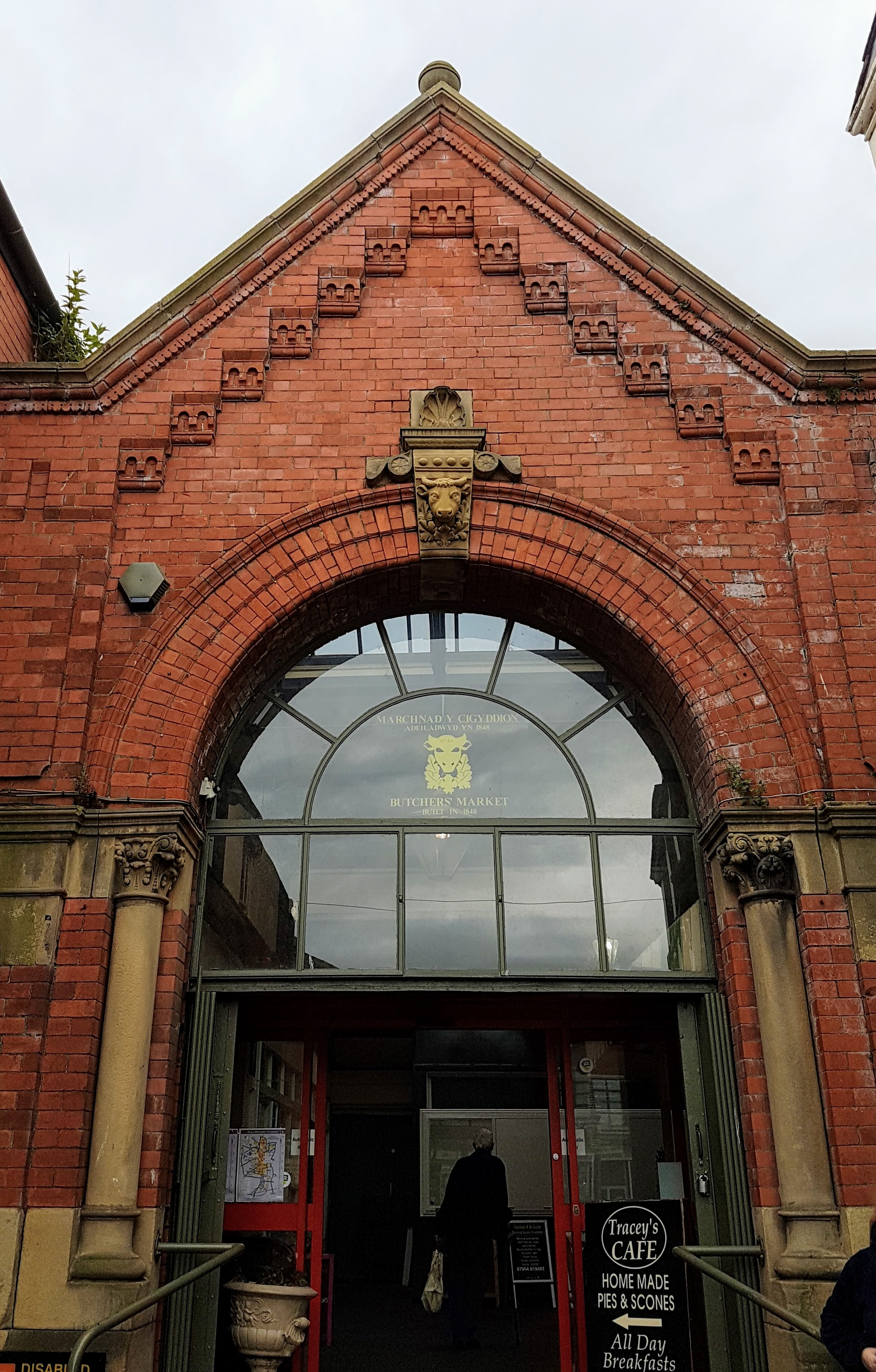
Butchers' Market

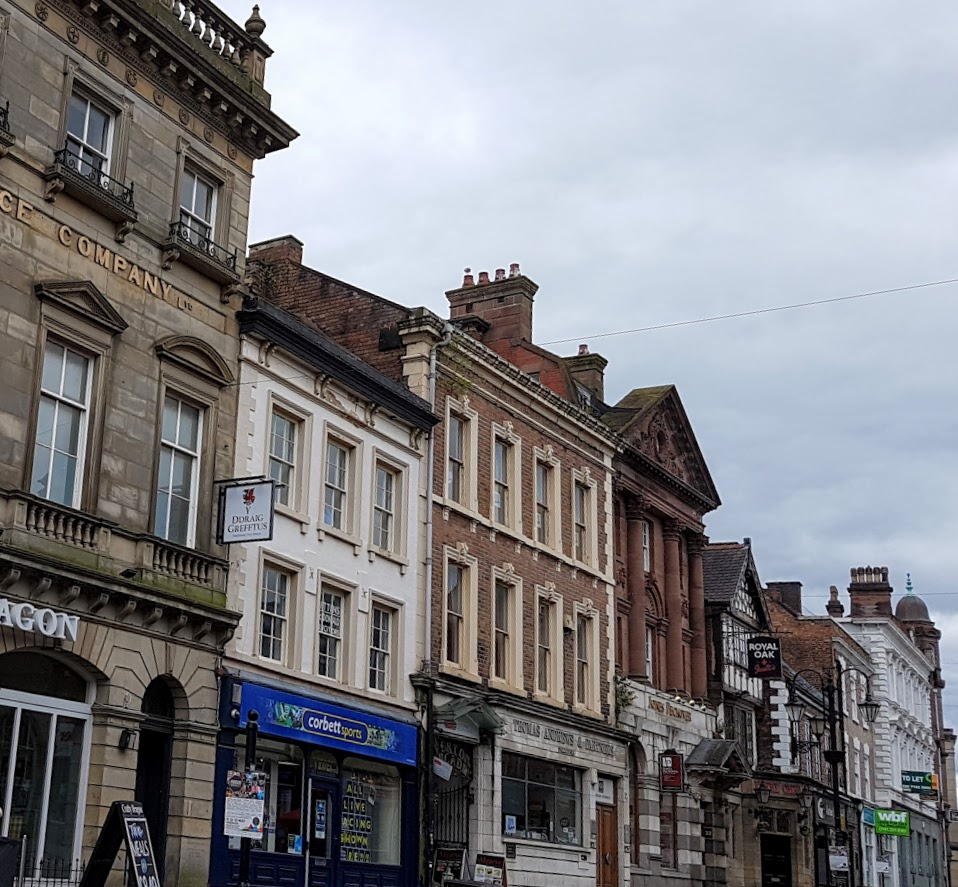
Wrexham High Street

=== Attractions ===
A number of visitor attractions can be found in the area.

- St. Giles Church – one of the Seven Wonders of Wales and burial place of Elihu Yale
- Racecourse Ground – home of Wrexham F.C. The world's oldest international stadium that still continues to host international games.
- Erddig Hall – a National Trust property.
- Xplore! – science discovery centre.
- Wrexham County Borough Museum – a museum showcasing local history.
- Indoor markets – Wrexham has always been historically known as a market town and continues this tradition with two architecturally significant Victorian indoor markets (Butchers and General).
- Focus Wales – an annual multi-venue festival that takes place in the Wrexham city centre with a focus on emerging talent and the Welsh language.
- Wales Comic Con – founded and first held in Wrexham on a university campus in 2008, the event moved to Telford in 2019, but returned for a one-day event in 2022.

=== Venues and centres ===
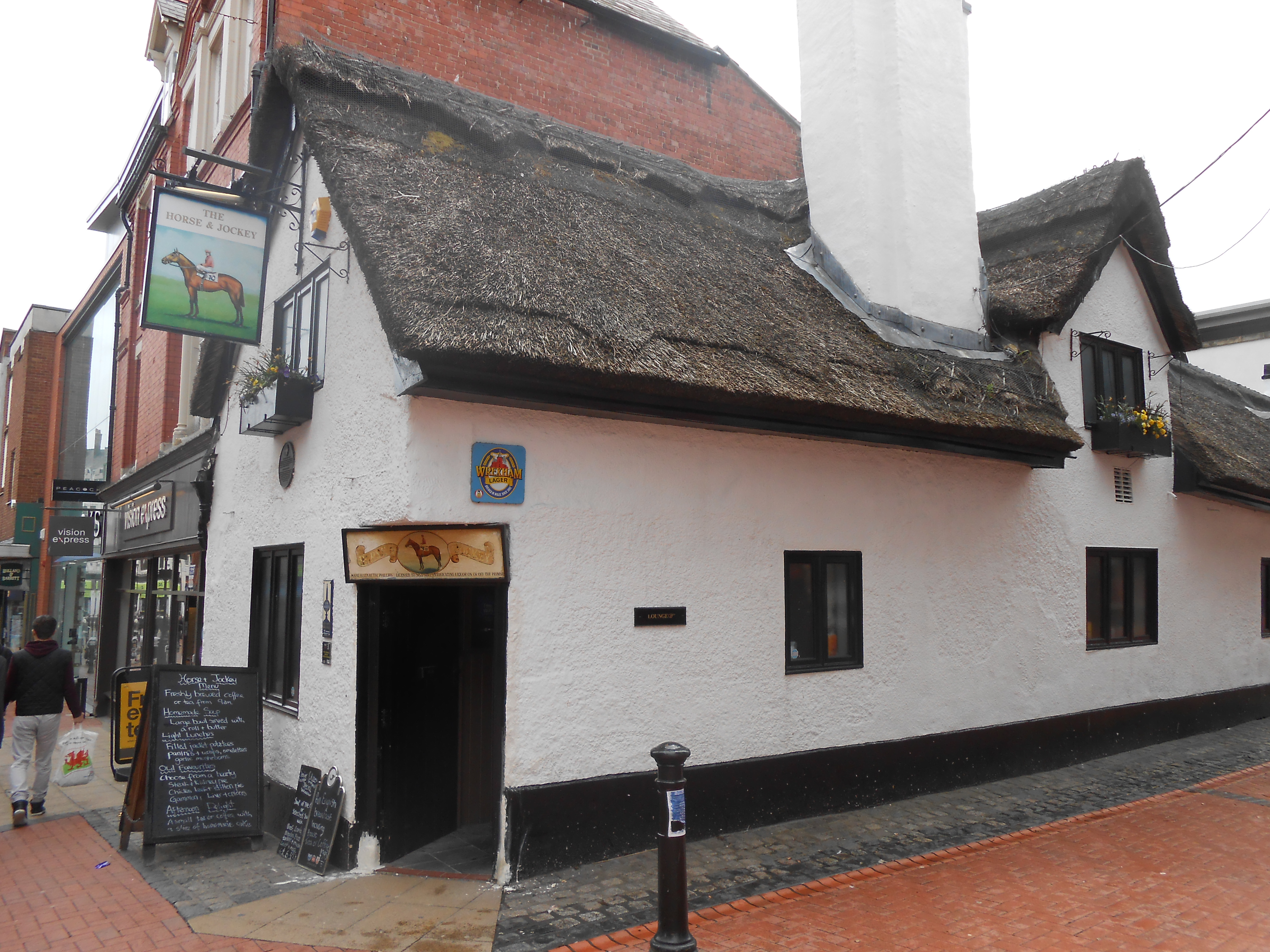
Horse and Jockey public house, possibly built in the 16th century

Wrexham has a number of historic city centre buildings, many of which are pubs but others have been converted into arts or community centres.

- The Horse & Jockey pub on Hope Street
- The Golden Lion on High Street
- The Old Swan on Abbott Street.
- The Wynnstay Arms Hotel on High Street – the Football Association of Wales was formed at the hotel in 1876.
- Tŷ Pawb – A cultural community resource that brings together markets, arts and a food court.
- Saith Seren ("Seven Stars") – a former pub which is now the Wrexham Welsh Centre. The venue is a bilingual community centre but retains its facilities as a pub with local food, a bar, live entertainment, community meeting facilities.
- Wrexham Miners Rescue Station - community, heritage and cafe
- XS Wrexham live music venue - home of M2tm North Wales.

== Economy ==
Wrexham's economy has moved away from heavy industry to high tech manufacturing, bio-technology, finance and professional services. The city also has the largest retail sector in North Wales. In 2007, the then town was ranked fifth in the UK for business start-up success, higher than most larger UK towns and cities.

=== Shopping ===
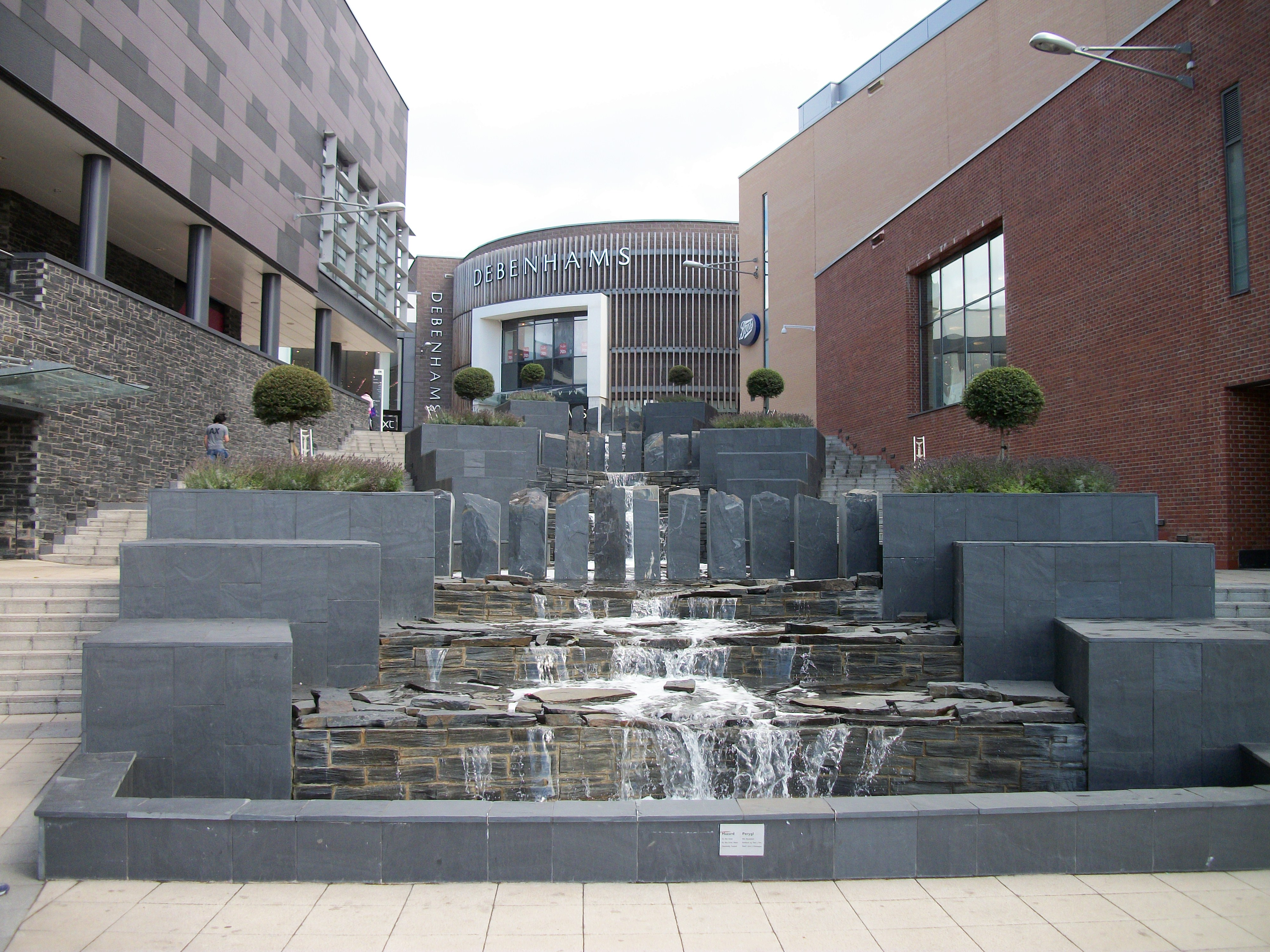
Eagles Meadow shopping centre

There are several shopping streets including Hope Street with major retailers such as New Look, TGJones, Waterstones and Claire's, along with Bank Street with many independent small businesses. Plas Coch and Berse retail parks are on the outskirts close to the A483. Central and Island Green retail parks are in the city centre. Eagles Meadow is a shopping and leisure development in the city, and contains branches of major chain stores and an Odeon Cinema; the development is connected to Yorke Street and High Street by a bridge. There are two traditional covered markets (General and Butchers) plus an open-air market on Mondays and further market stalls in Tŷ Pawb.

Wrexham has a Shopmobility service which is free. Much of the Wrexham city centre is pedestrianised.

=== Finance and professional services ===
Wrexham is home to DTCC, which collates and analyses company information for investment banks and financial organisations.

Moneypenny is an outsourced communications service, serving clients throughout the United Kingdom, and in the United States. Their headquarters are based at the Western Gateway site in Wrexham.

The Development Bank of Wales signed a lease for its new headquarters in Wrexham based on the Wrexham Technology Park, which is expected to accommodate 50 jobs.

Chetwood Financial is a fintech lender that acquired a full banking licence in 2018, the only new retail bank to secure a licence in 2018.

=== Industries ===
Wrexham Industrial Estate is one of the largest industrial areas in Europe and is home to over 340 businesses creating employment for over 10,000 people. The estate currently extends to over 550 hectares and is home to major manufacturing businesses in a range of sectors including automotive, aerospace, food, pharmaceutical and engineering.

Wrexham Industrial Estate is home to a number of biopharmaceutical companies such as Wockhardt and Ipsen which have major sites which provide research and development and manufacturing capabilities. The Industrial estate also hosts a 2,100 capacity Category C male prison, costing £212 million, which was built on the former Firestone Site. The prison opened in March 2017, and was named in February 2016 as HM Prison Berwyn.

Wrexham's close location to both aerospace (Airbus are located in nearby Broughton) and automotive manufacturers have led to a number of organisations being in the city. JCB on the Wrexham Industrial Estate, ACT and Magellan Aerospace are all major employers in the area.

Large food manufacturing sites include Kelloggs, Cadbury, Rowan Foods and Village Bakery. Electronics companies Sharp and Brother have manufacturing facilities located along the A483.

One of Wrexham's traditional industries is brewing. Wrexham was once home to Marstons, Border Breweries and Wrexham Lager. Wrexham is still a brewing town, however, on a smaller scale, many are either located on Wrexham Industrial Estate and in the city centre, this includes Big Hand, Magic Dragon, Erddig, Sandstone, Beech Avenue, Axiom and the revival of Wrexham Lager Beer.

=== Residential development ===
The central area of Wrexham has also seen a number of purpose-built residential developments as well as conversions of older buildings to residential use. Outside the city centre new estates are being developed in several areas, including over 500 homes at the former Brymbo Steelworks site, a ribbon of development on Mold Road leading out of the city (which includes four development companies) and Ruthin Road (Wrexham Western Gateway). There are further plans. These include the development of National Trust land at Erddig for over 250 homes. This latter proposal generated many protests, particularly from residents of nearby Rhostyllen. A motion at the NT's 2008 AGM to block the development gained much support but was overturned by proxy votes cast by the chairman.

== Demography ==
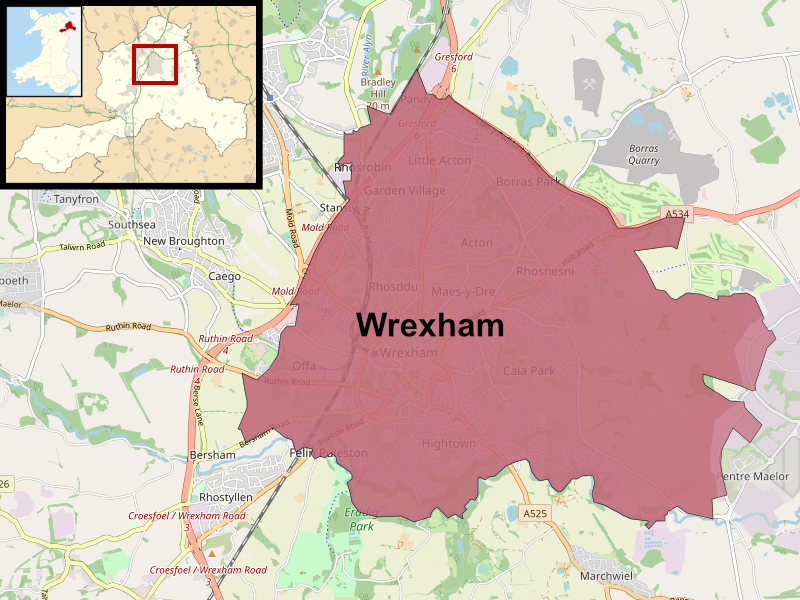
Wrexham's built up area (2021 definition) in red

The Wrexham built up area as defined by the Office for National Statistics (ONS) for the 2021 census had a population of 44,785. Making it Wales' seventh largest built-up area (although fourth among those that are cities), and the largest in North Wales.

For the previous 2011 census, the ONS identified a wider Wrexham built-up area with a population of 65,692, which comprised three built up area subdivisions called Wrexham (population 61,603), Rhostyllen (2,766) and Bradley (1,323). The Wrexham subdivision based on the 2011 census was larger than the Wrexham built up area based on the 2021 census; notable differences between those two definitions are that Brynteg and Gwersyllt have been classed as separate built up areas in 2021.

According to the 2011 census, the average percentage of Welsh speakers (aged 3+) in Wrexham County Borough was 12.9%, compared to the Wales average of 19.0%. The highest proportion was in the rural Dyffryn Ceiriog division (31.2%) and the lowest in the urban Wynnstay division (7.7%).

In January 2015, it was estimated more than 2,000 Portuguese migrants live and work in the city, mainly centred in the district of Hightown. The community holds an annual carnival through the city centre.

A Polish community exists in the city with a number of Polish supermarkets and restaurants in the city centre.

== Culture ==
The Wrexham Community & Culture Trust is leading a bid to make Wrexham the UK City of Culture for 2029, building on the city reaching the final four bids of twenty for the 2025 title.

=== Performing arts ===
A company of actors (anterliwtwyr) from Wrexham is recorded as appearing in Shrewsbury in Henry VIII's reign.

The then town is referenced in the late-Jacobean Beaumont and Fletcher play, 'The pilgrim' (1647), in which the stock Welshman declares that "Pendragon was a shentleman, marg you, Sir, and the organs at Rixum were made by revelations".

Wrexham hosted the National Eisteddfod in 1888, 1912, 1933, 1977, 2011 and 2025, as well as an unofficial National Eisteddfod event in 1876. The 2025 festival is thought to have attracted over 150,000 visitors and 6,000 competitors to the site on the eastern outskirts of town. Locally-born actor Mark Lewis Jones served as the event's president.

Wrexham has a number of theatres, including the Grove Park Theatre on Hill Street, and the Yale Studio theatre close to Llwyn Isaf, with others at Wrexham University on Mold Road and at Coleg Cambria. There is a multi-screen Odeon cinema in the Eagles Meadow development.

=== Visual arts ===
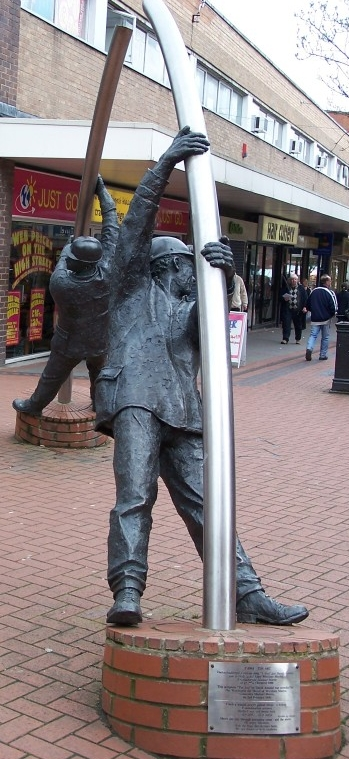
The Arc sculpture

Tŷ Pawb (formerly Oriel Wrecsam and the People's Market) is Wrexham's largest facility for visual arts and exhibitions, and offers other resources including an indoor market, food court and performance spaces. Tŷ Pawb is Welsh for "Everybody's House" and the name was selected by public vote in 2017. Tŷ Pawb was the lead organisation for Wales in the Venice Biennale 2019.

Wrexham's School of Creative Arts (part of Wrexham University and formerly known as North Wales School of Art and Design or NWSAD) is based on Regent Street.

=== Music ===
Live music venues have developed around the core of the city. Further out of the centre other venues provide live music shows. The scene is dominated by local bands, however, mainstream musicians have attended local venues including the Racecourse Ground.

William Aston Hall is the city's largest theatre and concert venue, accommodating up to 1,200 people. It hosts a programme of music and comedy events and is home to the Wrexham Symphony Orchestra. Acts who have performed there include the bands Super Furry Animals, Feeder, The Sweet and The Royston Club, as well as comedians Sarah Millican, Katherine Ryan and Jimmy Carr. Named after a businessman and local politician, the venue is located on the Wrexham University campus and operated by Theatr Clwyd.

Central Station opened in 1999, the venue had a capacity of approximately 650, attracting a number of international acts. Shortly after its rebrand to Live Rooms Wrexham, it was found to be under financial pressures and closed on 9 February 2019, the year that marked its 20th anniversary. The venue re-opened in 2022 as The Rockin' Chair with local band The Royston Club as the opening act.

The first known concert to be held at the Racecourse Ground was in the 1970s with live performances from KC and the Sunshine Band, Mac and Katie Kissoon and Junior Walker. In 2016 the Racecourse Ground re-introduced live music to its summer schedule, the Welsh band Stereophonics were the first musicians to play a live show since the festival with Motörhead in 1982. After the success of Stereophonics with special guests Catfish and the Bottlemen came 2017 with live music from UB 40 and Olly Murs. In June 2018 the Stereophonics returned to the Racecourse Ground alongside special guest Jake Bugg. In May 2023, Kings of Leon headlined shows at the Racecourse Ground.

FOCUS Wales is a festival that began in 2010 to showcase musicians from Wales and around the world using venues across the city. FOCUS Wales includes interactive sessions and celebrates the arts of the region and beyond.

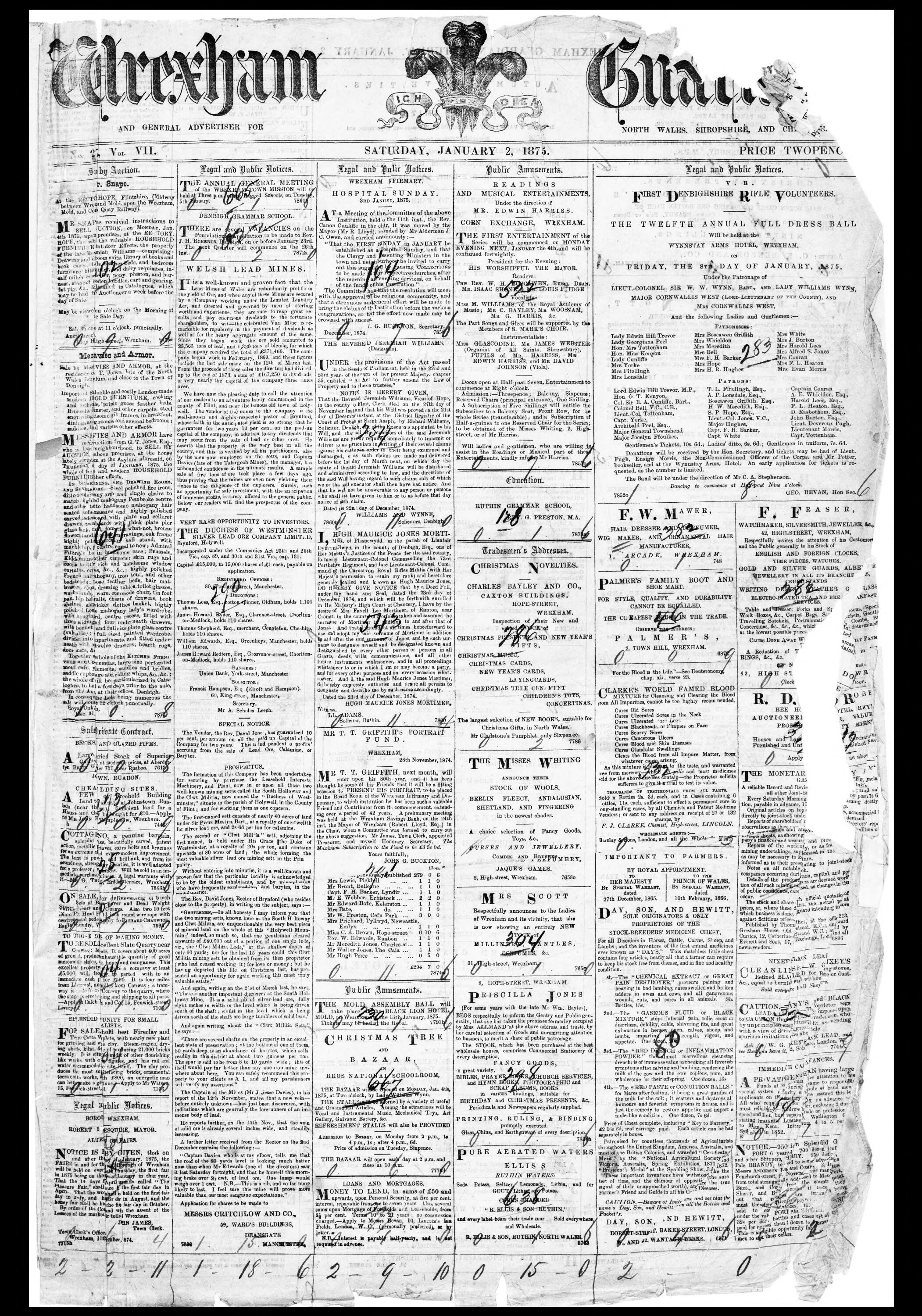
Front page of the Wrexham Guardian; 2 January 1875

=== Media ===
Wrexham's newspapers include two daily titles, Reach plc's Daily Post run remotely, and Newsquest's The Leader (formerly Wrexham Evening Leader) run from Mold, closing their Wrexham office in 2018.

The Leader, Wrexham edition, has a circulation of 1,780, and the Daily Post has a circulation of 6,843 but covers all of North Wales.

Two commercial radio stations used to broadcast from the Wrexham area – Communicorp station Heart North and Mid Wales and Global Radio-owned Capital North West and Wales, and a third station, Capital Cymru (serving Anglesey and Gwynedd). However, the studios in Gwersyllt were closed in January 2025 and are now vacant.

BBC Cymru Wales has a studio and newsroom for radio, television and online services based at Glyndŵr University on Mold Road. From March 2008 to January 2021, the university was also the base for Calon FM, a community radio station that served Wrexham however the licence transferred from Wrexham Community Broadcasting CIC to Premier Radio CIC in April 2025.

Wrexham City Radio, formerly Premier Radio, is based in Eagles Meadow.

An online news website covering the Wrexham area, Wrexham.com, has operated from offices on Yorke Street in the city centre since 2012.

== Parks and open spaces ==
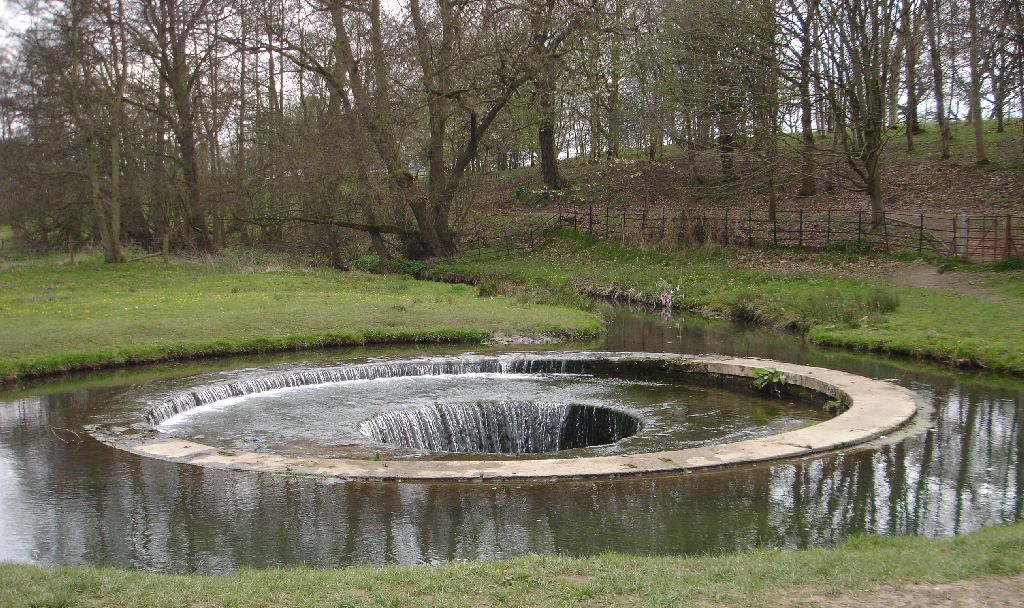
'Cup and Saucer' at Erddig Park

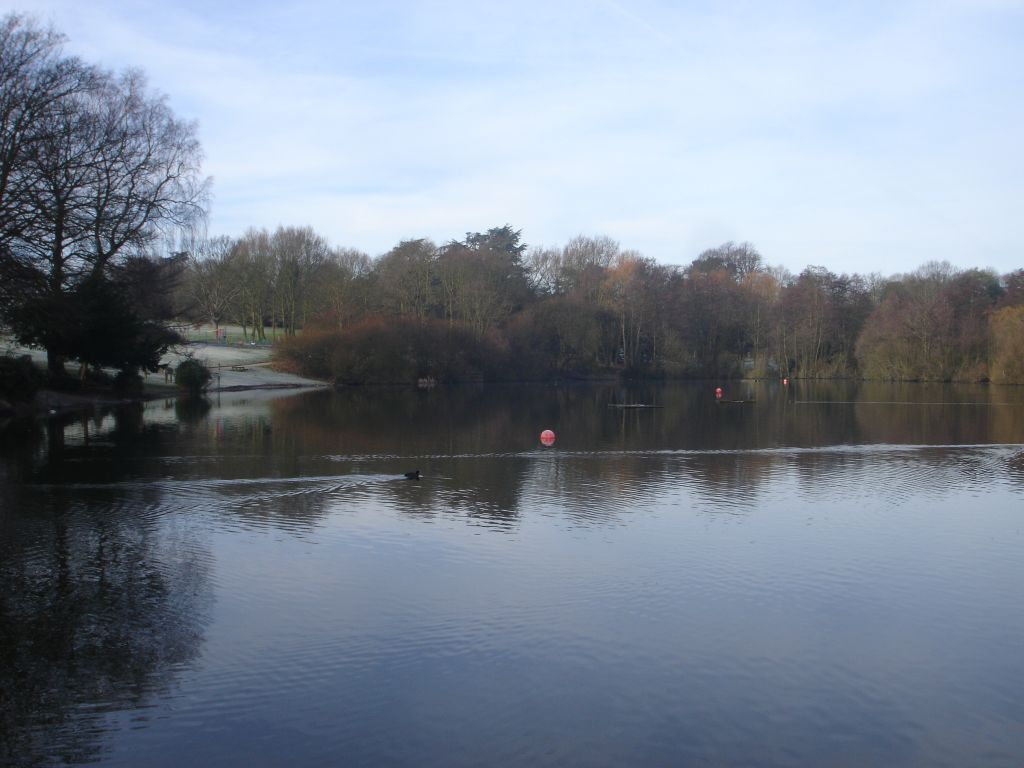
Lake at Acton Park

A total of 37 parks and green spaces in Wrexham County Borough Council ownership have been, or are in the process of being, legally protected with green space charity Fields in Trust ensuring they can never be built on, nor lost to development.

Wrexham has three parks, Bellevue Park, Acton Park and the parkland at Erddig, as well as a green area within the city centre called Llwyn Isaf.

Bellevue Park was built alongside the old cemetery on Ruabon Road. The park was designed to commemorate the jubilee year of the incorporation of Wrexham. It became neglected during the 1970s and many of the amenities were in a poor state of repair. A major project was undertaken to restore the park to its original state. The park reopened in June 2000. In 2015 Belle Vue Park was dedicated as a Fields in Trust Centenary Field because of its links with veterans of two world wars.

Acton Park was originally the landscaped grounds of Acton Hall. It was laid out in 1785 by James Wyatt on the instructions of the owner Sir Foster Cunliffe.

Llwyn Isaf, situated alongside Wrexham Guildhall, is a popular green area within the city centre. The green was originally the landscaped grounds of a mansion house known as Llwyn Isaf. It now lies at the centre of Wrexham's civic centre just off Queens Square. The Welsh Children in Need concert was held here in 2005, which included Bryan Adams and Katherine Jenkins.

Erddig Park is two miles (3 km) south of the city centre where the city meets the Clywedog Valley. The park is owned and managed by the National Trust, and is home to Erddig Hall and its formal gardens.

== Sport ==
=== Football ===
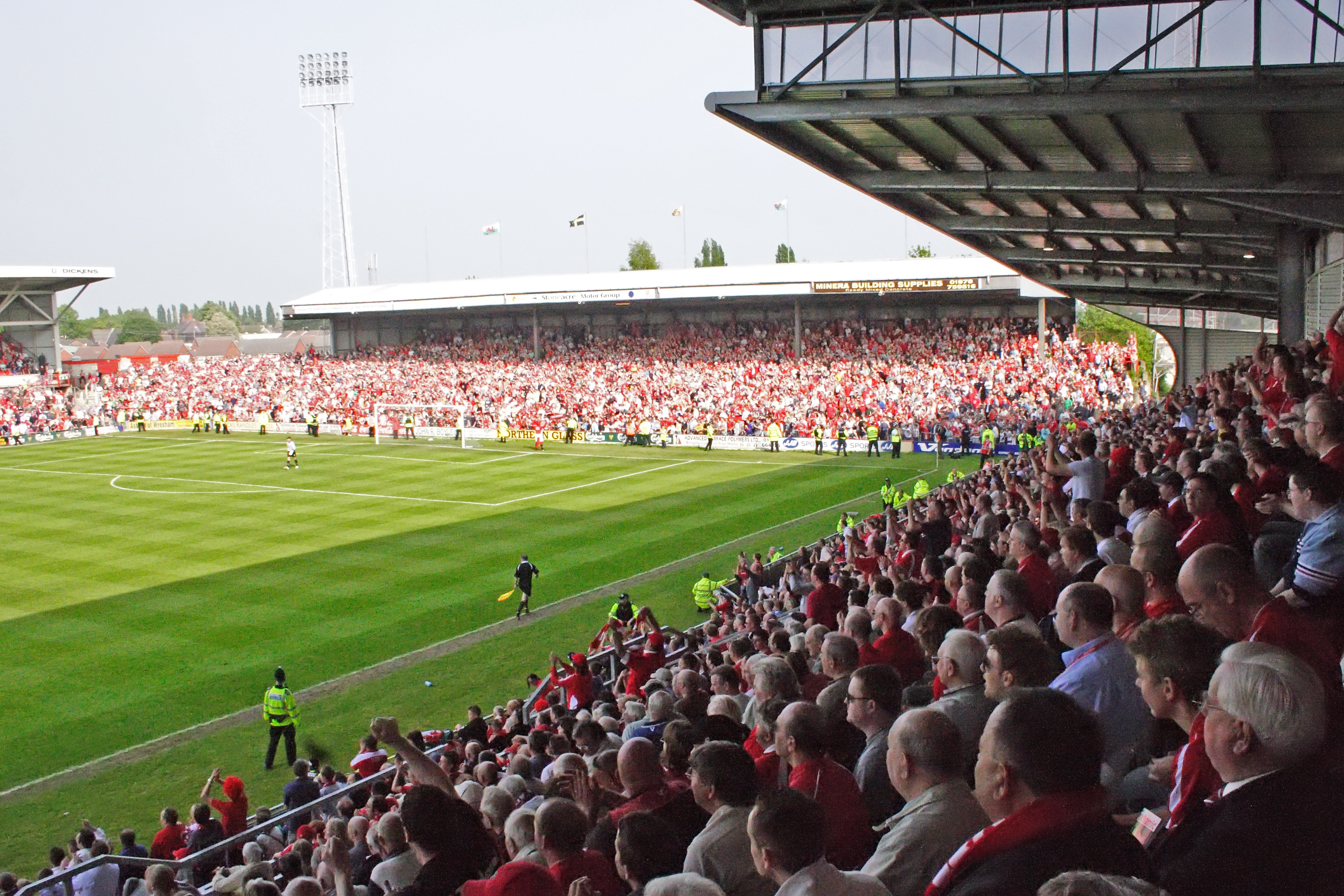
The Racecourse Ground, home of Wrexham A.F.C.

The city has a professional football team, Wrexham A.F.C., the oldest football club in Wales. Their home ground is the Racecourse Ground, the oldest international football ground in the world.

Wrexham was the site of the headquarters of the Football Association of Wales from its formation in 1876 until relocation to Cardiff in 1991.

Colliers Park has received a substantial investment to improve the facility, which was financed by FAW Wales and now recognised as a National Development Centre, complementing their existing facility in Newport.

On 16 November 2020, it was confirmed that actors Ryan Reynolds and Rob McElhenney, through the RR McReynolds Company LLC, would be taking over the club after receiving the backing of the Wrexham Supporters Trust.

=== Rugby league ===
In 2010, Wrexham became the new home of Celtic Crusaders rugby league club spending their final two of three seasons in the Super League – the top tier of the British rugby league system. Following the end of the 2011 season, the club entered administration. A phoenix club was readmitted as North Wales Crusaders into the third tier Championship 1. In 2016, the club moved to the Queensway Stadium in Caia Park as a result of lower matchday attendance, before moving to Colwyn Bay in 2021. The city has also hosted ten matches of the Wales national rugby league team.

=== Rugby union ===
The Racecourse Ground has in the past also served as the secondary home of the Scarlets, one of the four Welsh professional rugby union sides that compete in the Pro14. The Wales rugby union team have also played there on occasion. Wrexham is also home to rugby union team Wrexham RFC, a team affiliated to the Welsh Rugby Union. In 1931 nine northern Welsh clubs met at Wrexham to form the North Wales Rugby Union, Wrexham RFC were one of the founders. Rhos Rugby Club, one of Wrexham RFC's main rivals are also based just outside the city in the village of Rhosllanerchrugog. Rhos now have grown to match Wrexham's quality, making the rivalry even more intense than in previous years.

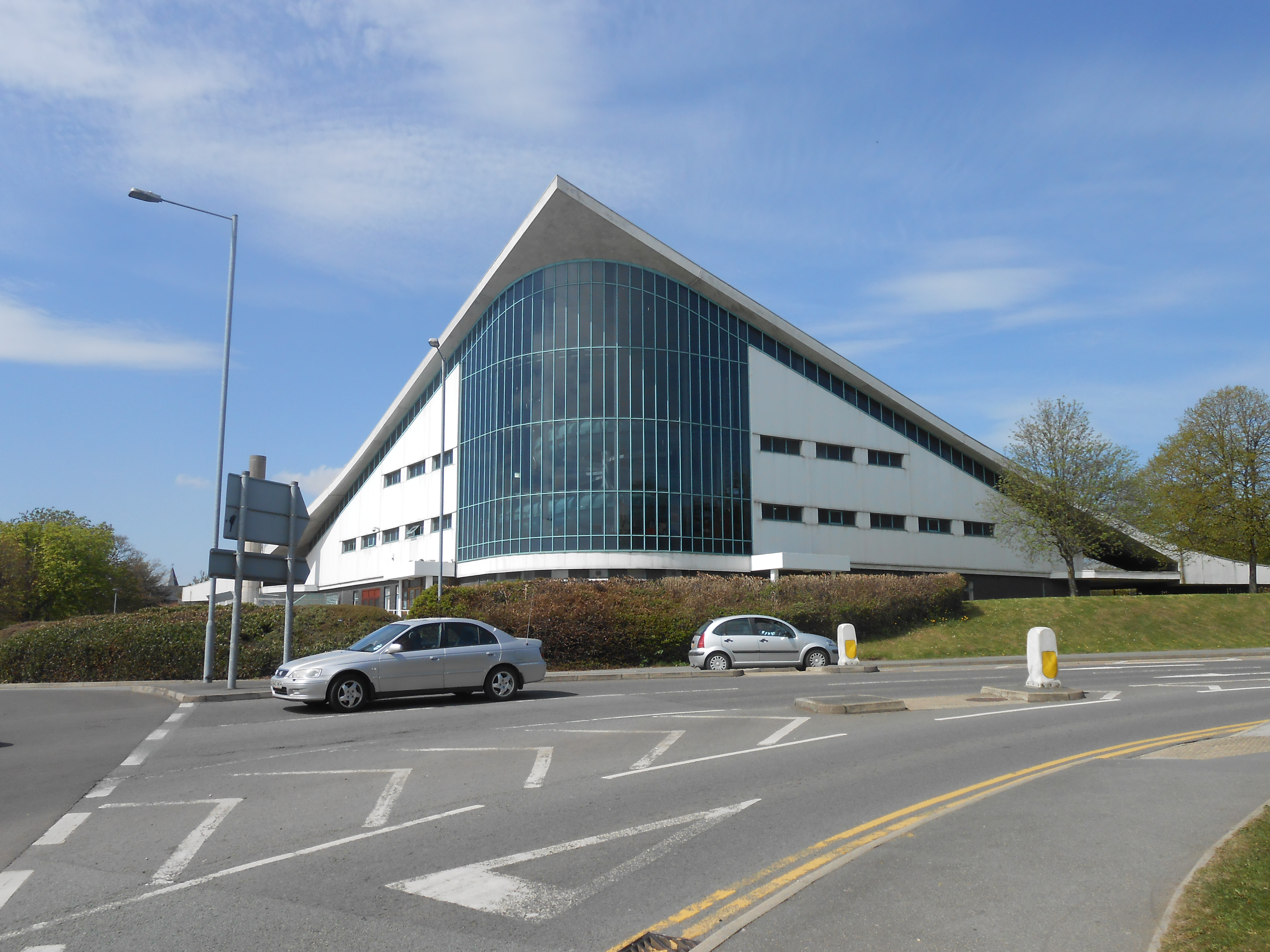
Wrexham Swimming Baths

=== Other sports ===
- Athletics – Queensway International Athletics stadium in Caia Park is Wrexham's second stadium after the Racecourse and has hosted the Welsh Open Athletics event in recent years. The stadium is also home to North Wales' largest athletics club, Wrexham Amateur Athletics Club. From 2017 it is home to rugby league side North Wales Crusaders.
- Hockey – Plas Coch is home to the North Wales Regional Hockey Stadium, home of Wrexham Glyndwr HC, with seating for 200 spectators and floodlighting.
- Leisure centres – Wrexham has 7 leisure centres: Chirk, Clywedog, Darland, Gwyn Evans(Gwersyllt), Plas Madoc, Queensway and Waterworld, which offer activities including swimming, aerobics, climbing walls and yoga.
- Tennis – Wrexham is home to the North Wales Regional Tennis Centre, which plays host to a number of international competitions each year including the Challenger Series. The centre is a pay and play facility and is open 7 days a week to all members of the public. The centre is also home to the WLTA (Wrexham Lawn Tennis Association).
- Golf – Wrexham has 4 golf courses: Moss Valley Golf Club, Plassey Golf Club, Wrexham Golf Club and Clays Farm Golf Club.

== Religion ==
=== Parish Church of St. Giles ===
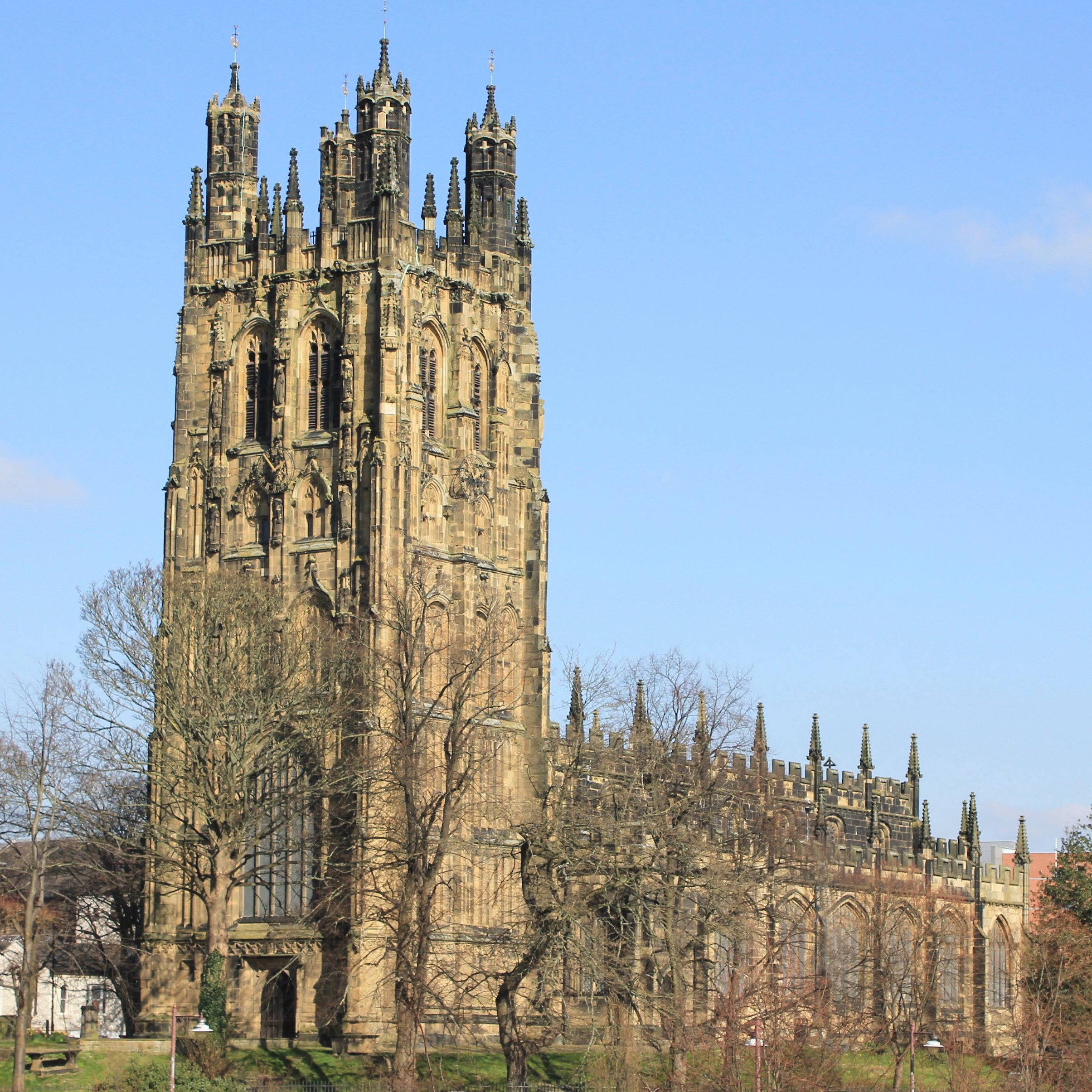
St Giles' Church, considered the greatest example of Gothic architecture in Wales

St. Giles is the Anglican parish church of Wrexham and is considered to be the greatest medieval church in Wales. It includes a colourful ceiling of flying musical angels, two early eagle lecterns, a window by the artist Edward Burne-Jones and the Royal Welch Fusiliers chapel. In the graveyard is the tomb of Elihu Yale who was the benefactor of Yale University in New Haven, Connecticut, United States and after whom Yale College Wrexham is named. As a tribute to Yale and his resting place, a scaled-down replica of the church tower, known as Wrexham Tower was constructed at Yale University. The tower appears in an 18th-century rhyme, as one of the Seven Wonders of Wales. In 2015, a first edition (1611) of the King James Bible (also known as the Authorized Version) was discovered in a cabinet by the Vicar of the parish.

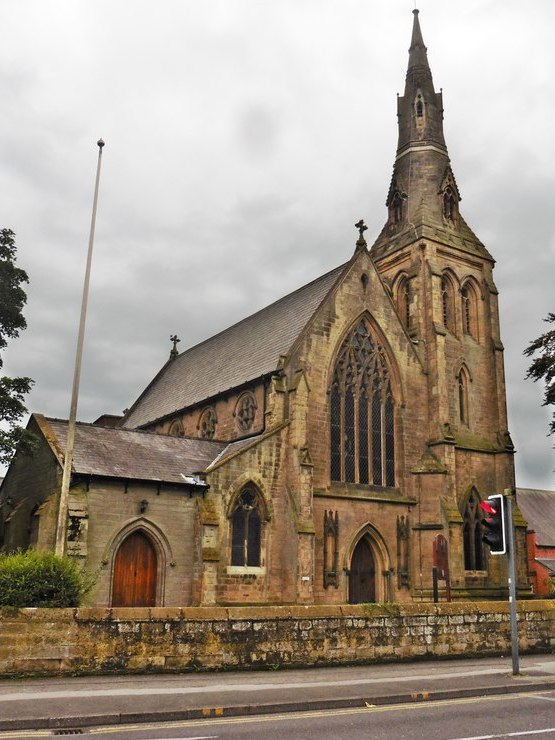
St Mary's Cathedral, Wrexham

=== St. Mary's Cathedral ===
The Roman Catholic Cathedral of Our Lady of Sorrows in Regent Street is the main church of the Diocese of Wrexham, which extends over all of North Wales. Built in 1857 after Catholic Emancipation and at the height of the Gothic Revival, the cathedral was home to the Bishop of Menevia from 1898 until 1987, whose diocese covered all of Wales. However, in 1987 the Roman Catholic province of Wales was reconstructed, since which time the cathedral has been home to the Bishop of Wrexham. The cathedral is also home to the relic of Saint Richard Gwyn, Wrexham's patron saint, who was a Roman Catholic martyr in the 16th century. Richard was hanged, drawn and quartered at Wrexham's Beast Market. He was canonised by Pope Paul VI in 1970.

=== Other denominations ===
Wrexham has a number of non-conformist chapels and churches around the city, including a corps of The Salvation Army. The main Methodist church is Wrexham Methodist church, built in 1971 on the site of the former Brynyfynnon Chapel on Regent Street. There is also a Presbyterian church in the city.

Wrexham had a church with a spire dedicated to and named after St. Mark in St. Mark's Road but it was demolished in 1960 after being declared unsafe and in danger of collapse due to inadequate foundations. A multi-storey car park named St. Mark's was erected on the site.

== Education ==
=== Wrexham University ===
Wrexham University was formed when the North East Wales Institute (NEWI) was granted full university status in 2008. It consists of Plas Coch campus in the western part of the city and the North Wales School of Art and Design located on Regent Street. The institution was founded in 1887 as the Wrexham School of Science and Art. It was formerly named after the 14th century scholar and last Welsh Prince of Wales, Owain Glyndŵr, as (Wrexham) Glyndŵr University.

=== Yale College (Coleg Cambria) ===
Yale College (now part of Coleg Cambria) is the main provider of adult education in Wrexham and is one of the largest colleges in Wales. As a tertiary college it also provides a wide range of higher education courses at its two campuses at Grove Park in the city centre and Bersham Road in southwest Wrexham. It was named after Elihu Yale, best known for being the prime benefactor of Yale University. It was founded in 1950 as a state school on a site at Crispin Lane. In 1973, as part of the conversion of local schools to the comprehensive system, it was renamed as Yale Sixth Form College and the pupils re-located to other schools. The Crispin Lane site was incorporated into NEWI (now Glyndŵr University) after the development of the Grove Park Campus.

In 1998, Yale College took up residence in two sites across Wrexham: the faculty of engineering and construction at a site on Bersham Road, and a multi-purpose site in a redeveloped Grove Park campus. In 2013, Yale College was merged with Deeside College, Northop College, and Llysfasi College to form a new college, Coleg Cambria, under the leadership of the ex-Deeside principal David Jones. The merger officially took place on 1 August 2013. For the 2020–21 academic year, the Yale Grove Park Campus in Wrexham city centre underwent redevelopment at a cost of £20 million.

=== Schools ===
Wrexham has a number of primary and secondary schools. It has just one Welsh-speaking secondary school, Ysgol Morgan Llwyd. In 2003, three of the largest secondary schools, St David's School, Ysgol Bryn Offa and The Groves High School were merged to create two larger "super schools", Rhosnesni High School, and Ysgol Clywedog. Other large secondary schools Darland High School and Ysgol Bryn Alyn, were both built in 1958. Wrexham has become home to the first shared-faith school in Wales, St Joseph's.

There are seven Welsh medium primary schools in Wrexham County Borough, two of which are located in Wrexham city (Ysgol Bodhyfryd CP and Ysgol Plas Coch CP). Ysgol Morgan Llwyd serves as the single Welsh medium secondary school for the county and is located in Wrexham.

== Twin municipalities ==
The city of Wrexham is twinned with the German district of Märkischer Kreis and the Polish town of Racibórz.

The first twinning was established on 17 March 1970 between the former Kreis Iserlohn and Wrexham Rural District. Its early success ensured that, after local government reorganisation in both countries in the mid-seventies, the twinning was taken over by the new Councils of Märkischer Kreis and Wrexham Maelor Borough Council and, in 1996, by Wrexham County Borough Council.

In 2001, Märkischer Kreis entered a twinning arrangement with Racibórz (Ratibor), a county in Poland, which was formerly part of Silesia, Germany. In September 2002, a delegation from Racibórz visited Wrexham and began initial discussions about possible co-operation which led, eventually, to the signing of Articles of Twinning between Wrexham and Racibórz in March 2004. The Wrexham area has strong historical links with Poland. Following World War II, many service personnel from the Free Polish armed forces who had been injured received treatment at Penley Polish Hospital. Many of their descendants remain in the area to this day.

== Transport ==
=== Rail ===
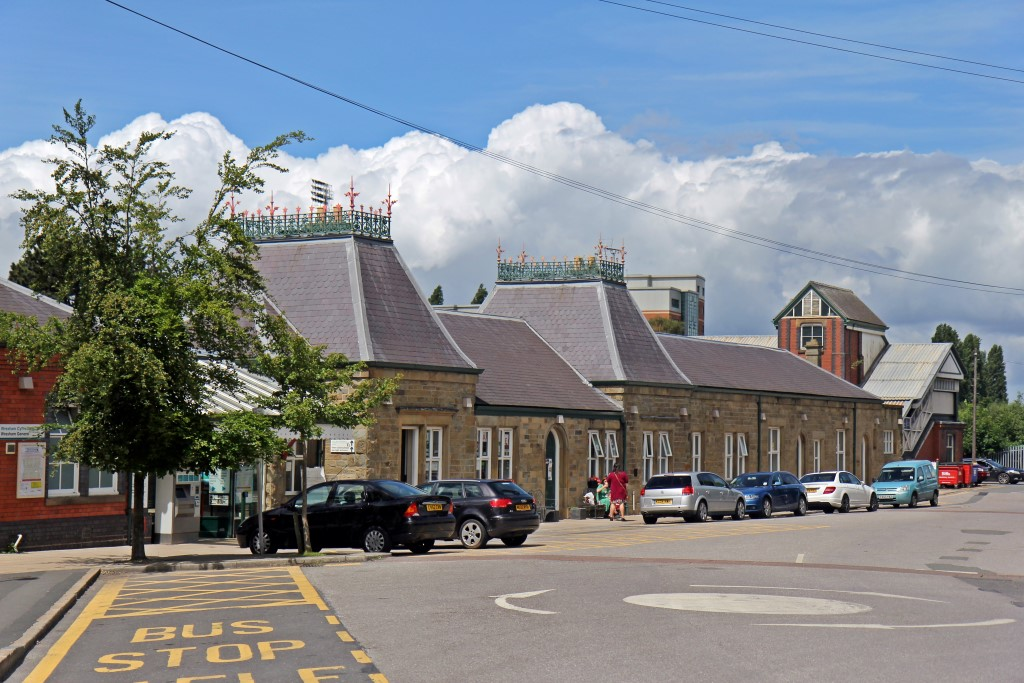
Wrexham General railway station building

Wrexham has two railway stations, Wrexham General and Wrexham Central, with Gwersyllt located in the city's western suburbs. Until the early 1980s what is now platform 4 of Wrexham General, serving the Wrexham Central – Bidston service, was a separate station, Wrexham Exchange. There were plans for two new railway stations named after but located outside the then town in 2017: Wrexham North and Wrexham South.

==== Wrexham General ====
Wrexham General was opened in 1846, rebuilt in 1912 and again in 1997. It has six platforms (four through, two terminal). Wrexham General is on two different lines, the Shrewsbury to Chester Line and the Borderlands Line, both of which are run by Transport for Wales.

Wrexham General was also the base for the former train operating company Wrexham & Shropshire (the operating name of the Wrexham, Shropshire and Marylebone Railway Company). The company-provided passenger train services from Wrexham via Shropshire to London Marylebone on an open-access basis. Services started in 2008, with an agreement for a seven-year period. Wrexham & Shropshire began running services on 28 April 2008. Having decided they could not make the business profitable, the company ended services on 28 January 2011.

All services that operate from Wrexham Central to Bidston also run through this station.

A token Avanti West Coast service runs via Chester and Crewe to London Euston, whereas Transport for Wales operate a few direct services every weekday to Liverpool Lime Street.

==== Wrexham Central ====
Wrexham Central, which is located on the Island Green retail park, is a small terminus station which is the southern terminus of the Wrexham to Bidston in Birkenhead Borderlands Line. Until the 1998 construction of the Island Green retail park, Wrexham Central station was located 50 metres further along the track.

==== Gwersyllt ====
Gwersyllt is an unmanned halt which serves the Gwersyllt suburb of Wrexham. It is a stop on the Borderlands line between Wrexham General and Bidston.

=== Bus ===
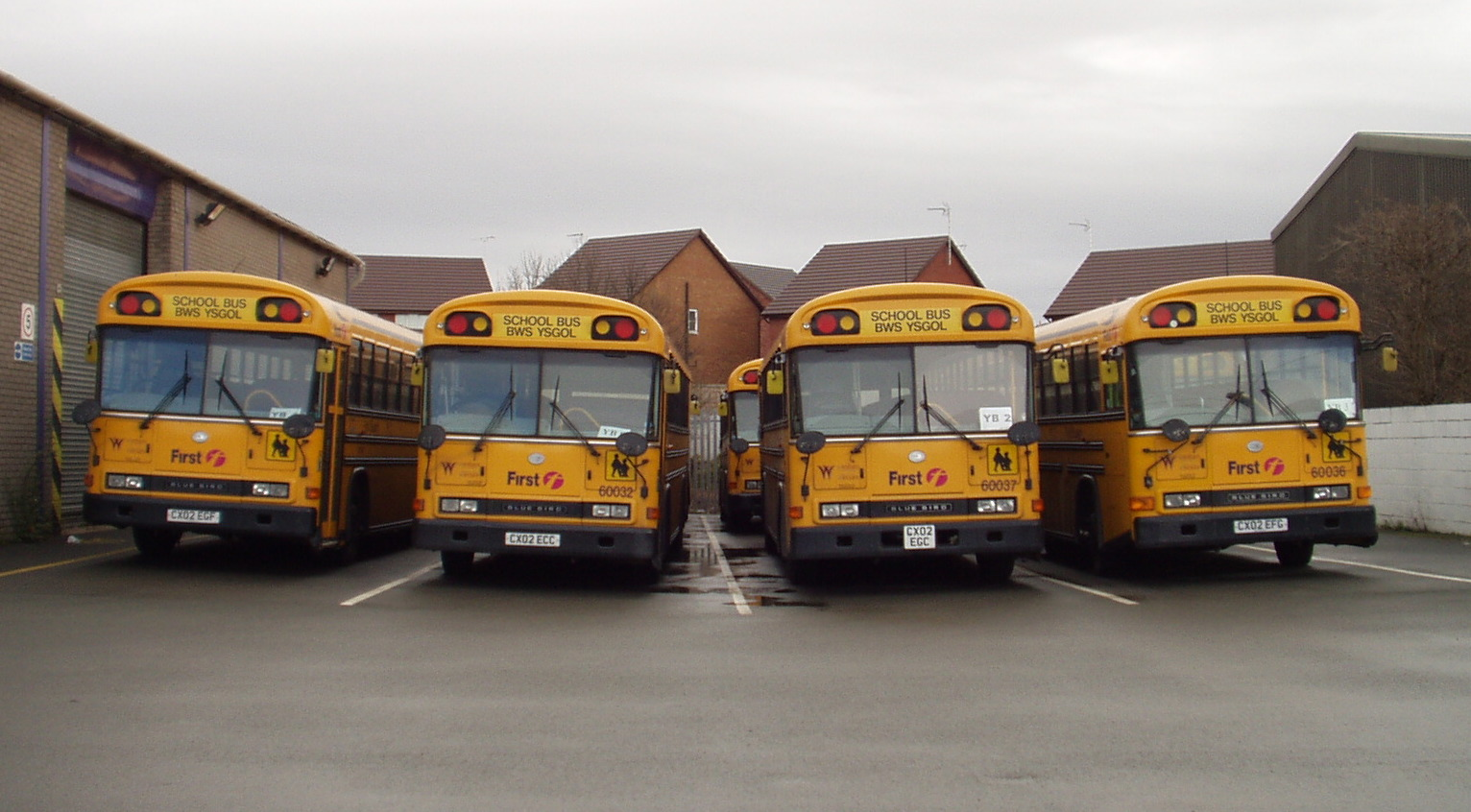
First Chester & The Wirral Yellow School Buses

A bus terminal, the largest in north Wales, has been built in Wrexham, which formerly housed a staffed information booth. The bus station serves local, regional and long-distance bus services. It is served by various bus companies, including Arriva Buses Wales and Stagecoach. Long-distance coaches are available to Edinburgh via Manchester, Bradford and Leeds and to London via Telford and Birmingham. The Wrexham Shuttle provides a link between Wrexham and the nearby industrial estate. The townlink bus connects the main bus station with Eagles Meadow shopping centre and Border retail park to the east and Wrexham General and Central stations with Plas Coch, Wrexham Central and Island Green shopping centres to the south and west of the city. Wrexham is served by the National Express coach network, which picks up from the Wrexham bus station. Wrexham use the distinctive yellow American Bluebird school buses.

=== Roads ===
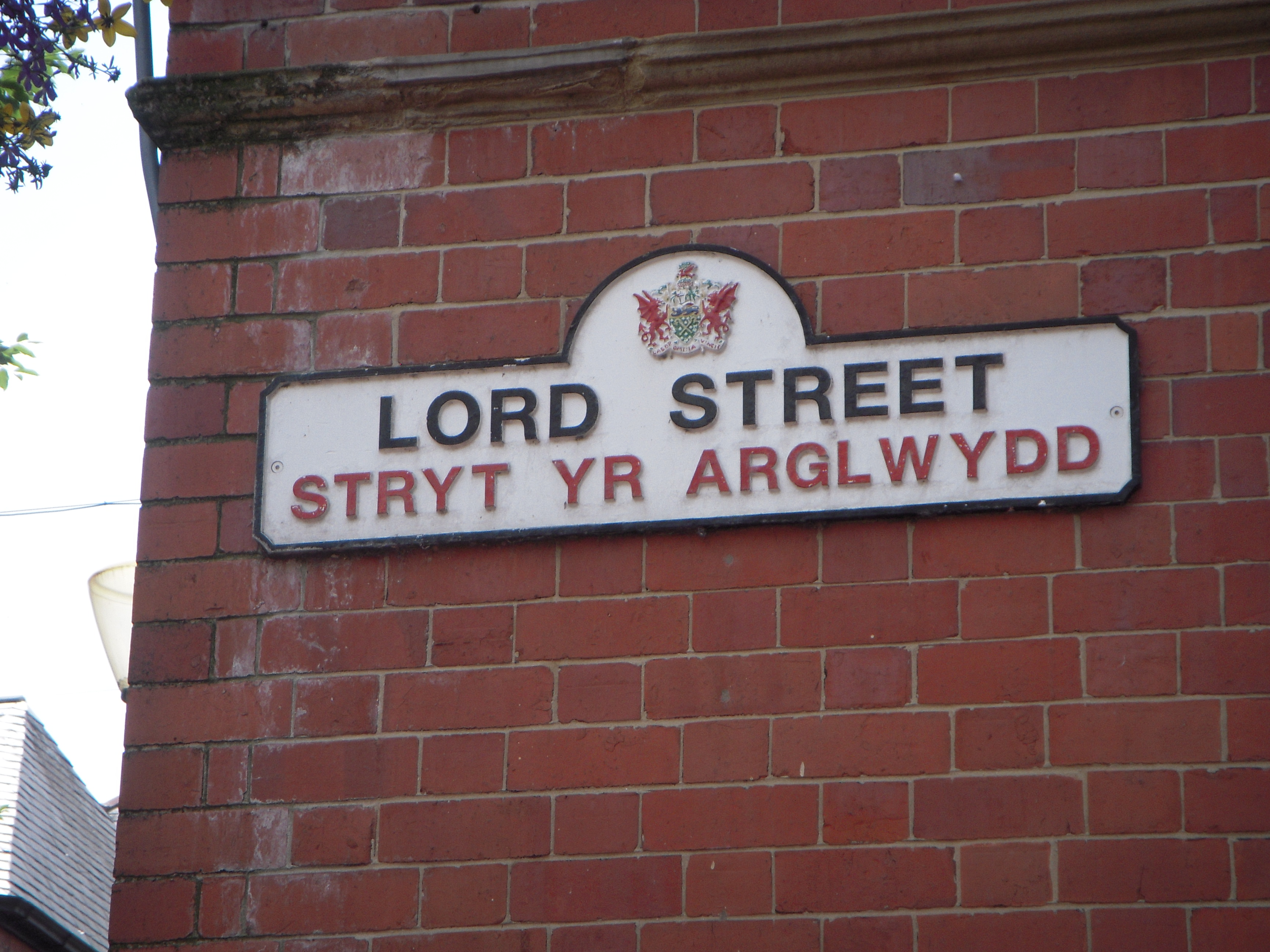
Street sign in English and Welsh: note the spelling of stryd

The city centre is orbited by a ring road. The northern and eastern parts of the road are dualled between Rhosddu Road roundabout and Eagles Meadow. The A483 is Wrexham's principal route. It skirts the western edge of the city, dividing it from the urban villages to the west. The road has connections with major roads (A55(M53), A5(M54)). The A5156 leads to the A534 and on to the Wrexham Industrial Estate. The A541 road is the main route into Wrexham from Mold and the city's western urban area. It connects to the B5101 road which eventually leads to the A5104 road to the east of Treuddyn in Flintshire.

== Future development ==
The Welsh Government has acquired key sites to form part of the Wrexham Gateway Project to redevelop the Kop stand at the Racecourse Ground and upgrade the transportation network to support the upgrade in the sport and event facility.

£5.4 million funding has been agreed for the redevelopment of the Wrexham Museum that will integrate a Welsh Football Museum, which has been dubbed a museum of two halves. The football museum will have a number of themes including Welsh language communities, fan culture, Black, Asian and Minority Ethnic communities and LGBTQ+ experiences.

A health and wellbeing complex at Coleg Cambria is expected to be built by summer 2024 at a cost of £14 million.

Work has started on the regeneration of the historic markets by the contractor SWG. The aim of the project is to bring significant improvements to the grade II-listed General and Butchers markets.

Wrexham University's Enterprise Engineering and Optics Centre (EEOC) funding is now in place with Wynne Construction expected to start on the Plas Coch campus in 2024 forming part of the overall aim to improve the facilities at Wrexham University Plas Coch campus.

The creation of a Ryan Rodney Reynolds memorial park was officially announced on 23 October 2023 it is expected to consist of play facilities, tables and chairs, artworks, street food and a community cinema.

== Notable people ==
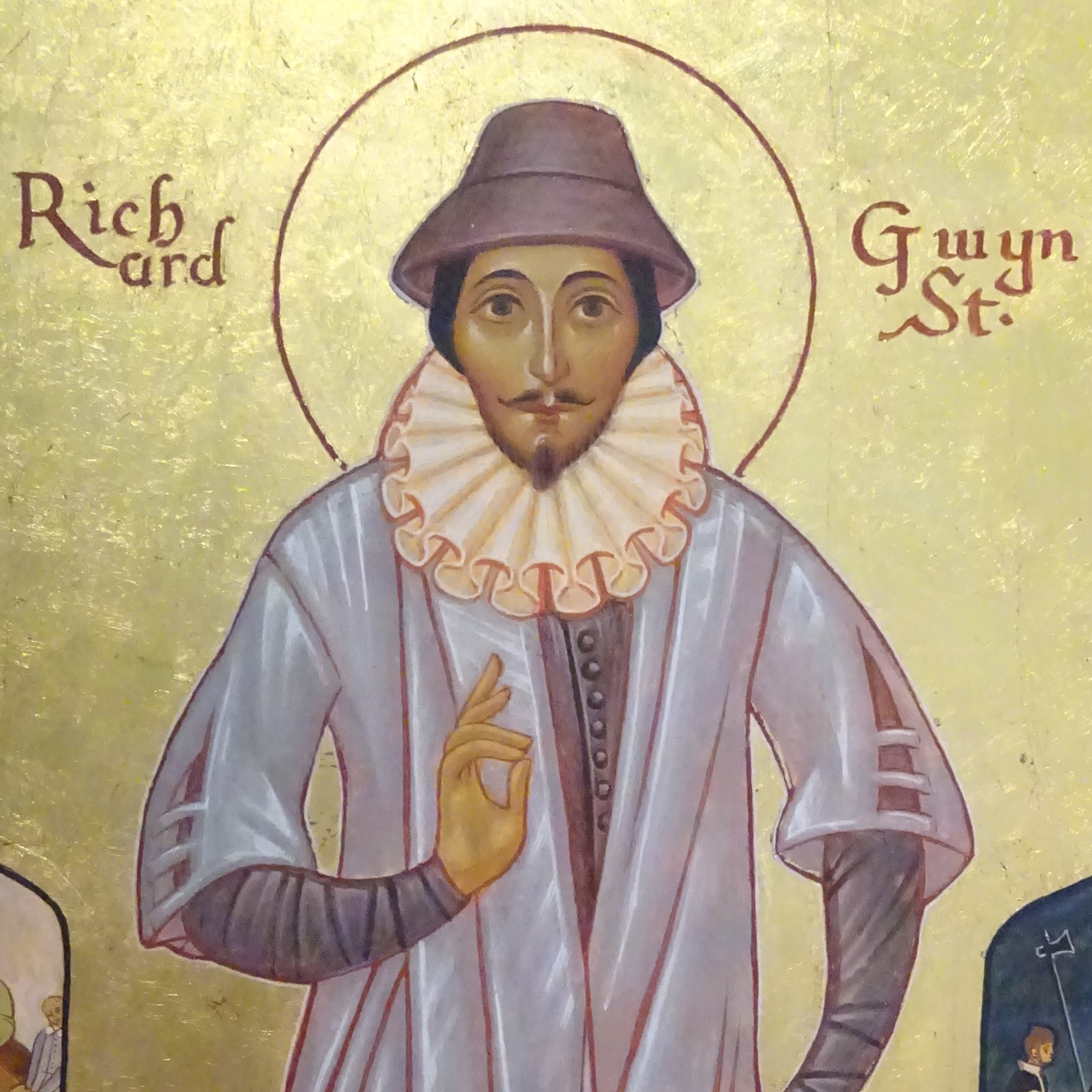
St.Richard Gwyn

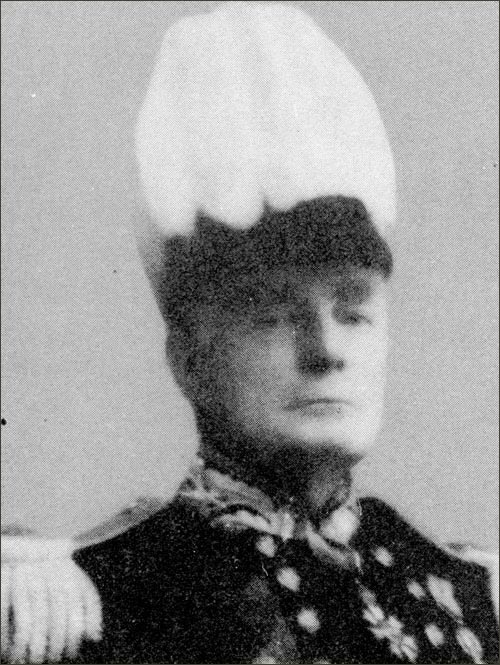
Sir Charles Alexander Harris

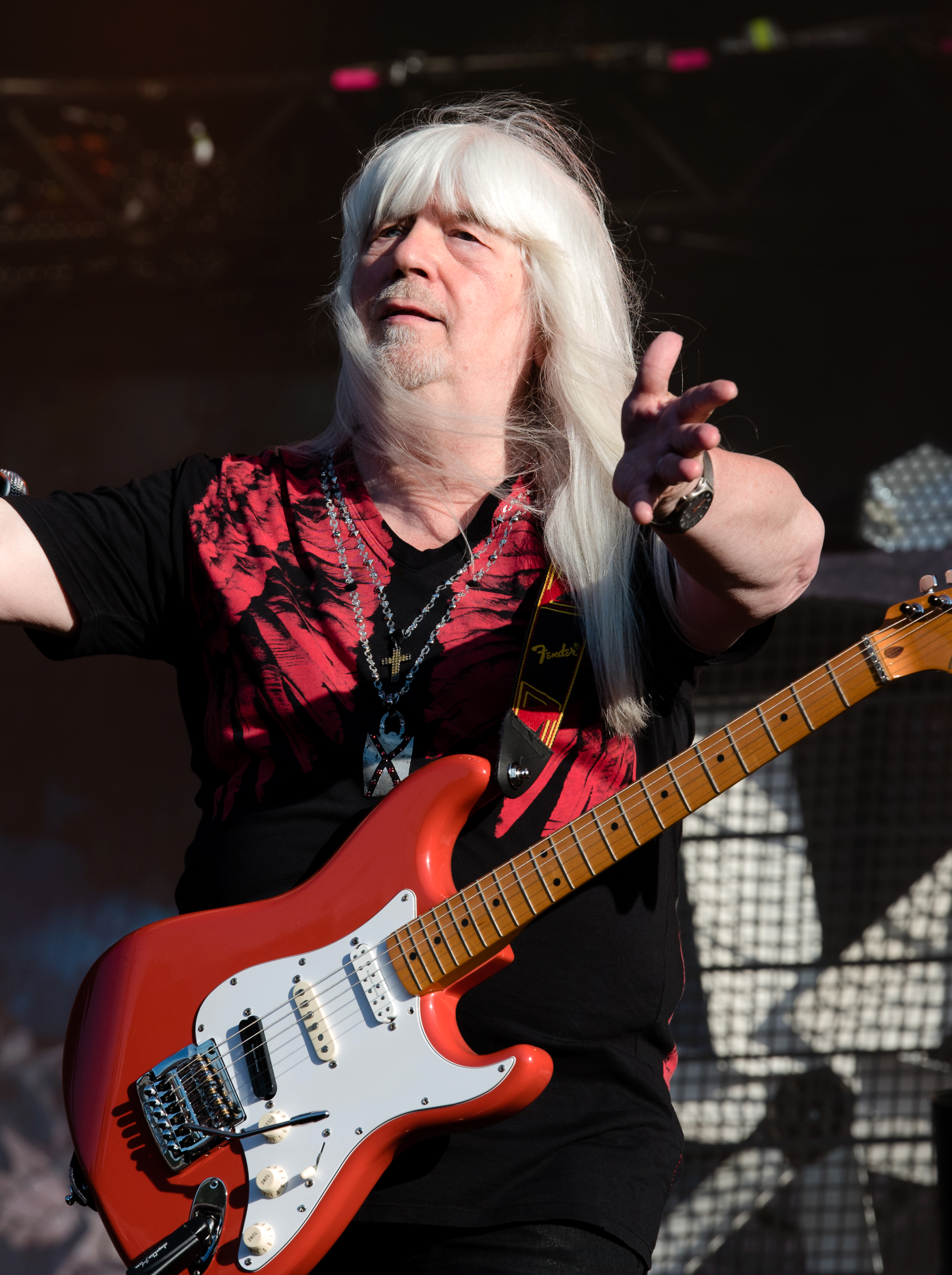
Andy Scott, 2018

- Saint Richard Gwyn (1537–1584), Catholic martyr and patron saint of Wrexham, hung, drawn, and quartered in Wrexham.
- Daniel Williams (ca.1643–1716), a British benefactor, minister and theologian, born in Wrexham.
- George Jeffreys (1645–1689), 'the hanging judge' of Acton Hall in Acton.
- Elihu Yale (1649–1721), businessman and benefactor of Yale University.
- John Yale (d. 1800), reverend, deacon, rector and fellow of St John's College, Cambridge
- John Evans (ca.1680–1730), a Welsh divine, born in Wrexham.
- John "Iron-Mad" Wilkinson (1728–1808), known for the Bersham Ironworks, which later produced cannons for the US civil war.
- Thomas Beach (died 1737), a Welsh poet and wine merchant in Wrexham.
- Philip Yorke (1743–1804), antiquarian, politician and writer, squire of Erddig.
- Robert Waithman (1764–1833), born in Wrexham, became lord mayor of London in 1823.
- Thomas Penson (ca.1790 – 1859), Welsh architect and county surveyor.
- Samuel Warren (1807–1877), a British barrister, novelist and MP; born at Rackery Farm.
- Edwin Hughes (1830–1927), known as Balaclava Ned, the last survivor of the Charge of the Light Brigade at Balaklava in the Crimea.
- Dr Thomas Eyton-Jones (1832–1893), surgeon, physician, magistrate and mayor of Wrexham in 1875
- Sir Charles Alexander Harris (1855–1947), British colonial administrator from Wrexham & Governor of Newfoundland.
- Dr Harold Drinkwater (1855–1925), physician noted as a botanical artist; moved to Wrexham in 1890.
- Florence Missouri Caton (1875–1917), British nurse who served in Serbia during World War I.
- Brigadier-General Cecil Faber Aspinall-Oglander (1878–1959), military historian, noted for his works WWI; born in Wrexham.
- Charles Harold Dodd (1884–1973), eminent New Testament scholar and influential Protestant theologian.
- Major Sir Hubert Winthrop Young (1885–1950), an English soldier Liberal Party politician, diplomat and colonial governor.
- William Davidson Bissett (1893–1971), Victoria Cross recipient, died locally, cremated at Pentre Bychan.
- Bernard Warburton-Lee (1895–1940), senior officer in the Royal Navy and a recipient of the Victoria Cross, born in Wrexham.
- Lancelot Hogben (1895–1975), zoologist and popularizer of science, died in Wrexham
- Professor Sir Ewart Ray Herbert Jones (1911–2002), chemist, inventor of the Jones oxidation, Waynflete Professor of Chemistry at Oxford University, born in Wrexham.
- David Lord, (1913–1944), holder of the Victoria Cross and Distinguished Flying Cross, brought up in Wrexham
- Jack Mary Ann, local folk hero who lived in the Top Boat House area of Broughton, exploits in the 1920s and 1930s
- John Barnard Jenkins (1933–2020), leader of Welsh nationalist organisation Mudiad Amddiffyn Cymru (MAC); lived and died in Wrexham.
- Charlie Landsborough (born 1941), born in Wrexham, British country and folk musician and singer-songwriter
- Rosemarie Frankland (1943–2000), model and beauty queen, born in Rhosllanerchrugog; won 4 major titles in 1961.
- Andy Scott (born 1949), guitarist with 1970s glam rock band The Sweet
- Jonathan Shanklin (born 1953) is a meteorologist who has worked at the British Antarctic Survey since 1977. Together with Joe Farman and Brian G. Gardiner he discovered the "Ozone Hole" in the 1980s.
- Ian Lucas (born 1960), a former British Labour MP for Wrexham from 2001 to 2019.
- Grahame Davies (born 1964), poet, author and former journalist; raised in the nearby coal mining village of Coedpoeth.
- Guto Bebb (born 1968), born in Wrexham, Welsh politician former MP for Aberconwy from 2010 to 2019.
- Susan Elan Jones (born 1968), former British Labour MP for Clwyd South, comes from Ponciau.
- David Bower (born 1969), deaf actor, born locally, played David, the younger brother of Charles, in the comedy Four Weddings and a Funeral.
- Stephen Evans (born 1970), actor in Hyperdrive (British TV series)
- Tim Vincent (born 1972), former Blue Peter presenter and former Access Hollywood reporter.
- Llŷr Williams (born 1976) Welsh pianist, born in the village of Pentre Bychan; won Outstanding Young Artist Award.
- Mike Williams (born 1979), Welsh journalist, former editor in chief of NME
- Darren Jeffries (born 1982), actor in Hollyoaks, born locally
- Amy Guy (born 1983), a Welsh beauty queen and TV performer, gladiator in TV show 'SIREN'. Member of the British team in horse riding. Miss Wales & Miss World Sport 2004. Miss United Kingdom 2005.

=== Sport ===
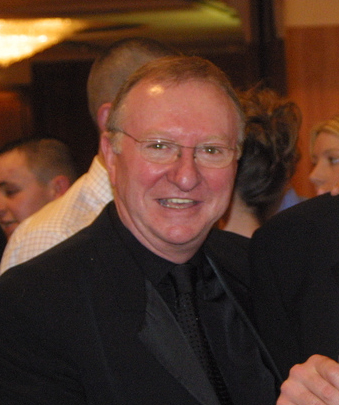
Dennis Taylor, 2004

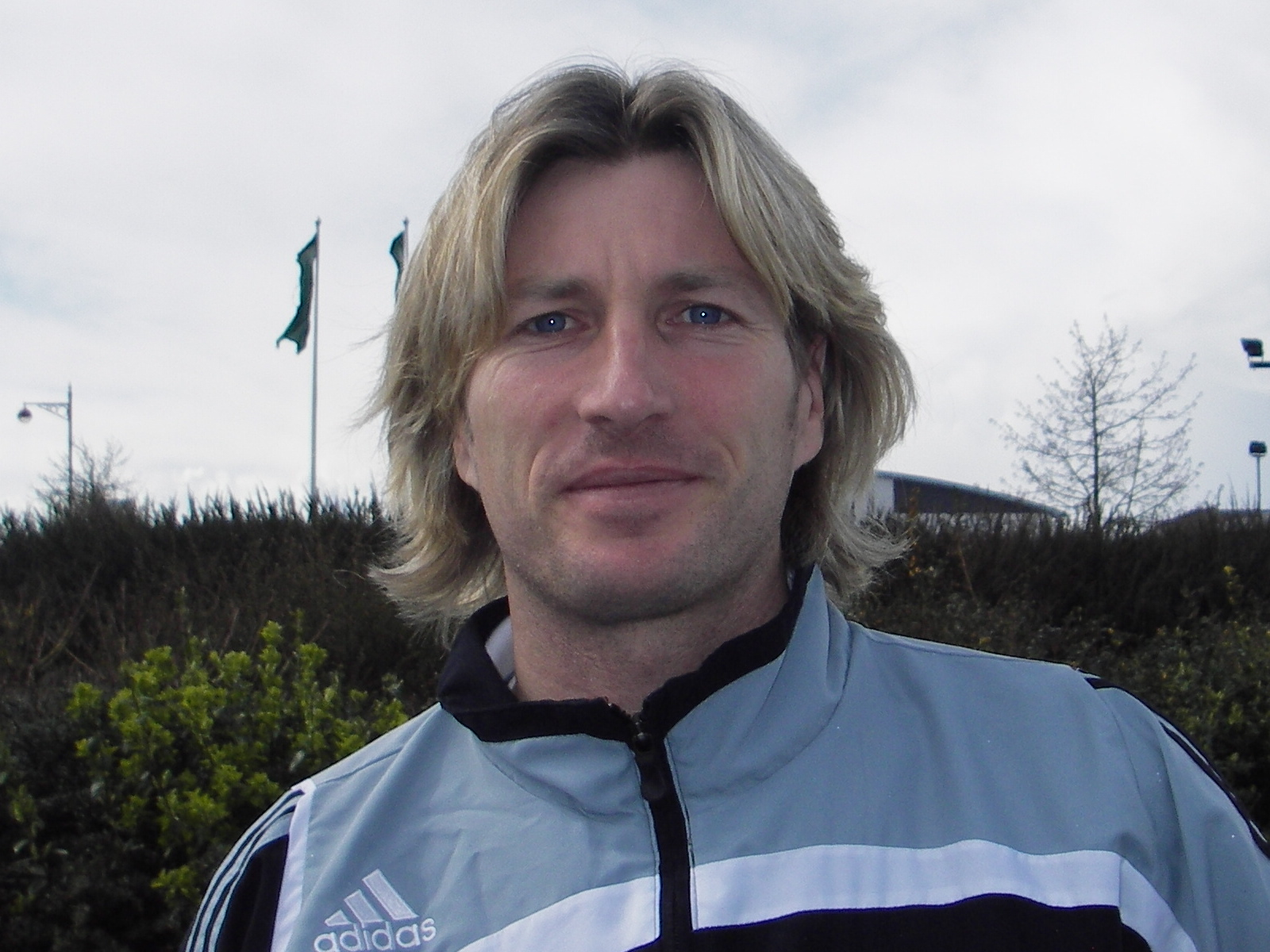
Robbie Savage, 2008

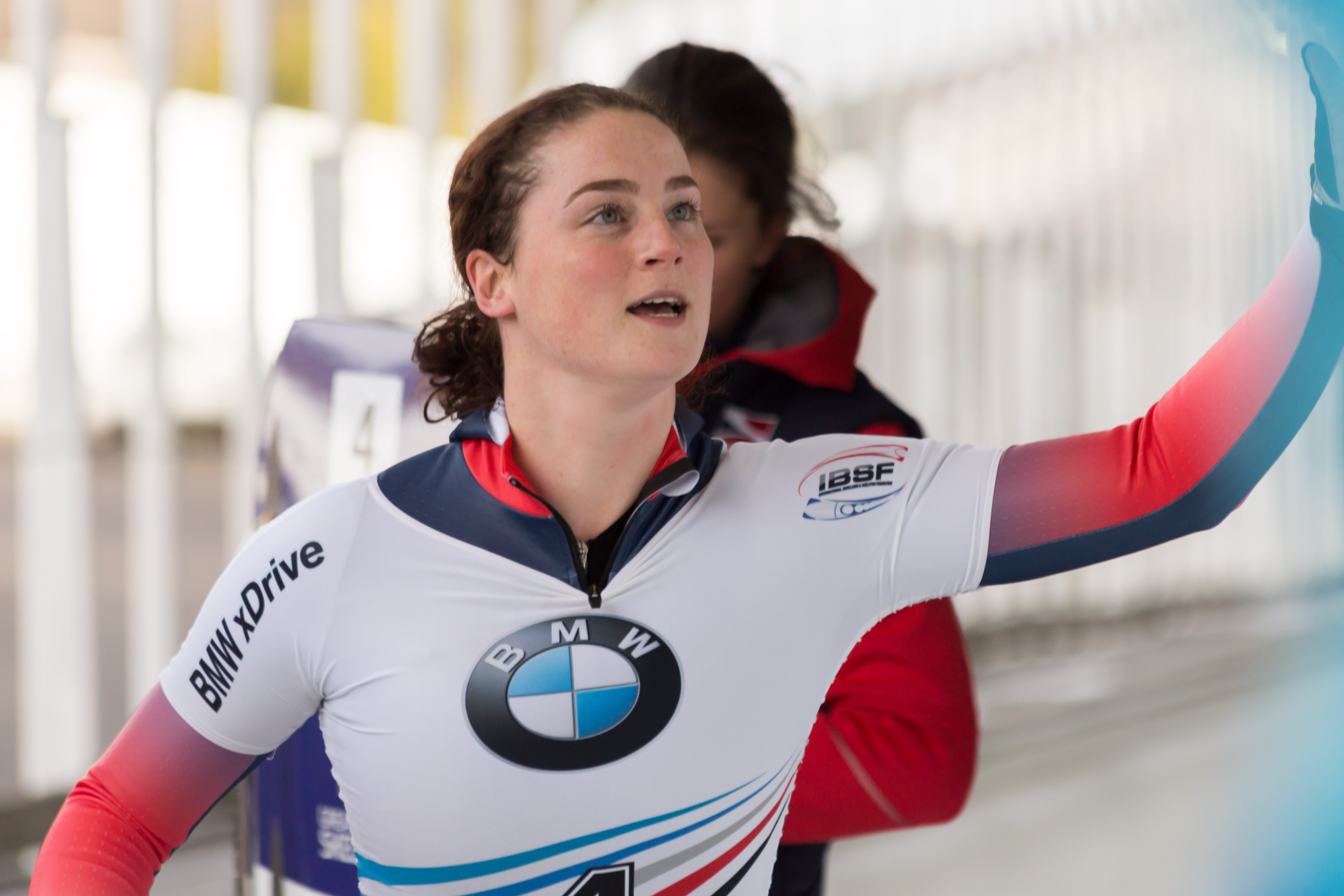
Laura Deas, 2017

- Charles James Apperley (1777–1843), sportsman and sporting writer known as Nimrod, came from Wrexham.
- Major Sir William Lloyd (1782–1857), Welsh military commander, and Himalayan mountaineer.
- James Trainer (1863–1915), football goalkeeper with 253 club caps and 20 with Wales.
- Leigh Richmond Roose (1877–1916), former Wales footballer with 370 club caps and 24 with Wales, born in Holt.
- J. G. Parry-Thomas (1884–1927), motor-racing driver, land speed record holder; died racing at Pendine Sands.
- Helen Johnson Houghton (1910–2012), a British racehorse trainer from Wrexham.
- Ray Williams (1927–2014), the world's first professional full-time rugby union coach.
- Stuart Williams (1930–2013), a Welsh footballer with 381 club caps and 43 with Wales, born in Wrexham.
- John Williams (born 1937), a Welsh retired snooker referee from Wrexham.
- Arfon Griffiths (born 1941), a former footballer and manager, 621 club caps and 17 for Wales.
- Dennis Taylor (born 1949), ex-snooker World Champion, currently lives in Llay.
- Joey Jones (1955–2025) former footballer with 594 club caps and 72 with Wales, lived in Wrexham
- Mark Hughes (born 1963), former Wales international footballer, later manager of Wales and other clubs.
- Robbie Savage (born 1974), former footballer with 538 club caps and 39 with Wales, born in Wrexham
- Andy Moore (born 1974), Neath/Swansea Rugby Club & Wales International, went to school in Wrexham
- Jason Koumas (born 1979), former Wales footballer with 422 club caps and 34 caps for Wales, born in Wrexham
- Jonathon O'Dougherty (born 1978), British National Ice Dance champion, born in Wrexham
- Chris Bartley (born 1984), rower, team silver medallist at the 2012 Summer Olympics
- Tom James (born 1984), Olympic Gold Medallist rower whose home town is nearby village of Coedpoeth.
- Laura Deas (born 1988), a skeleton ski racer, bronze medallist at the 2018 Winter Olympics.
- Xenna Hughes (born 1992), former Wales and Commonwealth Games hockey player.
- Dewi Penrhyn Jones (born 1994), professional cricketer for Glamorgan C.C.C. in 2014, born in Wrexham
- Tom Lawrence (born 1994), Welsh footballer with over 280 club caps and 23 caps for Wales, born in Wrexham.
- Seb Morris (born 1995), racing driver, in 2013 appeared as the face of Jack Wills, a British clothing brand; comes from Marford
- Harry Wilson (born 1997), Leeds and Wales international footballer with 44 caps for Wales
- Neco Williams (born 2001), Nottingham Forest and Wales international footballer with 55 caps for Wales
- Max Hudson (born 2007), goalkeeper

== Freedom of the City ==
The following people and military units have received the Freedom of the City of Wrexham.

=== Individuals ===
- Ryan Reynolds: 10 April 2023.
- Rob McElhenney: 10 April 2023.

=== Military Units ===
- Royal Welch Fusiliers: 5 June 1946.
- The Royal Welsh: 2008.
- 101 Force Support Battalion, Royal Electrical and Mechanical Engineers: 5 April 2013.
- The Welsh Guards: 18 July 2014.
