= Temple Row, Wrexham =

Street in Wrexham, Wales

Temple Row
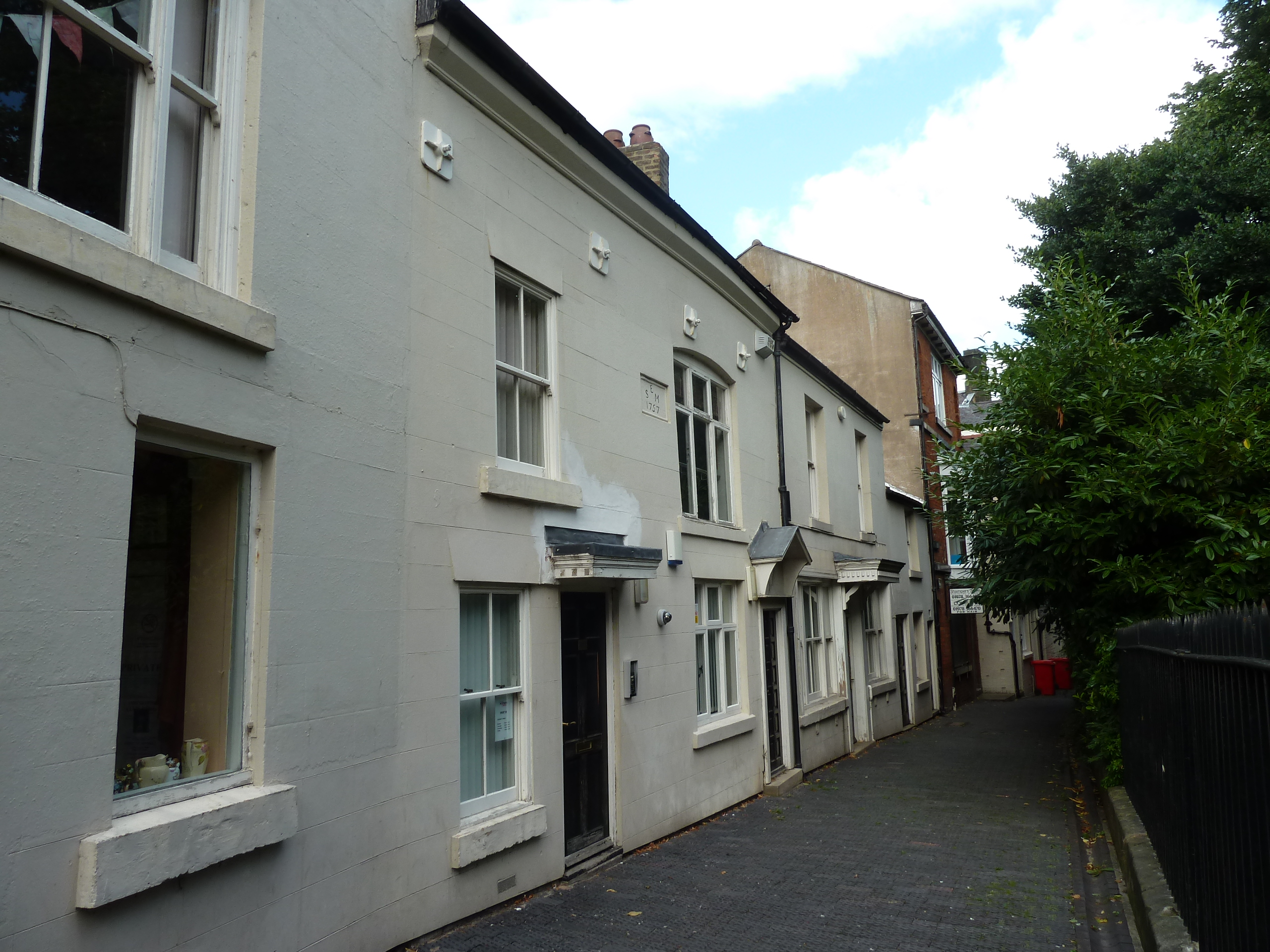
- Temple Row, east of the church gates, with No. 6 and No. 8 at the centre.
- Native name: Rhes y Deml (Welsh)
- Part of: Wrexham city centre
- Location: Wrexham, Wales
- Coordinates: 53.0447°N 2.9925°W

Temple Row (Welsh: Rhes y Deml) is an historic street in Wrexham city centre, North Wales. It goes along the border of the churchyard of St Giles' Church. The street contains the listed No. 6 and part of the listed churchgates of St Giles. On St Giles' eastern side, it is parallel with Yorke Street where it was bounded by residences which were demolished in 1967.

== Description ==
The Overton Arcade connects to the street, as does College Street. It was previously known as Temple-place. Temple Row is considered part of Wrexham's historic medieval core due to it being adjacent to St Giles' Church. It is not exactly known why the street got its name, due to a lack of a Masonic lodge. The name may have been connected to Wrexham's historical small Jewish community.

Temple Row also extends to the eastern boundary of the churchyard of St Giles, where it is parallel to Yorke Street. Here below the churchyard, was once a row of large tenement blocks on a grassy bank, that served as a residential area at the rear of Yorke Street. These residences backed onto the borders of the churchyard and Yorke Street, with it said churchwardens complained in the 19th century that residents hanged their clothes on the churchyard railings to dry. These properties which backed onto Yorke Street, as well as the Temple Row street itself, were demolished in 1967 to allow for an increase in traffic flow on Yorke Street, which was an A road through central Wrexham at the time.

The building on the corner of Temple Row and Church Street was proposed to be demolished in the 1970s. It averted demolition and was instead renovated.

It is claimed the street's terraced houses have alleged entrances in their cellars to underground walkways which are said to lead to St Giles' Church.

== Listed buildings ==
=== No. 6 ===
No. 6 is a Grade II listed building on Temple Row. It was previously listed as No. 8. It is part of an irregular terrace which borders the churchyard of St Giles' Church, and encloses the plots located to the rear of buildings located along High Street. It was built as a house but now is used as a shop. The building originally formed part of 3–4 Church Street, and is still connected to that building on its first floor. When it was part of 3–4 Church Street it was (re-)built by Samuel Edwards in 1757. Its exterior is lined out render, possibly over brickwork, and it has a slate roof. It is two storeys tall, and has an inserted shop front on its left. Internally its interior plan was modified from its original design.

=== Churchyard gates ===
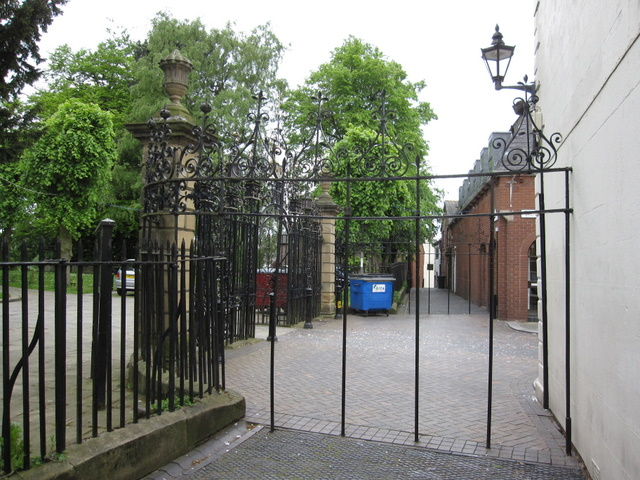
St Giles' Church Gates, from the eastern side gates on Temple Row, across Church Street and the main gates to the western side gates on the rest of Temple Row.

The main entrance to the churchyard of St Giles' Church is bounded by wrought iron gates. Erected in 1720, the churchyard gates were made by the Davies brothers of Bersham, with the gates also restored in c. 1820 and 1900. Sometime after 1821, the gates were slightly moved from their original location. The gates are principally aligned with the north-west door of the church and with Church Street. While the iron gates are bounded by side arches over Temple Row and towards College Street. The gates are double gates and centrally arches, while the side gates are also arched and of a lower height. There are wrought iron gate piers either side of the main and side gates, they have hollow square sections, highly enriched, with leaf and flower-detailed overthrow.
