= Town Hill, Wrexham =

Street in Wrexham, Wales

Town Hill
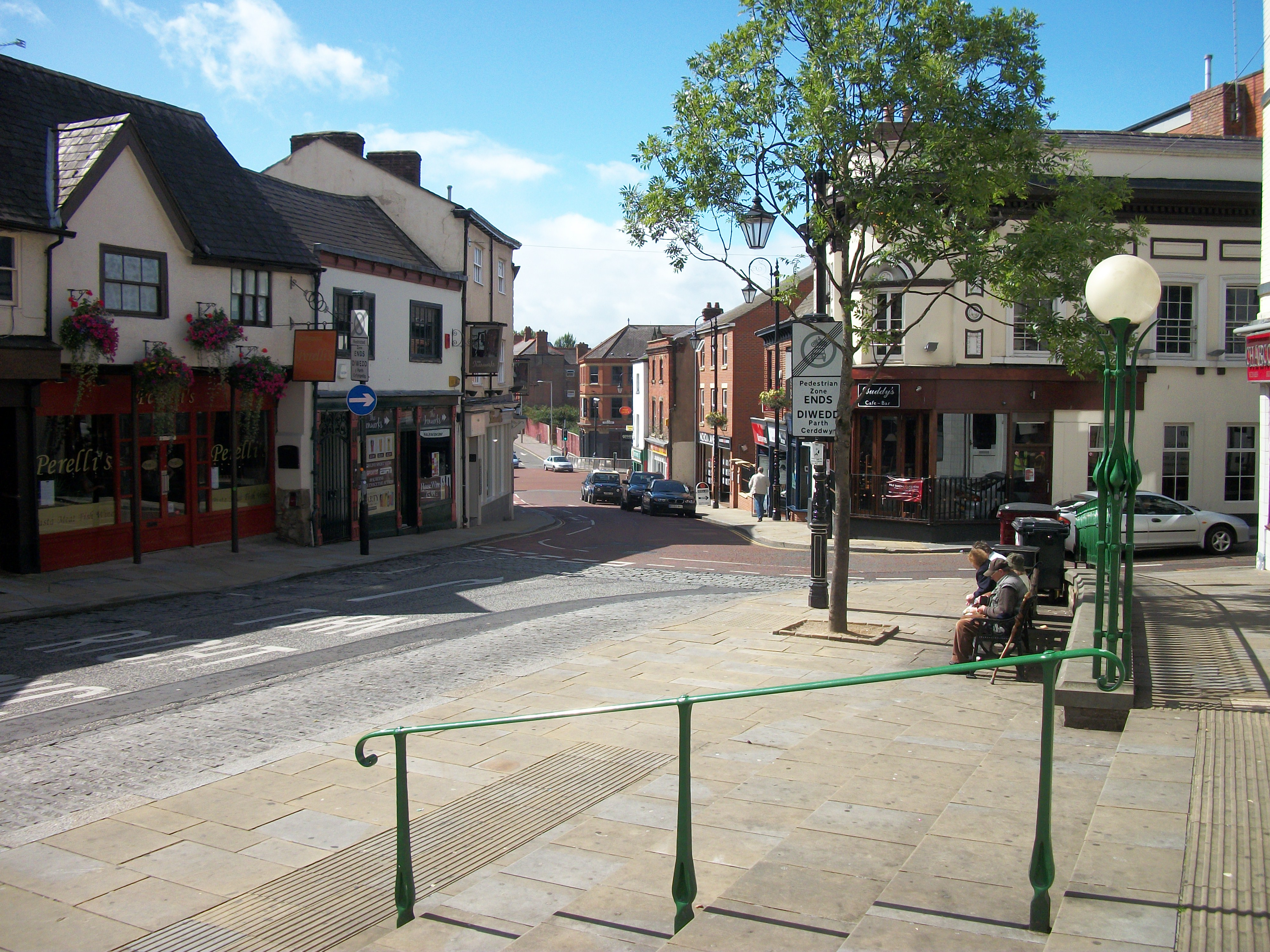
- Town Hill, looking on the site of the former town hall, with Abbot Street to the right, and looking down towards Bridge Street.
- Interactive map of Town Hill
- Native name: Allt y Dref (Welsh)
- Part of: Wrexham city centre
- Location: Wrexham, Wales
- Coordinates: 53.0447°N 2.9941°W

Town Hill (Welsh: Allt y Dref) is a street in Wrexham city centre, North Wales. It contains the listed buildings of Nos. 5, 7, and 9. The street is located on higher ground, just to the north of St Giles' Church. It forms a cross-roads junction at the centre of Wrexham with Church Street, High Street and Hope Street. It is now at the centre of Wrexham's nightlife district.

The street was in medieval times possibly home to burgess plots, with houses and shops. In the 17th century it was referred to as Bridge Street (which now refers to an adjacent street), then later sometimes classed as part of neighbouring High Street. The earliest mention of the name Town Hill is to 1801.

Town Hill was also the site of Wrexham's old town hall (or shire hall), dating from a 16th-century building, which was then re-built in the 18th century. The old town hall and buildings along its adjacent Back Chamber Street, were demolished in 1940 as part of a widening of Town Hill to alleviate traffic congestion, likely due to nearby High Street serving as the town's then bus terminal. The site where the town hall stood is now a widened section of Town Hill between the cross-roads junction and the junction with Abbot Street.

== Listed buildings ==
=== No. 5 ===
No. 5 is a Grade II listed building located on the south side of Town Hill, adjacent to the Church Street junction. The building forms a single build with No. 7, with which the two may have originally formed a single larger property. No. 5 was built as a house, likely in the early 16th-century, with the building divided into No. 5 and No. 7 in c. 1800, while a rear range was added or rebuilt in c. 1900.

Its exterior is render over a timber frame, while its rear wing is made of brick, and both have slate roofs. There is square panel framing on the upper gable wall, which was exposed when the adjacent property was demolished. The building is two-storeys tall, with a two-window range. Its shop front was inserted in 1927 and was made by Pollard of London. There are some traces of the building's original timber-framed structure visible from its first floor. The building underwent restoration in the 1970s, exposing its timber-framing and wattle and daub infill. The building serves as the One to Five restaurant and pub.

=== No. 7 ===
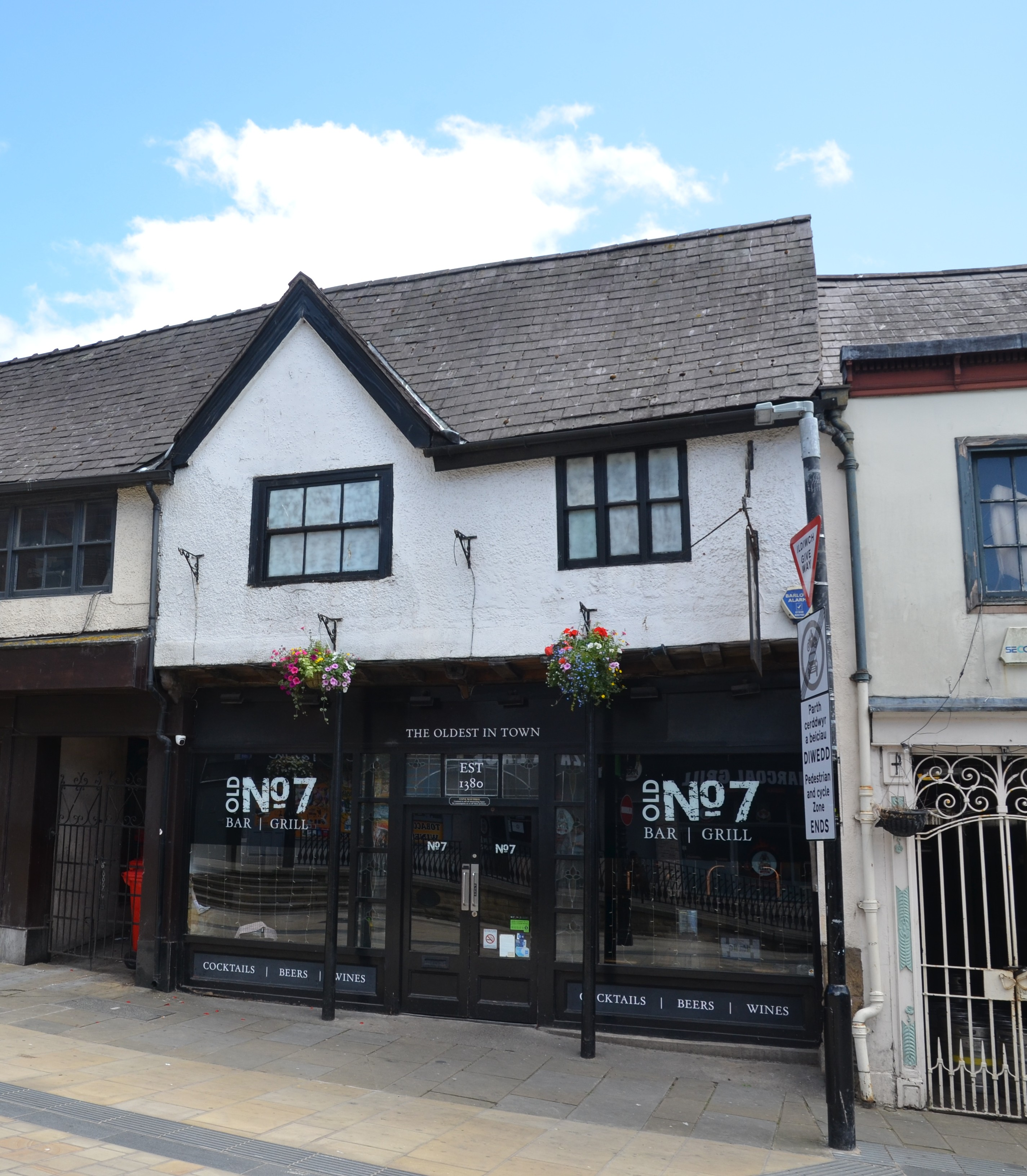
No. 7 on Town Hill

No. 7 is a Grade II* listed building located on the south side of Town Hill. It is part of a continuous set of buildings, with the burgages stretching towards College Street at their rear. The building was likely built as a house, but was later converted for commercial use. It is of the late medieval era, with its rear wing forming the oldest part, as it was a cruck-framed open hall. The building originally also included No. 5, but the two were subdivided in c. 1800. A cross-wing forms its street front, which was likely added (or as part of a remodelling) in the early 16th century, and now contains a 20th-century shop front. Its exterior is timber-framed, and it has a slate roof. In the 1990s, the building underwent a restoration which revealed that some of its internal panelling was marked with the date 1681, and remains of a possible priest hole. It is one of only two Grade II* buildings in the city centre.

=== Dodman's ===
Dodman's (No. 9) is a Grade II listed building located on the south side of Town Hill. It is part of a continuous set of buildings, with the plot stretching towards College Street at their rear. The building was likely built as a house but was later converted for commercial use, with workshops in its rear wing. It is likely from the late 16th or early 17th centuries and is two-storeys. It was refronted in the early 19th century, while its shop front was inserted in the late 19th century and since been renewed, and has a central doorway. Its exterior is a render over brick, while its rear is timber-framed and has slate roofs. In the 1990s, it underwent renovation, exposing much of the original timber work of the building. It notably housed the Dodman's shoe shop.

== History ==
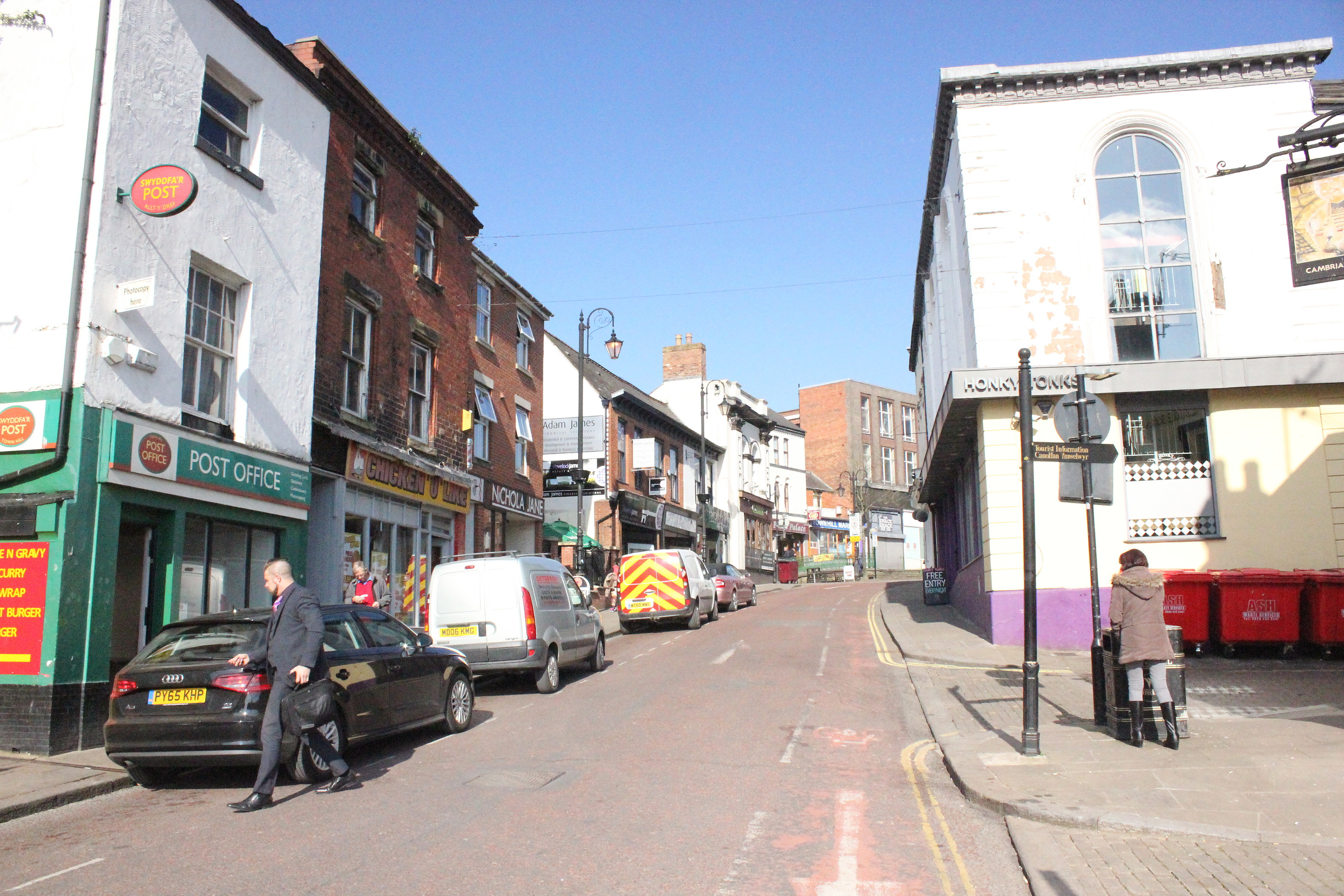
Town Hill from the bottom of the street, with College Street to the right.

The street is located on higher ground, just to the north of St Giles' Church. It forms part of a crossroads at the centre of Wrexham, between Church Street, High Street and Hope Street. The street widens from its junction with Abbot Street to the crossroads junction. This was the site of the old town hall, built in 1713 and demolished in 1940. Many of the buildings lining the street are listed buildings.

Long, narrow, possibly medieval, burgess plots had been identified on the street, highlighting the street's medieval connections, forming part of Wrexham's medieval core. The plots were characterised to be dense and compact, upon which stood an intermingling of houses and shops. It was common for properties to consist of a shopfront, while the upper floors of a building served as accommodation for the shopkeeper. While a building's rear housed a workshop and yard. Some of these yards have survived along Town Hill and High Street, although most were filled and built upon.

The street was called "Bridge Street" in 1670–71; the name did not last, and "Bridge Street" now refers to the adjacent street towards Pen y Bryn and the former Horns Bridge. It was also vaguely described as "the street leading towards Oswestry".

In the 18th century, Town Hill was sometimes classed as part of High Street. However, the first mentions of the name "Town Hill" can be traced to 1801; the name was likely coined earlier, but was not an "old name".

The Town Hall was demolished in early 1940 to help alleviate traffic issues and congestion, particularly with High Street, which served as a bus terminal at the time.

=== Recent history ===
The street is now located in Wrexham's nightlife hotspot. In 2005, the council installed portable urinals to address public urination.

Now located at the bottom of Town Hill is a welfare centre, formerly a toilet block, called Hafan y Dref. Opened in December 2015, it provides assistance to individuals attending local nightlife venues in the area.

In February 2020, the Daily Post reported that it was the tenth highest street in North Wales for attacks and assaults, likely due to it being part of Wrexham's hub of bars, clubs and pubs. In 2024, the street was pedestrianised, alongside three other city centre streets.

== Town Hall (1713–1940) ==
Town Hall
- Neuadd y Dref (Welsh)
- Interactive map of the Town Hall area
- Former names: Shire Hall
- Alternative names: Old Wrexham Town Hall

General information
- Status: Demolished
- Type: Courthouse; Municipal building; Shire hall; Warehouse; Market
- Location: Town Hill, Wrexham, Wales
- Coordinates: 53.0450°N 2.9934°W
- Completed: 16th century (by 1562); 1713 (new building)
- Demolished: February–March 1940

The Town Hall (Welsh: Neuadd y Dref), historically the Shire Hall, was a municipal building in Wrexham, Wales. It was located on Town Hill in the city centre.

A building on the site can be traced to the 16th century, with the then Shire hall building serving as a courthouse. In 1713, the building was rebuilt, while it stopped providing court functions later in the 18th century, increasingly being utilised by tenants and for public events. Part of the building shortly served as a militia depot, while by 1820 it began being described as a Town Hall. Prior to demolition, the building was a warehouse, market and billiard hall.

It was demolished in 1940 as part of the widening of Town Hill to alleviate traffic congestion in the area, especially as neighbouring High Street served as a bus terminal.

A small alley was located next to it called Back Chamber Street (see § Other buildings) until demolition.

=== Building history ===
==== Shirehall ====
The Shire Hall had stood on the same site since the reign of Henry VIII (16th century). It was used as a Magistrates' court and a meeting place, while a 1705 statement records the Shirehall was built on lands belonging to the Crown. Although one of the earliest mentions of the site was in 1562, when it was called "The Common Hall" and "Hall of Pleas".

This medieval building had nine shops and an open space located beneath it. Located on top was the hall, the Grand Chamber, which was reserved for the Crown, and this was used for hosting the Great sessions and Quarter sessions. It was also used by the courts of the manor of Wrexham Regis (superseding the older courthouse of the manor located at The Parkey) and possibly the neighbouring manor of the Lordship of Bromfield and Yale. It is also possible that some of the hall (and the nearby "Hand Inn") was built on church land. This was mentioned in a 1663 quarter session held at the hall, stating "some of this said courthouse or building [stands] on the church land". This church's land ownership was likely due to the fact that when the site was extended westward, it extended onto land that required a payment to the churchwardens.

In 1583, Richard Gwyn, a Catholic priest (now a martyr), was held in the black chamber of the previous hall until his execution. It is also claimed that Charles I made a speech at the hall addressed to Wrexham's population.

By 1658, the medieval building was possibly in a "ruinous condition" as the grand jury then raised calls for a "proper Shirehall" for the town of Wrexham. In 1659, a levy was raised throughout the county to raise funds for such a hall. A new site, separate from the current site, was selected for the construction of a new building. However, no new such building was constructed at the time, with the levy funds instead going to fund the repair of the existing town hall and towards the construction of the Shirehall in Ruthin.

==== Rebuilding and as a Town Hall ====
In 1713, a new building as a Town Hall was built, replacing the previous old medieval hall, on the same site to the expense of the county. The new hall had two floors, an upper and lower floor, with the lower floor being open and containing nine shops, while the upper floor was used by magistrates. The Hall stood on open arches, that were resting on pillars located where the past shops had been. The building had extended westwards on its northern side, likely to add a jury room. While an additional two-storey building was constructed to its south-west, containing a few rooms for occupation by the then county treasurer Philip Cross.

From the 18th century, the hall was occasionally let by the Crown for public entertainment and meetings when it was not required for county use. Although in return, lessees had to bear the cost of building repairs, with the county not providing funds. As a result of these public lets, the premises hosted a "Yorkshire Cloth Market" as part of a March fair. However, by 1788, following suggestions, the county would re-acquire the hall, cloth traders had to re-locate to a small square of shops on a tanner's property, later coined as Yorkshire Square. The plans of the county to re-acquire the hall, however, did not follow through, as instead the great sessions or assizes were moved to Ruthin as a new Hall of Pleas and a record office was decided to be built there.

In the early 19th century, the great room of the hall had been additionally used for a while as a depot for the East Denbighshire Militia, with their muskets and uniforms being ranged around the building's walls.

In 1820, it was then described as "A Town Hall or Hall of Pleas". In c. 1834, the ground floor was enclosed between its pillars, with the lower part of the premises converted into "spirit vaults" shortly after. In April 1852, a clock was presented to the town by local subscriptions to commemorate the marriage of Watkin Williams-Wynn, and was placed on the eastern front elevation of the building. Beneath the clock was the coat of arms of Charles II, which bore the date 1663. In 1879, the police and Magistrates in the building moved to County Buildings.

==== Demolition ====
Prior to its demolition, the building had a "flourish[ing]" bonded warehouse, which raised concerns just weeks before the building's demolition. The first floor of the building was a "fine chamber", which hosted many courts over the years, but in its final years was home to the Wrexham Billiard Hall. The lower floor was an open-sided market, a custom of many halls of the period, still having the nine shops.

There was a licensed premises Town Hall Vaults, that was located on Back Chamber Street. The licensed premises closed just before the Town Hall was demolished.

It was demolished between February and March 1940, to help alleviate traffic issues and congestion, particularly with High Street, as at the time, it served as Wrexham's bus terminal to Chester, Llangollen and nearby villages. The commemorative clock was relocated to Lord Street, overlooking the (new) Wrexham bus station. Edward Hubbard, in his Clwyd volume in the Buildings of Wales series, wrote of the "grievous" damage done to Wrexham's architectural heritage by 19th and 20th century developments - he considered the destruction of the Town Hall, "the demolition most to be deplored".

== Other buildings ==
Located to the northern side of the Town Hall, was a small street called Back Chamber Street. Originally called Black Chamber Street, likely connected to a 16th-century lord's prison called Y Siambr Ddu (Welsh for 'The Black Chamber'), which was possibly part of the Shirehall/Town Hall. The use of "Back" over "Black" is merely a newer name for the same lane. It was a raised pathway connecting Abbot Street with Hope Street, specifically between the north side of the old Hand Inn and the Town Hall. Following the town hall's demolition in 1940, it became part of Town Hill.

Also located on the former town hall site, at its western Abbot Street end, was The Hand Inn. There had been a building on this site since the 17th century, and, like the town hall, was likely built on lands belonging to the Crown. Carved beams had been found at the site, bearing symbols of both the Crown and the Church, suggesting the likely ownership of the land upon which the building lay. One of the royal symbols carved in was the badge of Henry VII, likely from an earlier building as part of a c. 1715 re-building. Following the re-building it was renamed "The Black Lion" and known as such until at least 1771. By 1788, it was known as "The Bull's Head", but by 1801, it was known as "The Hand". It was demolished in 1939 as part of road improvements.

One of Wrexham's early commercial breweries, possibly the earliest, was the Albion Brewery and it was located at the bottom of Town Hill at its junction with Bridge Street. Near the bottom also lies College Street, with the Cambrian Vaults Public House (The Parish) on the junction.
