= Overton Arcade =

Shopping arcade in Wrexham, Wales

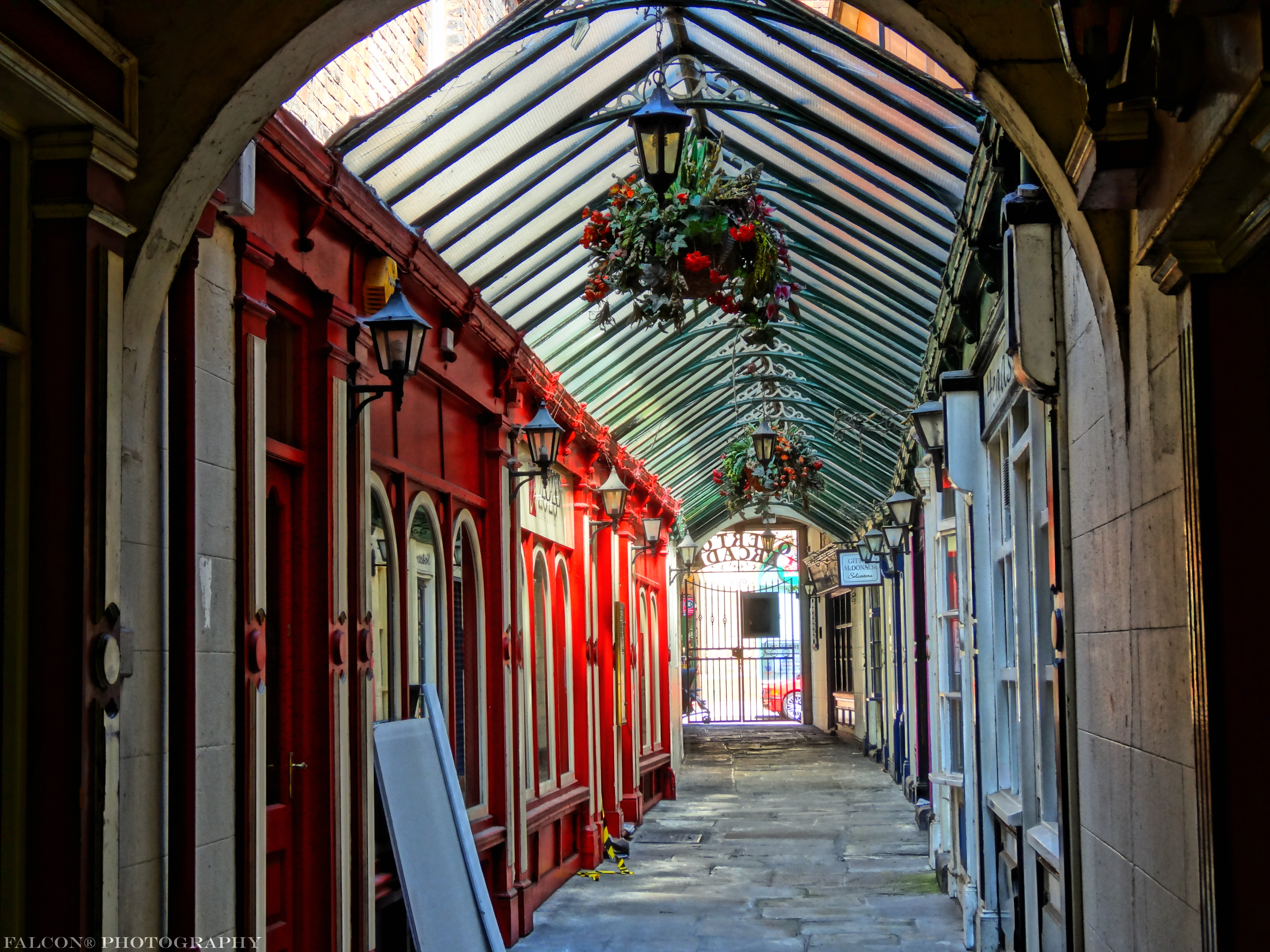
- The arcade on a non-trading day
- Location: Wrexham, Wales
- Coordinates: 53.044902°N 2.992267°W
- Opened: 1869
- Owner: Mr Moir (as of January 2020)
- Architect: Mr Heywood

The Overton Arcade is a shopping arcade in Wrexham city centre, Wales. Built in 1868 and opening in 1869, the arcade connects Wrexham's High Street to Temple Row which passes along the churchyards of St Giles' Church. It is named after its proprietor William Overton and not the nearby village of Overton (also known as Overton-on-Dee).

== Description and history ==
The arcade was built in 1868, and opened in 1869, It is named after the proprietor William Overton, who had served as mayor of Wrexham. It connects Wrexham's High Street to the churchyard of St Giles' Church.

The arcade's side facing the High Street is made of brick from the Ponkey Brick and Tile Company, and with stone dressings from the Dennis's Cefn quarries. The overall design of the arcade was described, when it opened in 1869, as "plain, with very little attempt at ornamentation", with the exception of flowers and fruits carved into the keystones present over the arcade's windows. The building rises 40 ft (12 m), with the roof being a "neat" cornice with capped chimneys. The front shop to the arcade in 1869 was 25 ft (7.6 m) by 22 ft (6.7 m), with the showroom being 30 ft (9.1 m) by 25 ft (7.6 m). The roof of the arcade in 1869 was made of blue-painted iron, filled with rough plate glass. The shop fronts were also painted in two tints of blue at the time. There are wrought iron gates at both ends of the arcade, with the end facing the churchyard (to Temple Row, initially Temple-place) having two offices. The arcade's architect was Mr Heywood living on Queen Street in Wrexham at the time.

The arcade's passage is built into 31 High Street. A building had been present on the site since 1750, but the modern building and the arcade were built in 1868.

The arcade's name has led to beliefs that it was named after the nearby village of Overton, but it was named after the arcade's proprietor William Overton.

From the mid-1880s, the arcade became filled with more offices, with various auctioneers and estate agents opening in the arcade during this period.

The arcade faced potential long-term closure in 2014 following a decrease in the units in use, but re-opened in September of that year. In 2019, plans were submitted to construct flats above the arcade.

By 2020, the arcade had become a "hotspot" for independent shops in Wrexham.
