= College Street =

College Street may refer to:

- College Street (Kolkata)
- College Street (Toronto)
- College Street, Sydney
- College Street (York)
- College Street, Dublin, a road in Dublin City Centre
- College Street, Wrexham
