= College Street, Wrexham =

Street in Wrexham, Wales

College Street
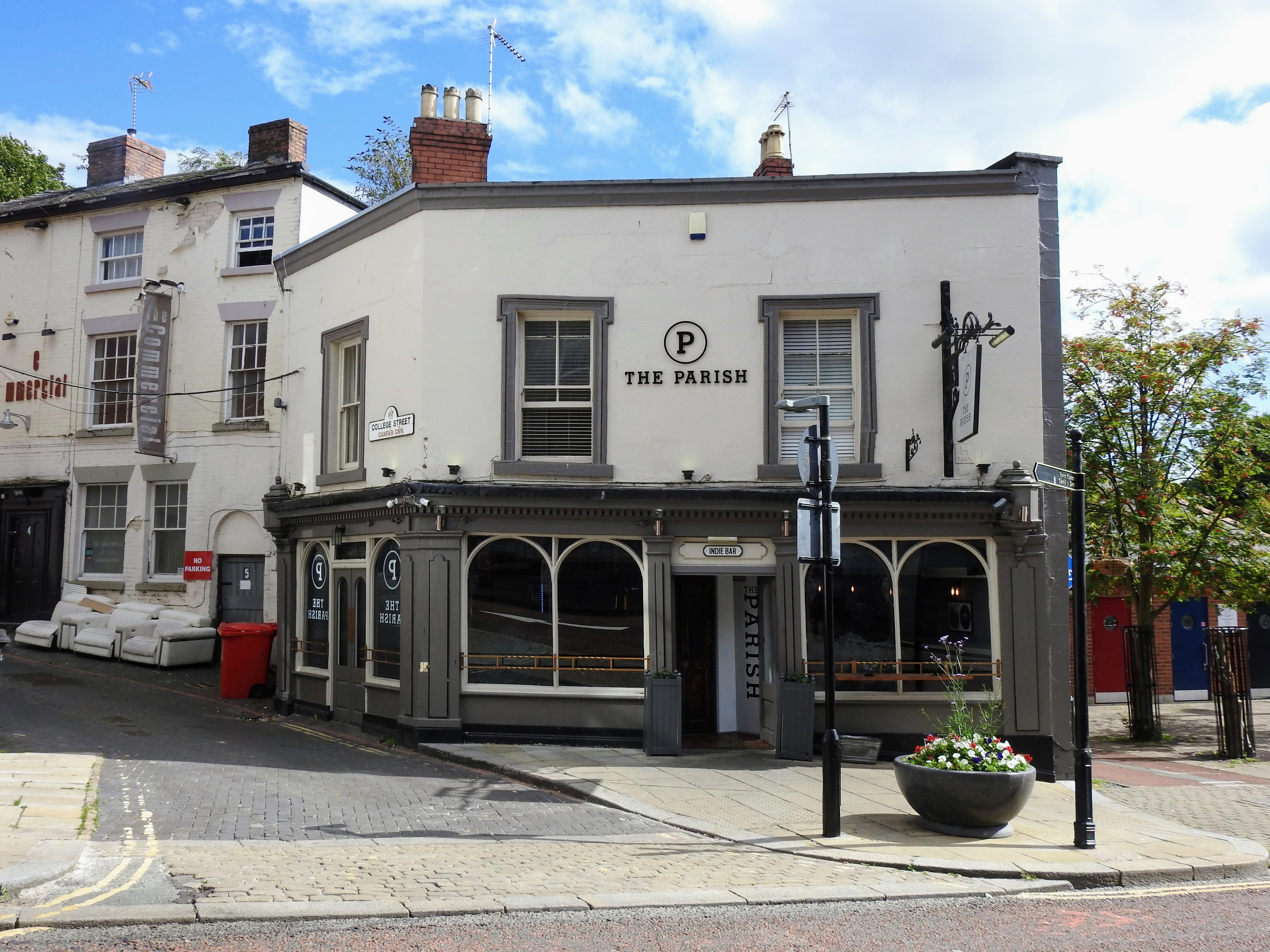
- The Cambrian Vaults (now The Parish) on the street near to the junction with Town Hill, with the Commercial to the left.
- Interactive map of College Street
- Native name: Camfa'r Cŵn (Welsh)
- Part of: Wrexham city centre
- Namesake: College House (claimed)
- Location: Wrexham, Wales
- Coordinates: 53.0445°N 2.9940°W

College Street (Welsh: Camfa'r Cŵn) is a street in Wrexham city centre, North Wales. It contains the Grade II listed Cambrian Vaults and The Commercial Public House, as well as the historic home of Wrexham's first brewery.

It was possibly named after "College House" located adjacent and near St Giles' Church and Temple Row. Its Welsh name means "the Dog's stile," referring to a historic stile that was located next to the churchyard that aimed to keep dogs out of the church and its surroundings.

== Listed buildings ==
There are two Grade II listed buildings on College Street, the Cambrian Vaults and the Commercial Public House. Both serve as remnants of Wrexham's brewing industry which was centred on this area adjacent to the River Gwenfro. The Wrexham and Ellesmere Railway ran adjacent to the street.

=== Cambrian Vaults ===
The Cambrian Vaults is a pub building located on College Street, on its junction with Town Hill. The building dates from c. 1830, while the pub itself dates to c. 1780, when it was known as the Miners' Arms, a name it held until 1857, until it adopted its current name. The 19th century buildings exterior is made of render over brick, and has a slate roof. It is two storeys, with two-window ranges facing both Town Hill and College Street. Its ground floor has a late 19th century style (possibly also renewed) public frontage. It is a Grade II listed building. The building now houses The Parish bar.

=== The Commercial Public House ===
The Commercial Public House (No. 11) is a public house located on the lower side of College Street, near the street's junction with Town Hill.

The building dates to c. 1820, and was probably purpose-built to be a public house. The building was first recorded as "The Commercial Hotel" in 1841, and replaced an earlier (likely pub) building on the same site, which had been continually occupied by the late 17th century. That previous pub was known as the "Blue Posts", with a pub of that name recorded at the site from the 1690s up until the current pub's construction in the early 19th century. Although it is also described as the "Blue Bell Inn". It later combined with the "Ship Inn" located next door.

It has been theorised that an inn was located on the site in the 15th century, housing St Giles' Church stonemasons, however it cannot be verified. It is also claimed that the first Wesleyan Methodist sermon (maybe actually first in the town) was preached in one of the street's premises, or in a yard of the street, in 1773 by Samuel Bradburn.

In the 1990s, the pub became an Irish pub known as "Scruffy Murphys" during the craze of Irish-themed establishments of the time. It returned to "The Commercial" afterwards.

The 19th century building's exterior is of painted brick, and it has a slate roof. It is three storeys tall, while its entrance is located to the left of the building's centre.

== Description and other buildings ==
College Street is considered part of Wrexham's historic medieval core due to it being adjacent to St Giles' Church. College Street is connected to Temple Row.

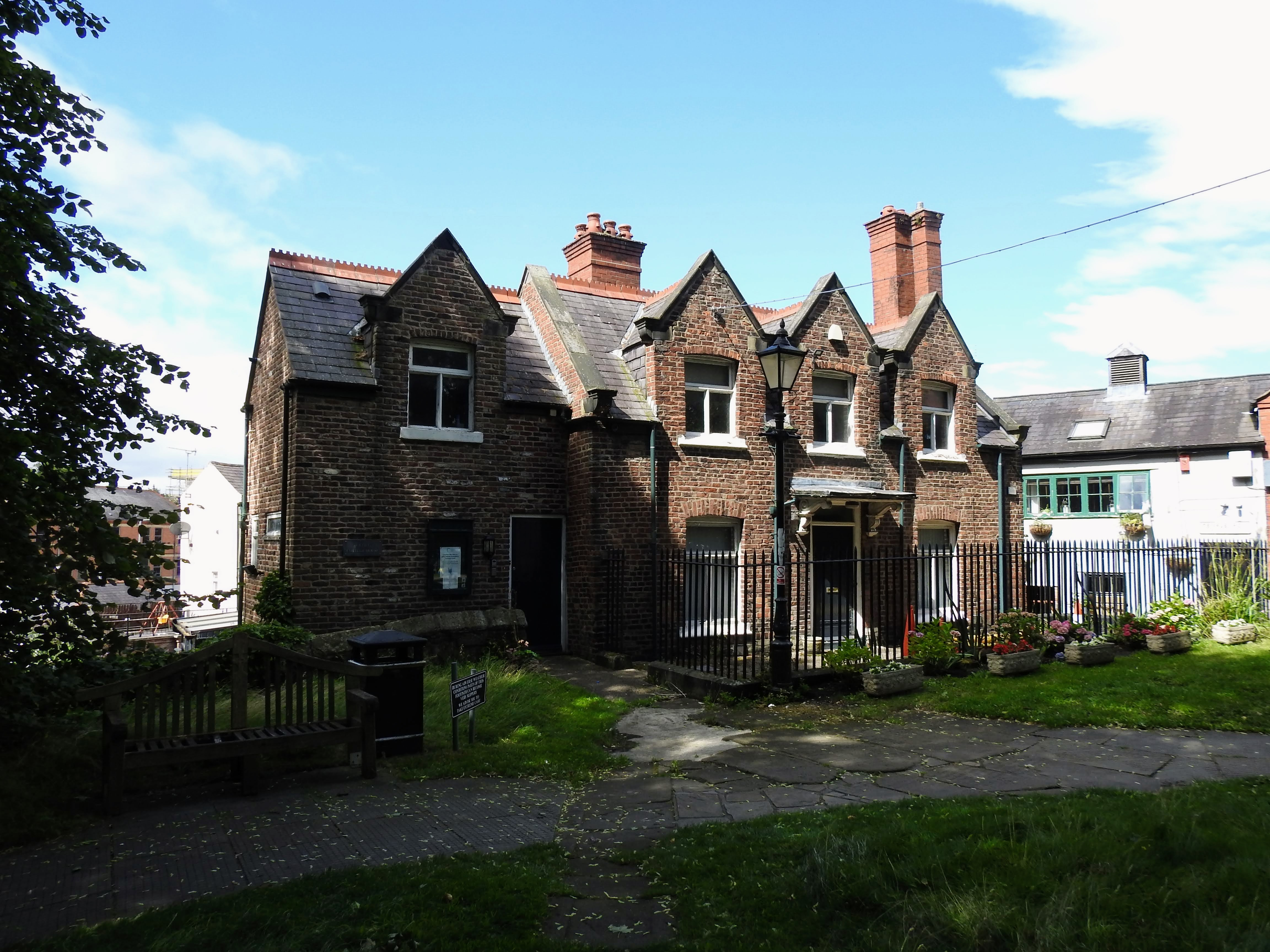
College House from St Giles' Churchyard. College Street borders it by its rear (far right), and the street is said to be named after the house.

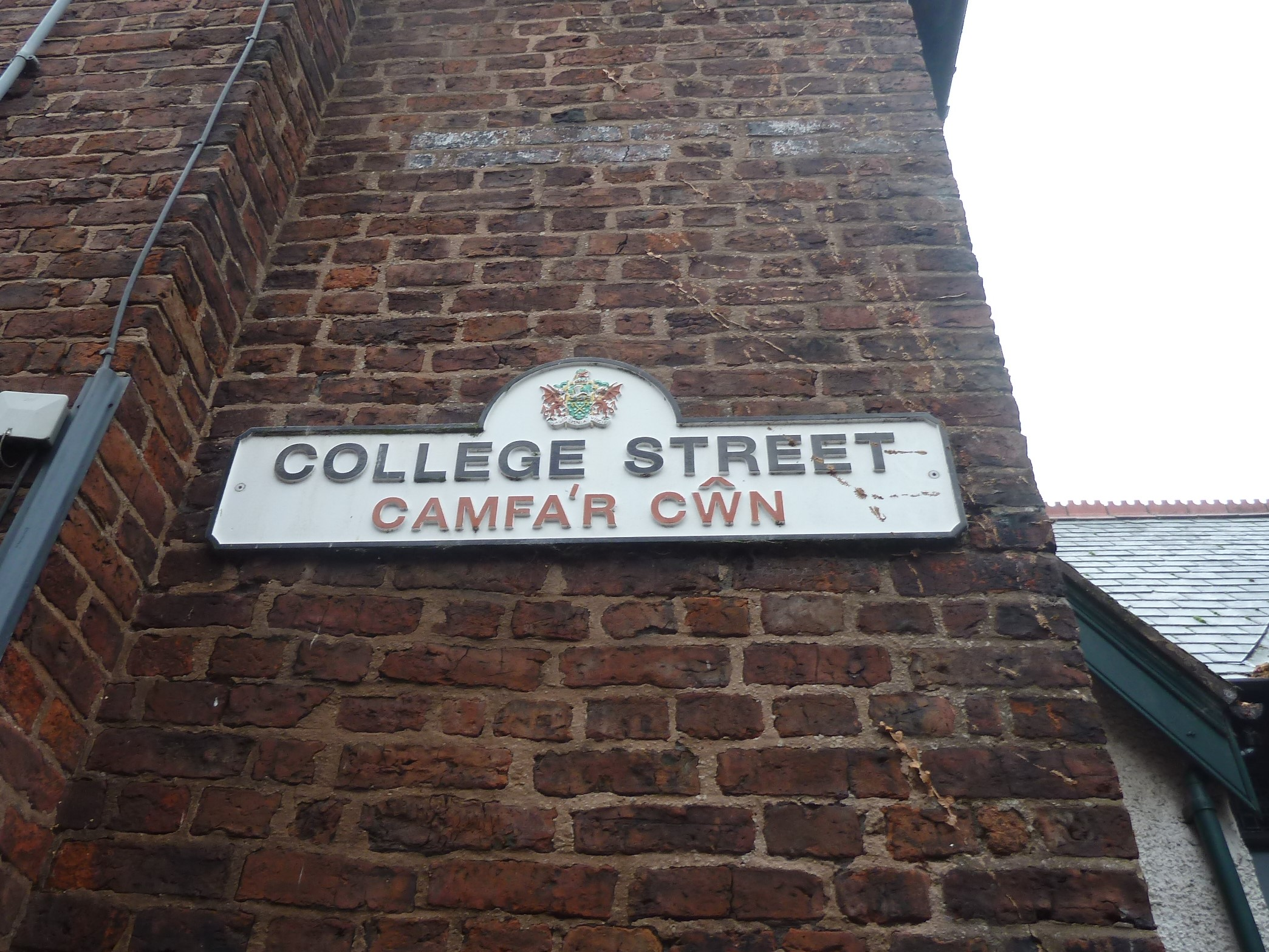
Bilingual street sign

It was possibly named after "College House". Its Welsh name Camfa'r Cwn, means the Dog's stile, named after the stile that was located next to the churchyard aiming to keep dogs out of the church and its surroundings. It was also referred to as Cefn y Cwm, considered a "distortion" of the usual Welsh name.

Wrexham's first commercial brewery, the Thomas' Brewery opened on College Street in the late 18th century. While the street also housed a bordello and a pawn shop.

While its exact location has not been identified, there was a bridge known as "Horns Bridge" in the area named after a nearby hostel called "The Horns". The bridge was also previously called Pont y llianeu/Pont-y-Llianeu, which suggests a historical presence of nuns or some type of religious women, although not certain whether there was any in Wrexham. There was a kiln located at the steps on the street.

No. 1–3 are a set of three interconnected terraced buildings dating to the early 19th century. Following a survey, it is theorised these buildings underwent four phases of construction, and that they were constructed as a mix of shops and dwellings. The buildings are in an early Victorian style, with its existing exterior retaining a high level of the original exterior.

No. 5–9 on the street are red brick dwellings of the late 18th century.

No. 8 was the home of James Williams, a military master tailor, who created the Wrexham Tailor's Quilt (also known as the Tailor's Coverlet), described by Museum Wales as one of Wales' "most well-known patchworks". Williams created the piece between 1842 and 1852, with it being displayed at the 1876 Wrexham Art Treasures Exhibition, 1925 British Empire Exhibition, and the 1933 Wrexham National Eisteddfod. It was made of 4,525 material pieces that were hand-sewn, likely many from military uniforms. It was sold to the national museum in the 1930s.

On the opposite corner from the Cambrian Vaults (now The Parish) was Wrexham's former post office until 1885, when it moved to Egerton Street.

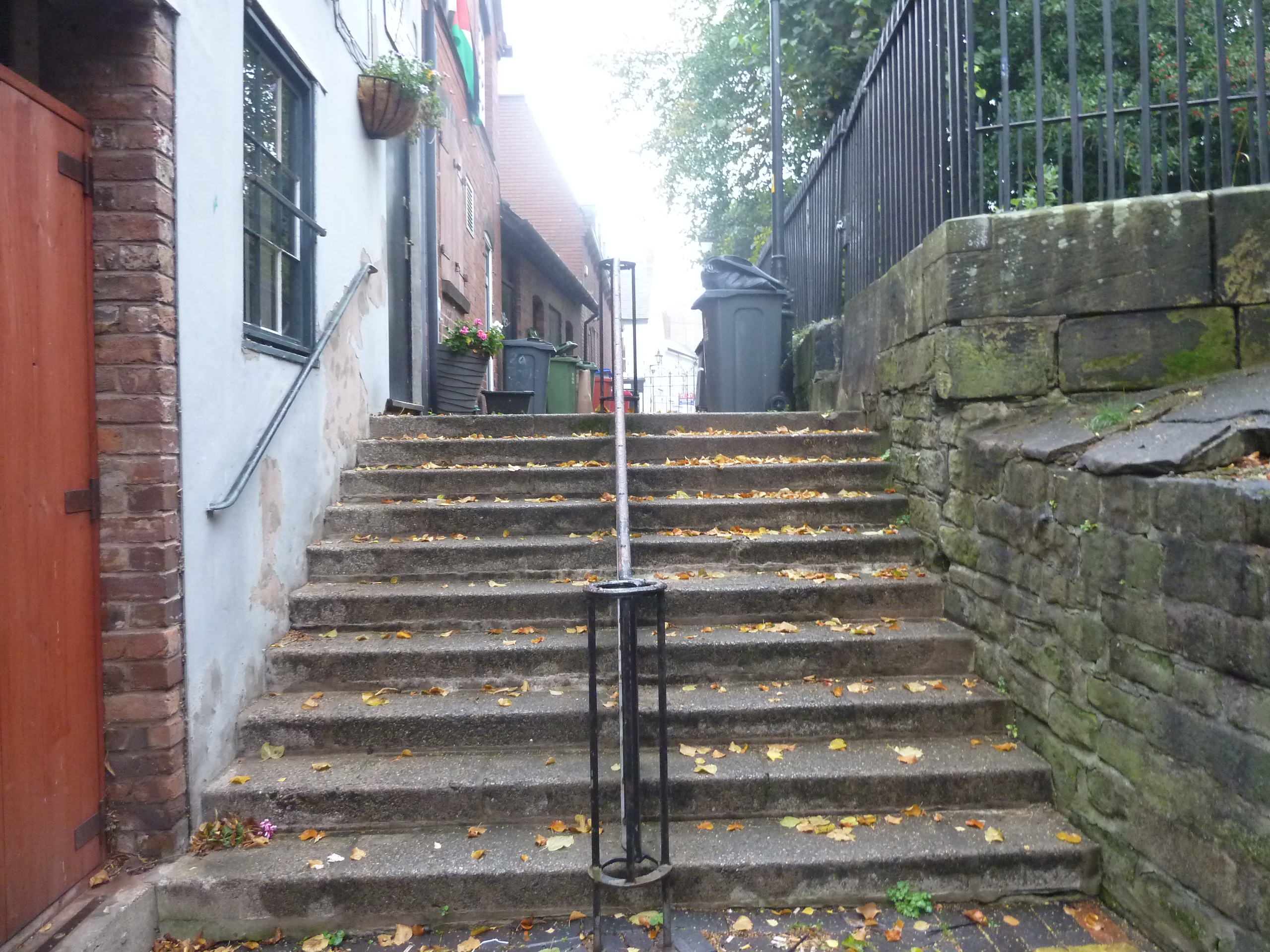
Steps from College Street up towards Temple Row
