= Church Street, Wrexham =

Street in Wrexham, Wales

Church Street
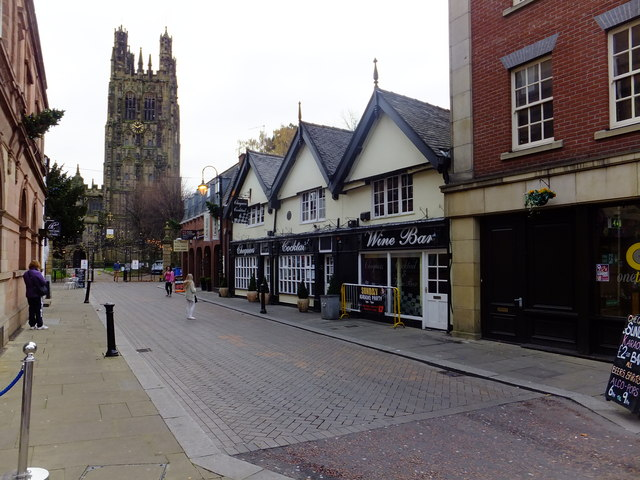
- Church Street towards St Giles' Church, with Nos. 7–10 in the centre.
- Interactive map of Church Street
- Native name: Stryt yr Eglwys (Welsh)
- Part of: Wrexham city centre
- Namesake: St Giles' Church
- Location: Wrexham, Wales
- Coordinates: 53.0448°N 2.99312°W

Church Street (Welsh: Stryt yr Eglwys) is a street in Wrexham city centre, North Wales. The street leads to St Giles' Church, and contains the Grade II listed Nos. 3–4 and the Grade II* listed Nos. 7–10, as well as the church gates of St Giles'. These gates form the entrance to the church's grounds, as well as a junction with Temple Row.

== Listed buildings ==
=== No. 3–4 ===
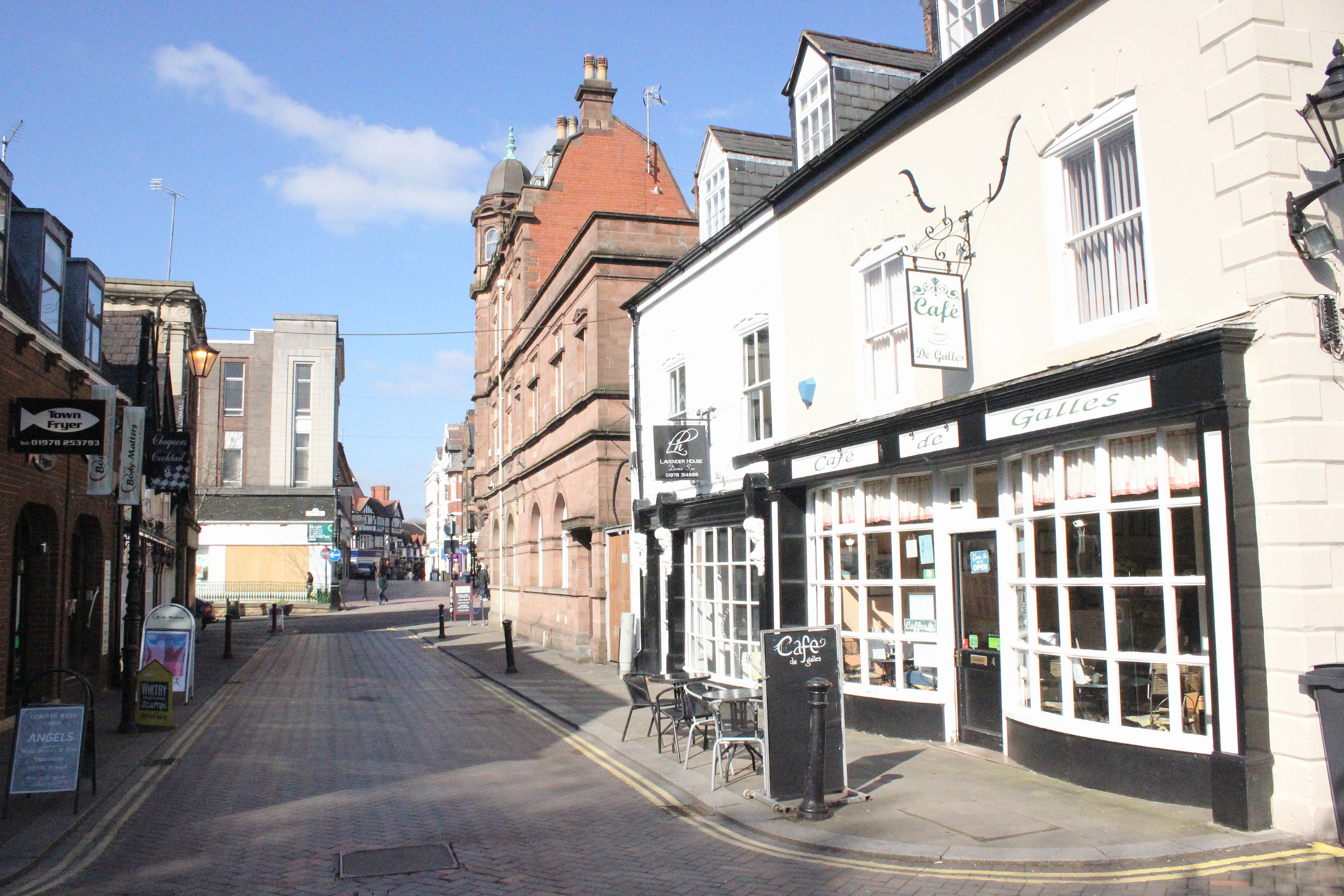
The other side of the street, from the church with Nos. 3–4 to the right.

No. 3 and No. 4 is a Grade II listed building located on the corner of Church Street's junction with Temple Row. It is a largely mid-18th-century structure but with a 17th-century core. It was rebuilt in 1757 to become two houses and shops, and was done by Samuel Edwards. At this time it would have also included 6 Temple Row. Its exterior is a render (stucco) over brickwork, with incorporated elements of a timber-framed structure. It is two storeys tall, has an attic, and a slate roof. The building retains its early 19th-century shopfront with its doorway located to the left. A later 20th-century shopfront is present towards No. 4. The building is connected on its first floor with 6 Temple Row, which was historically linked with No. 3. No. 3 has a 19th-century shop window.

=== No. 7–10 ===
No. 7, No. 8, No. 9 and No. 10 are three Grade II* buildings on the western side of Church Street, situated prominently on the approach to St Giles' Church. It is theorised they were built in the early 16th century, and likely as a three-unit medieval hall-house. It was remodelled in the late 17th century, during which an upper storey was added to the building, as well as other minor alterations. The building is presently used as a wine bar and a shop. It is timber-framed, with its original structure being cruck-framed, with some box-framed modifications.

Its exterior is stucco over external timber framing, and it has a slate roof. It is a two-storeyed hall, arranged in a cross-wing plan. It has 20th-century shopfronts. The original structure of the building is likely to have been a full-length open hall but was later remodelled with its cross wings. It originally would have had only one floor as a hall house, with the ceiling extending to the roof. There is a panel dating to 1681 bearing the initials T. over I. A. located on the north gable wall, and may refer to the insertion of the upper floor and the construction of the building's cross gables.

Nos. 7–10 may be the oldest building in Wrexham, possibly even predating the church by 100 to 150 years, as some sources date it to the 14th century.

It currently houses Chequers, a nighttime venue, in the building since 1994.

=== St Giles' Church ===
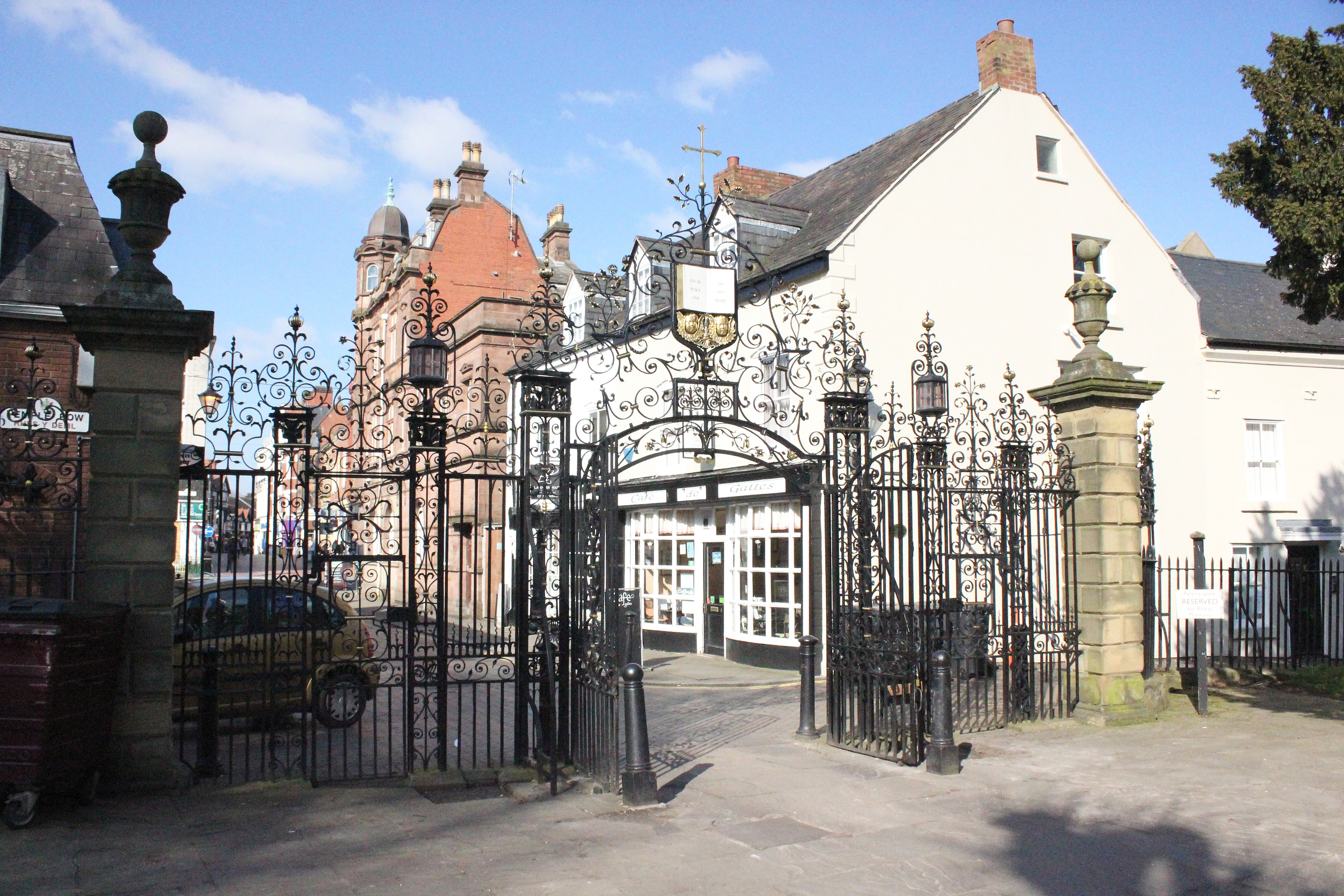
St Giles' Church main gates located between Church Street and the grounds of the church.

Located at the end of Church Street is St Giles' Church, which is separated from the street by its church gates.

==== Gates ====
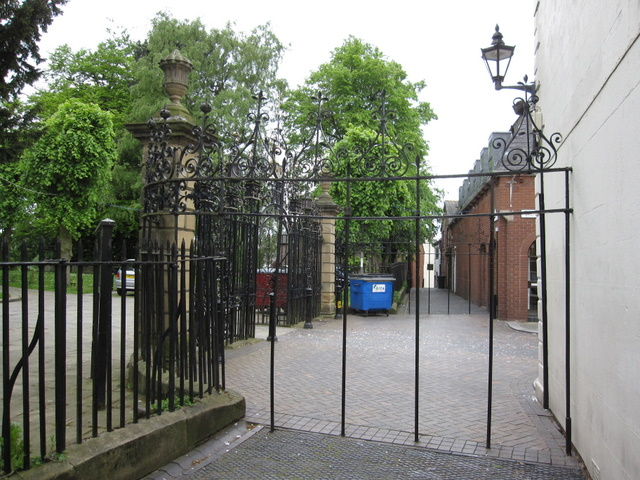
St Giles' Church Gates, from the eastern side gates on Temple Row, across Church Street and the main gates to the western side gates on the rest of Temple Row.

The main entrance to the churchyard of St Giles' Church is bounded by wrought iron gates. Erected in 1720, the churchyard gates were made by the Davies brothers of Bersham, with the gates also restored in c. 1820 and 1900. Sometime after 1821, the gates were slightly moved from their original location. The gates are principally aligned with the north-west door of the church and with Church Street. While the iron gates are bounded by side arches over Temple Row and towards College Street. The gates are double gates and centrally arches, while the side gates are also arched and of a lower height. There are wrought iron gate piers either side of the main and side gates, they have hollow square sections, highly enriched, with leaf and flower-detailed overthrow. The gates separate the street from the church.

== History ==
Church Street first appeared in the 1620 survey by John Norden, retaining a medieval character. In the early 18th century it was sometimes known as "Church Yard Street". The name "Church Street" was first recorded in 1692. The street was described by Wrexham County Borough Council as having a juxtaposition of contrasting building façades, as it contains those of the half-timbered, stucco and gable types.

The street has served as a location of Wrexham's Victorian Christmas Market held annually in December.

=== Other buildings ===
On the corner of Church Street and Town Hill is currently the 1-5 bar/restaurant facing Town Hill. It is located in a concrete building, which replaced a previous structure that was demolished in 1961. The current building was remodelled into the current bar following the building being damaged by a fire in the 1990s.

On the corner of Church Street and College Street, was the location of the former Horton's pawn brokerage, which was present here for several years. It was demolished in 1972, despite local opposition. The new building located on this site was designed by local firm G. Raymond Jones and Associates.

The building on the corner of Church Street and Temple Row, was proposed to be demolished in around the 1970s, but such plans were refused and the building was renovated instead.

No. 5 and No. 6 dates to the 15th century and is a four-bay cruck hall house. It was rebuilt in the late 17th century, possibly in 1681, as a storeyed house. At this time a new floor and dormer window were inserted. It has a medieval framework on its first floor.

On the corner of Church Street and High Street, stands 43 High Street.
