= Wrexham city centre =

Central district of Wrexham, north Wales

Coordinates: 53°02′42″N 2°59′41″W

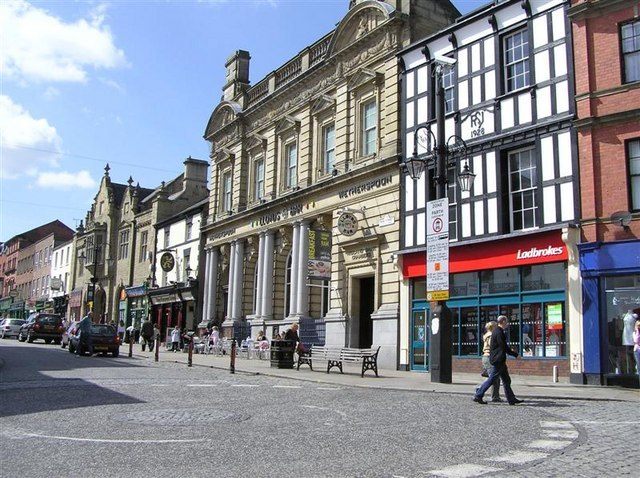
The High Street, centred on The Midland

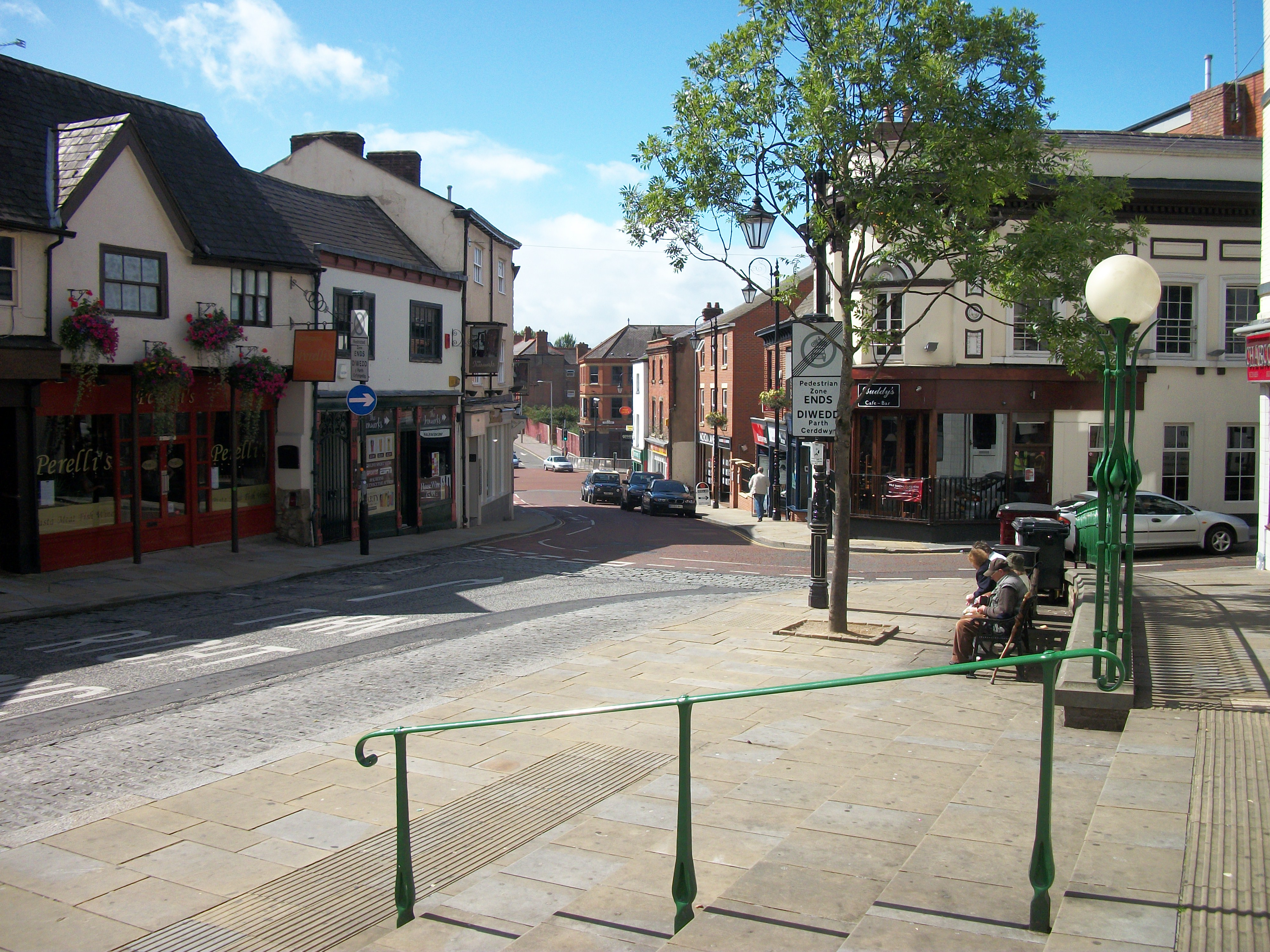
Town Hill

Wrexham city centre is the administrative, cultural and historic city centre of Wrexham, in North Wales and is the area enclosed by the inner ring road of the city. It is the largest shopping area in north and mid Wales, and the administrative centre of Wrexham County Borough. Many of its streets are pedestrianised.

== Definition and geography ==
Wrexham County Borough Council defined a "Wrexham Town Centre" (prior to city status) in their "Town Centre Masterplan" as most of the retail areas adjacent either side or surrounded by a loop of roadways and railways in the centre of the city. This inner city loop roughly comprises Regent Street, Grosvenor Road, Powell Road, Bodhyfryd, Farndon Street, part of Smithfield Road, Eagles Meadow, Salop Road, St Giles Way, Bridge Street (adjacent road), Brook Street, Pentrefelin, Watery Road, and the Shrewsbury–Chester line railway line between Croesnewydd Level Crossing and Wrexham General railway station, before connecting back to Regent Street. A wider Vibrant and Viable Places (VVP) area in the "Town Centre Masterplan" was also defined including most of Caia Park. There can be other definitions of Wrexham city centre.

A smaller "Wrexham Town Centre Conservation Area" encompasses the roads/streets of; Hope Street, part of Regent Street, part of Queen Street, Henblas Street, part of Chester Street, Charles Street, Yorke Street, High Street, Town Hill and Abbot Street, covering most of the 18th and 19th century buildings of the city.

A "city centre postcode" covers Hope Street, Bank Street, High Street, Queen Street, Henblas Street, Town Hill, Chester Street, Brook Street, Charles Street, and Market Street.

Many of the streets in Wrexham city centre are pedestrianised. Politically, Wrexham city centre is split between the four communities (Acton, Caia Park, Offa and Rhosddu) which make up all of Wrexham city.

== History ==
The city centre is Wrexham's medieval core, and as such contains most of its history. The city centre expands outwards from the hill top St. Giles Church, which itself is surrounded by a number of small medieval streets and alleyways.

In the 12th century, the stability brought following the area's conquest by Powys princes, is said to have allowed Wrexham to have developed as a trading town, and later as a market town during the 14th and 15th centuries. The town had important woollen and leather industries, and in 1391 almost half of the inhabitants were economic immigrants attracted by these industries.

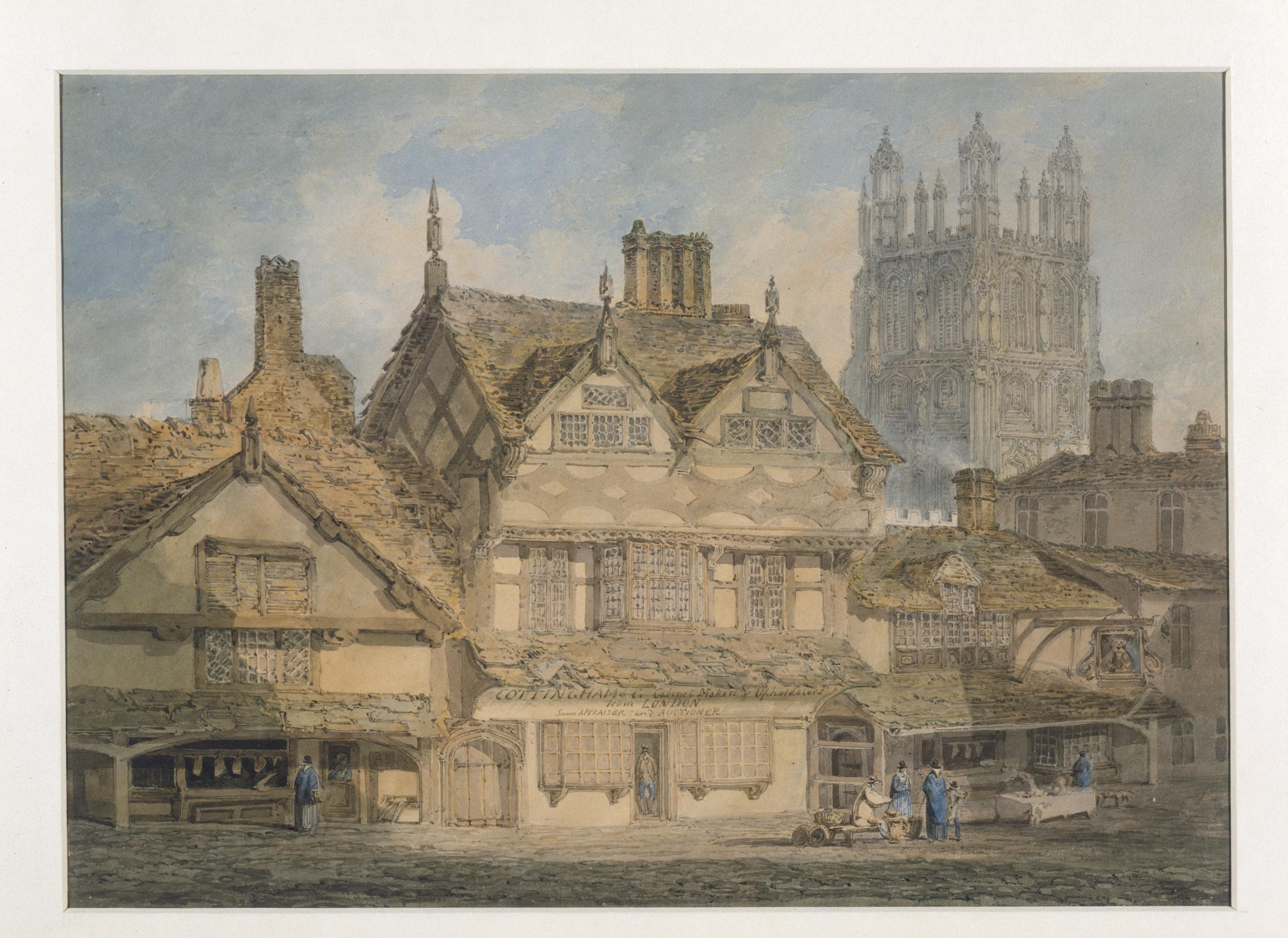
Joseph Mallard William Turner painting of Wrexham, Denbighshire.

In the 17th and 18th centuries, markets and fairs became an important part of the town's economy. Markets were set up throughout the centre, a farmer's market on Hope Street, a butcher's market on Abbot Street and a craft market on High Street. Including traders from Birmingham, Manchester and Yorkshire.

In the late 18th century, purpose-built market courts were built, including the linen and fancy goods Jones's Hall on Queen Street, cloth-centred Yorkshire Square off Tuttle Street, Manchester Square (on the modern site of the General Market), and a hardware market on Birmingham Square (later replaced with the Vegetable Market, then the Henblas Street development). There was a Beast Market at the end of Charles Street, and two ale houses, the Horns Inn on Bridge Street and the Jolly Drovers on Pen y Bryn. The town's first commercial brewery, Thomas' Brewery on College Street opened in the late 18th century. Joseph Mallard William Turner painted views of the town between 1792 and 1794.

From 1833 to 1900, the population grew from 5,500 to 15,000. The town was incorporated in September 1857, establishing the Borough of Wrexham. The Shrewsbury and Chester Railway reached the town in the 1840s, followed by the Wrexham, Mold and Connah's Quay Railway in 1866 and Wrexham and Ellesmere Railway in 1895. New purpose built markets were built, including the Butcher's Marker in 1848, the Butter Market in 1879 and the Vegetable Market in 1910 and 1927. Wrexham's traditional industries grew during the 19th century, including the blacksmithing, brewing, skinning and tanning industry.

During the 19th century, as industrialisation increased, many of the town's timber-framed buildings were replaced or refronted with new architectural materials such as brick and sandstone. By the 1860s there were nineteen local breweries in the town, using supplies of the River Gwenfro running through the town centre, including Wrexham Lager Brewery in modern-day Central Retail Park. By the 20th century breweries such as the Albion, Cambrian, Eagle, Island Green, Soames (later Border Breweries) and Willow, were brewing in the town. Although Border Breweries closed in 1984 and Wrexham Lager in 2000.

By the late 20th century, Wrexham entered an economic depression, traditional industries in the town and surrounding areas declined. Many branch railway lines connecting the town were demolished in the 1960s and 70s. Although the Welsh Development Agency and local authorities funded the A483 dual carriageway in the late 20th century, hoped to alleviate the economic troubles of Wrexham, improving connectivity northwards to Chester and beyond. In the 21st century, rail links to Cardiff were improved and various developments of the town centre were built, including Eagles Meadow.

Between 2020 and 2022, there was an increase in restaurants in the area, while a decline in retail shops. By January 2022, following the COVID-19 pandemic in Wales, a fifth of retail stores in the centre were empty.

== Markets ==
Historically Wrexham was a market town. There are two indoor markets in Wrexham, the Butcher's Market and General Market, both within Grade II listed buildings. While the People's Market was redeveloped into Tŷ Pawb. There is also a Monday market in Queen's Square.

Various market squares were historically present in the town, including Manchester Square, Yorkshire Square and Birmingham Square (and later Union Square). Birmingham Square and Manchester Square were located next to each other near present-day Henblas Street. Both were named after the area their traders mainly came from, with many Birmingham traders selling hardware goods while the Manchester traders sold textiles. While Yorkshire Square, was located where Tuttle Street now stands, and was where Yorkshire traders sold their leather goods. All three sites housed temporary market structures, which served as their market halls. These were gradually replaced from the late 19th century by more permanent structures, with Manchester Square replaced by the Butcher's and General Market. While Birmingham Square (which later became known as Union Square, with the market hall being known as Union Hall) was replaced by the now demolished Vegetable Market, and a Public Hall which later caught fire in 1907.

A Beast Market was also present in the town, which lasted from the medieval times until the 1990s, and where various farmers from the Welsh hills and Cheshire Plain traded their livestock in the market.

The People's Market was built in 1992 as part of a wider redevelopment of the town. It was the newest of the indoor market's of Wrexham, and replaced the Vegetable Market nearby, itself established in 1898, but its Tudor Revival façade was demolished in 1990 for the People's Market.‌‌‍‌‌‌‌‌‍‌‌‌‌‍‌‌‌‌‌‌‍‌‌‌‌‌ The People's Market was renovated and renamed Tŷ Pawb in 2017.

Of the modern-day markets, the Butcher's Market is the older of the two built in 1848, and was designed by Thomas Penson. While the General Market was opened in 1879, and was originally named the Butter Market, due to its initial focus on the trading of butter.

== Areas ==
Whilst the term 'City Centre' can be used quite liberally in Wrexham, it can be split into a number of smaller distinct areas, which have their own character and purpose within the city. Some of these are officially recognised by Wrexham Council, others are more a description of distinct areas.

=== The High Street and St. Giles ===
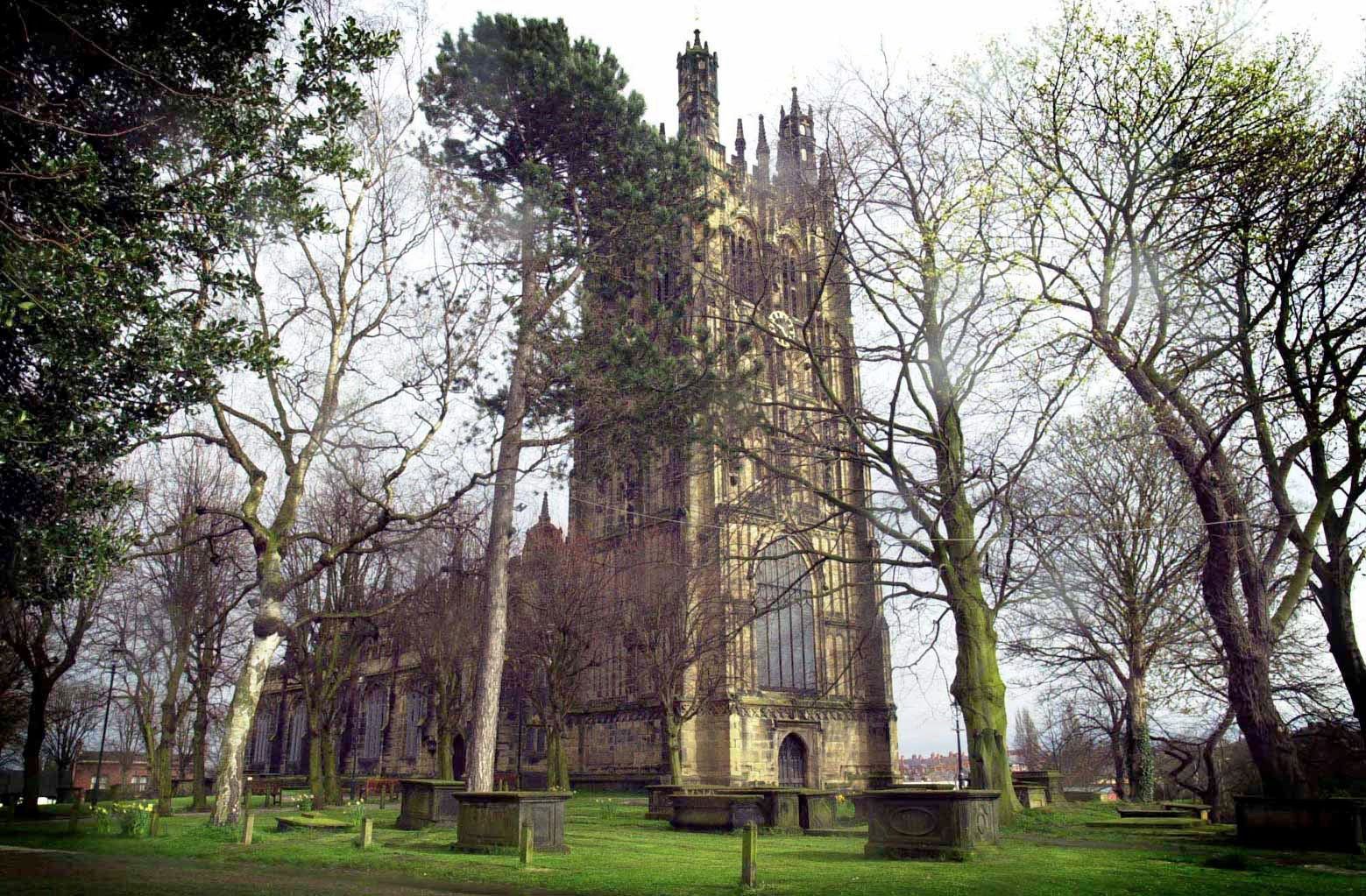
St Giles Church Steeple - One of the Seven Wonders of Wales

This is Wrexham's original city centre, beginning at the church of St Giles. This area was once the traditional High Street of the city containing most of its traditional shops and markets. It is now home to most of Wrexham's night-life including clubs, bars and restaurants. During the day the main attractions are the area's cafes and the historic 'Butchers Market' hall situated on High Street. The church of St Giles is one of the Seven Wonders of Wales and often noted as the finest example of Gothic architecture in Wales. It is also home to the tomb of Elihu Yale.

=== Eagles Meadow ===
Eagle's Meadow is an open-air shopping centre in the south-east of the city centre. Opened in 2008, the complex is situated between Yorke Street and the inner ring road at Smithfield. The area incorporates a number of new buildings and public spaces, and includes a bridge to Yorke Street and an entrance in the style of the 'Spanish Steps' in Rome. Eagle's Meadow holds many top highstreet chain stores over two levels, alongside an 8-screen cinema and 24-lane 10 pin bowling alley. It occupies the site of a former car-park and Asda superstore.

=== Civic Centre ===
Formerly known as the Civic Centre this quarter of the city centre can be thought of as everything north of Holt and Lampbit Street and east of Rhosddu Road. The area is bisected north to south by Chester Street. The area consists almost entirely of public services, arts and media centres. It is home to Wrexham County Borough Council HQ, North Wales Police (Eastern Division) HQ, BBC Wales (Wrexham) Studios, ITV Wales (Wrexham Bureau), Library and Arts Centre, Yale College of Wrexham, Wrexham Waterworld and a number of criminal and civil law courts. The area is also home to Llwyn Isaf, one of the city centre's largest green areas.

=== Island Green ===
Formerly an industrial area the location was home to the Island Green Brewery and Wrexham Central railway station. It is now a shopping area, developed in the late 1990s. The old oast houses used in the Brewery are now converted into apartments aside the River Gwenfro, which cuts through the shopping area. During re-development the railway station was moved 500 yards west, and the station now sits inside the shopping area. Trains run from Wrexham Central to local suburban stations, Deeside, the Wirral and Wrexham General for connections onto inter-city services.

=== Main shopping area ===
The main arteries of the city centre link all previous areas. Running in an easterly direction from Grosvenor Road, Regent Street and Hope Street are the main shopping streets within the city, terminating at the base of St Giles' Church on Church Street, next to High Street. Leading off these streets are a number of other streets, including Queen Street. The majority of this area is pedestrianised, and contains a number of notable landmarks including the thatched 'Horse & Jockey' pub and mock Tudor architecture at Hope St/Queen St.

=== Queens Square ===
The square is the focal point in the city centre. It plays host to daily events, Christmas celebrations and weekly markets. The square merges with Llwyn Isaf.

=== Parciau (including Pen-y-Bryn) ===
The name "Parciau" was given to the land around what is now Bellevue Park in 1908, prior to the park's construction. A substantial Victorian park built to commemorate the Jubilee of Wrexham's charter. The park is known for its bowl, which holds many summer musical events. Bridge Street, Pen-y-Bryn and Ruthin Road all surround the park.
