= River Gwenfro =

Gwenfro Afon Gwenfro
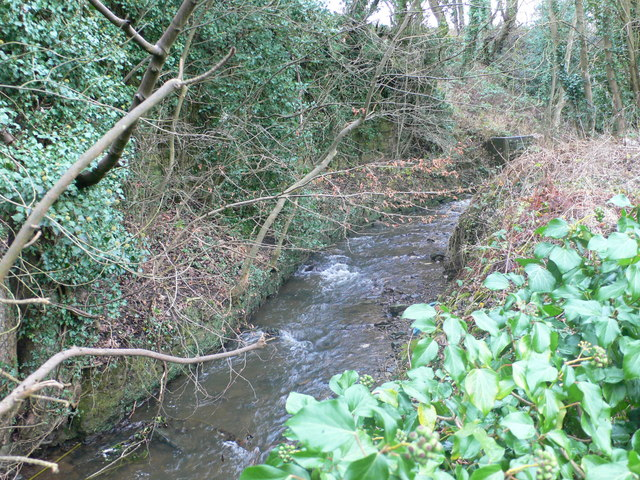
- The Gwenfro, near Tanyfron.

Location
- Country: Wales
- Counties: Wrexham County Borough

Physical characteristics
- Source: Fynnon y Ceirw
  - location: Bwlchgwyn, Wrexham County Borough
  - coordinates: 53°4′19″N 3°5′27.7″W
- Mouth: River Clywedog
  - location: near Wrexham
  - coordinates: 53°2′8.2″N 2°58′28.8″W

The River Gwenfro (Welsh: Afon Gwenfro) is a small river in Wrexham County Borough, north Wales. It is a tributary of the Clywedog. The name Gwenfro is possibly derived from the Welsh language words gwen (feminine of gwyn), "white", and bro, "border", "boundary". (However bro here means "vale", and gwen is likely to mean "holy", thus "holy vale".)

The river rises at a number of small springs south and east of the village of Bwlchgwyn, including a place called Ffynnon y Ceirw ("spring of the stags"). It flows eastwards for several miles through a rather deep valley, and is joined by several other streams; it then passes through Wrexham city centre, where it is largely culverted, and joins the Clywedog at King's Mills.

The section of the river that passes through Wrexham city centre was culverted in 1881 and now passes beneath Brook Street.

The Gwenfro was an important water source for Wrexham industry and has had pollution issues. Although still periodically affected – an incident in 2006 led to a fine for Welsh Water – fish including brown trout and roach are now present.
