= St Giles' Church, Wrexham =

Coordinates: 53.0442°N 2.9927°W

St Giles' Church
- The Parish Church of St Giles
- Eglwys San Silyn
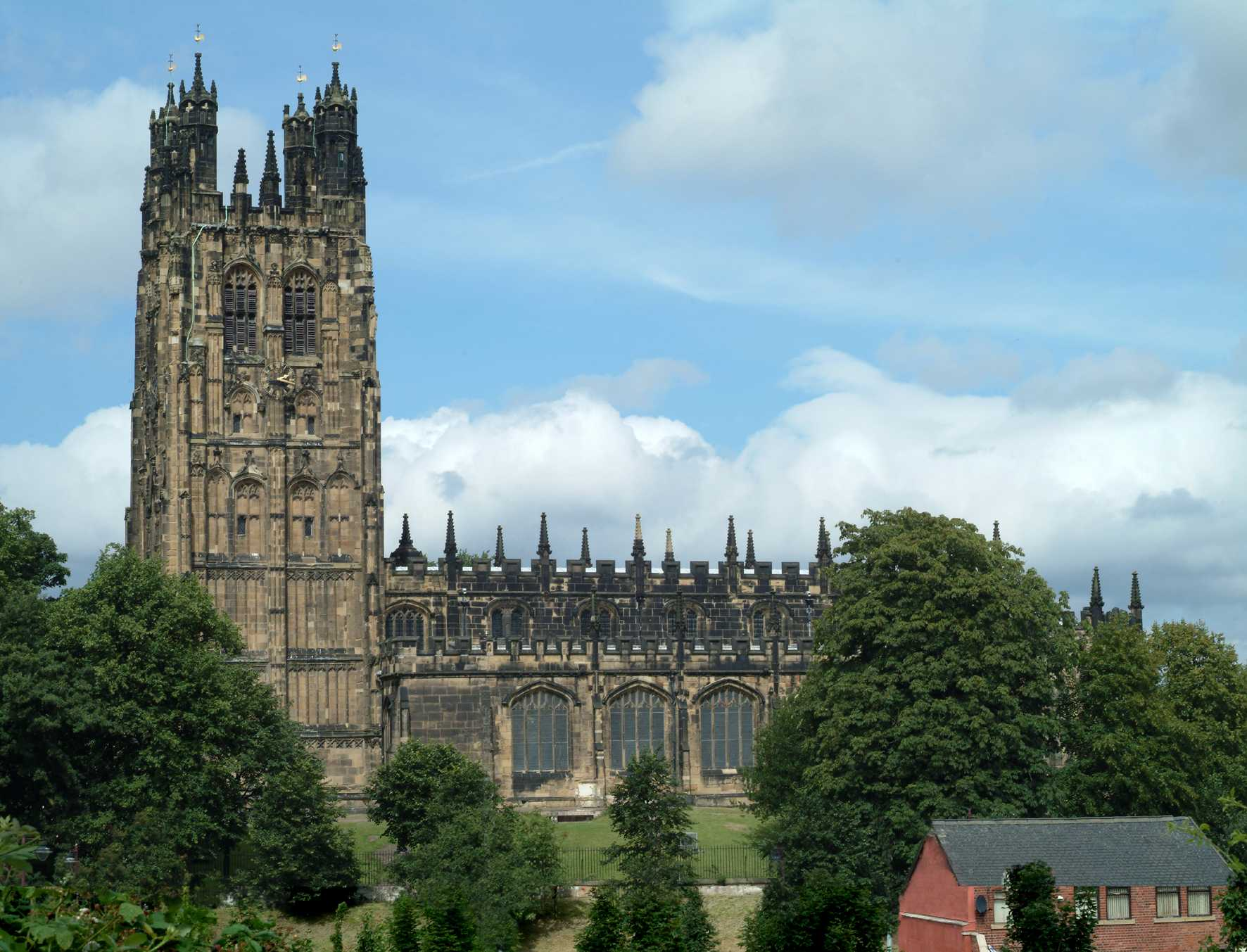
- "The Glory of the Marches".
- St Giles' Church
- Location: Church Street, Wrexham, Wrexham County Borough, LL13 8LS
- Country: Wales
- Denomination: Church in Wales
- Website: St Giles' Church

History
- Status: Active

Architecture
- Functional status: Parish church
- Heritage designation: Grade I listed
- Style: Perpendicular
- Years built: c. 16th century

Administration
- Diocese: Diocese of St Asaph
- Parish: Wrexham

Clergy
- Vicar(s): The Reverend Robert James Tout (Vicar and Mission Hub Leader)

St Giles' Parish Church (Welsh: Eglwys San Silyn) is the parish church of Wrexham, Wales. The church is recognised as one of the finest examples of ecclesiastical architecture in Wales and is a Grade I listed building, described by Sir Simon Jenkins as 'the glory of the Marches' and by W. D. Caröe as a “glorious masterpiece.”

The iconic 16th-century tower rises to a height of 41 m (136 feet) and is a local landmark that can be seen for many miles around. It forms one of the 'Seven Wonders of Wales'.

St Giles' occupies a site of continuous Christian worship for at least 800 years. The main body of the current church was built at the end of the 15th century and beginning of the 16th centuries. It is widely held to be among the greatest of the medieval buildings still standing in Wales.

The church contains numerous works of note including decorative carvings and statuary dating from the 14th century, monuments by Roubiliac and Woolner, a stained-glass window attributed to Burne-Jones and one of the oldest brass eagle lecterns in Britain.

The tomb of Elihu Yale, benefactor of Yale University in New Haven, Connecticut, is located in the churchyard. In recognition of this connection, 'Wrexham Tower' of Saybrook College in the university was modelled on the tower of St Giles'.

== History ==
A chapel in this area is believed to have been founded by the Celtic saint Silin (also known as 'Silyn'). A reference in 1620 to a piece of land called Erw Saint Silin (‘St Silin’s acre’) in the township of Acton in Wrexham Parish, highlights the saint's importance in the area. Both 'Silin' and 'Giles' can be translated into Latin as Aegidius and by 1494 the Church was known as 'Saint Giles'.

There may have been a church in the city as far back as the 11th century and the present church is likely the third to have been built on the site. The earliest reference to the church was 1220 when the Bishop of St Asaph gave the monks of Valle Crucis in Llangollen 'half of the [income of the] church ' of the town of Wrexham. In 1247, Madoc ap Gruffydd, Prince of Powys, bestowed upon the monks of Valle Crucis the patronage of the church of Wrexham.

In 1330, the church tower was blown down by severe gales which resulted in a new church being rebuilt on the site in the decorated style, some features of which form the basis of the outline of the nave and aisles of the current 15th-century building. Either in 1457 or 1463, the church was gutted by fire and work on the present building was started on the same site and incorporated some features of the 14th century church, such as the octagonal pillars.

The main part of St Giles was built between the end of the 15th and early part of the 16th century. The magnificent ornamentation is rich in dynastic Tudor symbolism and was likely financed by Lady Margaret Beaufort, mother of King Henry VII and wife of Thomas Stanley whose family had strong connections with the Wrexham area.

In 1643, during the English Civil War, soldiers of the Parliamentary army destroyed the original organ which was referred to as 'Ye fayrest organes in Europe'.

In the 18th century, the church was depicted by JMW Turner and described by Samuel Johnson as a 'very large and magnificent church'.

Part of the church used to be Wrexham's first fire station. As there were no fire appliances, people would run from the then town to collect ropes, water, and ladders and would run back. In 2012, wrexham.com placed a webcam pointed at St Giles giving a live view of the church. June 2012 saw a beacon being lit on top of St Giles as part of the Queen's Diamond Jubilee celebrations. In 2015, a rare first edition King James Bible from 1611 was rediscovered after centuries of storage in the church.

== Architecture and artworks ==
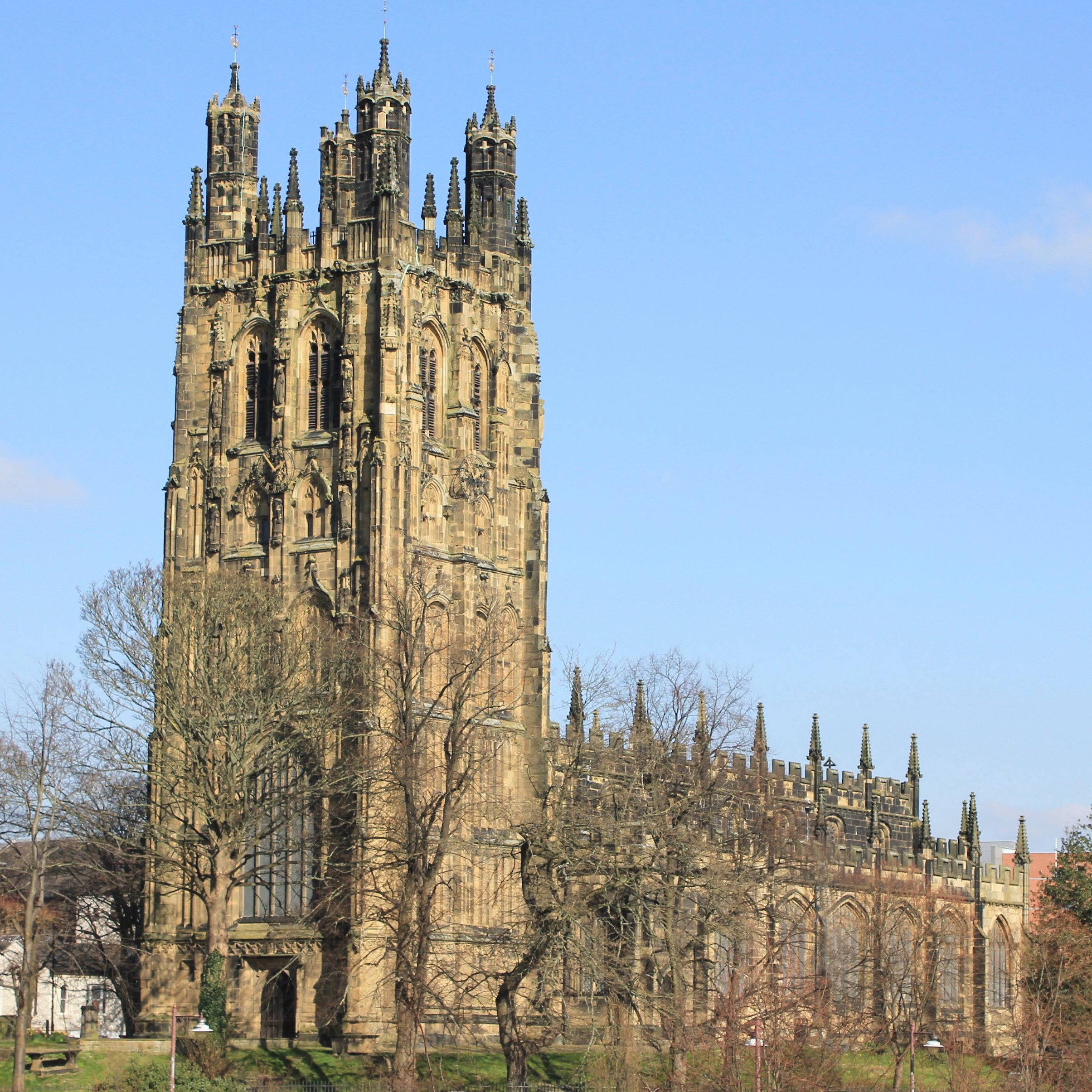
St Giles' Church viewed from the south

The richly decorated five-stage tower, 135-feet high, with its four striking hexagonal turrets, was begun in 1506 and is ascribed to William Hart of Bristol. An example of the Somerset type, it contains 30 niches and is graced by many statues and carvings including those of an arrow and a deer, the attributes of Saint Giles. It is thought that the tower may have been an inspiration for Victoria Tower, at the Palace of Westminster.

The nave arcade is in the Decorated style, and dates from the 14th century, but the remainder of the church is in the late Perpendicular style, and includes an unusual polygonal chancel, similar to that at Holywell, Flintshire, and an echo of the one in the contemporary Henry VII Chapel at Westminster Abbey.

Above the present chancel arch are large parts of an early 16th-century Doom painting, and the arch beneath shows striking evidence of the tracery which one filled it. The interior of the church contains notable carvings and statuary dating from the 14th century and the 16th century camberbeam wooden roof is adorned with wooden polychrome angels playing musical instruments. The church contains numerous monuments, including an elaborate sculptured memorial by Roubiliac. The brass eagle lectern was presented to the church in 1524.

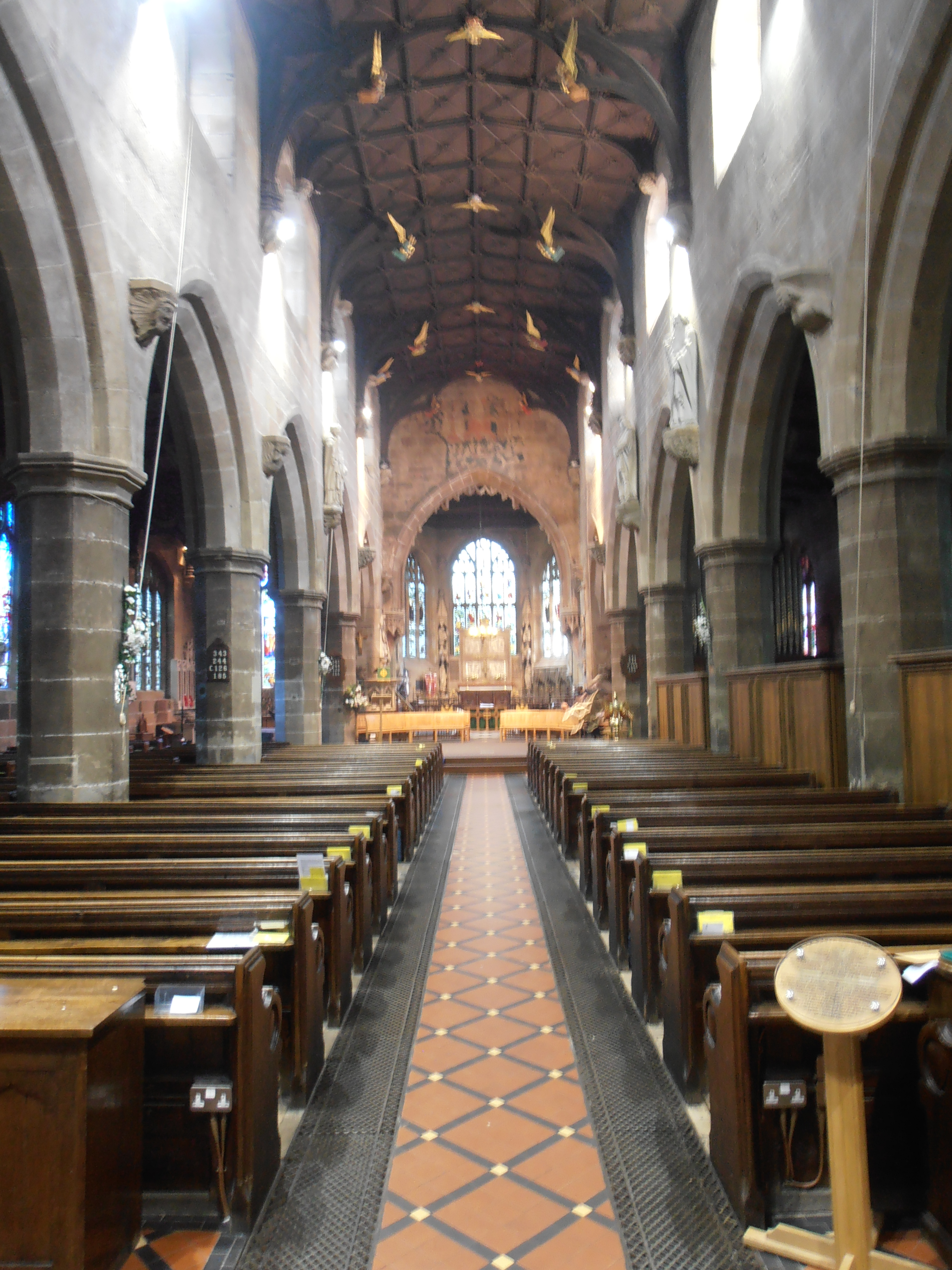
St Giles' Church interior

There are windows by the studio of Burne-Jones in the north aisle and a series of windows by Charles Eamer Kempe and C.E. Kempe and Co in the south aisle. The lyrics of the Evangelical hymn "From Greenland's Icy Mountains", written by Reginald Heber, are etched on a window. The hymn was both composed and first performed at the Church in 1819.

The church contains a medieval effigy which was found buried in the churchyard at the beginning of the 19th century. This depicts a Welsh knight, bare-headed with long hair, who holds a shield emblazoned with a lion rampant and the words 'HIC JACET KENEVERIKE AP HOVEL' ('Here lies Cyneurig ap Hywel').

The churchyard is entered through wrought-iron gates, completed in 1720 by the Davies Brothers of nearby Bersham, who had been responsible for the gates of Chirk Castle, perhaps the finest example of wrought-iron work in Britain, and also made gates at Sandringham House, and at Leeswood Hall, near Mold, Flintshire.

Since 2012, the church's interior has been re-ordered to include a re-modelling of the Chancel as St David's Chapel, and its north aisle is the home of the regimental chapel of the Royal Welch Fusiliers (now part of the Royal Welsh Regiment).

== Clock and chimes ==
In 1735 a clock and chimes were donated by Sir Watkin Williams-Wynn, 3rd Baronet. This required substantial repairs in 1855 to re-instate the chiming mechanism at a cost of £47.

This was replaced by a new clock and chimes installed by Gillett and Bland of Croydon and set going on 2 March 1878 at a cost of £532 (equivalent to £54,750 in 2025).. An additional £150 was spent with Taylor and Co of Loughborough to rehang the bells. The clock was fixed in the tower just below the bells to strike the hours on the tenor bell. The Cambridge Quarters were chimed on the 2nd, 3rd, 4th and 7th bells of the ring. Three skeleton iron dials of 6 feet 6 inches (1.98 m) diameter projected several inches from the tower to avoid interfering with the architectural details of the tower. The figures, minutes and hands were gilt. The clock frame consisted of a cast-iron body 5 feet 3 inches (1.60 m) long, 2 feet (0.61 m) wide and 3 feet (0.91 m) high. The movement was controlled by a double three-legged gravity escapement driven by a temperature compensated pendulum with a beat of 1¼ seconds and a bob of 2 long hundredweight (100 kg).

== Grave of Elihu Yale ==
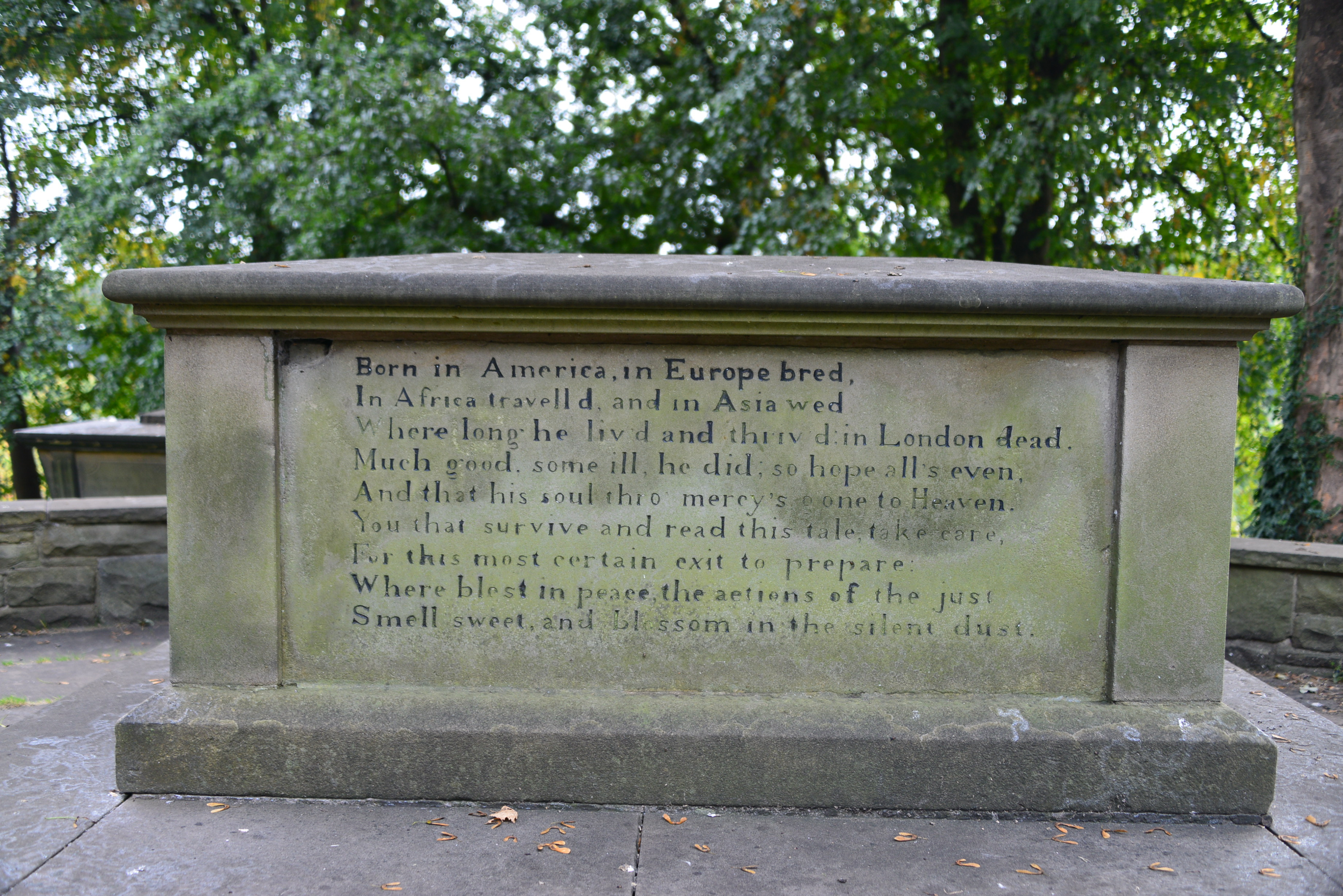
Tomb of Elihu Yale

Just west of the tower is the grave of Elihu Yale, after whom Yale University in the United States is named. The tomb was restored in 1968 by members of Yale University to mark the 250th anniversary of the benefaction. It is inscribed with a self-composed epitaph beginning with the following lines:

Born in America,
in Europe bred,
In Africa travell'd and in Asia wed,
Where long he liv'd and thriv'd;
in London dead

An unsubstantiated rumour suggests that the gravestone was stolen by the Yale University's Skull and Bones society and is displayed in a glass case within the society's hall known as 'The Tomb'. The grave is a Grade II* listed structure.

== Folklore and culture ==
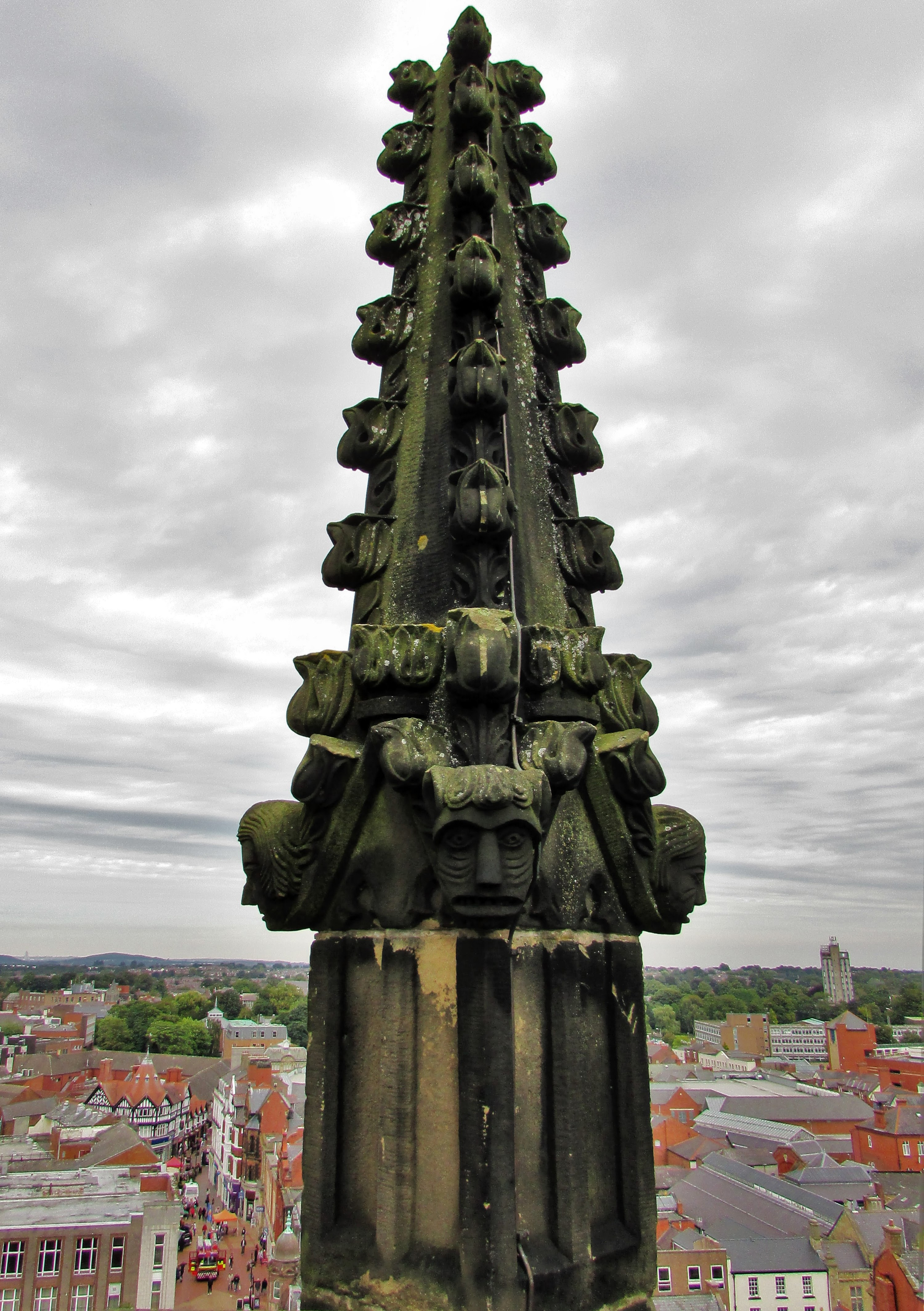
One of the sixteen tower pinnacles

Local legend suggests that work on the church originally commenced at Brynyffynon but that each day's work was destroyed during the night and, as the day's work collapsed, a phantom voice was heard crying "Bryn y Grôg". This voice was taken to be a divine indicator that the church should instead be built on the nearby hill of that name.

The church tower being blown down in 1330 was believed to have been a divine punishment arising from the town's market being held on a Sunday, which resulted in market day being moved to a Thursday. The tower collapsed on St Catherine's day and a statue of St Catherine appears on the east wall of the tower, possible as a form of protection.

A corbel believed to depict Thomas Stanley, 1st Earl of Derby, shows him with the ears of donkey for reasons unknown.

In May 1581, the Catholic martyr St Richard Gwyn was taken to St Giles' and carried around the font on the shoulders of six men and laid in heavy shackles in front of the pulpit. However, he 'so stirred his legs that with the noise of his irons the preacher's voice could not be heard'.

There was a local legend that Oliver Cromwell ordered a cannonball fired at the church tower during the English Civil War.

The church organ is referenced in the late-Jacobean Beaumont and Fletcher play, The Pilgrim (1647), in which the stock Welshman declares that “Pendragon was a shentleman, marg you, Sir, and the organs at Rixum were made by revelations”.

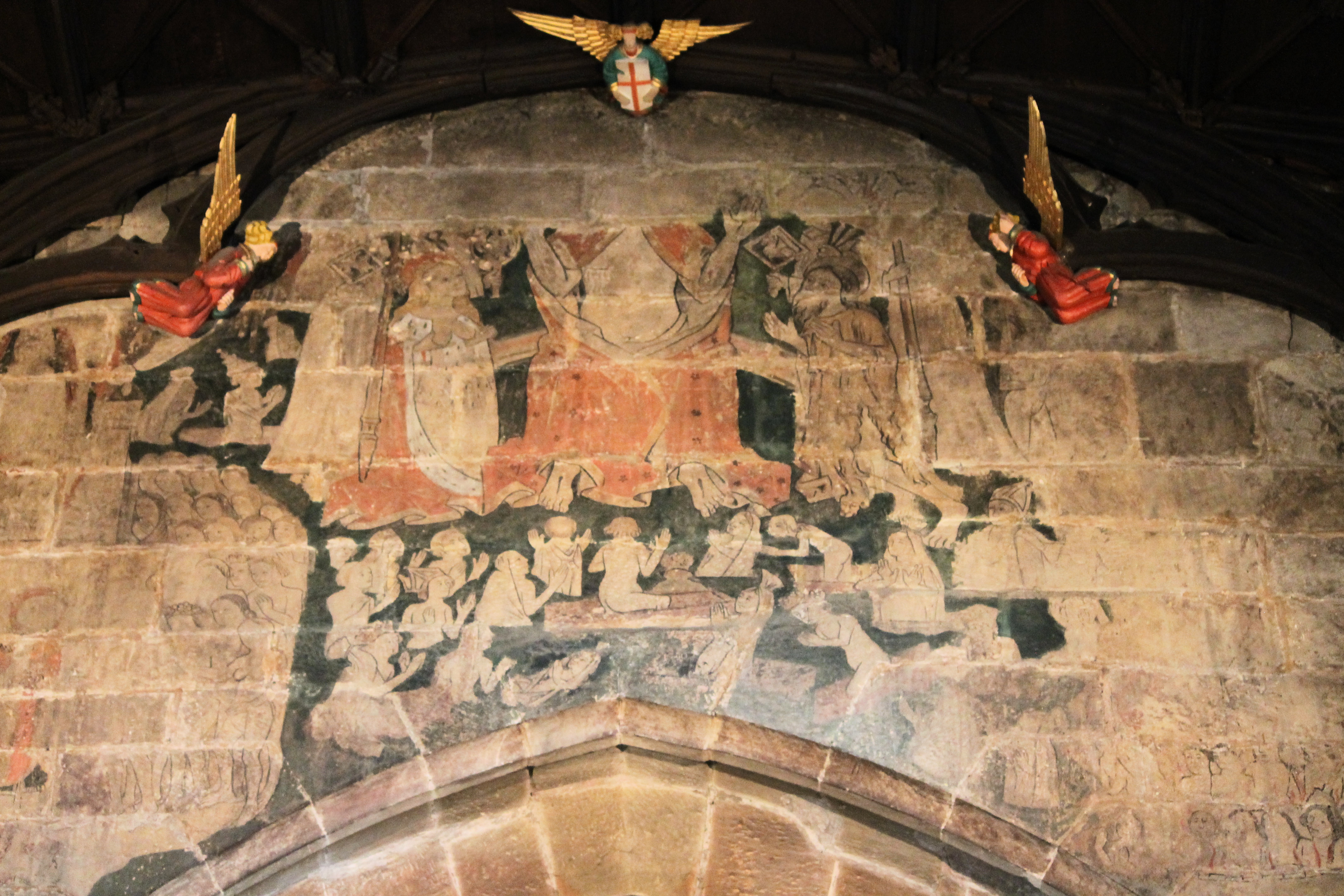
Doom painting over the arch at the east end of the nave

One of the most popular hymns of the 19th century, 'From Greenland's Icy Mountains' was composed by Reginald Heber on a visit to the vicarage and was first sung in public in the church in 1819.

Within Acton Park in Wrexham there is a carved sandstone block which was removed from the Parish Church during the restoration programme of the early 20th century and is reputed to have magical powers so that anyone climbing onto it will be unable to get off.

According to legend, Wrexham city centre is traversed by numerous historic underground tunnels that begin somewhere underneath St Giles Church, and generally end in pubs around the area.

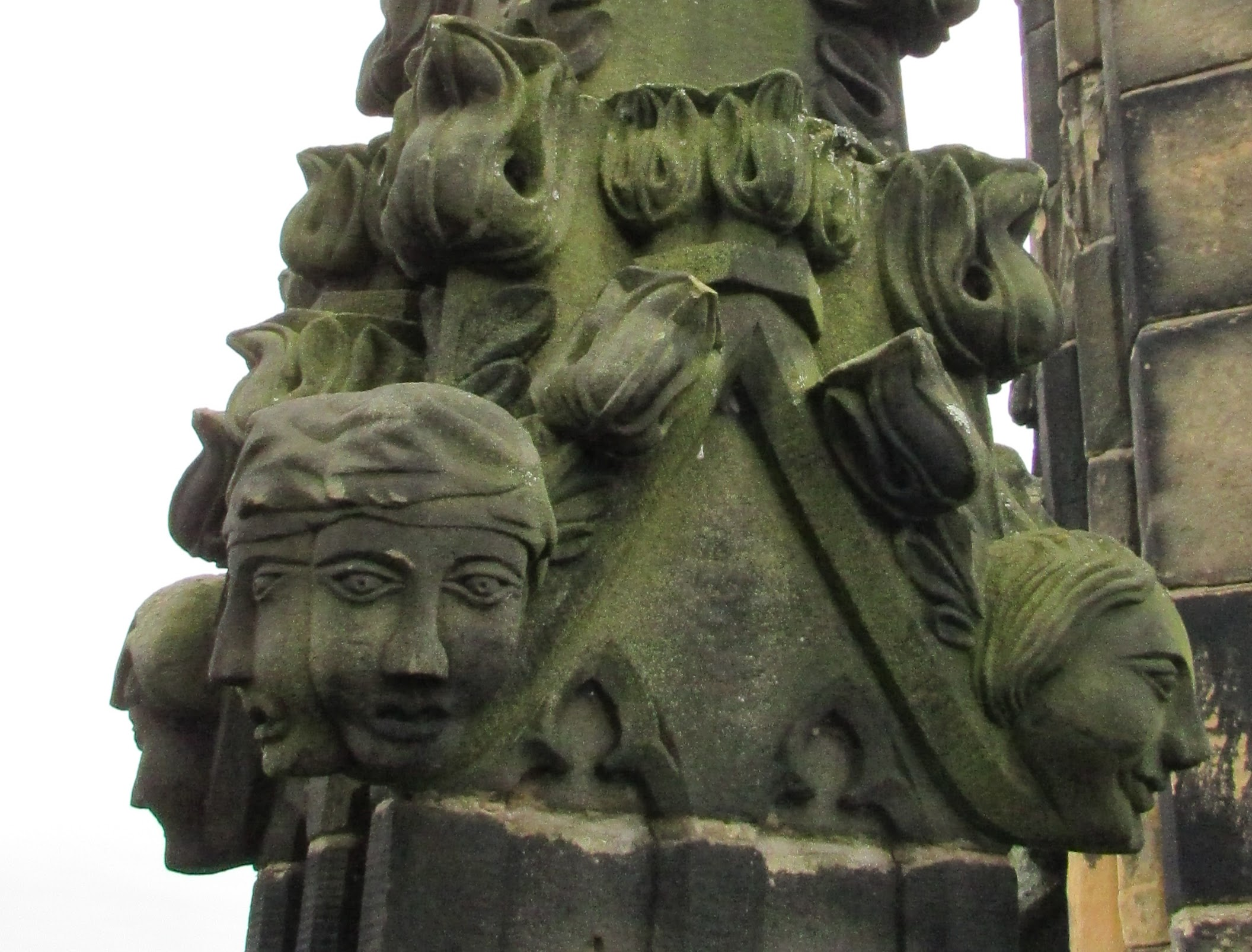
An example of the ornate exterior carvings

The church's tower is traditionally one of the Seven Wonders of Wales, which are commemorated in an anonymously written rhyme:

Pistyll Rhaeadr and Wrexham steeple,
Snowdon's mountain without its people,
Overton yew trees, St Winefride wells,
Llangollen bridge and Gresford bells.

The church's tower is mistakenly called a "steeple" in the rhyme.

== Gallery ==
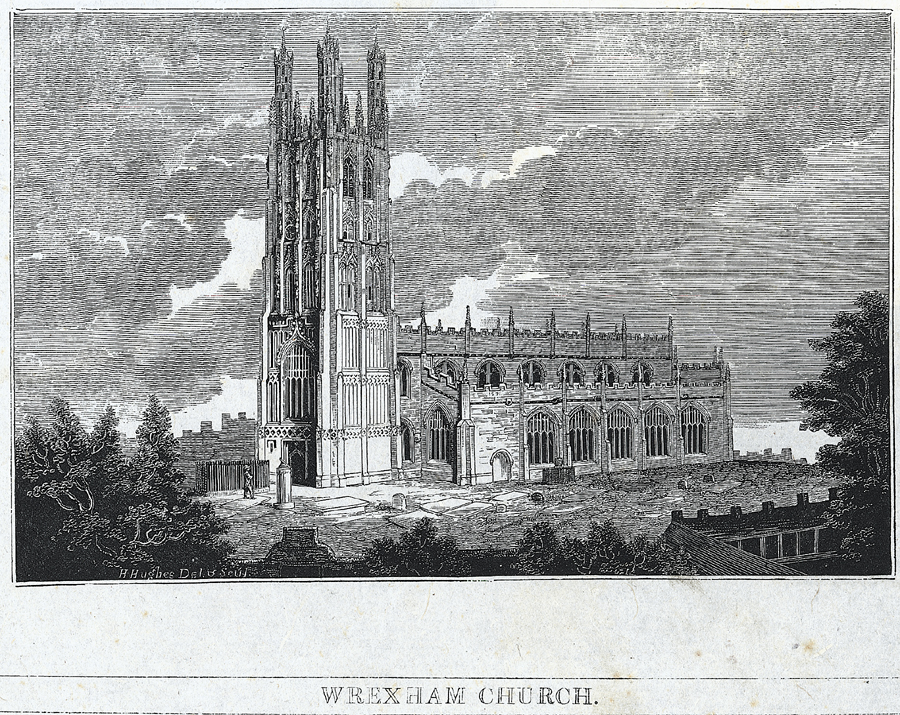
A 19th-century wood engraving view from the south-west

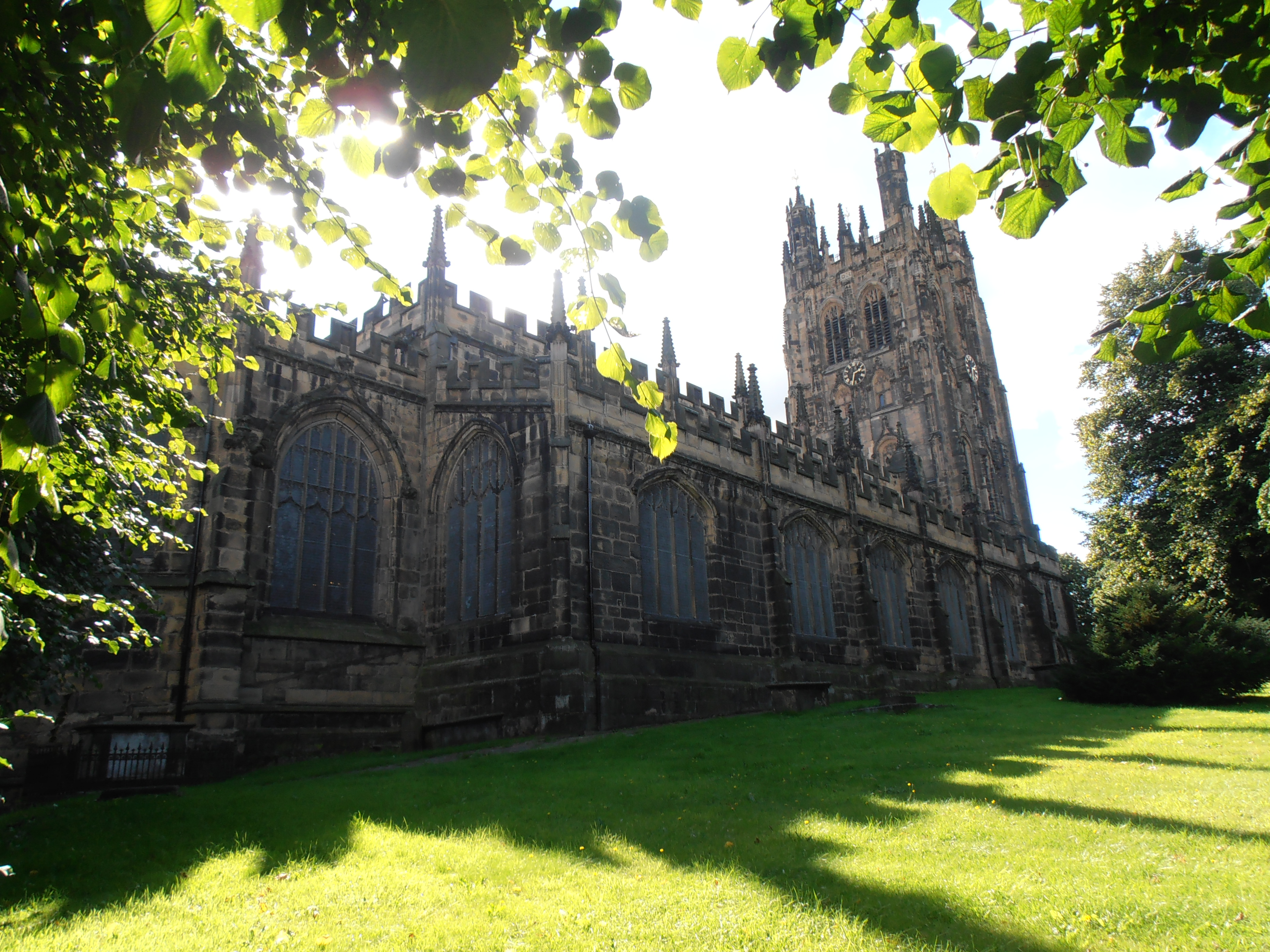
St Giles' Church viewed from the north-east

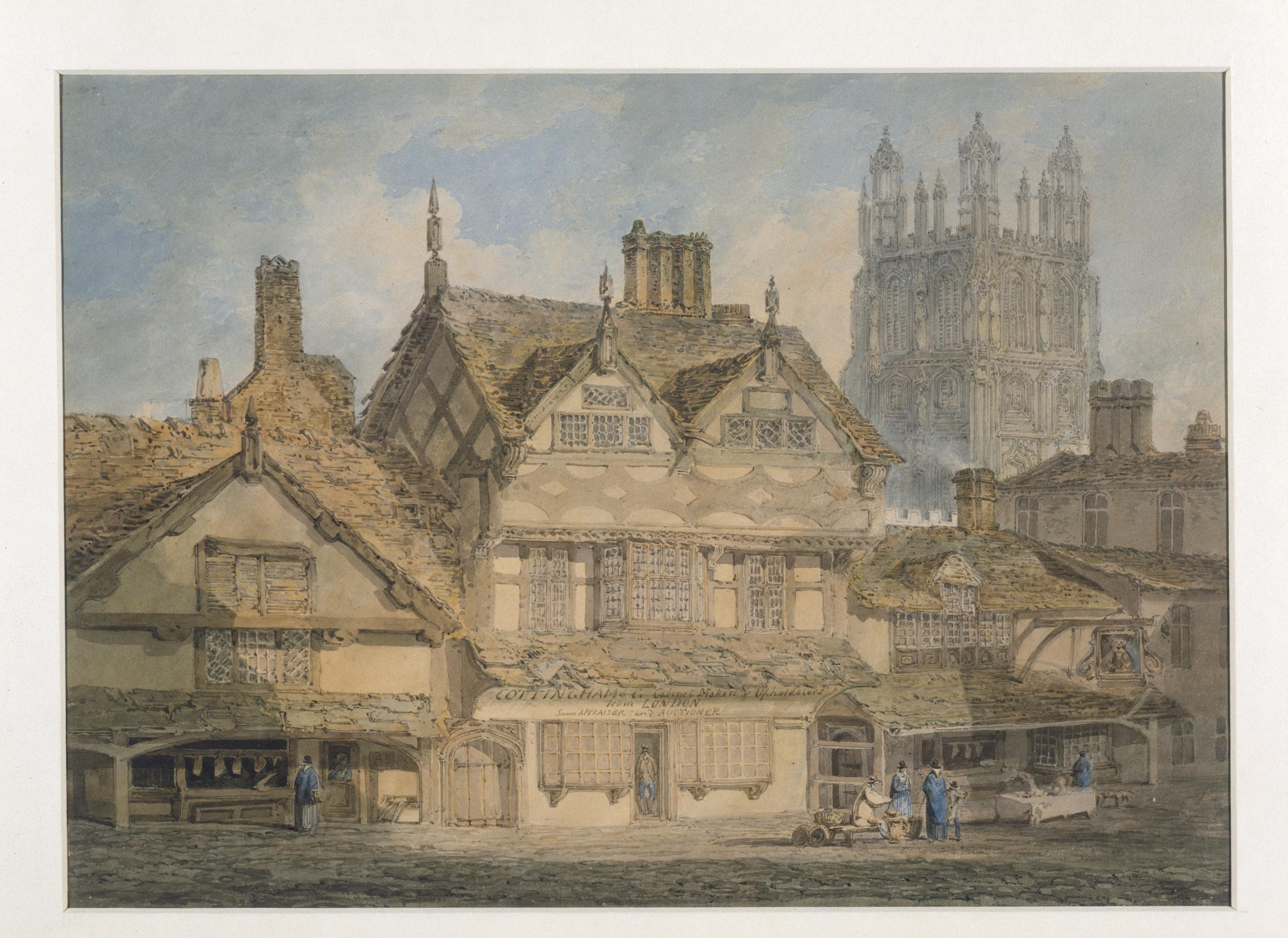
J. M. W. Turner, 'Wrexham, Denbighshire' (watercolour, late 18th century)

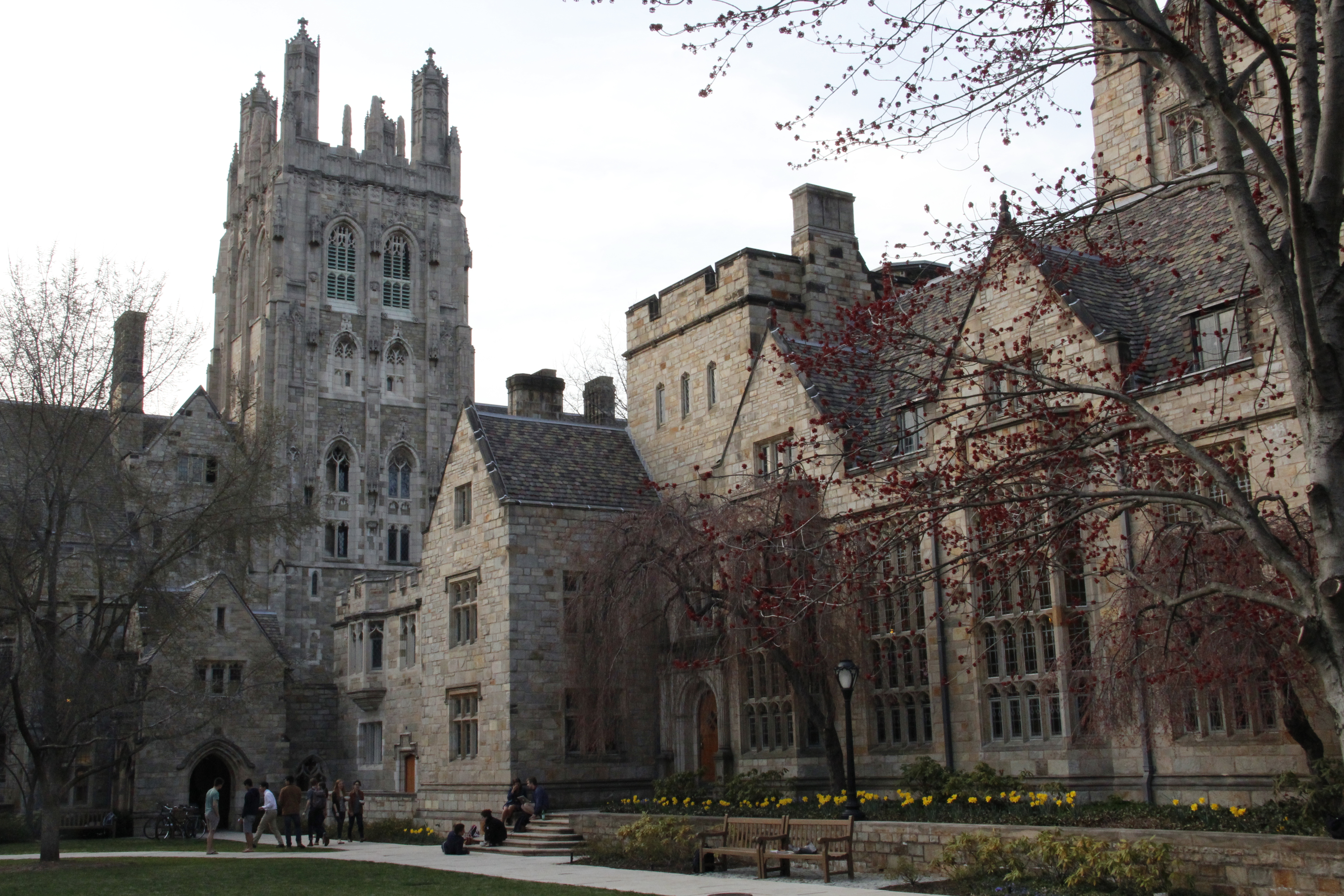
'Wrexham Tower' of Yale University, US

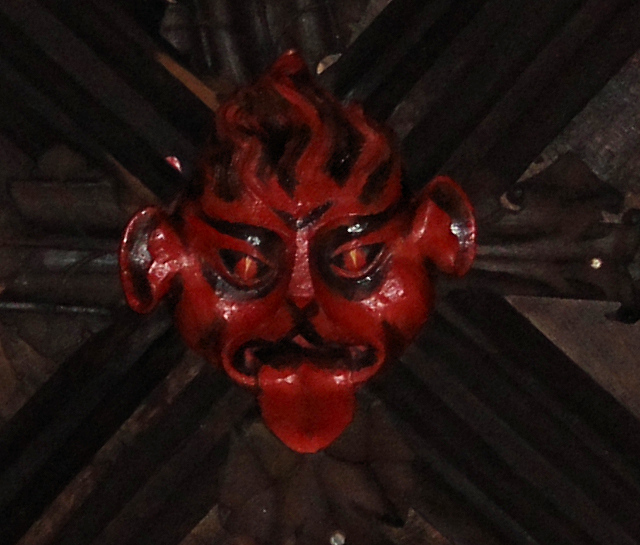
The face of the devil in the nave roof
