= Grade II listed buildings in Offa, Wrexham =

Map of the community in Wrexham County Borough.

In the United Kingdom, the term listed building refers to a building or other structure officially designated as being of special architectural, historical, or cultural significance; Grade II structures are those considered to be "buildings of special interest which justify every effort being made to preserve them". Listing was begun by a provision in the Town and Country Planning Act 1947. Once listed, strict limitations are imposed on the modifications allowed to a building's structure or fittings. In Wales, the authority for listing under the Planning (Listed Buildings and Conservation Areas) Act 1990 rests with Cadw.

This is a list of the 71 Grade II listed buildings in the community of Offa, in Wrexham County Borough.

Name	Location Grid Ref. (Note: Sometimes known as OSGB36, the grid reference is based on the British national grid reference system used by the Ordnance Survey.) Geo-coordinates	Date Listed	Type/Function	Notes	Reference Number	Image
5 Fairy Road, Wrexham, Clwyd, LL13 7PT	Offa; SJ3316549638; 53.03982°N 2.998249°W	31 January 1994	Domestic		1780	–
7 Fairy Road, Wrexham, Clwyd, LL13 7PT	Offa; SJ3317049642; 53.039856°N 2.9981753°W	31 January 1994	Domestic		16480	–
2 Chest Tombs adjacent to W Boundary of Churchyard	Offa; SJ3349150134; 53.044318°N 2.9934903°W	16 June 1980	Domestic		1773	–
2 Chest Tombs to west of Church of St Giles	Offa; SJ3351650127; 53.044259°N 2.993116°W	16 June 1980	Religious, Ritual and Funerary		1772	–
29 High Street	Offa; SJ3359150203; 53.044951°N 2.9920132°W	31 January 1994	Domestic		1785	–
36 High Street	Offa; SJ3355550202; 53.044937°N 2.9925499°W	16 June 1980	Domestic		1790	–
4 Chapel Street	Offa; SJ3335249974; 53.042863°N 2.9955301°W	16 June 1980	Commercial		1768	–
Adult Education Centre, University College of North Wales	Offa; SJ3305350560; 53.048092°N 3.000111°W	22 March 1990	Domestic		1805	–
Beechley	Offa; SJ3371749723; 53.040652°N 2.9900352°W	16 June 1980	Religious, Ritual and Funerary		1795	–
Boundary Wall and Gates to Roman Catholic Cathedral	Offa; SJ3316750496; 53.047531°N 2.9983974°W	31 January 1994	Domestic		1802	–
Bridge over River Clywedog	Offa; SJ3278148803; 53.032267°N 3.0038008°W	31 January 1994	Domestic		1779	–
Burton Buildings	Offa; SJ3336350087; 53.04388°N 2.9953895°W	31 January 1994			1764	–
Cemetery Chapels	Offa; SJ3272649548; 53.038956°N 3.0047765°W	31 January 1994	Domestic		1807	–
Dodman's	Offa; SJ3347550183; 53.044757°N 2.993739°W	16 June 1980			1818	–
Embassey Public House	Offa; SJ3356250191; 53.044839°N 2.9924432°W	31 January 1994			1789	–
Former Border Brewery Chimney	Offa; SJ3360650078; 53.043829°N 2.9917637°W	31 January 1994	Domestic		1819	–
Former County Buildings	Offa; SJ3317750434; 53.046975°N 2.9982354°W	15 June 1990	Domestic		1800	–
Former Crossing Keeper's Cottage at Croesnewydd North Fork	Offa; SJ3281050355; 53.046219°N 3.0036924°W	31 January 1994	Domestic		1820	–
Former Island Green Brewery including Former Malthouse	Offa; SJ3320350260; 53.045415°N 2.9978115°W	09 July 1981	Domestic		1763	–
Former Wrexham Infirmary	Offa; SJ3308050517; 53.047709°N 2.9996994°W	22 March 1990	Domestic		1804	–
Gate Piers and Boundary wall to No 5	Offa; SJ3350549796; 53.041282°N 2.9932116°W	16 June 1980			16489	–
Gate Piers and Boundary Wall to No 5	Offa; SJ3351549789; 53.041221°N 2.9930611°W	16 June 1980	Industrial		16490	–
Gate Piers and Boundary Wall to No.1	Offa; SJ3348249819; 53.041486°N 2.9935594°W	16 June 1980	Industrial		1811	–
Gate Piers to Cemetery	Offa; SJ3273149524; 53.038741°N 3.0046969°W	31 January 1994	Industrial		1809	–
Gates to Cemetery	Offa; SJ3272749523; 53.038731°N 3.0047564°W	31 January 1994			16485	–
Horse and Jockey Public House	Offa; SJ3339650334; 53.046104°N 2.9949485°W	30 May 1951	Religious, Ritual and Funerary		1794	–
Kingsmills Bridge over River Gwenfro	Offa; SJ3472649149; 53.035618°N 2.9748723°W	16 June 1980	Domestic		16475	–
Lodge to Cemetery	Offa; SJ3271549523; 53.03873°N 3.0049353°W	31 January 1994	Domestic		1808	–
Mortuary at Wrexham Cemetery	Offa; SJ3268049503; 53.038545°N 3.005453°W	25 June 2020	Gardens, Parks and Urban Spaces		87790	–
No. 1, Salisbury Road (NE side), Clwyd	Offa; SJ3350549815; 53.041453°N 2.9932156°W	16 June 1980	Religious, Ritual and Funerary		1810	–
No. 3, Church Street (E side), Clwyd	Offa; SJ3352950183; 53.044763°N 2.9929337°W	16 June 1980	Domestic		1775	–
No. 3, Salisbury Road (NE side), Clwyd	Offa; SJ3351149808; 53.041391°N 2.9931246°W	16 June 1980	Commemorative		16487	–
No. 37, High Street (S side), Clwyd	Offa; SJ3355550187; 53.044803°N 2.9925468°W	16 June 1980	Domestic		16481	–
No. 38, High Street (S side), Clwyd	Offa; SJ3354950200; 53.044919°N 2.9926389°W	16 June 1980			1791	–
No. 39, High Street (S side), Clwyd	Offa; SJ3354650201; 53.044927°N 2.9926839°W	16 June 1980			16482	–
No. 4, Church Street (E side), Clwyd	Offa; SJ3353150178; 53.044719°N 2.9929028°W	16 June 1980			16476	–
No. 40, High Street (S side), Clwyd	Offa; SJ3353850200; 53.044917°N 2.992803°W	31 January 1994	Agriculture and Subsistence		1792	–
No. 41, High Street (S side), Clwyd	Offa; SJ3353950194; 53.044864°N 2.9927868°W	31 January 1994			16483	–
No. 42, High Street (S side), Clwyd	Offa; SJ3353250197; 53.04489°N 2.9928918°W	31 January 1994			16484	–
No. 5, Salisbury Road (NE side), Clwyd	Offa; SJ3352149803; 53.041347°N 2.9929745°W	16 June 1980	Commercial		16488	–
No. 1, Chapel Street (N side), Clwyd	Offa; SJ3336650016; 53.043242°N 2.99533°W	16 June 1980	Religious, Ritual and Funerary		1766	–
No. 26, High Street (S side), Clwyd	Offa; SJ3360550207; 53.044989°N 2.9918052°W	31 January 1994	Commercial		1783	–
No. 28, High Street (S side), Clwyd	Offa; SJ3360550207; 53.044989°N 2.9918052°W	31 January 1994	Domestic		1784	–
No. 30, High Street (S side), Clwyd	Offa; SJ3358350205; 53.044968°N 2.9921329°W	31 January 1994	Domestic		1786	–
No. 31, High Street (S side), Clwyd	Offa; SJ3357450198; 53.044904°N 2.9922657°W	31 January 1994	Domestic		1787	–
No. 33 (previously listed as No. 32) High Street (S side), Clwyd	Offa; SJ3356850204; 53.044957°N 2.9923564°W	16 June 1980	Domestic		1788	–
No. 5, Town Hill (S side), Clwyd	Offa; SJ3348850188; 53.044803°N 2.9935462°W	16 June 1980	Religious, Ritual and Funerary		1816	–
No. 6 (formerly listed as No. 8) Temple Row (N side), Clwyd	Offa; SJ3354050181; 53.044747°N 2.9927692°W	16 June 1980	Religious, Ritual and Funerary		1815	–
No. 9 Fairy Road (N side), Clwyd	Offa; SJ3320449651; 53.039941°N 2.9976702°W	31 January 1994	Commercial		1781	–
Offices and Lodge to Wrexham Lager Brewery	Offa; SJ3298550501; 53.047554°N 3.0011129°W	31 January 1994	Religious, Ritual and Funerary		1765	–
Oteley House	Offa; SJ3363149732; 53.040723°N 2.9913195°W	31 January 1994	Domestic		1812	–
Pen-y-Bryn Welsh Baptist Chapel	Offa; SJ3339249983; 53.042949°N 2.9949354°W	16 June 1980	Commercial		1767	–
Poplar House	Offa; SJ3348749857; 53.041828°N 2.9934927°W	19 April 1989	Health and Welfare		1796	–
Presbytery at roman Catholic Cathedral	Offa; SJ3313550472; 53.047312°N 2.9988697°W	31 January 1994	Domestic		1803	–
Railing to Cemetery	Offa; SJ3283149567; 53.03914°N 3.0032148°W	31 January 1994			16486	–
Roman Catholic Cathedral of St Mary	Offa; SJ3315650468; 53.047278°N 2.9985557°W	31 January 1994	Domestic		1801	–
Sontley Bridge	Offa; SJ3359248498; 53.029627°N 2.9916465°W	31 January 1994	Transport		1814	–
Stafford House	Offa; SJ3327449654; 53.039977°N 2.996627°W	31 January 1994	Domestic		1782	–
Statue of Queen Victoria	Offa; SJ3295050129; 53.044206°N 3.0015574°W	31 January 1994	Domestic		1798	–
Sundial to West of Church of St Giles	Offa; SJ3351550113; 53.044133°N 2.993128°W	16 June 1980	Domestic		1771	–
The Bishops House	Offa; SJ3334049484; 53.038457°N 2.9956076°W	31 January 1994			1813	–
The Bowling Green Public House	Offa; SJ3327649904; 53.042224°N 2.996649°W	31 January 1994	Industrial		1799	–
The Cambrian Vaults Public House	Offa; SJ3344850151; 53.044466°N 2.9941351°W	31 January 1994	Agriculture and Subsistence		1778	–
The Commercial Public House	Offa; SJ3346150147; 53.044431°N 2.9939404°W	31 January 1994	Industrial		1777	–
The Cross Foxes Public House	Offa; SJ3341450249; 53.045342°N 2.9946624°W	31 January 1994	Civil		1760	–
The Former Mines Rescue Centre	Offa; SJ3281150744; 53.049716°N 3.0037588°W	18 August 2010			87623	–
The Nags Head Public House	Offa; SJ3362550089; 53.043931°N 2.9914826°W	31 January 1994	Domestic		1797	–
The Old Swan Public House	Offa; SJ3342550213; 53.04502°N 2.9944909°W	16 June 1980	Domestic		1761	–
The Old Three Tuns Public House	Offa; SJ3329150216; 53.04503°N 2.99649°W	31 January 1994	Domestic		1821	–
Trustee Savings Bank	Offa; SJ3352350198; 53.044898°N 2.9930263°W	31 January 1994	Domestic		1793	–
Willow Bridge, with adjacent Railings and Culvert Arch	Offa; SJ3370249916; 53.042385°N 2.9902986°W	31 January 1994	Commercial		1758	–

== See also ==
- Grade II listed buildings in Wrexham County Borough
- Grade II listed buildings in Acton, Wrexham
- Grade II listed buildings in Caia Park
- Grade II listed buildings in Rhosddu
