= Bryn Offa =

Housing estate in Wrexham, Wales

Coordinates: 53°02′29″N 3°00′38″W

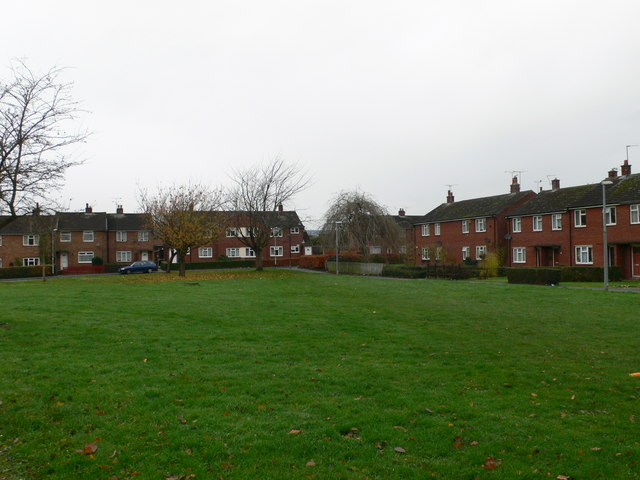
- Photo of the Bryn Offa housing estate.

- Location within Wrexham
- OS grid reference: SJ 32430 49864
- Principal area: Wrexham
- Preserved county: Clwyd
- Country: Wales
- Sovereign state: United Kingdom
- Post town: WREXHAM
- Postcode district: LL13
- Dialling code: 01978
- Police: North Wales
- Fire: North Wales
- Ambulance: Welsh
- UK Parliament: Wrexham
- Senedd Cymru – Welsh Parliament: Wrexham

Bryn Offa (Welsh for 'Offa's Hill') is a local-authority housing estate in the south-western suburbs of the city of Wrexham, in Wrexham County Borough, north-east Wales in the community of Offa, and is close to the Wrexham Maelor Hospital.

The main route through Bryn Offa is the A525 road to Ruthin Road. The estate is situated next to Ysgol Clywedog (formerly known as Ysgol Bryn Offa, or Bryn Offa High School), and the Shrewsbury-Chester railway line. The community of Offa is named after Bryn Offa.

Originally the site was home to Bryn Offa Hall, which was built in the 1860s and was home to Mayor of Wrexham, John Bernard Murless. The building was later sold various times, before ending up in the ownership of the Royal Air Forces Association in 1956, to serve as their Wrexham clubhouse.

The housing estate on the site was first built in the 1950s by Wrexham Borough Council. The first parts to be developed were along the southside of Ruthin Road, between the hall and Bryn Offa School. This first estate replaced a row of houses known as Bryn Offa Terrace, which were demolished as part of the Borough Clearance programme. The housing estate was later extended to Bersham Road in 1957, with the new road built named Centenary Road, to mark Wrexham's 100th anniversary of being incorporated as a borough.

Bryn Offa High School began its construction in 1959, and originally was to be named Emyr Cyfeiliog School, after Alderman Emyr Williams. It opened in 1960 with 510 pupils from other local schools.
