= Island Green =

Retail and former brewing area in Wrexham, Wales

- Y Werddon (Welsh)
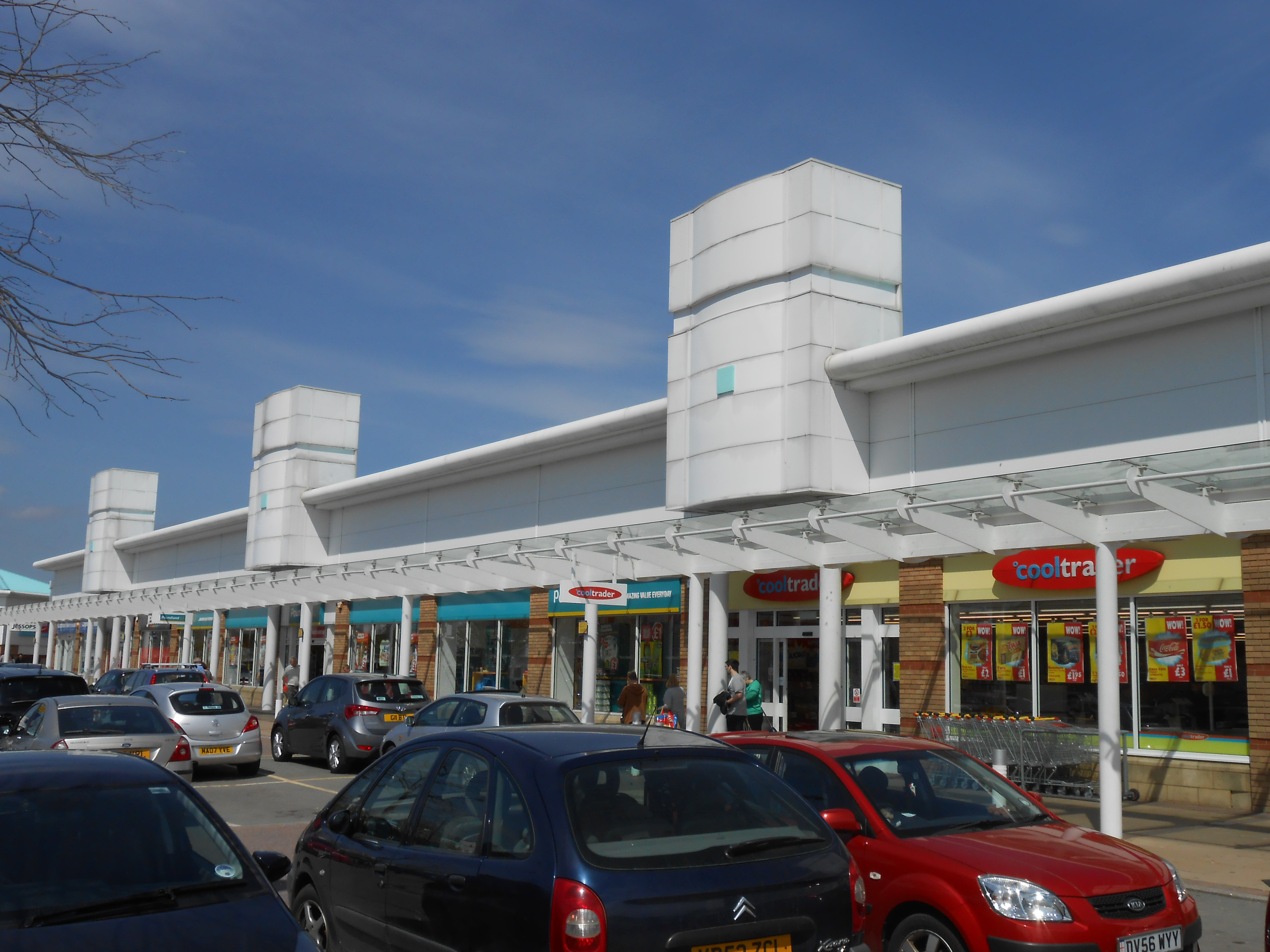
- Shops in the retail park
- Location: Wrexham, Wales
- Coordinates: 53.045431°N 2.997976°W
- Opened: 1999 (on site of 1856 brewery)
- Website: islandgreen.co.uk

Listed Building – Grade II
- Official name: Former Island Green Brewery including Former Malthouse
- Designated: 9 July 1981; Amended 6 May 1997
- Reference no.: 1763

Island Green (Welsh: Y Werddon) is a historic brewing site in Wrexham city centre, North Wales, home to the former site of the Island Green Brewery. Following the closure of the brewery in 1931, and the abandonment of the site in the 1970s, the area was converted into a retail park in 1999, containing Wrexham Central railway station, as well as residences which utilised the former brewery buildings.

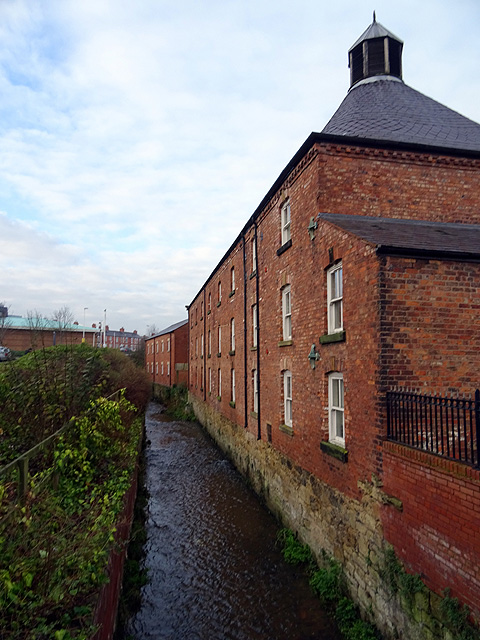
Rear of the former brewery buildings, with the River Gwenfro to the left.

== History ==
By 1841, there was a mansion and estate known as Island Green, in a meadow on the River Gwenfro to the west of the town. The hall was taken over by a brewery following the death of the hall's owner John Bennion. The takeover of the building by the brewery in 1850 was coincided with a decline in the mansion's status as part of a high status area, although it partly regained the status by 1851. The estate also housed a significant (28.9 per cent) Irish-born population, which also grew between 1841 and 1851. The house was originally known as Ireland Green House, but the name evolved into Island Green. The name "Ireland Green" for the area (particularly around Pentre Felin) may have been connected to the Irish who came to Wrexham's markets, although when the name was recorded as "Island Green" in 1833, the high levels of Irish traders was not yet present in Wrexham. The house was demolished in c. 1887 to make way for the Wrexham, Mold and Connah's Quay Railway.

=== Formation of the Island Green Brewery ===
The Island Green Malthouse and Brewery was founded in 1856 by the brothers Williams and John Jones. They learned the trade on Caia Farm on the other side of Wrexham. The two brothers were known locally, and their charitable trust later paid half of the construction of the Wrexham & East Denbighshire Memorial Hospital following World War I. The brewery was within a brick-built double courtyard range, which was later modified with additions in 1890. The brewery initially had a 16 quarter brewhouse and 32 quarter maltings, with one quarter being 8 bushels of barley which would've produced an average of 150 imperial gallons (680 L) of beer. The original buildings were of red-brick with dentil eaves, and slate roofs with reticulated keystone to brick voussoirs and stone plinth. The River Gwenfro runs next to the site, while at the end of Brewery Place. The name of the brewery is from the nearby Island Green House.

On 16 December 1869, the brothers had offered a barrel of ale to the occupants of a local workhouse for Christmas, but such offer was rejected. A board member of the Wrexham Board of Guardians had rejected the offer, as he could do with no ale with his roast beef and plum pudding, and did not see how the paupers would need ale with theirs. Two board members were in favour of the gift, but previous canvassing had indicated 127 inmates of the house were opposed to beer at Christmas compared to 53 in favour. A fund of providing £7 (equivalent to £720 in 2025) was set up instead to provide Christmas treats for the inmates.

In November 1873, through the Wrexham and Denbigh Weekly Advertiser, a tenant of a local farm requested the brewery reduce their in-take of brook water by their brewery's main sewer, as the over-dilution of the sewage and the excess sand it brought with the brook water became "very embarrassing" to the tenant. The brewery did not respond, although the tenant expressed their intention to re-lay the surface pipes, that would have needed to be done to tackle the issue.

Island Green House was demolished in c. 1887 to make way for the Wrexham, Mold and Connah's Quay Railway.

One of the founders, William Jones died in 1904. Following Jones' death, on 12 October 1905, the brewery was put up for sale at an auction in Birmingham. At the time, the brewery included a 16-quarter plant, 54-quarter maltings, stores, stabling, cottages and land. The sale was accompanied with 21 licensed houses and other properties including a leasehold licensed house. The extra properties were "easy road delivery distance" from the brewery, six being within Wrexham and 15 in Wrexham District. They produced £1,435 (equivalent to £150,858 in 2025) in rent per year. The sale was held for "the winding up of [the] estate" and concerns over the increasing old age of John Jones, the last surviving owner of the brewery.

On the following day, 13 October 1905, the brewery had been sold to Francis Osmond Joseph Huntley of Gloucestershire for £73,600 (equivalent to £7,737,364 in 2025), who is said to have partnered under "Huntley & Mowat".

John Jones, the other founder, died in 1913.

In 1927, the brewery purchased the Union Brewery, a brewery first established in 1840 by Charles Bate and Son in the Union Tavern on the edge of Mount Street and Yorke Street, and later moved to Bridge Street.

=== Closure and post-brewery development ===
In 1931, the brewery merged with Soames Brewery of Wrexham and Dorsett Owen of Oswestry to form Border Breweries, with production centred on the Tuttle Street site (near the Nags Head and contains the brewery's landmark chimney) with brewing ceasing on the Island Green site shortly after the merger.

The old Island Green brewery's buildings later became a warehouse, and by 1937 it was a creamery. Cellars of the building were also used by a local dairy after World War II. In the 1970s the site closed down and fell into dereliction.

The former Island Green Brewery, including its former malthouse, were listed as Grade II buildings on 9 July 1981.

In the late 1990s, Wrexham Central railway station and part of the Island Green Brewery site was developed into the Island Green shopping park. Wrexham Central, which originally was near Vicarage Hill and Hill Street, was moved westwards back along the line to a new site next to the Bradley Road bridge.

Following a photographic survey of the old brewery site by the Clwyd-Powys Archaeological Trust in July 1981, the buildings were found to have been built with red brick, with dentil eaves and some with stone mouldings and other detail present. In the southern outer courtyard, there is a former three-storey malting range and twin kilns, which are bounded by brewery buildings to their west and north. In the north-west corner of the site are a pair of brewing towers situated in-between a north cellar range and the western former loading bay range. There is an archway connecting the former loading bay range to the rear courtyard and stable range to provide access.

By 1998, an application was submitted to convert the buildings for residential use. The remaining brewery buildings have since been restored by the RIBA–CIAT Lawray Architects, and converted into 34 residences in a project costing £2–3 million. The Oast Houses and Stables for the dray horses were preserved and adapted into a mix of one and two bedroom apartments and houses. The other buildings were remodelled, with an additional terrace incorporated to replace earlier unstable extensions. A secure courtyard car park and landscaped amenity areas were also constructed. The old building next to Pentre Felin is known as Y Werddon, the same name applied as the Welsh name for the retail park.

== Retail Park ==
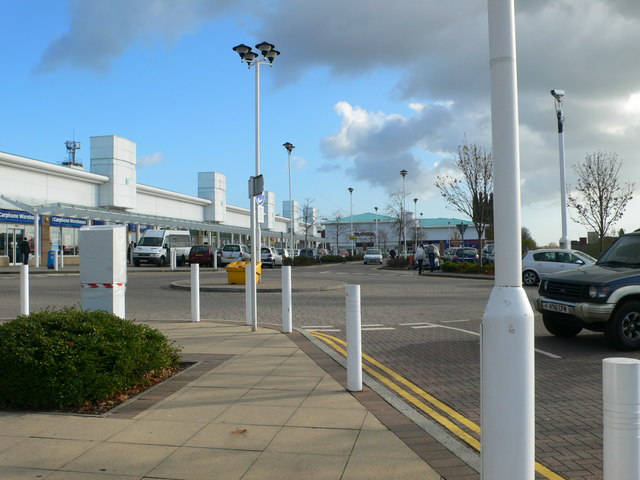
The retail park and its car park

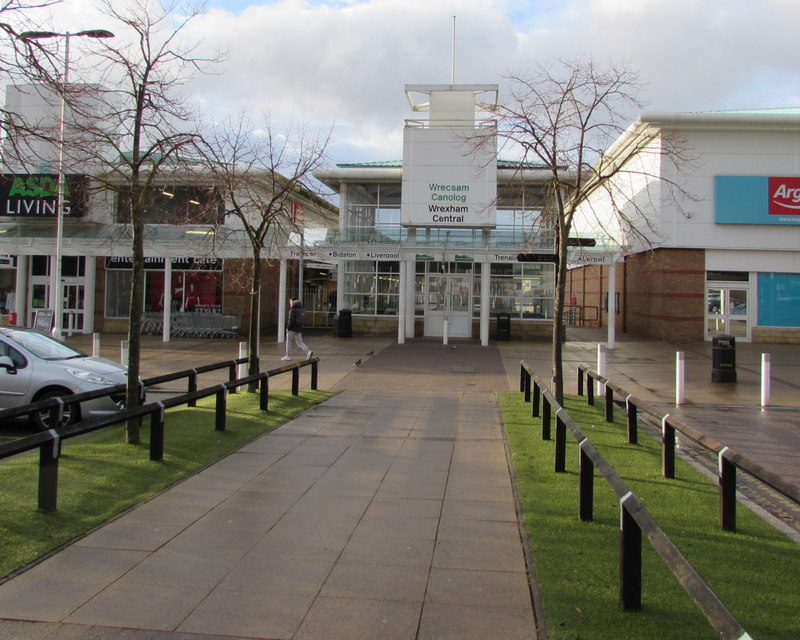
Pathway to 1999 iteration of Wrexham Central railway station, within the retail park, situated between two retail stores

The retail park was built on the site of the original Wrexham Central railway station, and the former Island Green Brewery. The park was developed by Trinity Investments, with construction stating in 1998 and it opened in mid 1999. The original site of Wrexham Central was roughly 50 metres (160 ft) to the east.

The retail park covers 140,000 square feet (13,000 m^{2}), offering 495–518 car parking spaces. Some of the retail park's occupiers, as of 2023, include Asda Living, Costa Coffee, the Food Warehouse, Next, Poundland, Smyths and Wilko. It was estimated the retail park received 9 million visitors by foot per year by 2018. The car park is privately run by Euro Car Parks.

In 2016, a redevelopment of part of the site was announced it would not go ahead. It would have demolished the nearby St Mark's Multi-storey Car Park, and included a potential new cinema.

In February 2024, the retail park was sold by Nuveen Real Estate to Focus Estate Fund. The most recent guide price at the time for the retail park was £12.5 million.

=== Past parking concerns ===
Concerns over paid parking ticket enforcement increased following the installation of automatic number-plate recognition cameras in the car park in December 2018. This led to visitors, such as those who were dropping off or picking-up passengers from Wrexham Central, a railway station adjacent to the car park, or those picking up pizza, being fined £90 for lack of payment. Following these fines, which first began being issued in March 2019, a group of campaigners against the fines planned a "peaceful protest" at the retail park in either July or August 2019, while others said they would boycott the retail park.

Signage stating to drivers there was now a 20-minute grace period for these drop-offs and collections were later installed. Although drivers had continued to complain over fines by the parking operator which they deemed questionable, or in some cases, "unfair" fines. Concerns over the car park's parking ticket machines being out of order or poorly maintained, leading to fines for those attempting to pay, and the impact it has on the retail businesses were also raised. While managing agent Savills backed the 20-minute grace period, some of those fined argued they were in for less than 20 minutes.

In December 2022, local MS Lesley Griffiths, stated she had written to the British Parking Association to look into the practices of Island Green's parking operator Euro Car Parks, in particular their conduct on fining drivers who had mistyped their vehicle registration. Businesses in the retail park say the parking issues are causing them to lose customers.

In March 2023, Griffiths stated that the parking situation "ha[d] improved". In February 2024, the retail park was purchased, with the car park's operator transferring from Euro Car Parks to Focus Estate Fund.

== See also ==
- Wrexham and Ellesmere Railway
- Border Breweries (Wrexham)
