= Fairy Road, Wrexham =

Road in Wrexham, Wales

Fairy Road
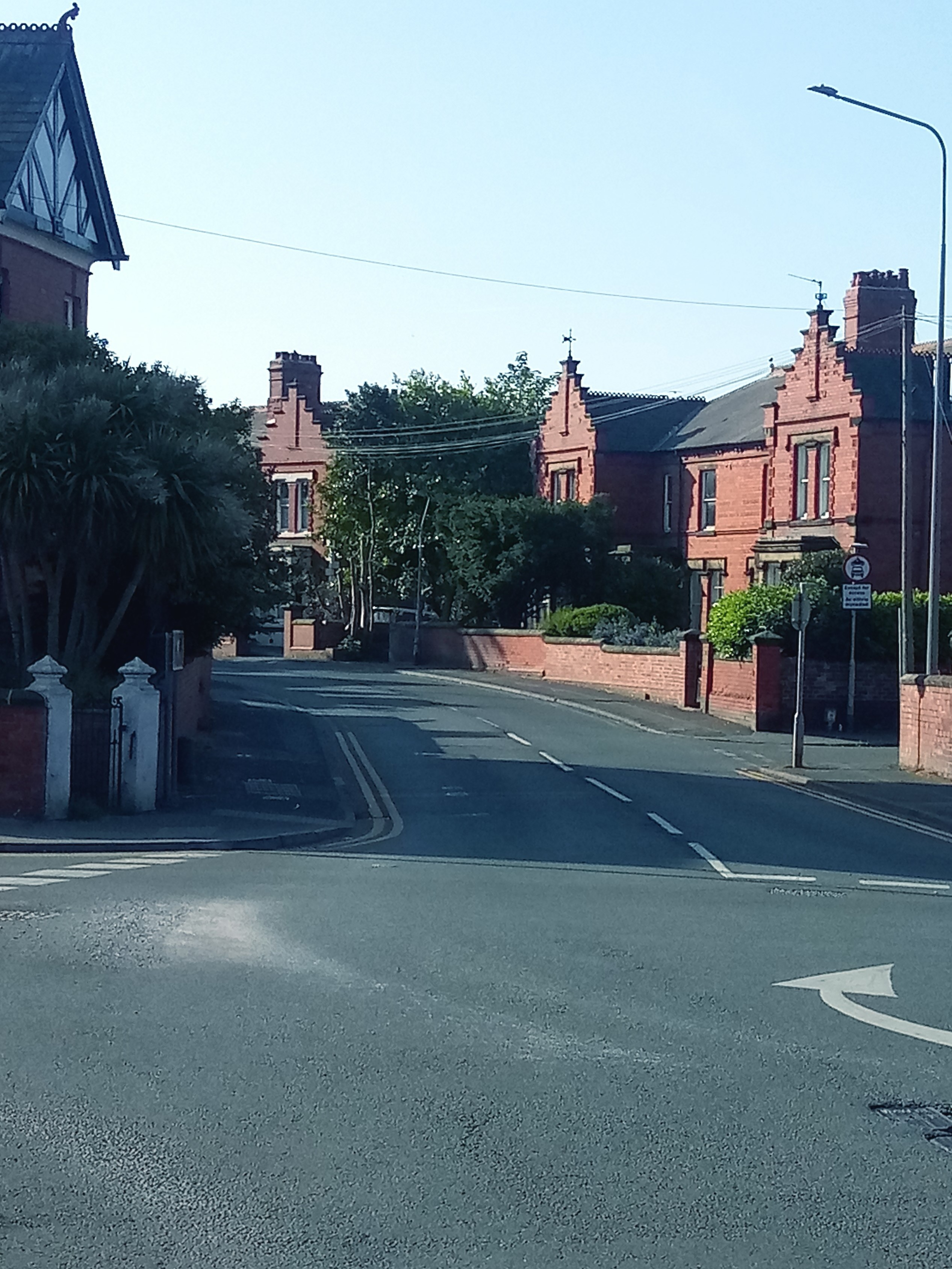
- Fairy Road from Ruabon Road and Victoria Road
- Native name: Ffordd y Tylwyth Teg (Welsh)
- Part of: Offa
- Location: Wrexham, Wales
- Coordinates: 53.03927°N 2.99883°W

Fairy Road (Welsh: Ffordd y Tylwyth Teg) is a road and conservation area in Wrexham, North Wales. The conservation has five Grade II listed buildings and one scheduled monument, the Fairy Oak Round Barrow.

== Geography ==
The Fairy Road Conservation Area is centred on Fairy Road and covers it and adjacent streets. It is located 1 mile (1.6 km) south of Wrexham city centre, and is almost connected to the Salisbury Park Conservation Area. It is designated as a conservation area due to the high quality of buildings present, in particular those in the Arts and Crafts style. The conservation area was designated in August 1975, while its boundaries were later altered in December 1997. An area assessment of the conservation area was adopted in February 1999.

The conservation area covers 13 hectares (32 acres), including Bath Road, Belgrave Road, Belmont Road, Fairy Road, Ruabon Road, Trevor Court and some parts of adjacent roads such as Court Road, Erddig Road, Hillbury Road, Sontley Road and Wellington Road.

Many of the villas within the conservation area are influenced by John Douglas, and Douglas' pupil E. A. Ould.

== History ==
The residential suburban area around Fairy Road dates to the mid to late-19th century.

Maps from 1872 show Bath Road, Erddig Road, Ruabon Road, Sontley Road and Wellington Road having been developed, while by 1914, Fairy Road and its Arts and Crafts style buildings were developed.

The area used to host offices of the Football Association of Wales, when it was located in Wrexham, until its move to Cardiff in 1985. The road gets its name from the Fairy Mount, a burial mound or barrow located in the gardens of No. 5.

== Listed buildings ==
=== Fairy Oak Round Barrow ===
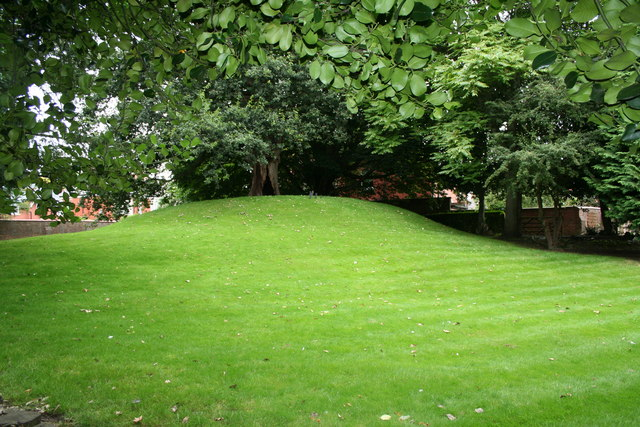
The Fairy Oak Round Barrow.

The Fairy Oak Round Barrow is the remains of a circular earthen-built round barrow, possibly from the Bronze Age. The barrow serves as an insight into prehistoric funerary and the period's ritual landscape, as well as archaeological potential. It is located in the gardens of No. 5 Fairy Mount. In 1881, before No. 5's construction, fragments of urn and bone were found, but have since been lost. The barrow was previously topped with an oak tree. A legend of the barrow is that on sacred occasions fairy folk would dance around it. It covers 0.05 hectares (0.12 acres).

=== No. 5 ===
No. 5 was built in 1881 by E. A. Ould, for W. E. Samuel, and is in the Arts and Crafts style. It is one of a pair of semi-detached houses, along with No. 7, on the north side of Fairy Road, close to the road's junction with Belmont Road. No. 5 was originally called Fairy Mount, referring to the burial mound which now lies in its garden. Its exterior is red brick, with a green slate roof. It is two storeys, with the raised lettering "Fairy Mount 1881" being present on top of its porch's segmentally arched entrance. Its interior is largely of its original design, with its central entrance and stair hall, principal rooms located on either side, and service rooms to the rear. Some internal decorations have also survived from their original design. The building was built on the field known as Fairy Field.

=== No. 7 ===
No. 7 was built in 1881 by E. A. Ould, for W. E. Samuel, and is in the Arts and Crafts style. It is one of a pair of semi-detached houses, along with No. 5, on the north side of Fairy Road, close to the road's junction with Belmont Road. Its exterior is red brick, with a green slate roof. It is two storeys, and its entrance faces east.

=== No. 9 ===
No. 9 (also known as Pendower House) was built in c. 1880, likely by E. A. Ould, for W. E. Samuel, and is in the Arts and Crafts style. It is located near Fairy Road's corner with Erddig Road, is in its own gardens, away from the road, and adjacent to Nos. 5 & 7. Its exterior is brick, roughcast render and rusticated stone, with a hipped slate roof. It is two storeys and its entrance is located to the rear of its side elevation.

=== Stafford House ===
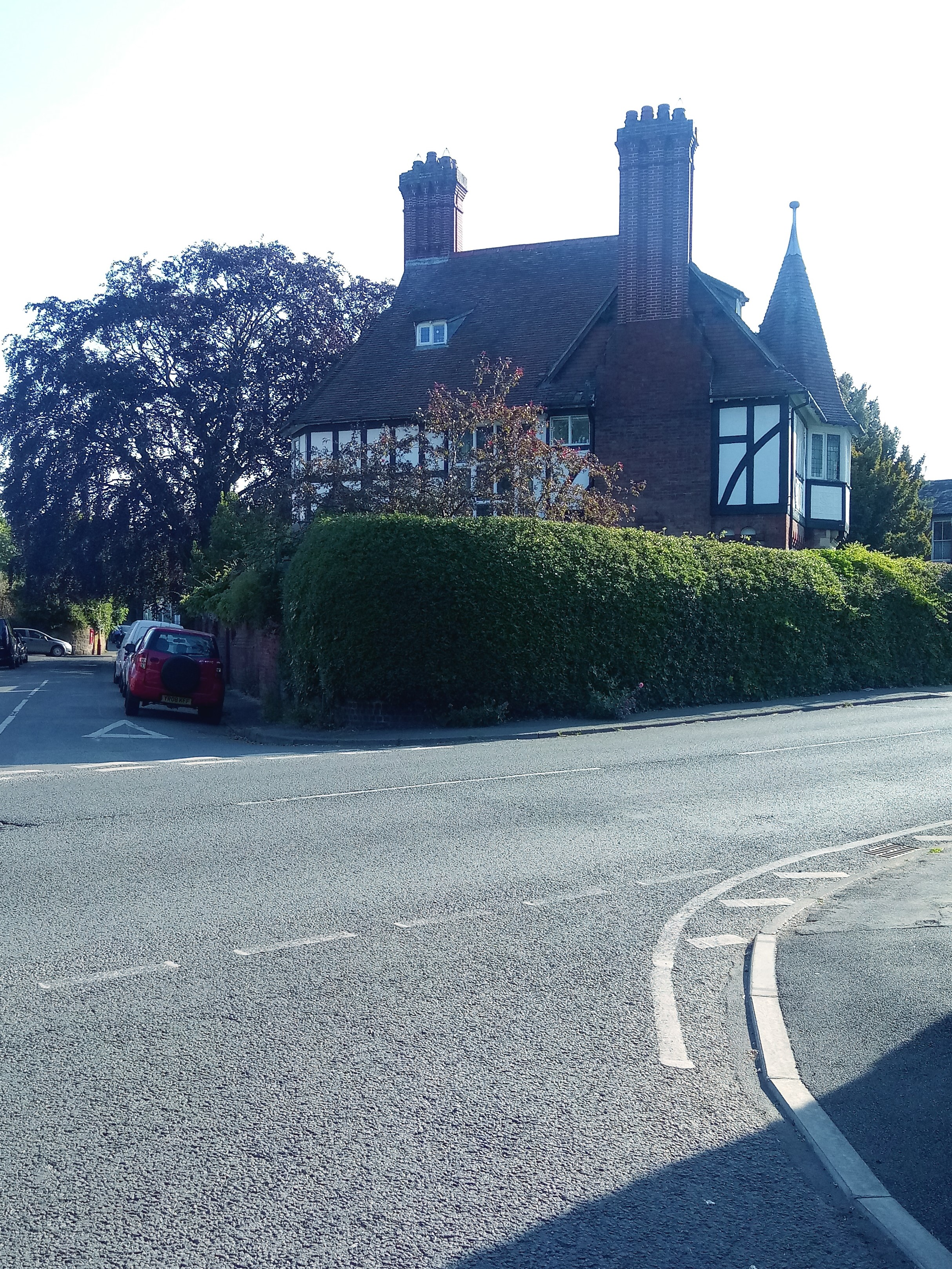
Stafford House from south-west.

Stafford House (No. 11) was built in 1876, likely designed by E. A. Ould, for W. E. Samuel, for Samuel's own use, and is in the Arts and Crafts style. It is located on its own grounds, forming a ringed "island"-type site surrounded by Erddig Road, Fairy Road and Sontley Road. Its exterior is brick, while its upper storey is half-timbered, and it has a red plain tiled roof. It is two storeys, arranged in an L-plan, with its entrance facing Fairy Road.

=== Nearby listed buildings ===
==== Bishops House ====
The Bishops House (Tŷ'r Esgob) was built in 1865 to the designs of local architect J. R. Gummow, and for Thomas Williams, in an Anglo-Italian style. Previously called Plas Tirion, the house was renamed, as it now serves as the residence of the Roman Catholic Bishop of Wrexham. The building is located on Sontley Road, near its junction with Belgrave Road, and is set away from the road within its own grounds. The building's exterior is brick, with stone dressings and a slate roof. It is two storeys and has a square plan, with a short rear service wing. Its interior retains its original plan, with a central top-list stair hall, an 18th-century style stair, and an entrance hall.
