= Rhosnesni High School =

Secondary school in Wrexham, Wales

- Ysgol Rhosnesni
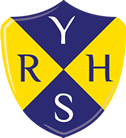

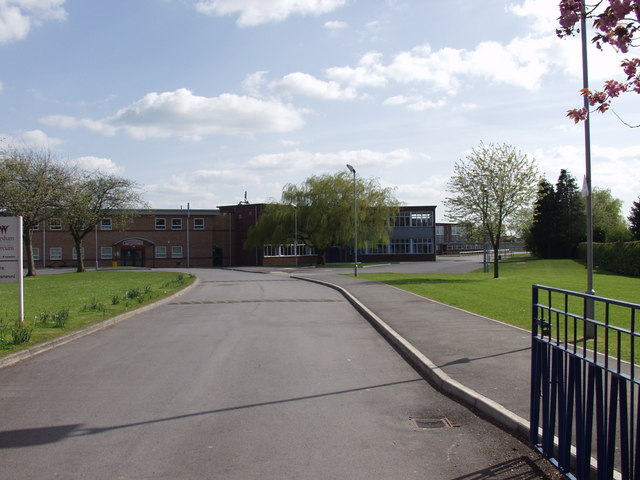
- Rhosnesni High School from the north on Rhosnesni Lane

Location
- Rhosnesni Lane; Wrexham, Wrexham County Borough, LL13 9ET; Wales
- 53°03′16″N 2°58′28″W

Information
- Other name: Ysgol Rhosnesni High School
- School type: Comprehensive school
- Motto: Respect, Honesty, Success
- Established: 2003
- Authority: Wrexham County Borough Council
- Director: Andrew Brant
- Enrollment: <1000
- Website: rhosnesni-high.wrexham.sch.uk

Rhosnesni High School, also known as Ysgol Rhosnesni High School or simply Ysgol Rhosnesni, is an English-medium mixed comprehensive secondary school in Rhosnesni, Wrexham, Wales. It was created in 2003 and maintained by Wrexham County Borough Council as a part of their controversial "super schools" plan.

== History ==
In 2002, plans were ratified by the Welsh Assembly to create two 'super' schools in Wrexham, with an emphasis on vocational education. Opposition to the plans was received from parents, and a petition of over 1000 signatures was delivered to the Wrexham County Council in April 2002. Nearby Yale College, which was to offset the some costs of the project by buying the Groves school and selling land, dropped out.

By late 2003 it became apparent that the original £12 million budget for upgrades would fall short by about £10 million because inflation was not accounted for in estimates. Nonetheless, the county council approved overspends allowing the schools to be upgraded as planned. Both of the new schools serve around 2500 pupils age 11 through to 16.

Three secondary schools were merged into two schools: Rhosnesni (formerly known as St. David's School), and Ysgol Clywedog (formerly known as Bryn Offa). The third school, Groves, was used as a temporary site for Rhosnesni, Ysgol Clywedog and another local school, St Joseph's Catholic High School, while improvements were made to their permanent sites. The Groves was shut down entirely in 2006 and remained unused until its partial demolition in 2013/'14. As of 2022, the oldest part of the Groves school building still stands, and proposals for demolishing the site faced local opposition.

In 2014, a report by Wrexham Council showed that there had been a big fall in admissions to Wrexham's super schools. The percentage of primary school pupils applying to Rhosnesni had fallen from 71% to 36%. Rhosnesni was one of 40 Welsh schools that was chosen to take part in a Welsh government scheme to improve standards.

In 2022, after Estyn’s inspection of the school in June 2022 they decided that the school made insufficient progress from their last core inspection in 2018. This led to Rhosnesni High entering special measures.

In 2023, after Estyn’s follow-up inspection of the school in March 2023 they decided that the school made sufficient progress from their last core inspection in 2022. This led to Rhosnesni High being removed out of special measures.
