= Croesnewydd =

Croesnewydd may refer to:

- Croes Newydd, former railway yard in Wrexham, Wales
- Croesnewydd Hall, hall in Wrexham, Wales
