= Border Breweries (Wrexham) =

Former Welsh brewery

- Industry: Brewing
- Founded: 1874
- Defunct: 1984
- Products: Beer
- Parent: Marston's plc

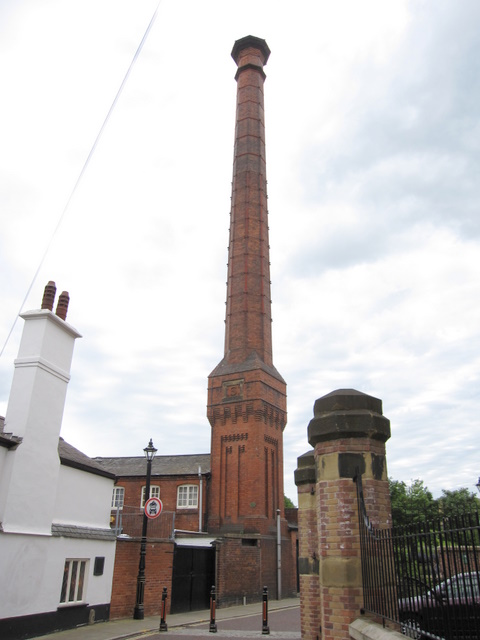
The Soames Brewery Chimney is still a significant landmark of the town.

Border Breweries (Wrexham) Ltd was a brewery in Wrexham, Wales, between 1874 and 1984.

== History ==
Border Breweries had its roots in a small operation at the Nag's Head public house in Wrexham, which was run by the Rowlands family between 1834 and 1874. It was subsequently acquired by Henry Aspinall - who named it the Wrexham Brewery and expanded it substantially - before being taken over by Arthur Soames, who entrusted his 21-year-old son Frederick with management. Within ten years, Frederick Soames had built up the business into a major producer.

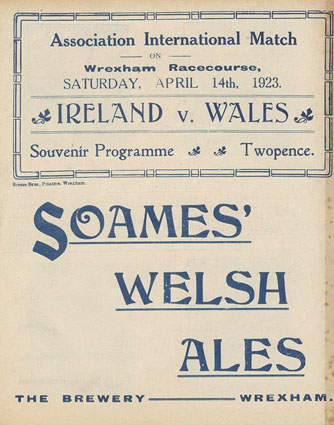
Like their successor company, Border, Soames Brewery was associated with local sporting events. 1920s football programme

Following the financial impact of the Great Depression, Border was formed by the 1931 merger of the Soames Wrexham Brewery, then in liquidation, the nearby Island Green Brewery (dating from 1856), and the Oswestry firm of Dorsett Owen. Operations were then concentrated at the Soames Brewery site. Along with the Wrexham Lager Brewery, the new firm dominated the brewing industry in the town, which was itself the centre of the industry in North Wales thanks to its supply of suitable spring water.

Border distributed a variety of products during its existence, including Border Mild (a dark mild ale), Exhibition Ale and its generally well-regarded Border Bitter (marketed with slogans such as "Wine of Wales", "Thirst Come Thirst Served", and "Prince of Ales"; the writer and humourist Miles Kington, whose father was the brewery's director, commented that Border had "managed to produce damned good beer but had never come up with a good slogan"). The bitter was described by journalist Richard Boston, writing in 1976, as "reddish in colour, pleasant in flavour, but rather thin". Border Bitter had an Original Gravity of 1034, and used Fuggles, Goldings and Whitbread Golding Variety (WGV) hops, while Border Mild had an OG of 1030. Border also bottled its own minerals. These products were sold in the firm's tied houses located throughout north and mid Wales, Shropshire, and parts of The Potteries.

Border's branding, in its later years, featured a pale blue and white colour scheme, a pseudo-Celtic font, and a stylised red Welsh dragon (a dragon had originally been used by the Island Green Brewery; Soames had used a bridled horse as its logo). The company had a prominent role in local event sponsorship: Wrexham F.C.'s Racecourse Ground, whose land was owned by the brewery, had a "Border Stand" for many years.

== Closure ==
As a regional brewery, Border Breweries finally fell victim to the increasing consolidation of the UK brewing industry during the 1980s. In 1984, two larger firms, Burtonwood Brewery and Marston Thompson and Evershed, sought to acquire Border and its 170 tied houses. Border's share price rose 43p to 155p in a day on 15 February, following rumours of a bid, and subsequently rose further to 208p. Marston's, thanks to the influence of Whitbread who owned a minority stake in both companies, eventually succeeded and despite public assurances to the contrary were to close the Border site within six months. They continued to produce Border products for some years under the Marston's name, though this has now ceased. Border Breweries (Wrexham) Ltd. still exists, as UK registered company 00257409, as part of Marston's.

== After closure ==
In 1985, some of Border's former staff went on to set up the small-scale Plassey Brewery at Eyton outside Wrexham, which still produces beer using Border recipes in some cases.

The partly listed Border premises in Tuttle Street, Wrexham have been converted into flats, while the adjacent Nag's Head, where the company had its origins, remains open as a pub. The brewery's chimney, a prominent Wrexham landmark, was purchased by the then local Member of Parliament John Marek to save it from demolition.
