= Croesnewydd Hall =

Country house in Wrexham, Wales

- Neuadd Croesnewydd (Welsh)
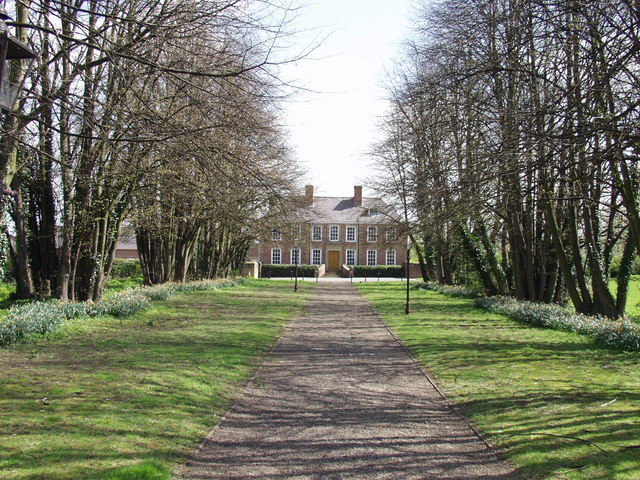
- Pathway to the hall

General information
- Type: Country house Offices
- Location: Wrexham Technology Park, Offa, Wrexham, Wales
- Coordinates: 53.0484°N 3.01417°W
- Current tenants: The Atrium Cafe; Offices
- Opened: 1696
- Renovated: c. 1985

Technical details
- Floor count: 2

Design and construction
- Architect(s): Peter Ellice (possibly)

Other information
- Number of restaurants: 1

Listed Building – Grade II*
- Official name: Croesnewydd Hall
- Designated: 9 June 1952; Amended 31 January 1994
- Reference no.: 1806

Croesnewydd Hall is a Grade II* listed building in Wrexham Technology Park, in the west of Wrexham, North Wales.

It was built in 1696 as a small mansion, with a farmhouse, possibly to the designs of Peter Ellice. It was purchased and renovated in the 1980s by Clwyd County Council into offices as part of the technology park to develop hi-tech services to assist the neighbouring medical institutions, such as Wrexham Maelor Hospital.

The brick building also houses a cafe in the adjoining glazed atrium.

== Description and history ==
Croesnewydd Hall is located in Wrexham Technology Park, within Offa, Wrexham. It serves as the centre-piece of the technology park. It is located next to Wrexham Maelor Hospital and other medical institutions such as a nerve centre.

It was built in 1696 as a small mansion and a farmhouse, replacing an earlier building. It was possibly designed by Peter Ellice, and was the second building built on the site. In c. 1985, it was extensively restored and extended. It was converted into offices, although also described as a "medical technology and business development centre" by Clwyd County Council, who had purchased the building, to develop a hi-tech sector assisting the neighbouring medical institutions.

In 2016, a private medical practice located in the building and run by Grosvenor Medical, introduced 3D/4D pregnancy scanning. The School of Medical and Health Sciences of Bangor University is also connected to the building.

The Servery is attached to the hall, and has catering facilities, such as a kitchen. It is situated within a fully glazed atrium, which links the main parts of the hall with the NHS Medical Institute. In 2019, a cafe known as "The Atrium Cafe" was established in this part of the building.

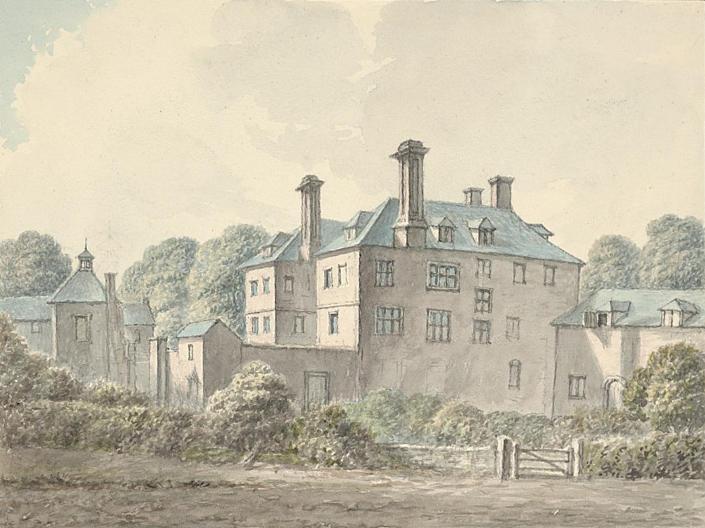
1796 watercolour painting of the building, by John Ingleby.

The building's exterior is made of brick, and the building is two-storeys high. It has a hipped slate roof, and internally has attics and a cellar (its attic could be classed as a third storey). The hall is arranged in a shallow U-plan, with its entrance facing the west, while its wings enclose a small courtyard to its east. It has side entrances.

The building is an early example of a brick building in "this part of North Wales".

The building's entrance hall covers a central range, and either side there are principal rooms.

The hall lends its name to the general area which may be also known as Croesnewydd, centred around Wrexham Maelor Hospital, as well as the former large steam locomotive, marshalling yard and railway junction within the area known by the derivative Croes Newydd.
