= Rhosnesni =

Area of Wrexham, Wales

Coordinates: 53.053°N 2.971°W

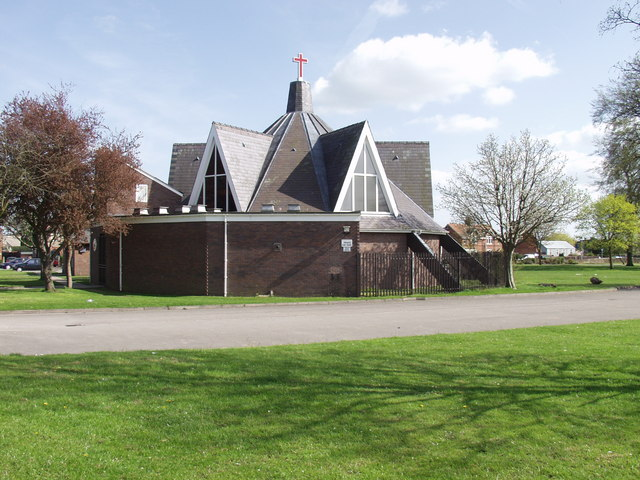
- St John's Church, Rhosnesni

- Location within Wrexham
- Population: 3,683 (2011)
- OS grid reference: SJ348511
- Community: Acton
- Principal area: Wrexham
- Country: Wales
- Sovereign state: United Kingdom
- Post town: WREXHAM
- Postcode district: LL13
- Dialling code: 01978
- Police: North Wales
- Fire: North Wales
- Ambulance: Welsh
- UK Parliament: Wrexham
- Senedd Cymru – Welsh Parliament: Wrexham

Rhosnesni (Welsh pronunciation) is an area and electoral ward in the community of Acton in Wrexham, Wrexham County Borough, Wales. The population of the ward at the 2011 census was 3,683. The settlement developed around the toll gate on Holt Road (the cottage of which still stands) and was expanded in the late 19th century by the addition of estate houses for the Acton Park estate. Following the breakup of the Acton estate in the 20th century much of the local land was bought up by private developers and Rhosnesni became an urban area.

Location of the Rhosnesni electoral ward in Wrexham County Borough, Wales

Rhosnesni High School is situated in the area.

1st Rhosnesni Scout Group and K2 Explorer Scout Unit meet in the Scout hut which dates from the 1920s.

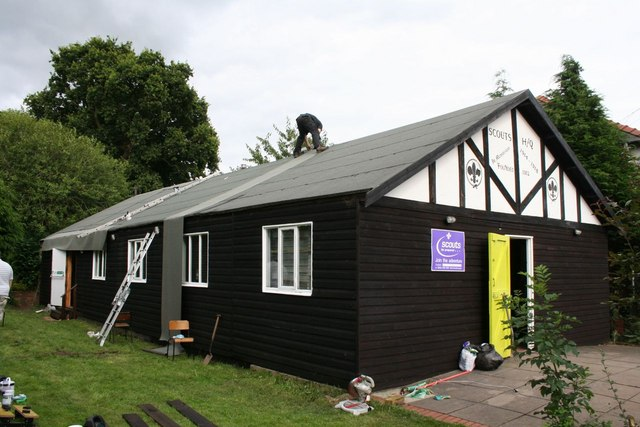
1st Rhosnesni Scout Hut
