= Ysgol Clywedog =

Comprehensive school in Wrexham, Wales

Location
- Wrexham, LL13 7UB; Wales; 53.0430°N 3.0114°W

Information
- Type: Comprehensive
- Motto: Being the best that we can be
- Established: 2003
- Head Teacher: Simon Ellis
- Gender: Both
- Age: 11 to 16
- Enrolment: 800
- Colours: Red, Yellow, Green, Blue & Navy
- Website: clywedog.co.uk

Ysgol Clywedog (Welsh for 'Clywedog School') is a comprehensive secondary school which serves parts of the city of Wrexham in north-east Wales, in the community of Offa.

Ysgol Clywedog is located in the south-west suburbs of Wrexham. The school was named after the nearby River Clywedog, in a competition open to the public, with the final name approved by governors of the school.

== History ==
In 2001, Wrexham County Borough Council decided to reorganise the secondary schools of Wrexham to solve the problem of surplus places and to update ageing infrastructure by merging the three city schools. The Groves High School, St Davids High School and Ysgol Bryn Offa were closed in July 2003. This was opposed by several staff, parents and pupils of all three schools, and a petition bearing more than 1000 names was made during 2002. The Welsh Assembly Government reinforced the local councils decision. In 2003 two new schools were established on the sites of St.Davids and Bryn Offa. In the same year work began on the new schools. The Groves site was used to house Rhosnesni High School in 2003/04 and Ysgol Clywedog in 2004/05 Both Ysgol Clywedog and Rhosnesni High School were dubbed "super" schools by the media and the local council and were designed to cater for 1200 pupils each.

== Performance ==
In March 2013 it was announced that the school had been put into special measures due to poor performance. The Estyn January 2013 report, said that the school was 'Unsatisfactory' in several areas, the worst of the four judgement grades that could be used By March 2015 the school was removed from special measures following significant improvements in exam results and the quality of teaching. The school achieved record exam results in 2014 and 2015. It was chosen as one of the 40 'Pathway to Success' participants in the Schools Challenge Cymru; a programme designed for schools anticipated to have the best potential to deliver swift and positive improvements for learners.
