= Horse and Jockey, Wrexham =

Historic pub in Wrexham, Wales

Horse & Jockey
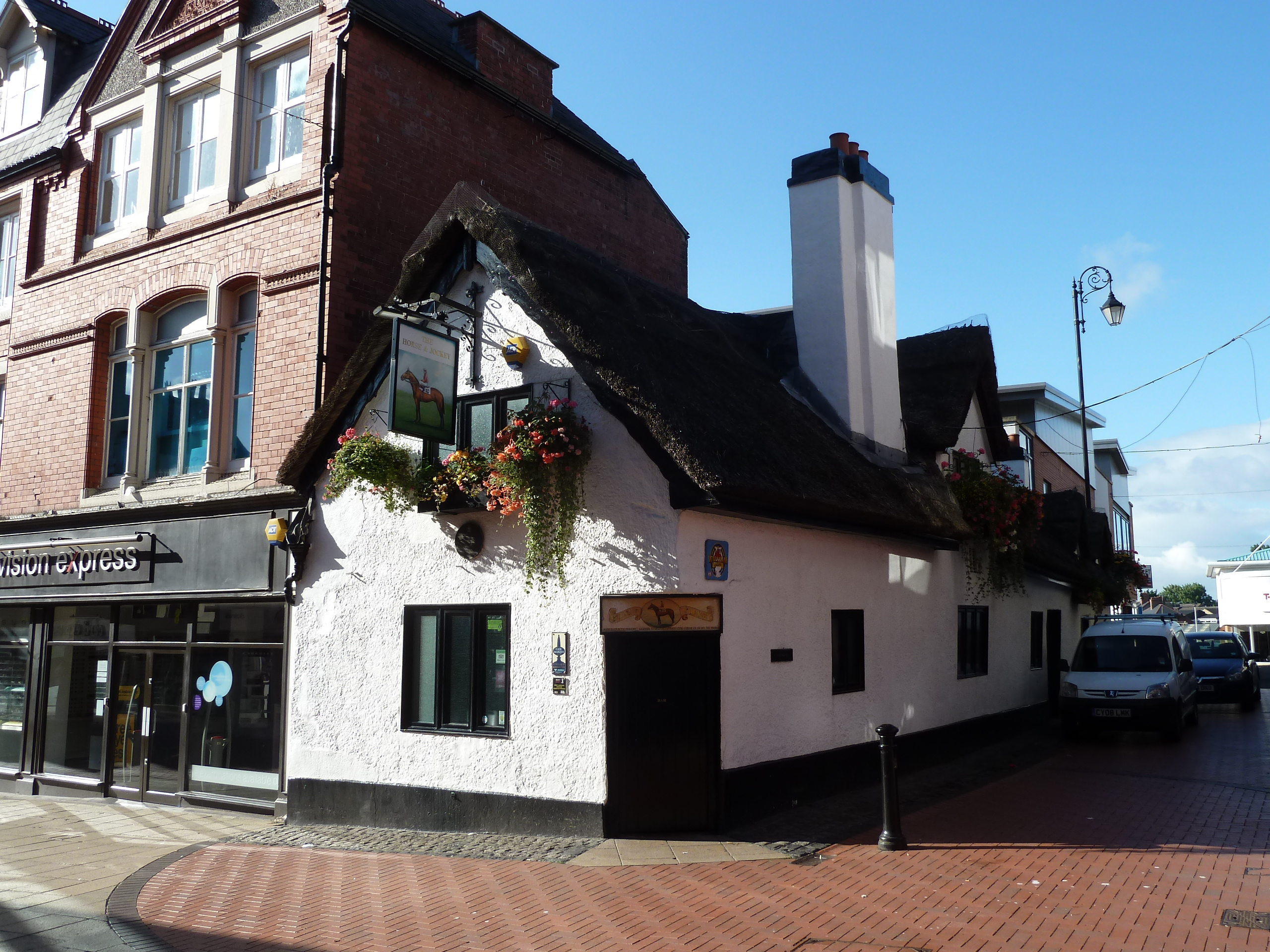
- The pub from Hope Street, with Priory Street to the right
- Former names: The Colliers (partly); Colliers Arms (partly)

General information
- Type: Residences (16th century–1868); Inn (200 yrs); Beerhouse (partly; 17th century); Private/guest house (partly; 17th century); Pub (1868–present)
- Location: Wrexham, Wales
- Coordinates: 53.046104°N 2.994949°W
- Named for: Fred Archer
- Opened: 16th century
- Owner: Star Pubs and Bars

Listed Building – Grade II
- Official name: Horse and Jockey Public House
- Designated: 30 May 1951; Amended 31 January 1994
- Reference no.: 1794

The Horse & Jockey is a historic pub in Wrexham city centre, North Wales, known for its 16th century thatched roof.

The Grade II listed building is the only surviving thatched roofed property in Wrexham. It was originally a 16th-century hall house, until it was later split into three cottages, one becoming a beerhouse — The Colliers — and another a private guest house, until they were merged into one pub in 1868.

It is posthumously named in respect for Fred Archer, a Cheltenham-born jockey who rode at nearby Bangor-on-Dee racecourse. The pub's sign is based on a painting of Archer.

== Description ==
The building had undergone multiple modifications for various different uses over centuries, glimpses of the original timber-frame construction of the building can still be viewed from the inside.

The building is largely brick, with surviving timber-framing, such as rear wall timber studs and on the southeast wall. It has a thatched roof, the only one left in Wrexham, while its gable faces Hope Street and its doorway on an angle between Hope Street and Priory Street.

== History ==
The building possibly dates to the 16th century as a hall house, a type of residence centred on a large room but contains no ceiling. The building may have been built with the intention for it to be a dwelling, and the hall house was composed of three units, a two-bay hall and storeyed end-bays.

In the 17th century, the building was extended south-westwards and sub-divided into three cottages. One of the cottages nearest to Hope Street was a private house, sometimes used as a guest house, while the cottage nearest to Priory Street (furthest away from Hope Street) was a beerhouse known as "The Colliers" (or "Colliers Arms"). In 1868, the buildings were said to have combined into a single pub, although the building is also said to have been "an inn for at least two hundred years". It is also "uncertain" when exactly the merger occurred, and whether as a pub as it was described as a "cottage" in 1893 by Alfred Neobard Palmer. Part of it was also a cobbler's shop.

When used as a public house, it was heavily remodelled in various successive iterations, with only fragments of the building's original form remaining.

The pub was renamed, in the late 19th century, as the "Horse and Jockey" following the death of Fred Archer (died 1886), a Cheltenham-born jockey who had ridden at the nearby Bangor-on-Dee racecourse. The picture on the pub's sign was painted in 1938, copying an original painting of Archer.

In 1938, the pub was sold by Beirne's Brewery to Wrexham Lager, which repaired the building to prevent its collapse, with the company obtaining a permit in 1939, during World War II, to protect the pub's thatched roof.

There are claims there is a ghost known as "George" present in the pub, with the landlord in 2013 claiming a spirit had once saved a cleaner from topping off a chair by grabbing hold of her leg while she was standing.

In September 2004, the building and its thatched roof narrowly avoided being caught on fire, as the neighbouring building, a furniture store, did. The pub was not seriously damaged as a result of the neighbouring fire.

As of 2024, it is owned by Star Pubs and Bars. In April 2024, the owners reported that the pub, which closed in February 2024, would remain closed until June 2024 as they look for a new licensee. It reopened in September 2024 following a refurbishment.
