= Salisbury Park Conservation Area =

Conservation area in Wrexham, Wales

Salisbury Park: Welsh: Parc Salisbury
- Conservation area
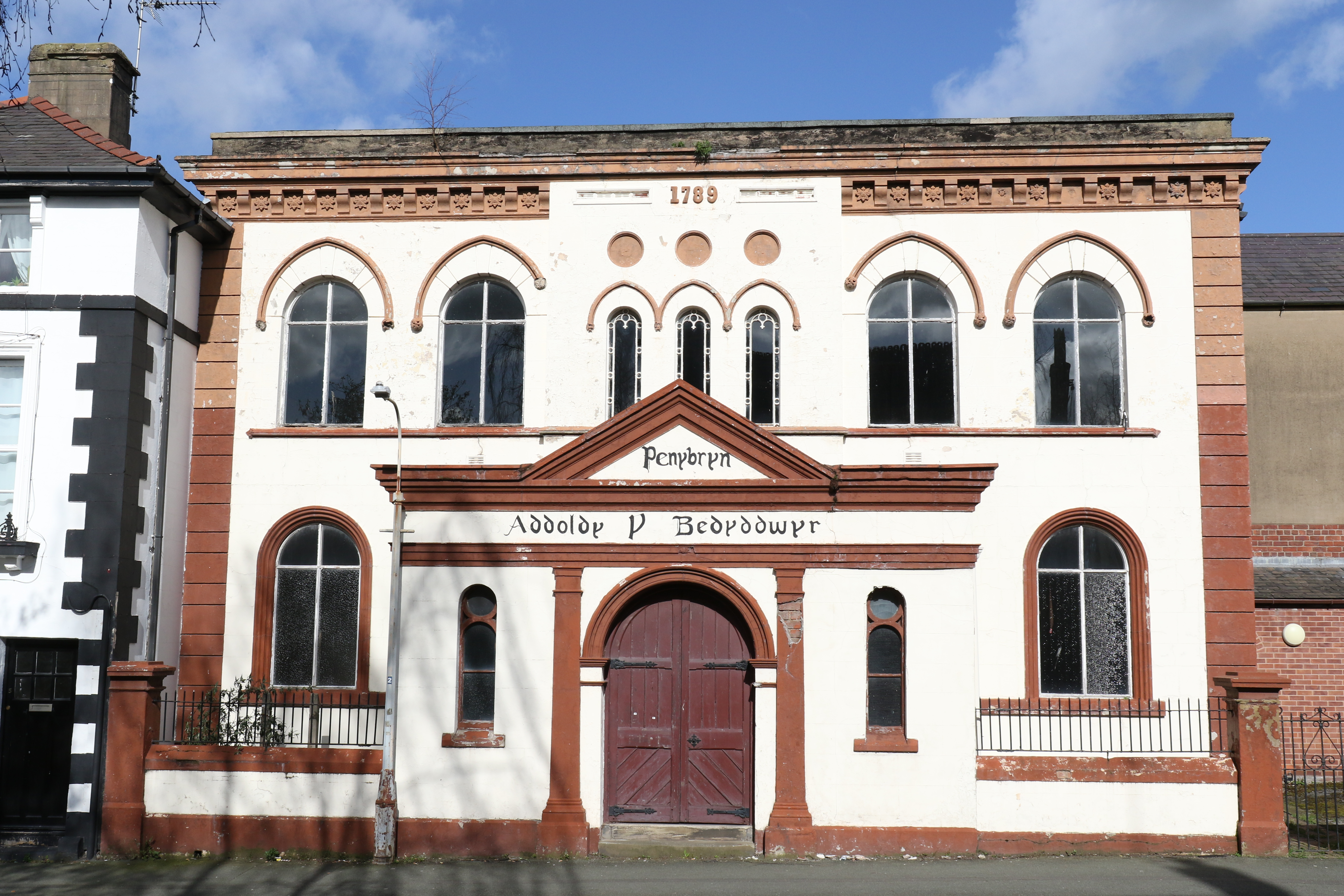
- Pen y Bryn Baptist Chapel, located on Chapel Street, in the west of Salisbury Park

- Location within Wrexham
- OS grid reference: SJ3338049850
- Principal area: Wrexham
- Preserved county: Clwyd
- Country: Wales
- Sovereign state: United Kingdom
- Post town: WREXHAM
- Postcode district: LL13
- Dialling code: 01978
- Police: North Wales
- Fire: North Wales
- Ambulance: Welsh
- UK Parliament: Wrexham
- Senedd Cymru – Welsh Parliament: Wrexham

Salisbury Park (Welsh: Parc Salisbury) is a conservation area in Wrexham, North Wales. Located to the south of Wrexham city centre, it is centred on Salisbury Road and Chapel Street, as well as other adjacent streets. It contains multiple listed buildings.

== Geography ==
The Salisbury Park Conservation Area (Welsh: Ardal Gadwraeth Parc Salisbury) covers areas to the south of Wrexham city centre, located on undulating terrain looking over the River Gwenfro and its parallel St Giles Way. The conservation area covers a largely linear area, between the junction in its east with Kingsmills Road and to Pen y Bryn in its north-west. This linear area is covered by the interconnected Chapel Street, Poplar Road, and Salisbury Road, forming the "spine" which makes up the conservation area. Other minor roads and streets link to the main "spine", particularly streets of Bryn Draw Terrace, Fairfield Road and Talbot Road, which are lined with terraces. In November 1996, the conservation area was designated for the first time, although in 2013 it was later extended to include parts of Earle Street. A character assessment and management plan for the conservation area was adopted by Wrexham council in April 2013.

The area now covered by the conservation area was incorporated as part of Wrexham, when the town grew outwards in the 18th to 20th centuries. This area previously served as agricultural farmland, however, no details of its former agricultural use remain. There are currently no archaeological finds within the conservation area, however, there may be potential on undeveloped land on Chapel Street, or the adjacent Pen y Bryn street, which is of medieval origin. The area today is mainly residential.

Architecturally, the conservation area is dominated by Victorian domestic architecture, and buildings made of Ruabon red brick, and Welsh slate as a roofing material. Yellow sandstone, sourced locally, is used as a material for Oteley House and the St Giles schools.

The conservation area is home to twelve grade II listed buildings. Beechley House is located at the most eastern part of the conservation area along Kingsmills Road, with the Edwardian-style Green Dragon pub nearby. In the conservation area's western end, there is a grouping of listed buildings, where Chapel Street joins Pen y Bryn. In this cluster are Pen y Bryn Chapel, 1 Chapel Street and 4 Chapel Street, with another pub the Albion Hotel located at the junction's corner. The remaining buildings located in the conservation area are not listed.

== History ==
In the 14–15th centuries, Wrexham was centred around St Giles' Church, with radial streets coming outwards of St Giles to the north, west and east. Most of the area was farmland, while Pen y Bryn, an adjacent street to the conservation area's northwest, dates to the medieval period, with some of its buildings possibly retaining some features of the period.

In the 17th and 18th centuries, many buildings in the area were constructed. This includes Beechley, No. 1 Chapel Street, the Pen y Bryn Baptist Chapel, and Poplar Cottage. The Pen y Bryn Baptist Chapel eventually gave the adjacent street its name. In the 18th century, Chapel Street, then called Street Draw, was potentially laid out at this time, to provide accommodation for Wrexham's increasing population as it expanded along the main route connecting Wrexham to Ruabon and Oswestry.

By the mid-19th century, streets were built in the modern-day conservation area, highlighting the spread of population into the area. In 1833, the area's main through-route was from Chapel Street to Poplar Road and then Madeira Hill, as Salisbury Road did not yet exist. Although a footpath followed where Salisbury Road now stands, with the path going towards Beechley House, and the nearby original Green Dragon building, located at the centre of Wrexham Fechan which is now Salop Road going into Hightown. Most of the buildings at the time were located along Chapel Street (then as Street Draw) and its junctions with Erddig Road and Pen y Bryn.

From the mid-19th century, Salisbury Road was developed, with it marked on maps in 1872 as Salisbury Park, which the conservation area is named after. The name Salisbury is derived from Colonel Salisbury, to who the land was inherited to in the 18th century from his family, the Thewells. Development of the road in the mid-19th century was mainly concentrated along the road's northern side, with large Victorian villas encased in their own grounds being constructed. While along Poplar Road and Fairfield Street, more modest residences were constructed.

From 1872 to the 1900s, the next major development in the area was the construction of St Giles School, situated on Poplar Road, and the Salisbury Park Congregational Chapel, which is located on the corner of Percy Road and Salisbury Road.

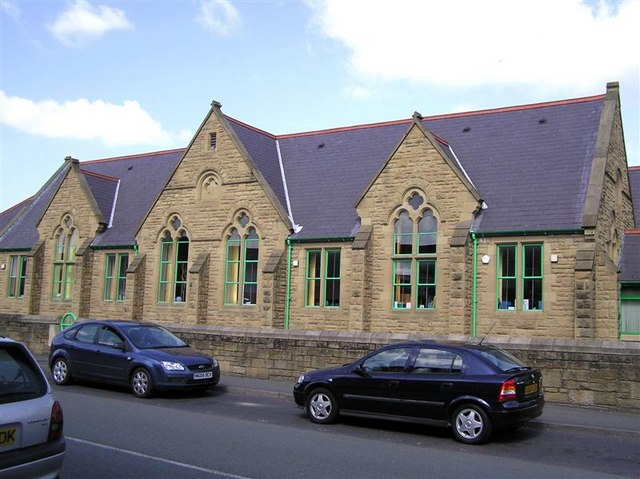
St Giles Infants School

The development of St Giles School occurred in two phases, depending on the growing educational needs of the growing population of Wrexham. The first school building to open was what is now St Giles Primary School, which opened in 1885 at a cost of £5,000. The funds were raised from an appeal organised by the vicar of Wrexham, David Howell. The school served as a replacement for the boys National school located in Wrexham's Beast Market. In 1895, the second school building was built in front of the first building. This second building is now the modern-day St Giles Infants school building but was built as a replacement for the girls' National school in Tenter's Square, located just east of the conservation area.

In 1898, the Salisbury Park Congregational Chapel was constructed near the junction of Madeira Hill, Poplar Road, Salisbury Road and Talbot Road. The building was however demolished in 1981, and described as "one of the [area's] most regretted losses" by Wrexham council. The site where it once stood is now occupied on its Salisbury Road side by Nos. 3, 5 and 7 Y Groes, and Church Court, and on its Percy Road side by Nos. 1 and 3, and the Salisbury Park United Reform Church.

Further residences were developed along Poplar Road, with Nos. 9, 11 and 13 terraces, which continue the terrace along Earle Street. Additionally, villas were constructed between 1872 and 1899, at Nos. 16 and 18 Salisbury Road, No. 51 Talbot Road, No. 27 Poplar Road and Nos. 6 and 8 Chapel Street. At the same time, Percy Road saw extensive development, while the road gets its name from the Dukes of Northumberland, the Percy family.

By the 20th century, the Cambrian Brewery was situated to Chapel Street's rear, an example of Wrexham's significant brewing industry at the time. In the early part of the 20th century, Salisbury Road's south side was developed with eight villas with Ruabon red brickwork, while infill development occurred on the road's north side. During the rest of the century, many historic buildings in the area were demolished, particularly at the Chapel Street, Erddig Road and Poplar Road junction which contained many short terraced buildings and a courtyard. This site of now demolished buildings was known as The Bonc, and now serves as playing fields for St Giles School. Other buildings demolished also included the Victorian terrace No. 1 to 4 Ar y Bryn, along Earle Street, with No. 3 reportedly the residence of Alfred Neobard Palmer, a local historian. Throughout the late 20th century, buildings were built on the areas of the demolished buildings in the Salisbury Park area, namely a Co-op store. Chapel Street and Poplar Road mainly have amenities and public services, while Salisbury Road remains primarily residential.

== Salisbury Road ==
Salisbury Road
- Native name: Ffordd Salisbury (Welsh)
- Part of: Salisbury Park Conservation Area, Offa
- Location: Wrexham, Wales
- Coordinates: 53.040924°N 2.992307°W

Salisbury Road (Welsh: Ffordd Salisbury) was developed in the mid-19th century, with the area marked on maps as Salisbury Park by 1872. The road's northern side was first developed, followed by its southern side. The name Salisbury is derived from Colonel Salisbury, who inherited the land in the 18th century from his family, the Thewells. The road is largely residential.

=== Listed Buildings ===
==== Oteley House ====
Oteley House, now known as Bradbury House, is a Grade II listed building situated on the junction between Salisbury Road and Salop Road, in Wrexham, North Wales. It is prominently located on high ground and within its own grounds. The building served as a residence but is now used as a convent and is dated to 1867. The building is a Victorian villa and is in the Gothic architectural style. Its exterior is of coursed and squared stone, specifically yellow sandstone, and it has a slate roof. Its interior is still of its original plan and contains its original encaustic tiling on its top-lit entrance and stair hall. The building was likely designed by local architect J.R. Gummow, who then lived in the building. It was home to William Sissons, the Cambrian Brewery owner, from 1881, and later between 1958 and 1998 it was home to a convent. Shortly after, the building was converted from a residence into offices, and its name changed from Oteley House to Bradbury House, with the building home to the charities Chariotts and Dynamic.

==== Beechley ====
Beechley is a Grade II listed building in Wrexham, North Wales. Located at 2 Kingsmills Road, it is located within Salisbury Park, and adjacent to Bennion's Road which is adjacent to Salisbury Road. It now houses multiple apartments.

It was built in 1720, and at the time it had no specific name of its own, although was called "Dursley's" or "Darsley's" for some years. It was described by local historian Alfred Neobard Palmer as "new" by 1726, with the frontage range of the building appearing to date to roughly the same period, with an interior remodelling likely dating to the same time. While the building's parallel rear range is a later addition, dating to c. 1830. The two-storey building's exterior is a rendering over brick, and it has a slate roof.

The house and its surrounding land was owned by Thomas Jones, and described in rate books from 1726 as the "New House". By 1747, the house was occupied by George Ravenscroft, and was later bought in c. 1749 by Denbighshire High Sheriff, William Jones. By 1780, while the Jones' were still the landlords, John Bell occupied the house until his death in 1781, and various other tenants thereafter.

In c. 1784, Beechley was bought by Thomas Bennion, whose family resided in the house until the mid-19th century. The family also owned land around the house, with a road "Bennion's Lane" (now Bennion's Road) being named after them. From 1871, the house was occupied by a John Lewis and his family. It was burgled in 1880, with the suspects being two deserting soldiers from Wrexham Depot. In 1901, the house was occupied by Francis Hawkins for six years, afterwards it was occupied by military men connected to nearby Hightown Barracks. By 1939, it was owned by the Mackreth family, then as a base for American G.Is in c. 1943, and then converted into apartments afterwards.

==== No. 1, No. 3 and No. 5 ====
No. 1, No. 3 and No. 5 form a terrace of three mid-19th century Italianate villas, that at Grade II listed, on the corner of Salisbury Road and Madeira Hill in Wrexham, North Wales. No. 1 and No. 5 form the ends of the terrace, with No. 3 being the centre. Its exterior is stucco over brick and has a slate roof. The two-storey building is symmetrically planned, with the entrance to No. 1 and No. 5 are set back and both beneath a tower.

Its boundary walls and gate piers, which extend across the front of No. 1 to No. 5 along Salisbury Road, are also Grade II listed. They are of roughly coursed rubble, organised into large blocks, while the gate piers are made of ashlar. They are designed as an integral part of the terrace and date to the mid-19th century, likely constructed the 1850s.

There is a coach house to the rear of No. 3.

==== Poplar House ====
Poplar House is adjacent to Salisbury Road, close to the junction of Madeira Hill and Poplar Road, and within Salisbury Park. It is an early 19th-century detached house and a Grade II listed building. It is stated by local historian Alfred Neobard Palmer, to have been built between 1817 and 1824, and was originally known as Poplar Cottage, consisting of two dwellings. Its exterior is of flemish-bond brick, with a rear wall made of rubble, and it has a slate roof. It is three-storeys tall, and a brick rear wing on the building was added later after initial construction. It is in the open ground of the adjoining St. Giles School. It is of the late Georgian style. By the late 20th century the building became vacant, and by the 1980s was in a poor condition. As a result, it was threatened with demolition, however it survived demolition and was instead renovated.

=== Former buildings ===
In 1898, the Salisbury Park Congregational Chapel, and its attached school room, were built, to the designs of Ingall & Son of Birmingham. It was located near the junction of Madeira Hill, Poplar Road, Salisbury Road and Talbot Road. Its most prominent feature was its octagonal corner tower and spirelet, made of Ruabon red brick. The building was however demolished in 1981, and described as "one of the [area's] most regretted losses" by Wrexham council. The site now houses residences and the Salisbury Park United Reform Church.

== Chapel Street ==
Chapel Street
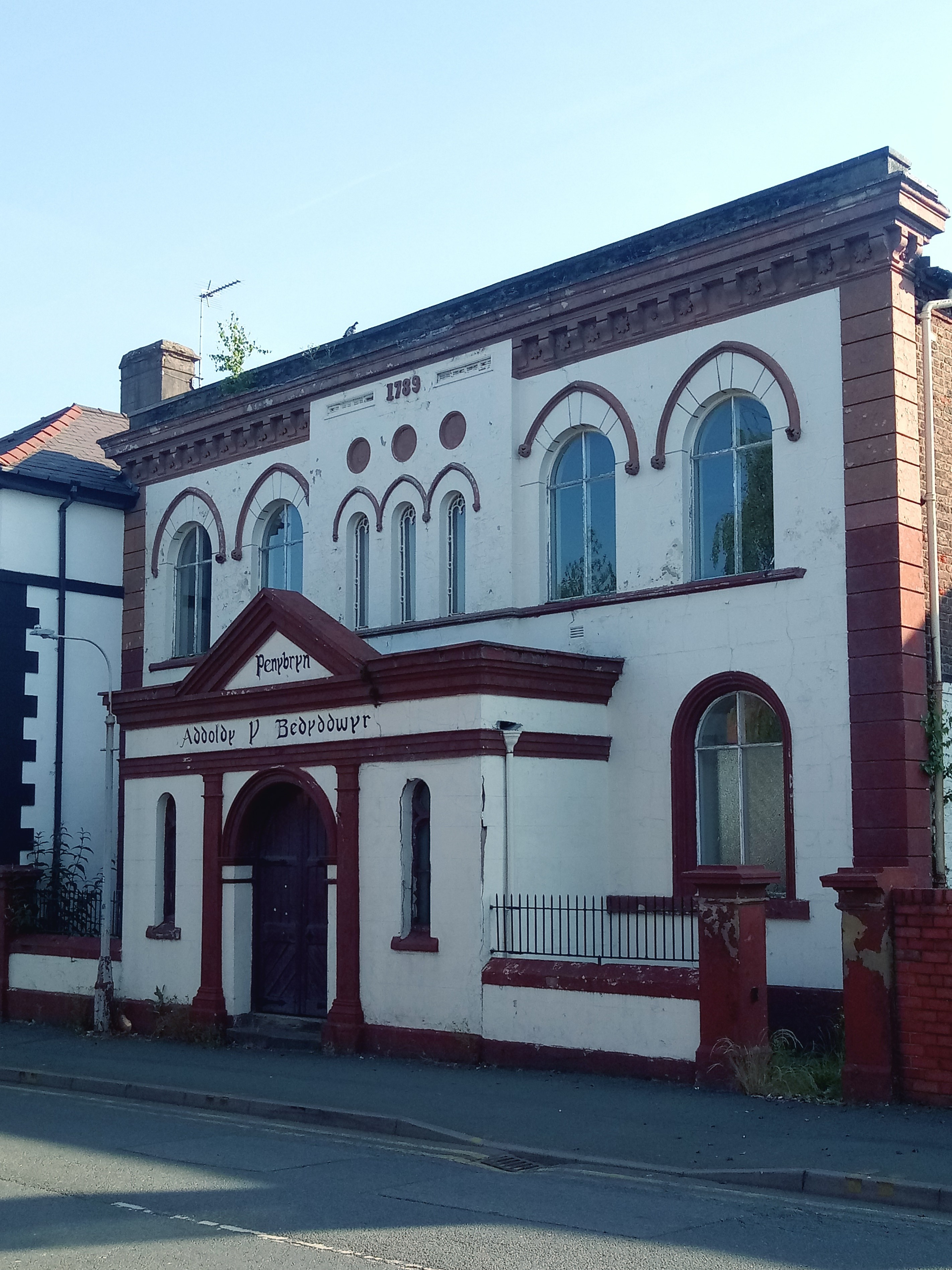
- Pen y Bryn Chapel on Chapel Street
- Native name: Stryt y Capel (Welsh)
- Part of: Salisbury Park Conservation Area, Offa
- Location: Wrexham, Wales
- Coordinates: 53.042926°N 2.995112°W

Chapel Street (Welsh: Stryt y Capel), historically called Street Draw, is a street in Wrexham, North Wales. It was likely laid out in the 19th century, to provide accommodation for Wrexham's growing population as it expanded along the main route connecting Wrexham to Ruabon and Oswestry. The street houses amenities, namely a Doctor's surgery.

=== Listed buildings ===
==== No. 1 ====
No. 1 is a small vernacular house dating to the late 18th century. It is located on the corner of Bridge Street and Chapel Street, and set back within its own gardens. The house's exterior is of brick with a slate roof, and it is two storeys.

==== Pen-y-Bryn Baptist Chapel ====
The Pen-y-Bryn Baptist Chapel, opened as the Chapel Street English Congregational Chapel, is located on Chapel Street in Wrexham, North Wales. It was originally built as a Congregational (Independent) English Baptist Chapel in 1789, modified from 1816 to 1818, and was extensively remodelled in 1881, which most of its current appearance dates to. In 1881, at the time of a religious census, there was a recorded 240 people in attendance at the chapel, while 204 people were recorded in the 1904 religious census. It was built for the English Baptist congregation that broke from the congregation on Chester Street, and who had by then congregated in a house on Chapel Street, although the English Baptists vacated Pen-y-Bryn in 1898 following the construction of the nearby Salisbury Park Congregational Chapel (now the United Reformed Church). It was subsequently bought by a congregation of Welsh Baptists in the late 19th century, with the Welsh Baptists still using Pen-y-Bryn by 2013. Its exterior is stucco over brick, with a hipped slate roof. It is two-storeys and in a sub-Classical style. The chapel gave the adjacent Pen y Bryn street its name.

==== No. 4 ====
No. 4, originally Pen-y-bryn House, is located on Chapel Street, slightly away from the street, and adjacent to the Albion Public House. Dating to the early 19th century, it was formerly used as a residence it now serves as a doctor's surgery since 1897, under the name Plas-y-Bryn. Local historian Alfred Neobard Palmer, stated it was built in 1808. It was originally called Pen-y-bryn House, and previously had "substantial" gardens on both sides of Chapel Street, although the gardens were built over in the late 19th century. The building's exterior is brick, with a slate roof, and is two-storeys. Adjacent is a pharmacy and a cottage.
