= Soames Brewery Chimney =

Former brewery chimney in Wrexham, Wales

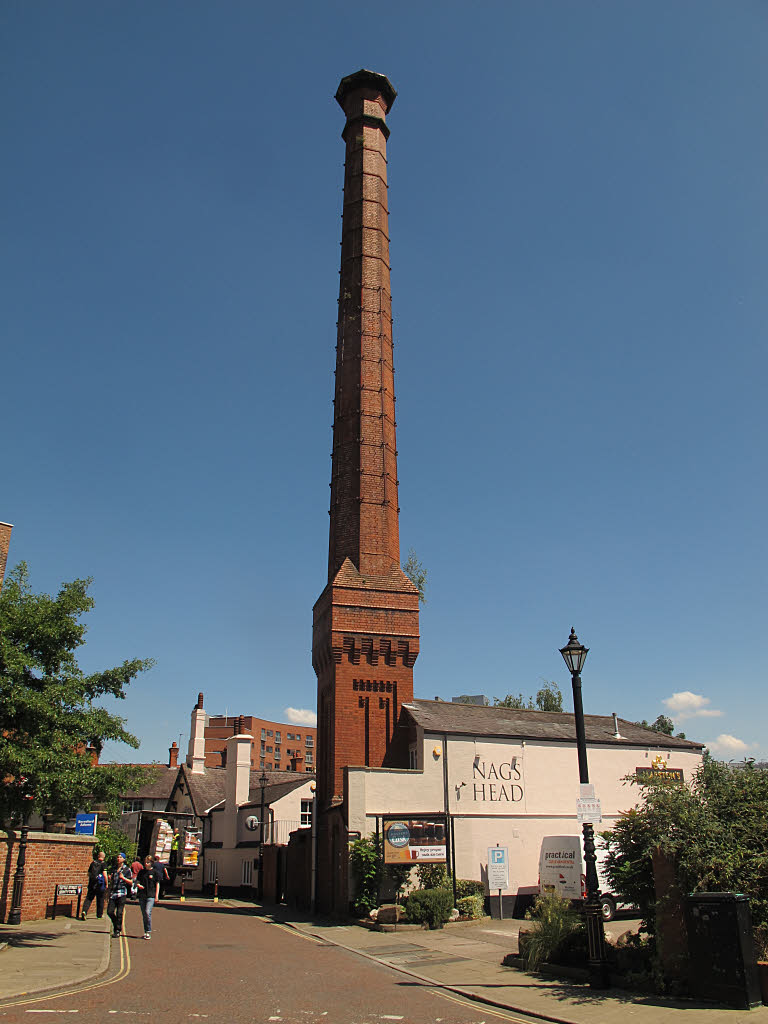
- The chimney from Tuttle Street, with the Nag's Head to the right.
- Alternative names: Border Brewery chimney

General information
- Architectural style: Red brick
- Address: Tuttle Street, Wrexham
- Country: Wales
- Coordinates: 53.043829°N 2.991764°W
- Completed: 1894
- Client: FW Soames & Co.
- Owner: Subair UK (2011–)
Past owners (1894–2011)
FW Soames & Co. (1894–1932)
Border Breweries (1932–1984)
Marston's Brewery (1984–1990s)
John Marek (1990s–2011)
- Height: 120 feet (37 m)

Listed Building – Grade II
- Official name: Former Border Brewery Chimney
- Designated: 31 January 1994
- Reference no.: 1819

The Soames Brewery Chimney is a Grade II listed former brewery chimney in Wrexham city centre, North Wales. It later became known as the Border Breweries Chimney, when the Soames Brewery was merged into Border Breweries in 1932.

The site, where the chimney now stands, was acquired by FW Soames & Co. Brewery in 1879, with the red brick chimney built in 1894. Ownership was transferred to Border Breweries in 1932, then Marston's Brewery purchased and closed the brewery in 1984. In the 1990s it was transferred to local MP John Marek to prevent its demolition, with Marek selling the chimney on eBay in 2011.

The chimney is regarded as a local landmark.

== Description and history ==
The red brick chimney is located behind The Nag's Head on Tuttle Street and is considered a Wrexham landmark. It is a visible companion to the nearby St Giles' Church which both can be seen from afar alongside each other. The chimney marks the site of one of the 19 former breweries located in Wrexham in the 1860s.

The red brick ornate chimney was built by the FW Soames & Co. brewery in 1894 and stands 120 feet (37 m) high. The brewery had acquired the site in 1879 while it was occupied by a smaller brewery which was associated with the neighbouring Nag's Head. It is a Grade II listed building, built with Ruabon brick and described as "the last of its type in Wales".

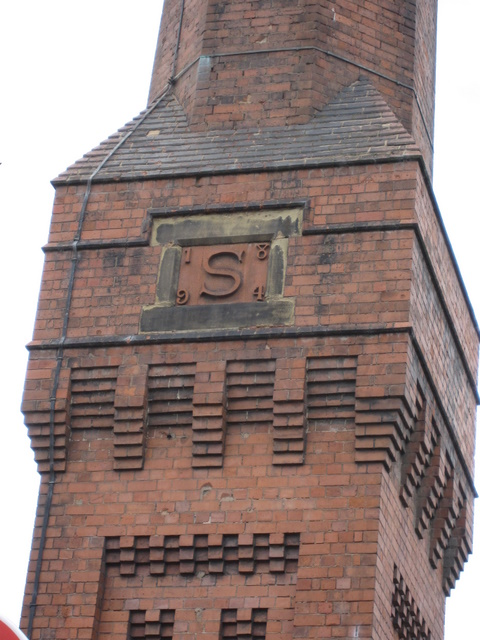
The engraved "S" for Soames on the structure.

The chimney is reinforced with wrought iron bands and has dated terracotta panels, engraved with the letter "S" denoting the Soames Brewery. These terracotta panels are incorporated into a corbelled chamber surmounting, on a high base with recessed panels. The chimney is highly ornamented, and this ornamentation is hypothesied to be a potential tribute to the owner's father who died in the same year as the chimney's construction in 1894. Below the panels is an octagonal shaft which terminates with a moulded projecting stone cornice and cap.

When the brewery (then merged into Border Breweries in 1932) closed in 1984 and was acquired by Marston's. The chimney was then threatened for demolition in 1990, however the local MP John Marek was keen to prevent its possible demolition. In response, the chairman of Marston's and Marek reached an agreement, where the chimney, alongside £2,000 for the chimney's maintenance, was transferred in ownership to Marek as the newly appointed custodian.

Marek stated in October 2011, that the chimney's insurance cost £700–800 annually, but it was in a good state of repair and showed no sign of problems following a survey.

Marek first attempted to sell the chimney through local appeals in a local newspaper in early 2011, and later sold the chimney in 2011 through an internet auction on eBay, with the proceeds going to charity. Marek had offered the chimney to Wrexham County Borough Council, but they refused, while a mountaineering group, who wanted to use the structure for training, could not get the needed insurance cover. Although following the sale, a dispute had emerged whether Marek had acquired the chimney in the first place, with Marston's unable to find the relevant paperwork on the transfer.

In the 2011 auction, the chimney was bought for £1,420 by Subair UK, a Saltney Ferry, Flintshire-based company who wanted to sell plaques on the brickwork on the chimney for the Help for Heroes charity.
