= Nags Head, Wrexham =

Historic pub in Wrexham, Wales

Nags Head
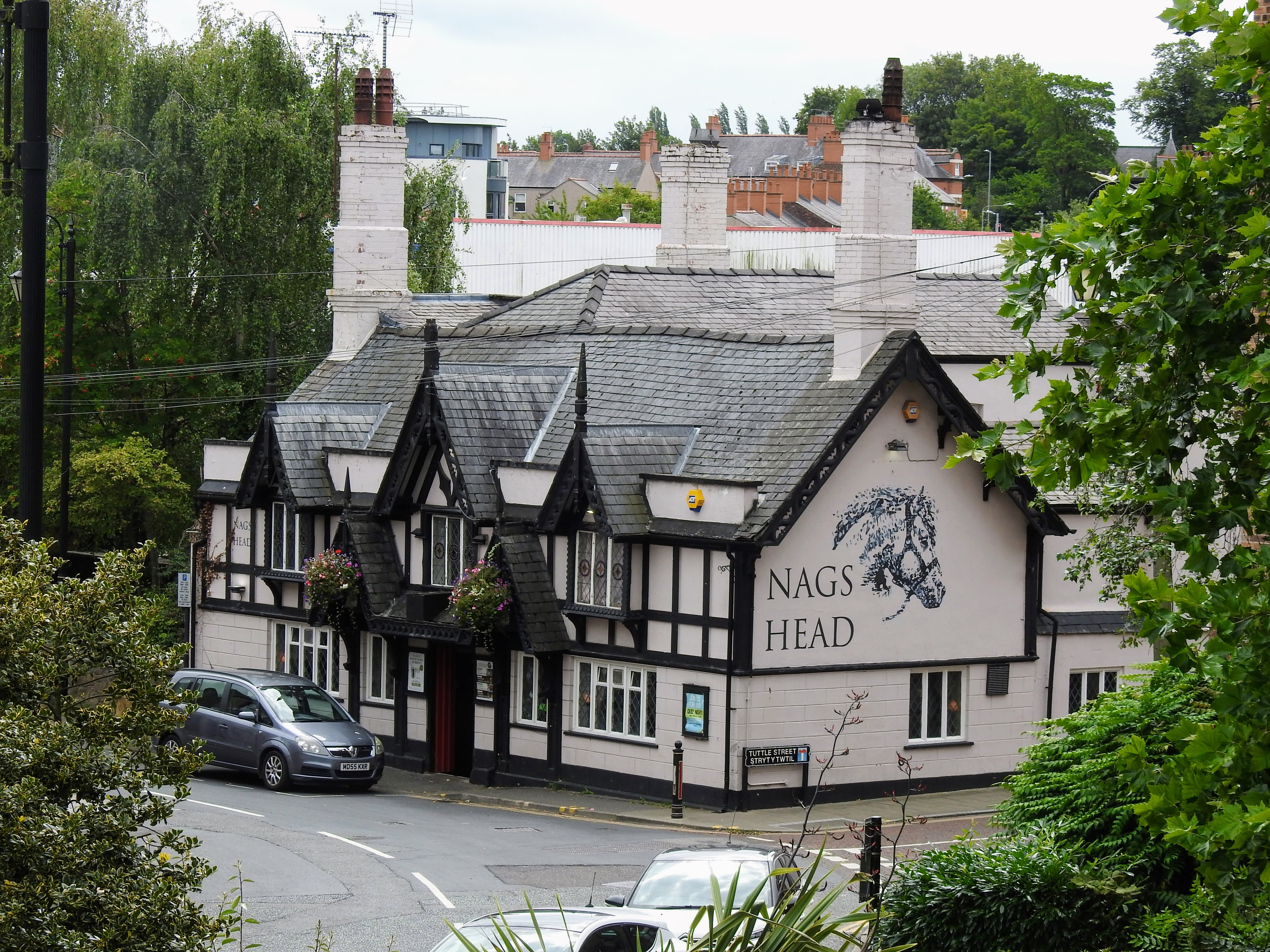
- The pub viewed from Yorke Street (lower left) and including Tuttle Street (centre-right)
- Alternative names: The Nag's Head

General information
- Type: Pub; Former brewery (1834–1984)
- Architectural style: Vernacular revival
- Location: Wrexham, North Wales
- Address: Mount Street, Wrexham, LL13 8DW
- Coordinates: 53.043931°N 2.991483°W
- Renovated: c. 1894
- Owner: Nag's Head Brewery (1834–1879); Soames Brewery (1879–1931); Border Breweries (1931–1984); Marston's Brewery (1984–)

Technical details
- Floor count: 2

Website
- nagsheadpubwrexham.co.uk

Listed Building – Grade II
- Official name: The Nags Head Public House
- Designated: 31 January 1994
- Reference no.: 1797

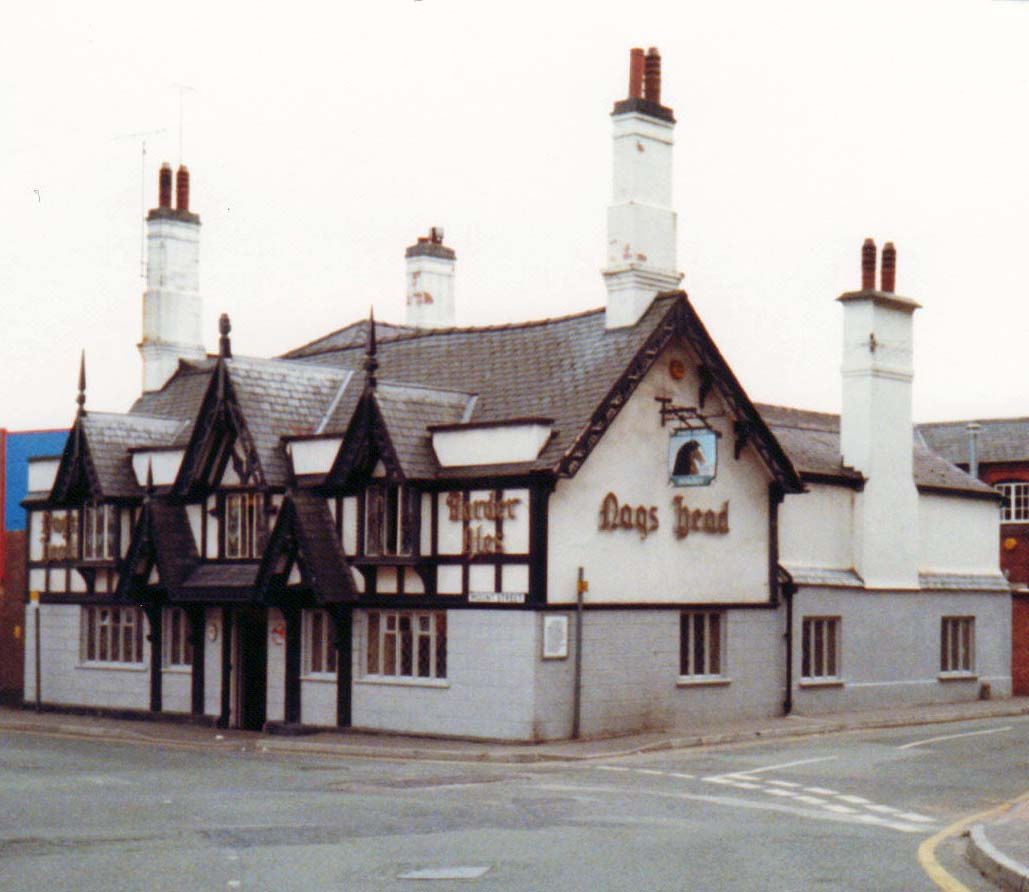
Older image of the pub.

The Nags Head (also spelled Nag's Head) is a historic pub on Mount Street in Wrexham city centre, North Wales. The current frontage dates to a 19th-century remodelling under the Soames family.

The Grade II listed building was also home to a brewery, known as the Nag's Head Brewery, which started brewing by 1834. The brewery and pub were purchased by Soames Brewery in 1879, who later remodelled the building and expanded the brewery in the adjacent area, including a brick chimney built to the building's rear. It became part of Border Breweries in 1931, and was acquired by Marston's Brewery in 1984, with the brewery closing six months later, while the British pub remains open as of 2023.

== Description ==
The pub is located on the junction of Mount Street and Tuttle Street, in Wrexham city centre, and specialises in British cuisine. It contains a beer garden and a car park.

The building has a fully surrounded central bar which served multiple drinking and dining areas. In the upper floors of the building lies a large function room which historically served as the Border Brewery boardroom, which now serves as a venue for private events, including regular monthly events. The building had historically brewed its own beer.

During its remodelling in the late 19th century, the building adopted a vernacular revival style although becoming less vigorous over time. A c. 1910 photograph is said to show the building being much more boldly enriched, with decorative framing, gothic-traced windows and an embattled parapet, than the building is today, with extra decoration said to be later removed.

The two-storey building's exterior is of lined out render to the ground floor, possible brick above. It has a slate roof, three-window range and a central entrance. The rear ranges to each side of the building was formerly part of Border Brewery.

The building was thought to house a pipe running from the brewery directly into the bar, although it is said to actually run to the bottling plant which was located behind the pub.

== History ==
A building on the site dates to 1661, and was originally the site for the "Nag's Head Brewery", which started a minor brewing operation in 1834. From 1834 to 1874, the brewers of the pub were William and Thomas Rowlands. In a newspaper advert in 1847, it was announced that "Rowland of the Nag's Head" had put up a wooded pavilion for the upcoming race days, in which he would sell his ale, with malt and hops, wines and spirits.

In the 19th century, some inquests were held at the inn, including an inquest of a three-year-old girl in January 1873.

It later became part of the premises of Soames Brewery being bought by Frederick W. Soames in 1879, who expanded the brewery into a major industry.

Under Soames ownership in c. 1894, the building's frontage was remodelled, although elements from the earlier structure were also likely incorporated during the remodelling. Soames also installed a new plant and increased cellarage.

A tall brick chimney, red-brick brew-house and office block was also built behind the pub in 1894, and serves as a modern-day relic of the Soames ownership. Soames Brewery merged with Island Green Brewery and Dorsett Owen (Oswestry) to form Border Breweries in 1931, who remained based at the site. The brewery and pub were bought by Marston's Brewery in 1984, with the brewery closed 6 months later and Marston's still operating the pub as of 2023.

In 2002, an oil painting of the pub by H.R. Chapman bought for £3,500 in an auction. A bidding clash occurred for the painting between an art collector and Wrexham Museum, with the collector outbidding the museum.

In 2021, the pub was described as the "best in Wrexham", following a public competition launched by local MP Sarah Atherton. In 2022, the pub raised over £1,000 for a local charity.

The Wrexham Folk & Acoustic Club is also based in the pub.

In July 2023, 33 cases of salmonella were connected to the pub, although the exact source of transmission was not identified. Following the outbreak Marston's deep cleaned the pub and tested staff to prevent any more infections.
