= Wrexham Maelor Hospital =

- Betsi Cadwaladr University Health Board
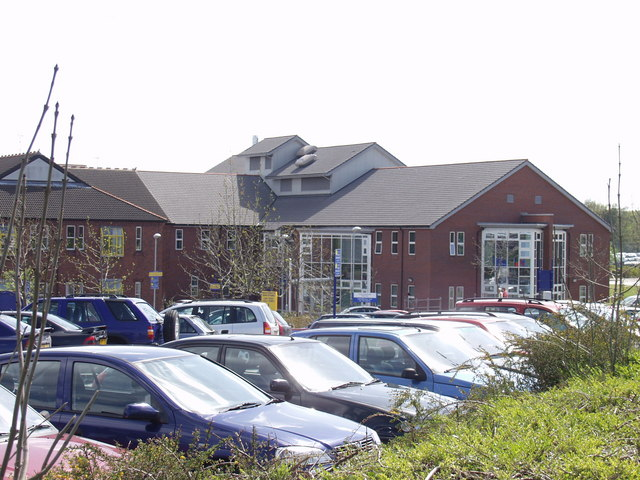
- Wrexham Maelor Hospital

- Shown in Wrexham County Borough

Geography
- Location: Wrexham, Wales
- Coordinates: 53.0467°N 3.0104°W

Organisation
- Care system: NHS
- Type: District General
- Affiliated university: Wrexham University; Bangor University

Services
- Emergency department: Yes
- Beds: 981

History
- Founded: 1934

Links
- Website: bcuhb.nhs.wales/patients-and-visitors/hospitals-and-health-centres/wrexham-maelor-hospital/

The Wrexham Maelor Hospital (Welsh: Ysbyty Maelor Wrecsam) is a district general hospital for the north east region of Wales. It is managed by Betsi Cadwaladr University Health Board.

== History ==
The hospital has its origins in the Wrexham Union Workhouse which was completed in 1838. In the late 19th century a large new infirmary was built to the west of the workhouse building and a fever hospital was created to the west of the infirmary.

A home for the elderly and infirm, intended to replace the workhouse, was opened on the site by David Lloyd George MP as "Plas Maelor" in 1934. (Maelor was a cantref of the Kingdom of Powys). The facility served as an emergency military hospital during the Second World War and then joined the National Health Service as Maelor General Hospital in 1948. The hospital was rebuilt using a nucleus layout and re-opened by the Duchess of Kent as the Wrexham Maelor Hospital in 1986.

In 1994 Maelor Hospital was widely criticised for sending a stillborn baby's body to Cardiff's University Hospital of Wales (UHW) in a cardboard box. The body should have undertaken the 200-mile journey by ambulance or funeral director but was instead given to a private courier firm to save costs. The body was carried in a plastic bag inside a plastic container, packed in a cardboard box, and was delivered along with medical supplies to UHW's stores. It was only discovered when the bottom of the cardboard box gave way and the plastic box fell out. Rhodri Morgan, then the MP for Cardiff West, said: "This is the most disgraceful incident in the health service in Wales during my seven years as an MP." John Marek, then the MP for Wrexham, wrote to Health Secretary Virginia Bottomley "urging her to issue instructions to ensure a similar incident did not occur again."

== Services ==
The hospital has 981 beds. It forms part of the North Wales trauma network, working in conjunction with the major trauma centres at the Royal Stoke University Hospital in Stoke-on-Trent for adult patients and Alder Hey Children's Hospital in Liverpool for paediatric patients.
