= Offa, Wrexham =

Community in Wrexham County Borough, Wales

Offa
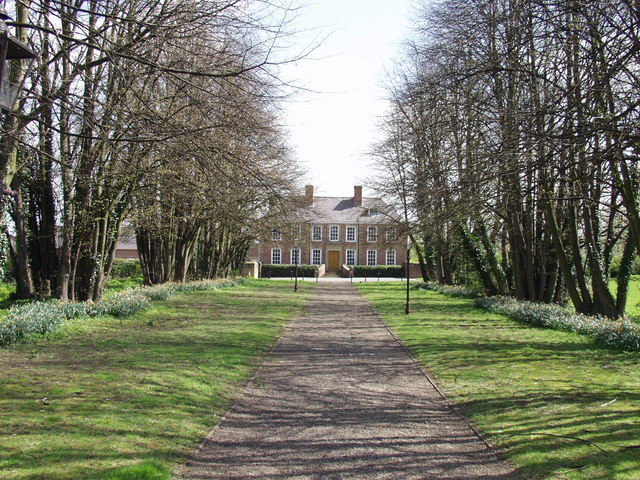
- Croesnewydd Hall near Wrexham Maelor Hospital

- Location within Wrexham
- Population: 10,501
- Principal area: Wrexham
- Preserved county: Clwyd
- Country: Wales
- Sovereign state: United Kingdom
- Post town: WREXHAM
- Postcode district: LL11, LL13, LL14
- Dialling code: 01978
- Police: North Wales
- Fire: North Wales
- Ambulance: Welsh
- UK Parliament: Wrexham
- Senedd Cymru – Welsh Parliament: Wrexham
- Website: https://www.offacommunitycouncil.gov.uk/
- List of places UK Wales Wrexham 53.04°N 3.005°W

Offa is a community and electoral ward in Wrexham County Borough, Wales, covering most of the south-western portion of the city of Wrexham. It is bordered by the communities of; Rhosddu, and Caia Park to the north, Abenbury to the east, Esclusham, and Marchwiel to the south, and Broughton, Coedpoeth, and Gwersyllt to the west.

== Naming ==
According to Howard Williams and Liam Delaney, a Professor of Archaeology and Doctoral Researcher respectively, at the University of Chester, the area is named after Bryn Offa (Welsh for Offa's Hill), a housing estate and former hall located currently within the community. Bryn Offa itself is actually named after Wat's Dyke which historically passes through the community, as historically there was no distinction between Wat's and Offa's Dyke, leading to local confusion. Williams and Delaney state that such distinction between the two dykes was only made by the nineteenth century at earliest.

== History ==
Unlike many such community areas in Wales, Offa was not based on the boundaries of an earlier civil parish or township, although it corresponds roughly to some of the areas included in the old township of Wrexham Abbott. It was first established only in April 1985, after a boundary review bought four new 'urban' communities into being within the then town of Wrexham. The community has four wards, Erddig, Brynyffynnon, Hermitage, and Offa. The Community Council states that it was noted in a Welsh Assembly report as one of the most "active and innovative" in Wales.

At the 2001 census, the community had a total population of 9,852 in 4,294 households, the population increasing to 10,501 at the 2011 census. Following the Hermitage ward's inclusion in the top 10% of the Welsh Index of Multiple Deprivation, Offa Community has been involved in the Welsh Assembly's Communities First regeneration programme.

== Area ==
Offa is bounded by the A483 dual carriageway to most of its west, stopping before Bersham, where it arbitrarily curves around until reaching the River Clywedog near Bersham Road. The river forms the community's southern boundary until its confluence with the River Dee which continues the border to the King's Mill. It then follows the A525 until reaching Eagles Meadow which via Mount Street it curves around reaching Wrexham's High Street, Regent Street, and the A541 until closing with the A483.

The community of Offa covers much of the south-western part of the city of Wrexham, including St. Giles' Church, Wrexham Central station, Wrexham Maelor Hospital, Wrexham Technology Park, and Bellevue Park. It covers large residential areas, including the areas known as Hightown, Brynyffynnon and Felin Puleston, as well as the part of the grounds of Erddig not within the neighbouring communities of Esclusham, and Marchwiel. Its easternmost sections are regarded to be part of Hightown.

== Gallery ==
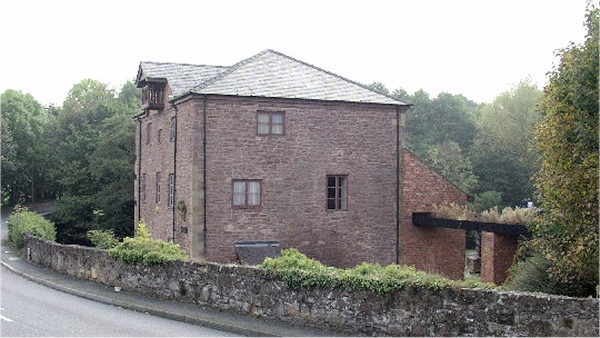
Former King's Mill Visitor Centre on the River Clywedog

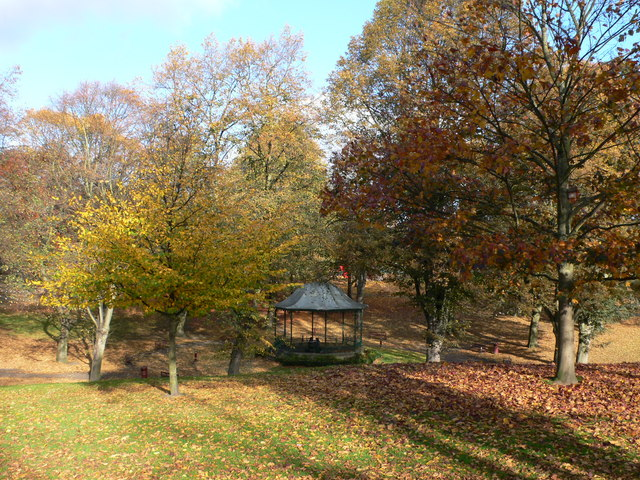
. The Bandstand at Bellevue Park
