= Feather (disambiguation) =

Feathers are epidermal growths which form an outer covering on birds and some dinosaurs.

Feather may also refer to:

== Arts, entertainment, and media ==
=== Films and television ===
- Feathers (1987 film), an Australian film
- Feathers (2021 film), an Egyptian film
- The Feather, a 1929 British romantic drama film
- "The Feather", an episode of Touched by an Angel
- "Feathers", a character from the 1959 film Rio Bravo
- Feathers McGraw, a character and the main antagonist in the Wallace & Gromit franchise

=== Literature ===
- Feathers (novel), a 2007 children's novel by Jacqueline Woodson
- Feathers (play), a play by Eliza Power
- Feathers: The Evolution of a Natural Miracle, a 2011 non-fiction book by conservation biologist Thor Hanson

=== Music ===
- Feather (step), a dance step in Foxtrot
- The Feather (award), an award within the Dutch music industry
- Feathers (American band), an electronic music band
- Feathers (Australian band), a four-piece band
- The Featherz, a Welsh/English alternative rock band
- Feather (musical artist), American electronic dance music producer
- Feathers a.k.a. Turquoise, a folk music/mime trio formed by David Bowie in late 1968
- Feather (album), a 2003 album by Misako Odani
- Feathers (Dead Meadow album), 2005
- Feathers, a Buckethead album
- "Feather" (song), a 2023 song by Sabrina Carpenter
- "Feather", a 2015 song by X Ambassadors from VHS
- "Feathers", a 2008 single by progressive rock band Coheed and Cambria

== Computing and technology ==
- Feather, an incision in diamonds affecting diamond clarity
- Feather, the NATO reporting name of the Yakovlev Yak-17 fighter aircraft
- Feather, the minimum drag position of a rowing oar or an aircraft propeller, see feathering
- Feather, a form-factor ( e.g. 50.8mm x 22.8mm ) for development-boards

== Other uses ==
- Feathered hair, a hairstyle which was a fashion in the 1970s
- Feathering (horse), properly called "feather" on some breeds, long hair growing over the lower leg and fetlocks of horses

== People with the surname ==
- Leonard Feather (1914–1994), jazz writer and producer
- Lorraine Feather (born 1948), lyricist/songwriter, and the daughter of Leonard Feather
- Vic Feather (1908–1976), former General Secretary of the Trade Union Congress in Great Britain, 1969–1973

== See also ==
- Feathering (disambiguation)
- Feathers Hotel (disambiguation)
