= Focus Wales =

Festival in Wrexham, Wales

FOCUS Wales International Showcase Festival
- Genre: Multi-genre showcase festival
- Frequency: annual
- Venue: multi-venue
- Locations: Wrexham, Wrexham County Borough
- Country: Wales
- Years active: 15
- Founded: 2011
- Founders: Andy Jones; Neal Thompson
- Previous event: 7–9 May 2026
- Next event: 6–8 May 2027
- Attendance: 15,000+
- Major events: Music performances, film screenings, conferences, and industry panels.
- Website: focuswales.com

Focus Wales (stylised as FOCUS Wales) is an international multi-venue showcase music and arts festival held annually in Wrexham, Wales. It is Wales' biggest music industry event and was first held in 2011. The event showcases emerging Welsh musical talent, as well as a selection of international emerging acts, film screenings, and conference events.

The most recent event was held from 7–9 May 2026.

== Description ==
The festival is held every year, with over 250 performances from various international acts. The event's organisers also attend and host conferences and showcases internationally, including far-away places such as Canada, South Korea and Taiwan to promote the event and its artists.

The event is Wales' biggest music industry event, and alongside performances, the event would host industry advice sessions, panels and keynote talks, with around 400 music industry professionals expected to have attended the 2022 event. HWB Cymraeg which provides Welsh language events at the festival was also present in 2022.

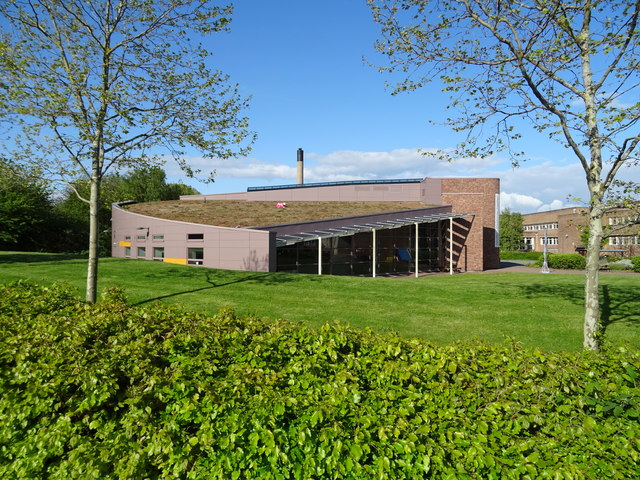
The Centre for the Creative Industries is a venue for the event.

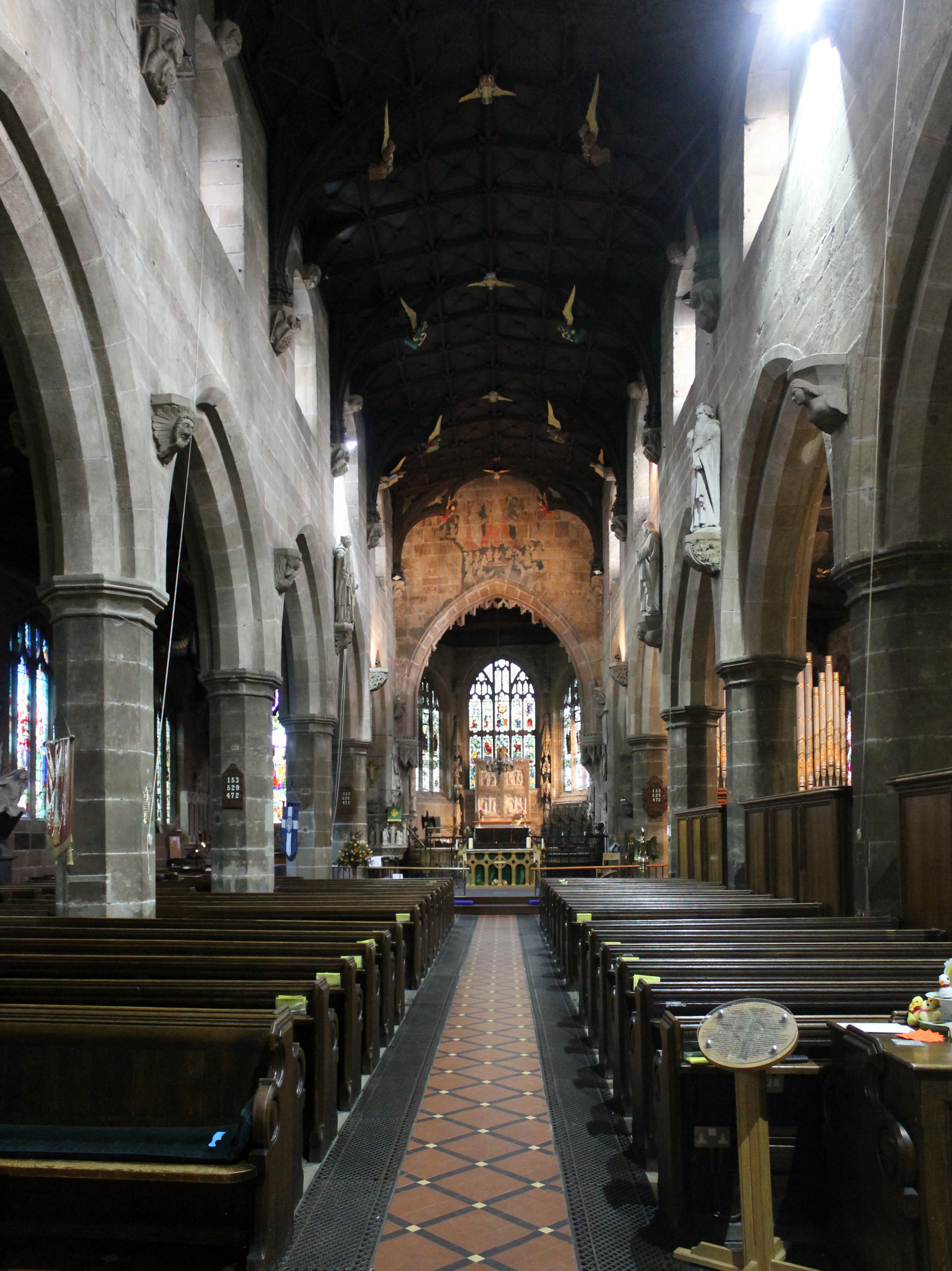
Interior of St Giles' Church where some performances are held.

In 2022, the venues for the event's 300 performances, were mainly concentrated in Wrexham city centre, including performances at Tŷ Pawb, St Giles' Church, Llwyn Isaf, the Centre for the Creative Industries at Wrexham Glyndŵr University, and the Hafod Theatre at Coleg Cambria's Yale Campus. Organisers of the event claimed in 2019 that it had contributed £500,000 to Wrexham's economy. The 2024 event also included various pubs, such as the Wynnstay Arms, Royal Oak, Magic Dragon Brewery Tap (in former Elephant and Castle) and Saith Seren, as well as restaurants and community centres.

Past performers at the event include: 9Bach, Snapped Ankles, Boy Azooga, Cate Le Bon, Tim Burgess, BC Camplight, Damo Suzuki (CAN), The Trials of Cato, Euros Childs, Charlotte Church, Gaz Coombes, Neck Deep, Stella Donnelly, The Lovely Eggs, Catrin Finch, The Joy Formidable, A Guy Called Gerald, Gwenno, Richard Hawley, This Is The Kit, Michael Rother (NEU! / Harmonia / Kraftwerk), Don Letts, The Membranes, Bo Ningen, The Magic Numbers, Kelly Lee Owens, Sea Power, Gruff Rhys, Kate Rusby, Georgia Ruth, Bill Ryder-Jones, Self Esteem, Stealing Sheep, Skindred, Bob Vylan, and Jane Weaver.

The 2023 and 2024 events were expected to welcome over 20,000 people to Wrexham, with over 250 artists at various venues throughout the city centre. Tŷ Pawb served as a main venue, and as the ticketing box office. The event since 2019 has been held across 20 stages. For the 2023 event, the Focus Wales Film Festival took place in Coleg Cambria's Theatr Iâl/Hafod Theatre on 5–6 May 2023, supported by Fflim Cymru and 73 Degree Films.

== History ==
It was launched in 2011 to create a spotlight event for the Welsh music industry.

For events from 2017 to 2019, the Welsh Government supported the event with funding. The 2017 event attracted 7,000 visitors, and aside Welsh and British acts also had acts from places such as Canada, Catalonia (Spain), France, Norway, Poland and South Korea.

The 2020 event was postponed to 2021 due to the COVID-19 pandemic in Wales.

In September 2021, the event was awarded Wrexham Civic recognition by Wrexham County Borough Council.

For the 2022 event, acts included Public Service Broadcasting, Echo & the Bunnymen, Gwenno, Self Esteem and around 250 other acts. At the UK Festival Awards, the festival was awarded the "Best Music Festival for Emerging Talent".

In March 2022, Focus Wales organised a showcase event at the Swan Dive, in Austin, Texas, to promote six artists from Wales.

In May 2022, the festival backed Wrexham County Borough's UK City of Culture 2025 bid, although it lost to Bradford.

In March 2023, the festival assisted in launching the Welsh Music Abroad initiative to promote Welsh music internationally.

In March 2026, Focus Wales organised a showcase event at the Swan Dive, in Austin, Texas, to promote five artists from Wales.

For the 2026 event, acts include Idlewild, Fat Dog, Gwenno, Shame, Vona Vella and around 250 other acts.
