= Yakovlev Yak-16 =

Twin-piston-engine Soviet airliner, 1947

General information
- Type: Light transport aircraft
- National origin: Soviet Union
- Manufacturer: Yakovlev
- Status: Canceled
- Number built: 2

History
- First flight: 24 September 1947

The Yakovlev Yak-16 (NATO reporting name Cork) was a Soviet light transport that first flew in 1947. Prototypes were built in both passenger and military cargo versions, but neither was put into production as the Antonov An-2 was felt to be more versatile.

== Development ==
After the end of World War II the GVF (Grazdahnskij Vozdushnyj Flot–Civil Air Fleet) issued a requirement for a passenger aircraft to service low-volume destinations too small to justify a Lisunov Li-2. It wanted an aircraft capable of carrying ten passengers over a distance of 800 km (500 mi) at a cruising speed of 290 km/h (180 mph) that would be powered by a pair of 700-horsepower (520 kW) Shvetsov ASh-21 radial engines. The Yakovlev OKB was tasked to fulfill this requirement in February 1946 with the first prototype ready for State acceptance trials on 1 November 1946. This proved to be too optimistic considering the amount of work the OKB was already doing and this was delayed to August 1947. The specification was revised at the same time to specify a speed no less than 350 km (220 mi) at sea level and that the military version was to mount a dorsal turret with a single 20 mm (0.79 in) gun.

The Yak-16 was a low-winged, twin-engined monoplane that closely resembled the Li-2. The metal-skinned, semi-monocoque fuselage had room for a two-person cockpit and ten passengers plus a toilet and baggage hold. The control surfaces of the tail were fabric-covered although the tail itself was metal-skinned. The two-spar metal wing was built in three sections, a rectangular center section and two trapezoidal outer panels. The main undercarriage legs retracted forward into the engine nacelles, with the wheels remaining semi-exposed, while the tailwheel was fixed. The ASh-21 engines had NACA cowlings and drove two-bladed variable-pitch VISh-11V-20 propellers.

The first prototype, often referred to as the Yak-16-I, made its first flight on 24 September 1947 and proved to have excellent handling characteristics with one engine out and could also climb with one engine inoperable. It passed its State acceptance trials in early 1948 at the NII GVF (Nauchno-Issledovatel'skiy Institut Grazhdanskogo Vozdushnogo Flota—Scientific Test Institute for Civil Air Fleet).

The military transport version, often called the Yak-16-II, differed from the passenger version as it carried a UTK-1 ball turret that mounted a 12.7 mm (0.50 in) Berezin UBT machine gun immediately behind the flight deck, the cargo cabin floor was reinforced, the vertical tail was slightly larger and the fuselage was slightly longer. It used three-bladed V-511 feathering propellers with scimitar-shaped blades. It could carry seven paratroopers, ten fully equipped troops or six stretcher cases and a medical attendant. It was fitted with a large clamshell door on the left side of the fuselage to facilitate cargo loading. This door had a smaller, inward-opening door set into its forward half. Three TsDMMM-120 supply containers could be fitted on racks underneath the wing center section and it was fitted with a glider tow hook.

The Yak-16-II passed its manufacturer's trials in April 1948 and was submitted for the State acceptance trials shortly afterwards. These revealed several deficiencies that caused the horizontal tail area to be increased and deicing equipment to be fitted on the leading edges of the wings and tail. It was resubmitted for another round of State acceptance trials which approved it for production. However, it was not selected for production as the Antonov An-2 was thought to be more versatile in both roles. Some effort was made to drum up export sales in Eastern Europe, but no interest was shown because it was not in service with Aeroflot. The prototypes were used for a time by the Yakovlev OKB and Factory No. 464 which had built them.

== Specifications (Yak-16-I) ==
Data from Gordon, et al., OKB Yakovlev: A History of the Design Bureau and its Aircraft

General characteristics

- Crew: two
- Capacity: ten
- Length: 15.6 m (51 ft 2 in)
- Wingspan: 21.5 m (70 ft 6 in)
- Height: 4.66 m (15 ft 3 in)
- Wing area: 56.25 m^{2} (605.5 sq ft)
- Empty weight: 4,486 kg (9,890 lb)
- Gross weight: 6,230 kg (13,735 lb)
- Fuel capacity: 1,600 litres (350 imp gal; 420 US gal)
- Powerplant: 2 × Shvetsov ASh-21 seven-cylinder, air-cooled, single-row, radial engines, 522 kW (700 hp) each
- Propellers: 2-bladed variable-pitch VISh-11V-20

Performance

- Maximum speed: 370 km/h (230 mph, 200 kn) at 2,250 metres (7,380 ft)
- Range: 800 km (500 mi, 430 nmi)
- Service ceiling: 7,750 m (25,430 ft)
- Time to height: 6 minutes to 3,000 metres (9,800 ft)

== Bibliography ==
- Gordon, Yefim; Komissarov, Dmitry and Sergey (2005). OKB Yakovlev: A History of the Design Bureau and its Aircraft. Hinckley, England: Midland Publishing. ISBN 1-85780-203-9.
- Gunston, Bill (1995). The Osprey Encyclopedia of Russian Aircraft 1875-1995. London: Osprey. ISBN 1-85532-405-9.
