= Feathers Hotel, Wrexham =

Former pub and inn in Wrexham, Wales

Feathers Hotel
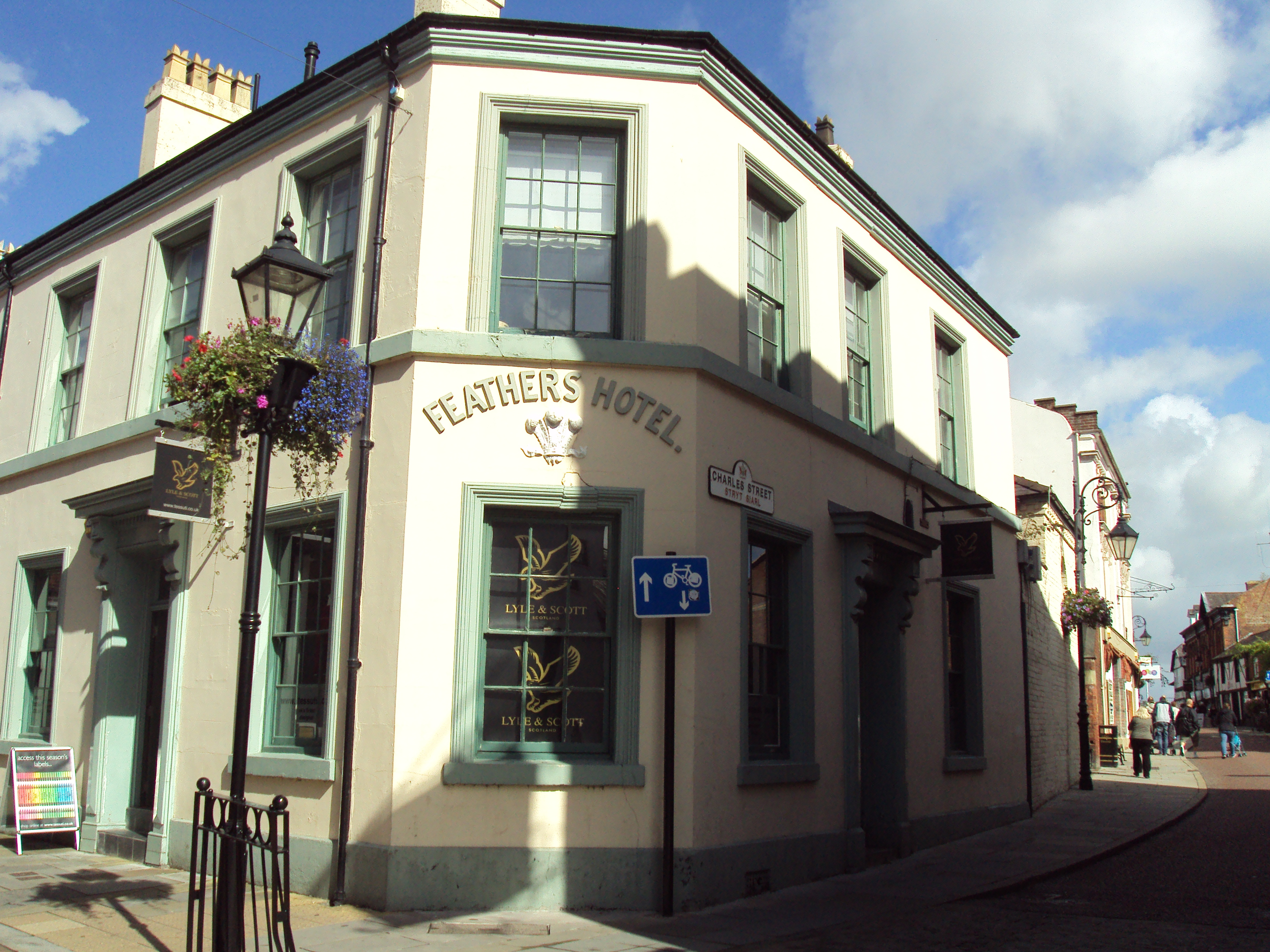
- The building from the corner of Charles Street (right) and Chester Street (left).
- Interactive map of the Feathers Hotel area
- Former names: The Plume of Feathers; Feathers Inn; The Prince of Wales
- Alternative names: The Feathers

General information
- Type: Former coaching Inn; Pub (–2001); Retail space and residential apartments (2001–)
- Coordinates: 53.045442°N 2.991338°W
- Construction started: c. 1630 (possibly)
- Renovated: c. 1850 – c. 1860
- Owner: Meredith family (~18th century)

Technical details
- Floor count: 2

Listed Building – Grade II
- Official name: The Feathers Public House
- Designated: 31 January 1994
- Reference no.: 1829

The Feathers Hotel is a former pub and coaching inn in Wrexham city centre, North Wales. First known as The Plume of Feathers, the building was popular with drovers heading to Wrexham's Beast Market. The inn was remodelled in the mid-19th century to extend its frontage onto an adjacent property on Chester Street. It closed as a pub in 2001, and has since been converted into a grocery shop and apartments.

== Description ==
The two-storey building was formerly a coaching inn, with remnants of the stables and coach house present behind the building, in painted brickwork and with a slate roof. Such remnants include a small round window in the side wall at the rear of the building used to transfer hay from a large hay wagon directly to the hay loft within the building. It was originally known as "The Plume of Feathers" and was owned by the Meredith family for over 200 years, with the building dating to possibly c. 1630. The inn was located on a popular throughfare for drovers to Wrexham's Beast Market. Prior to the railway reaching Wrexham, stagecoaches operated from the inn. It was known as the Feathers Inn by 1848, while the name "The Prince of Wales" is also attached to the building.

The current design of the building dates to a c. 1850 – c. 1860 remodelling, where the newly added façade was extended onto a pre-existing adjoining property, No. 62 Chester Street. Although No. 62 is separately roofed, with its gable appearing to be originally built facing the street and a parapet forms a partial false wall at its first floor level. No. 62 also houses the entrance to the present-day grocery shop, while the original building also retains their entrance. Both central entrances are recessed in an architrave. There are three upper windows in each of the two properties. Therefore, the building's current continuous frontage covers two original properties, which are two-storeyed and covered in original brickwork. The shop front dates to the late 19th century.

The structure and some elements of the original building have survived and they suggest the building was once timber-framed. The gable end of the building would have probably faced the street, with its roofline at a right angle to the street.

During the Victorian era, the building's stable yard was large enough to cater for 30 horses at the same time.

In 1875, following the death of James Armstrong of the Feathers Hotel, leaving his widow and seven small children with little resources, a benefit concert was held in Wrexham to raise money for the bereaved family.

By 1892, the building was owned by William Tickle, who greatly involved himself in the social life of Wrexham, leading to local societies holding their meeting inside the building.

The pub in the building closed in 2001, with the building later becoming fully refurbished and home to a clothes shop for a few years. The building is now (as of 2023) a Polish grocery store, with the upper floors converted into apartments.

== See also ==
- Wynnstay Arms Hotel, Wrexham
