= Elephant and Castle, Wrexham =

Historic pub in Wrexham, Wales

Elephant and Castle
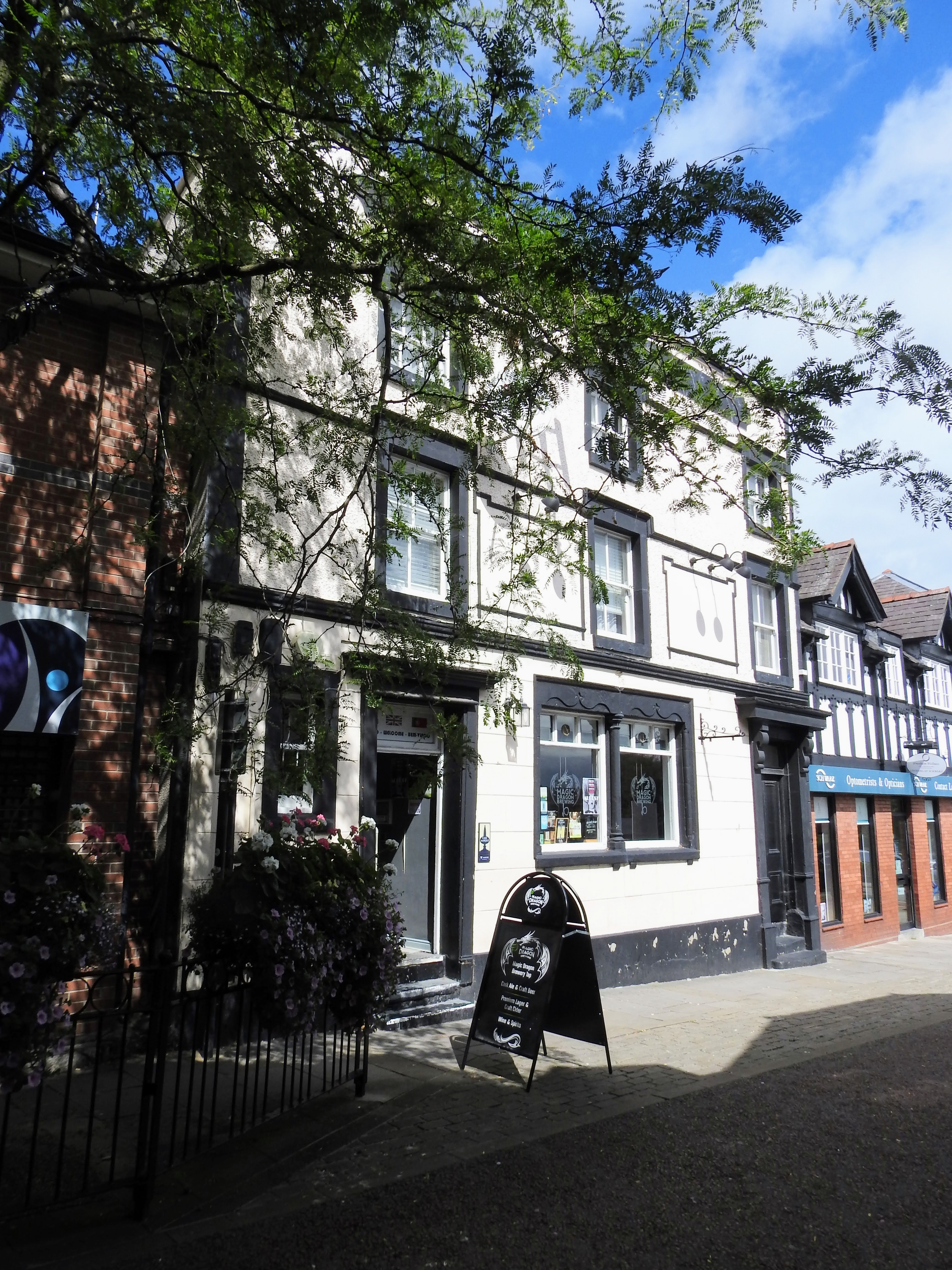
- Front of the building, as the Magic Dragon Brewery Tap in 2023

General information
- Type: Pub (c. 1788–1999; 2019–); Restaurant (2000s–2019)
- Address: 13 Charles Street, Wrexham, Wales
- Coordinates: 53.0457°N 2.9900°W
- Opened: 1788 (earliest mention)

The Elephant and Castle was a public house on Charles Street in Wrexham, Wales, known to have existed in 1788, and closed in 1999. The building has housed the Magic Dragon Brewery Tap since 2019.

It was sometimes known as the Elephant Inn.

== Description and history ==
The Elephant and Castle public house was first recorded in the local rate books in 1788, and closed in 1999.

The pub is named after the area of London with the same name. The pub was dependent on the trading occurring in the adjacent Beast Market.

Behind the pub, and adjoining the Beast Market to its south, was a saw mill, which belonged to Edward Meredith Jones by 1881.

During the 19th century, various incidents had taken place in the pub, including suicides and fights. One suicide was of George Smith (also known as William Smith) on 13 June 1863, who was the father of then 22-year old Annie Chapman, who would later be the second canonical victim of Jack the Ripper. Smith accompanied his employer to a horse racing event, and later lodged with his employer that evening at the pub, but that night, Smith committed suicide by cutting his throat.

In the late 1870s, the pub held a reputation locally for being a centre for debauchery, with fights and prostitution present in the pub. On one such occasion during this period, a local police superintendent had to dismiss three young police constables over their suspected use of the pub's prostitutes.

On New Year's Eve 1878, Ann Roach attempted to stab Bridget Brannan in the pub, whom she accused was maliciously gossiping about her, with a table fork after hitting Brannan with a poker. Roach and Brannan both lived in Elephant Yard located behind the inn, which had become notorious for crime. Roach was sentenced six months' hard labour, with Brannan later evicted due to lack of rent payment.

In 1879, a police superintendent told the magistrates that they considered the pub to be "the greatest curse of Wrexham", following accusations towards Caroline Edwards, a servant at the pub, of vagrancy for sleeping in the pub's yard. The landlady, Ellen Birch, responded using abusive language to the accusations of the pub.

On 15 September 1879, the magistrates renewed the licence for the pub but 'did so reluctantly'. By 1880, the pub had hired a barman with 14 known convictions while working at the pub, including inducing teenage boys to steal waterfowl, who was given 15 months hard labour in the same year.

The pub remained largely unchanged from the 1960s, and lost its license and closed in 1999. After closing, the premises housed various restaurants, including a Thai restaurant. It was later re-opened as a public house for the Magic Dragon Brewery as the Magic Dragon Brewery Tap in 2019. In 2023, the pub was announced by the Campaign for Real Ale (CAMRA) as the best pub in Wales.

== See also ==
- Wynnstay Arms Hotel, Wrexham, another old inn nearby
- History of Wrexham
