= History of Wrexham =

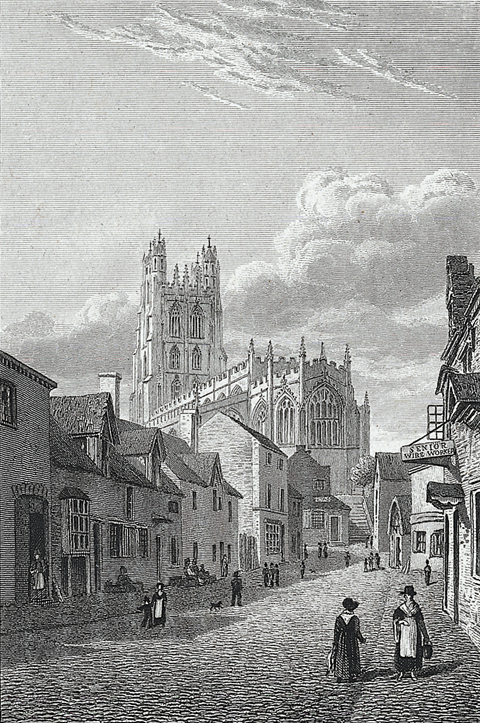
19th century engraving of Wrexham

The city of Wrexham in north-east Wales has a history dating back to ancient times. The former market town was the site of heavy industry in the 19th and 20th centuries, and is now an active commercial centre. Wrexham was granted city status in 2022.

== Prehistoric to Roman times ==
Approximately 8,000 years ago Mesolithic man ventured to what is now the Wrexham area. These people were hunter-gatherers and led a nomadic existence. They left little tangible evidence of their existence, save a number of small flint tools called microliths that have been found in the Borras area.

A number of Neolithic (4300 – 2300 BC) stone axe heads have been found in Borras, Darland and Johnstown.

Two Bronze Age mounds are situated within the city at Fairy Mount, Fairy Road and Hillbury on Hillbury Road. Both of these mounds lie within the grounds of Victorian properties in the south west of the city. It is likely that construction work within this area during the early 20th century eradicated other related features. The Acton Park Hoard of skilfully made early Middle Bronze Age axe heads found in Wrexham suggests that the area was a centre of advanced and innovative metalworking.

The area surrounding Wrexham is well served by several rivers, including the Clywedog, Alyn and Gwenfro, all of which are tributaries of the Dee. These rivers would have served as highways for early man. Finds within the Alyn area reveal that trade was taking place along this river with places as far away as Ireland during the Bronze Age.

A number of Iron Age hillforts also exist within the surrounding area, perhaps marking a tribal boundary. These include Bryn Alyn (near Bradley), Y Gaer (near Broughton, Flintshire) and Y Gardden (near Ruabon).

At the time of the Roman conquest of Britain, the area which Wrexham formed part of was held by a tribe called the Cornovii. The Cornovii held the lowland forests of Cheshire and Shropshire. Their tribal capital was at Wroxeter, near Shrewsbury. The original hill fort hillfort capital of the tribe was located on the Wrekin hill and one theory for the origins of the name 'Wrexham' is that it developed as a description of a settlement of men from the neighbourhood of the Wrekin: the 'Wrocansaetan' or 'Wreocensaetan'.

In 48 A.D the Roman Legions reached Wroxeter and then proceeded to attack a tribe called the Deceangli who were based in what is now Flintshire. Around 70 – 75 A.D the Legionary fortress of Deva was constructed (modern-day Chester) and for the next 300 years was the home of the Twentieth Legion.

Evidence of Roman occupations can be found at nearby Holt, where a tile and pottery works were constructed on the banks of the River Dee and at Ffrith where the remains of buildings have been located. In recent years evidence of Roman occupation nearer the city centre was found during the construction of the Plas Coch retail park. In 1995 further construction work on the site revealed traces of Roman field boundaries, hearths, a corn drying kiln and coins from the period c. AD150 –350. It is thought that these are the remains of a farmstead.

== Mercian conquest ==
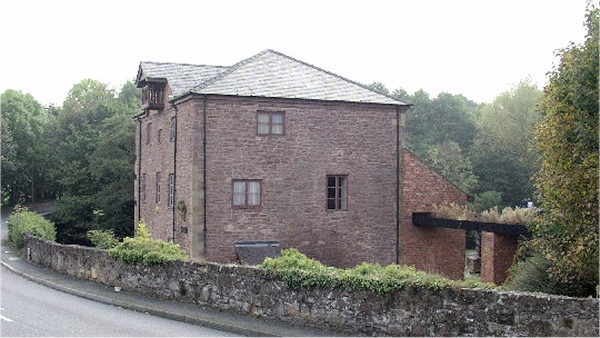
The King's Mill road

Wrexham formed part of the Romano-British Kingdom of Powys which emerged following the end of Roman rule in Britain and extended from the Cambrian mountains to the west to the modern west midlands region of England to the east. The dedication at Worthenbury to the 5th-century Bishop of Bangor St Deiniol suggests that this area was one of his outlying estates.

Towards the end of the 6th century, English settlers were penetrating along the upper Trent and laying the foundations of the kingdom of Mercia, a Latinisation of the Old English Mierce meaning 'border people'. Possibly by the early 7th century some English had settled peacefully on surplus lands in the border region and gradually the line connecting Tarvin and Macefen along the river Gowy and Broxton Hills in Cheshire could have formed the dividing line between the British (Welsh) and the English during the 7th century.

In 616 Aethelfrith of Northumbria defeated the combined forces of Gwynedd and Powys at the Battle of Chester and the royal Cynddylan dynasty of Powys was overthrown by the Mercians at the end of the 7th century. The English went on to dominate north-east Wales from the 8th to 10th centuries.

During the 8th century, the royal house of Mercia displayed militaristic dominance and took advantage of the weakness of Powys to push their frontiers westwards. In 796 a battle between the Welsh and Mercians was fought at Rhuddlan and in the 8th century the Mercians established the earth boundaries of Wat's Dyke and Offa's Dyke between the Welsh kingdom of Powys and the English kingdom of Mercia. These boundaries pass just to the west of the site of Wrexham suggesting that during the 8th century the area lay within the bounds of Mercia.

In the 8th century, the settlement of Wrexham was likely founded by Mercian colonists from the Midlands during this first advance. The settlement was founded on the flat ground above the meadows of the River Gwenfro which would have provided high-quality grazing for animals. The etymological origins of the name 'Wrexham' may possibly be traced back to this period as being derived from an Old English personal name, 'Wryhtel' and 'hamm' meaning water meadow or enclosure within the bend of a river i.e. Wryhtel's meadow. The district was known in English as Bromfield.

Despite the establishment of Anglo-Saxon political control across the Marcher region in the 7th century, there is little evidence to support the idea of a substantial English folk movement into the region during the 7th or 8th centuries. The overall Anglo-Saxon occupation of the Wrexham area seems to have been partial for while Wrexham and a number of surrounding settlements have seemingly English names, the names of fields in the area were predominantly Welsh until the beginning of the 20th century.

== Welsh restoration and border conflict ==
Renewed Welsh and Viking attacks led to a contraction in English power in north Wales in the early-10th century yet English kings seem to have nominally dominated the area till the reign of Ethelred II (978–1016).

The English dominance in north Wales further declined with the rise of Gruffudd ap Llewellyn who was recognised as King of Wales by Edward the Confessor in 1056 and likely took control of all the land to the west of the River Dee, including Wrexham. The Welsh remained in possession of the Wrexham area at the time of the taking of the Domesday Survey of 1086 and the settlement is therefore not mentioned in the survey.

The boundary of Offa's Dyke lost its significance and between 1086 and 1277 the Wrexham areas formed part of the native Welsh lordship of Maelor. The Lords of Maelor had their seat at Dinas Bran and their lands stretched north from Dinas Bran to beyond Marford with the Dee as their eastern boundary and the uplands of Hope as their western limits. The lordship was divided into two commotes each with their Maerdrefi (chief manors) at Wrexham and Marford respectively. The Wrexham commote (cymwd) was formed of the greater part of Bromfield and became known as 'Maelor Cymraeg' ('Welsh Maelor').

Under the lordship of Maelor, Welsh law was enforced in Wrexham by Welsh officials and Welsh customs prevailed. Palmer describes the area as being 'thoroughly Cymricized' with the English inhabitants being 'either slain, expelled or absorbed'. The Welsh re-colonisation of the border region is likely to have taken place as a result of the forward policy of the Princes of Powys.

The lordship remained disputed between the Welsh and English during the 12th century. The Annals of Chester state that the castle of Bromfield (the English name for Maelor) was burned by the English in 1140 and the King Henry II pipe roll of 1161 records that a castle is present at 'Wristlesham', the first recorded reference to the then town.

Henry II himself led his forces up the Ceiriog Valley in 1165 but was defeated by Welsh forces led by Owain Gwynedd at the Battle of Crogen. However, the Chronicle of St Werburgh's Chester records that in 1177 Earl Hugh of Chester had conquered the whole of Bromfield. Any English advance ultimately proved temporary however as the area was re-conquered by the Welsh Princes of Powys and was undisputedly in the hands of the house of Powys Fadog in the early years of the 13th century.

The Princes of Powys skilfully dealt with their belligerent neighbours, Gwynedd and England, and the stability allowed Wrexham to develop as a trading town and administrative centre of the cwmwd (commote). In 1202 Madog ap Gruffydd Maelor, Lord of Dinas Brân, granted to his newly founded Cistercian abbey of Valle Crucis some of his demesne lands in 'Wrechcessham'. In 1220, the earliest reference of Wrexham Parish Church is made when it is mentioned with reference to the bishop of St Asaph, who gave the monks of Valle Crucis in nearby Llangollen half of the income of the Church in Wrexham.

In 1276 Madog II ap Gruffydd, Prince of Powys Fadog and Lord of Dinas Brân, did homage to Edward I and his tenants were received into the king's peace. When Madoc II ap Gruffydd died in 1277 his estates were taken over by the Crown to be administered by the king in trust for the prince's two infant sons. In 1281 the two boys went missing and are traditionally speculated to have been drowned under the orders of the Norman John de Warenne, Earl of Surrey, who was a leading supporter in Edward I's Welsh campaigns.

In 1282 Llywelyn ap Gruffudd, Prince of Wales was killed, Wales lost its independence and John de Warenne was granted the lordships of Bromfield (Maelor) and Yale (derived from the neighbouring cantref of Iâl) by King Edward I in 1282. The tensions of this period are revealed by the suggestion that in 1282 the men of Bromfield needed the King's protection if they were to pass without molestation to and from the markets of Chester and Oswestry and Edward I himself is reported to have briefly stayed at Wrexham during his expedition to suppress the revolt of Madoc Ap Llewellyn in 1294.

== Later Middle Ages ==
From 1327 onwards, the then town is referred to as a villa mercatoria (market town) and by 1391 Wrexham was wealthy enough for a bard, jester, juggler, dancer and goldsmith to earn their living there.

The traditional pattern of Welsh life remained undisturbed, and until the close of the Middle Ages the pattern was for English incomers to be rapidly assimilated into Wrexham's Welsh society, for instance adopting Welsh patronymics.

At the beginning of the 15th century, the local gentry and peasants backed the rebellion led by Owain Glyndŵr which proved economically disastrous for the settlement. Local poet Glyn Guto'r Glyn (c. 1412 – c. 1493) wrote of Sion ap Madog, the great-nephew of Owain Glyndŵr, as Alecsander i Wrecsam (an Alexander for Wrexham).

In the mid-15th century, the parish church was gutted by fire. The main part of the current church was built in the late 15th and early 16th centuries.

== 16th to 17th centuries ==
The Acts of Union passed during the reign of Henry VIII brought the lordship into the full system of English administration and law. It became part of the new shire of Denbighshire in 1536.

The economic character remained predominantly agricultural into the 17th century but there were workshops of weavers, smiths, nailers as well as dye houses. A grammar school was established in 1603 by Alderman Valentine Broughton of Chester.

The 1620 Norden's jury of survey of Wrexham Regis stated that four-fifths of the land-holding classes of Wrexham bore Welsh names and every field except one within the manor bore a Welsh or semi-Welsh name.

During the English Civil War, Wrexham was on the side of the Royalists, as most Welsh gentry supported the King, but local landowner Sir Thomas Myddelton, owner of Chirk Castle, supported Parliament.

== 18th and 19th centuries ==
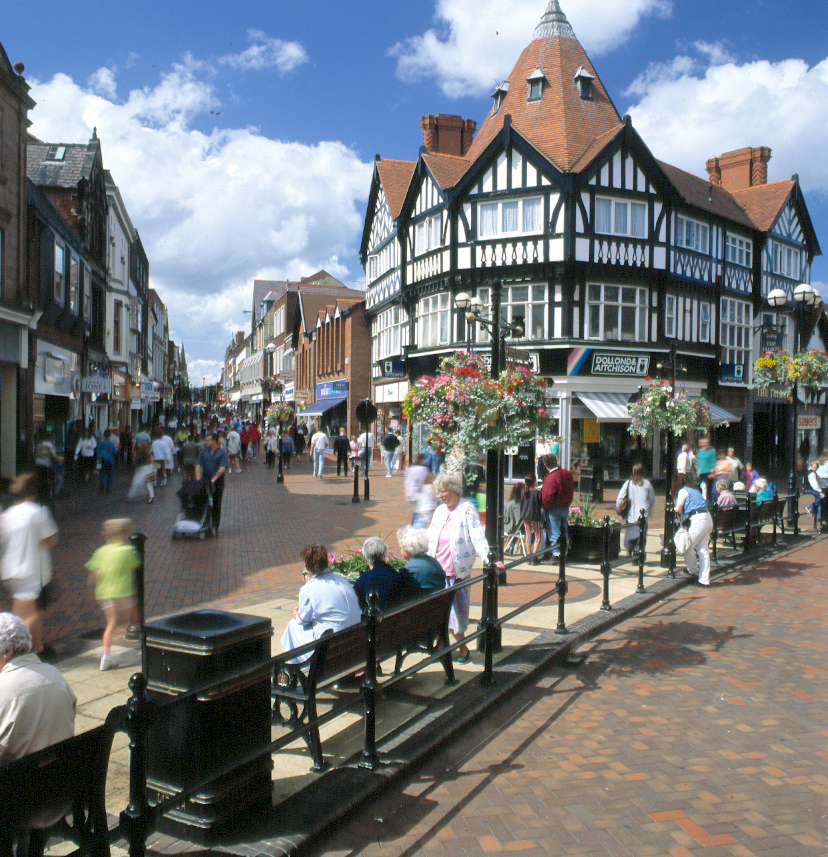
Wrexham town centre

In the 18th century, Wrexham was known for its leather industry with skinners and tanners in the then town. The horns from cattle were used to make things like combs and buttons. There was also a nail-making industry in Wrexham but in the mid-18th century, Wrexham was no more than a small market town with a population of perhaps 2,000.

In the late 18th century Wrexham was transformed by the coming of the Industrial Revolution. It began when the famous entrepreneur John Wilkinson (1728–1808) known as 'Iron Mad Wilkinson' opened Bersham Ironworks in 1762. In 1793 he opened a smelting plant at Brymbo.

Wrexham gained its first newspaper in 1848. Market Hall was built in the same year. In 1849 Wrexham was described as:

"A market town, a parliamentary borough, the head of a Union, and a parish, chiefly in the hundred of Bromfield, county of Denbigh; 26 miles (SE by E) from Denbigh, 18 (ESE) from Ruthin, and 187½ (NW) from London; ..... and containing 12,921 inhabitants, of whom 5818 are in the townships of Wrexham Abbot and Wrexham Regis, forming the town."

Wrexham was connected to the rest of the UK by rail in 1849 and this eventually became a large and complex network of railways, the main branch being the Wrexham and Minera Branch, which supported the steelworks at nearby Brymbo Steel Mill and the Minera Limeworks. In 1895, the Wrexham and Ellesmere Railway was completed and cut a swathe through the city centre.

In 1863 a volunteer fire brigade was founded.

Wrexham benefited from good underground water supplies which were essential to the brewing of good beer and brewing became one of its main industries. In the middle of the 19th century, there were 19 breweries in and around the city Several of these were comparatively large breweries, together with many smaller breweries situated at local inns. Some of the more famous old breweries were the Albion, Cambrian, Eagle, Island Green, Nag's Head (Soames) and Willow.

However, the most famous was the Wrexham Lager brewery which was built between 1881 and 1882 in Central Road. This was the first brewery to be built in the United Kingdom to produce lager beer. Another major producer, Border Breweries, was formed in 1931 by a merger of Soames, Island Green, and the Oswestry firm of Dorsett Owen.

Wrexham is on the edge of the rich Ruabon area marl beds and several brickworks sprang up in the area, among these, the most well known was Wrexham Brick and Tile and Davies Brothers in Abenbury, on the outskirts of Wrexham.

Coal mining was an important industry in the area, and provided employment for large numbers of Wrexham people, however, most of the mines were situated well outside of the city. Wrexham's coalfield was part of the larger North East Wales field. A number of deep mines were constructed throughout the area including Llay, Gresford, Bersham and Johnstown. A number of new settlements were built on the edge of the city to accommodate miners at a number of the sites including Llay and Pandy (for Gresford).

Other forms of mining and quarrying have taken place around Wrexham throughout its history, these include lead extracted from Minera.

== 20th and 21st centuries ==
Location of Wrexham County Borough within Wales

In the latter half of the 20th century, Wrexham began a period of depression: the many coal mines closed first, followed by the brickworks and other industries, and finally the steelworks (which had its own railway branch up until closure) in the 1980s. Wrexham faced an economic crisis. Many residents were anxious to sell their homes and move to areas with better employment prospects, however buyers were uninterested in an area where there was little prospect of employment. Many home-owners were caught in a negative equity trap. Wrexham was suffering from the same problems as much of Industrialised Britain and saw little investment in the 1970s.

In the 1980s and 1990s, the Welsh Development Agency (WDA) intervened to improve Wrexham's situation: it funded a major dual carriageway called the A483 bypassing Wrexham city centre and connecting it with Chester and Shrewsbury, which in turn had connections with other big cities such as Manchester and Liverpool. It also funded shops and reclaimed areas environmentally damaged by the coal industry. The city centre was regenerated and attracted a growing number of high street chain stores. However, the biggest breakthrough was the Wrexham Industrial Estate, previously used in the Second World War, which became home to many manufacturing businesses including Kellogg's, JCB, Duracell and Pirelli. It is now the fifth-largest industrial estate in Europe (second in the UK) by area with over 250 businesses. There are also a number of other large industrial estates in the Wrexham area, with companies such as Sharp, Brother, Cadbury, and Flexsys.

On 21 November 2012, Brother made the last British typewriter at its Wrexham factory.

=== Economy ===
In November 2006 unemployment in Wrexham stood at 1.9%. This was below the averages for Wales of 2.3%, and England and the UK of 2.5%.

=== Caia Park riot ===
In June 2003, a large disturbance took place in the Caia Park estate, which has become known as The Caia Park Riots. Tension developed between Iraqi Kurd refugees and local residents centred on one of the estate's pubs (The Red Dragon, Wrexham), which gradually escalated and resulted in petrol bombs and other missiles being hurled at police trying to restore order. 51 people appeared in court, of whom eight, all long-term residents, received custodial sentences of up to two years.

=== Developments and regeneration ===
Recent years have seen a large amount of redevelopment in Wrexham's city centre. The creation and re-development of civic and public areas such as Queens Square, Belle Vue Park and Llwyn Isaf have improved the area dramatically. New shopping areas have been created at Henblas Square, Island Green and Eagles Meadow.

=== Bid for city status ===
Wrexham is the largest settlement in North Wales and has applied for city status several times. In 2002 it applied as part of the celebrations for the Golden Jubilee of Elizabeth II. Other Welsh applicants were Aberystwyth, Machynlleth, Newtown, Newport and St Asaph, and city status was awarded to Newport. Wrexham applied again in 2012 as part of the Diamond Jubilee but lost out to St Asaph. In 2022, Wrexham succeeded in gaining city status being the only Welsh bid for the 2022 civic honours, and was announced on 20 May 2022 that its bid was successful. It has been formally awarded the status by letters patent on 1 September 2022, with the council host celebrations every Saturday in September.

== Historic hotels, inns and public houses ==
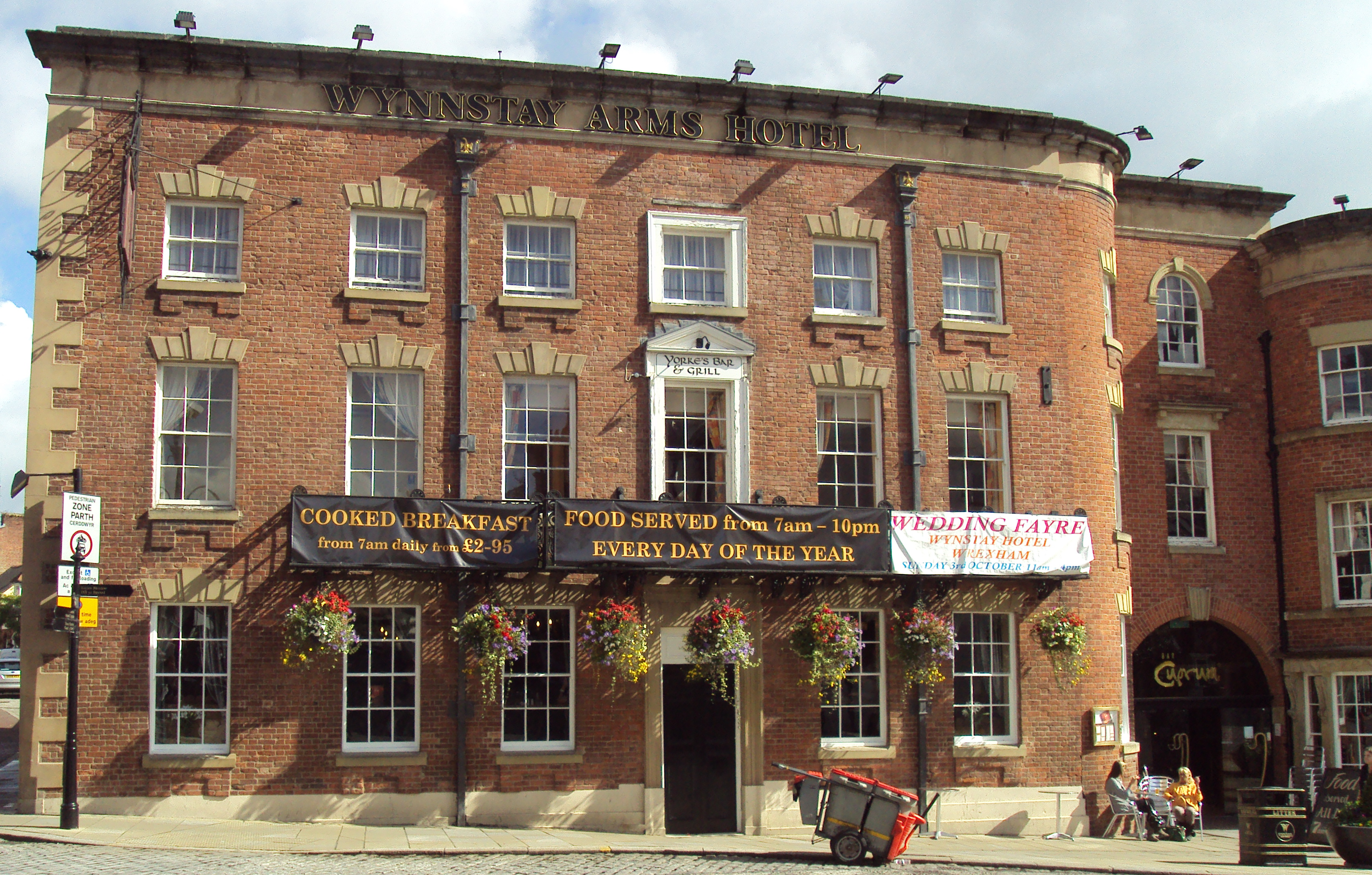
Wynnstay Arms Hotel

=== Wynnstay Arms Hotel ===
The Wynnstay Arms Hotel on Yorke Street was built in the eighteenth century. Its name refers to Wynnstay, a country house in Ruabon. The Football Association of Wales was founded at a meeting in the hotel on 2 February 1876.

=== Elephant and Castle ===
The Elephant and Castle, Charles Street was a public house. It was known to have existed in 1788, and closed in 1999.

On 13 June 1863, George Smith (also known as William Smith), who was lodging at the Elephant and Castle, committed suicide by cutting his throat. George Smith was the father of Annie Chapman, the second canonical victim of Jack the Ripper.

=== Feathers Inn ===
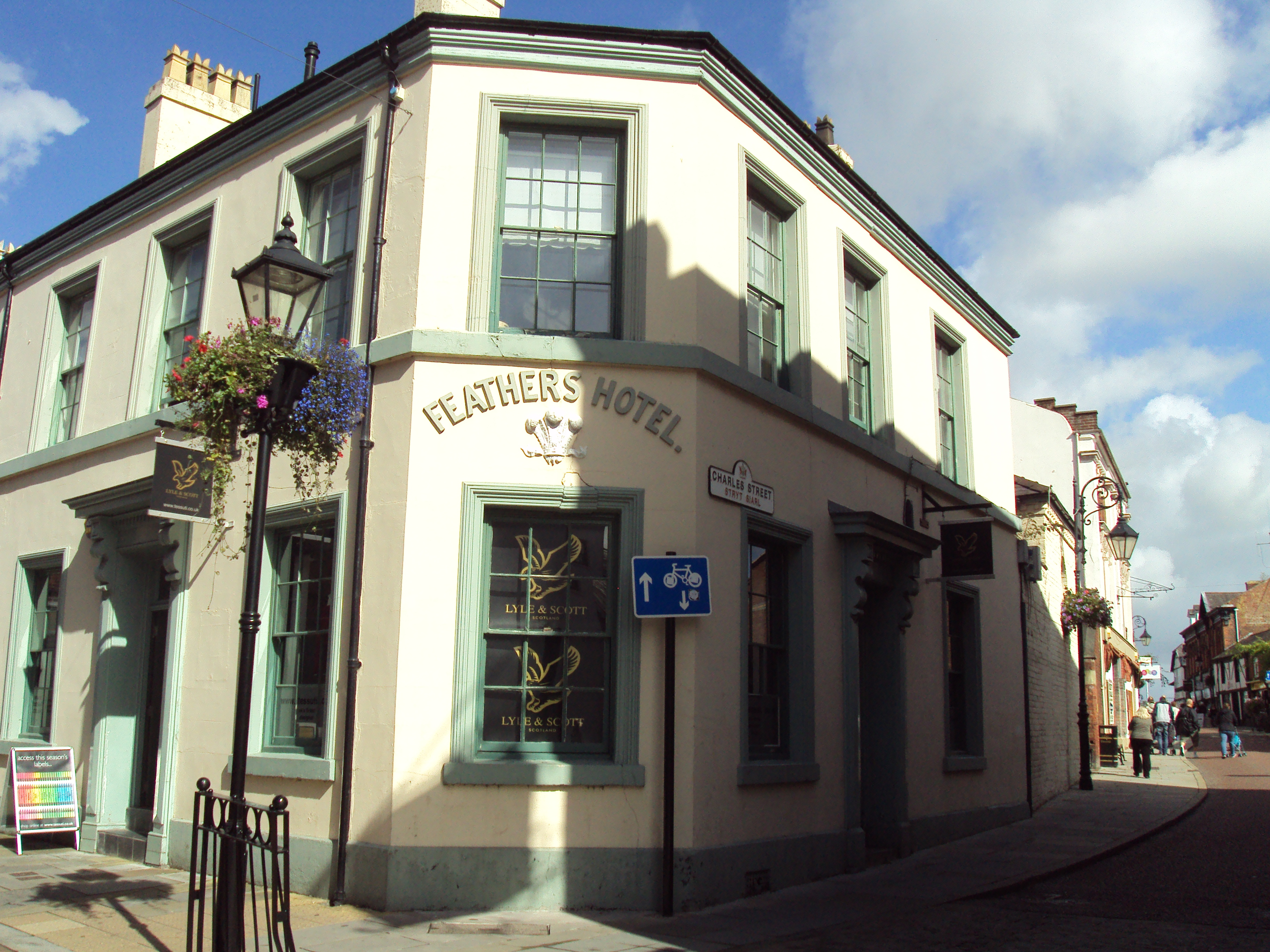
Feathers Inn

The Feathers Inn, Chester Street was a coaching inn. It was established in the late 18th century as the Plume of Feathers. It closed in the late 1990s and is now used as a shop.

The original inn was demolished or rebuilt in about 1850–1860. The adjoining property number 62 Chester Street was incorporated into the inn. It is a two-storey rendered brick building with brick coach houses and stables at the rear. It was grade II listed on 31 January 1994.

=== Turf Hotel ===
The Turf Hotel, Mold Road (also known as the Turf Tavern) was established in the 1840s. It was the only pub in the United Kingdom to be built inside the grounds of a football club.
