= Feathers Hotel =

The Feathers Hotel may refer to:

- Feathers Hotel, Ludlow, Shropshire
- The Feathers Hotel, Ledbury, Herefordshire
- Seven Feathers Casino Resort, Canyonville, Oregon
- Feathers Hotel, Wrexham
