= Wynnstay Arms Hotel, Wrexham =

Historic hotel and pub in Wrexham, Wales

Wynnstay Arms
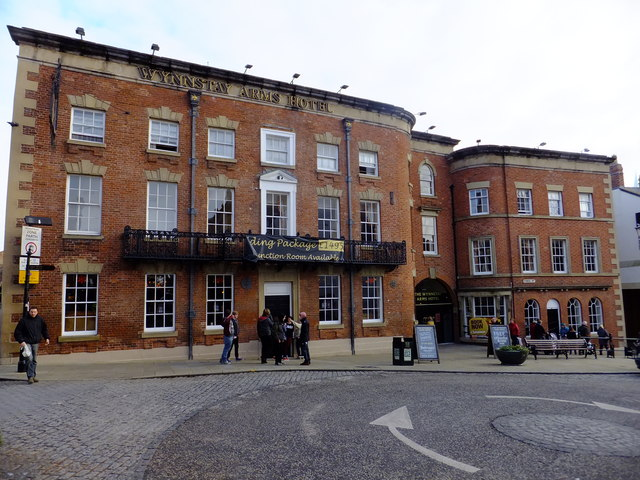
- The building's Georgian red brick façade
- Interactive map of the Wynnstay Arms area
- Former names: The George (1702; 1721); The Eagles (1730; 1822); Eagles Inn (derivative); Wynnstay Hall (1822–1973); The Crest (1973–1985)
- Alternative names: The Wynnstay
- Hotel chain: Marston's

General information
- Architectural style: Georgian red brick (frontage)
- Location: Yorke Street, Wrexham LL13 8LP
- Coordinates: 53.0452°N 2.9912°W
- Construction started: Mid-18th Century

Technical details
- Floor count: 3

Other information
- Number of rooms: 47

Website
- wynnstayarmshotelwrexham.co.uk

Listed Building – Grade II
- Official name: Wymmstay Arms Hotel
- Designated: 30 May 1951; Amended 31 January 1994
- Reference no.: 1759

The Wynnstay Arms is a hotel and pub in Wrexham city centre, Wales. It is located on Yorke Street and directly on the eastern end of Wrexham's High Street. The building is a Grade II listed building for its surviving Georgian red brick façade, while most of the building was demolished and rebuilt in the 1970s.

The Football Association of Wales was formed at the hotel in 1876, and Prime Minister, David Lloyd George is said to have announced the end of World War I from the building's balcony in 1918.

== Description ==
The front of the three-storey Georgian red brick building dates to the mid 18th century. The original façade of the building is protected and was built in 1780, in place of an earlier inn. The façade has an ornate cast-iron balcony with Grecian motifs for its first floor. The façade contributes to its Grade II listing. Parts of the street frontage to the right of its entrance date to the early 19th century. The building also houses a Jacobean ballroom and an Adam fireplace.

== History ==
A small inn on the existing building's site was first known as "the George" in 1702. It became known as "the Eagles" in 1730, following the inn's enlargement and under the ownership of the Williams-Wynn family of Wynnstay, a country house near Wrexham. Also known by the derivatives "Eagles Inn", "The Three Eagles" or "The Three Spread Eagles", referencing the Williams-Wynn family coat of arms. It still retained the name "The Eagles" by 1822. The hotel's name gave the area the term "Eagles Meadow", which is since used by a shopping centre near the hotel. The name "Wynnstay Arms" (or "Wynnstay Hall") was said to be first used in 1822, but the previous name "the Eagles" still was pre-dominant, with it later referred to in a 1844 tithe schedule as "The Eagles Inn".

To the rear of the hotel, along Charles Street at No.23, was another separate hotel known as the Blossoms Hotel. It also had a stable, located to Wynnstay's rear. It was later demolished, with the site becoming part of the Wynnstay Arms.

Prior to the railway reaching Wrexham, stagecoaches operated from the hotel.

In the 18th century, it served as the meeting place for the "Circle of the White Rose" ("The Cycle") a Jacobite society which included members of the Williams-Wynn, family of Wynnstay and the founding meeting for the Football Association of Wales, the latter taking place in February 1876, and is commemorated with a plaque on the building. The Freemasons, Rotary Club and Round Table were also said to have met in the hotel.

David Lloyd George, Prime Minister of the United Kingdom is said to have announced the end of World War I in 1918 from the building's balcony. William Gladstone, another British Prime Minister, who lived in Hawarden was also said to have delivered speeches from the building's first floor cast-iron balcony.

=== Partial demolition ===
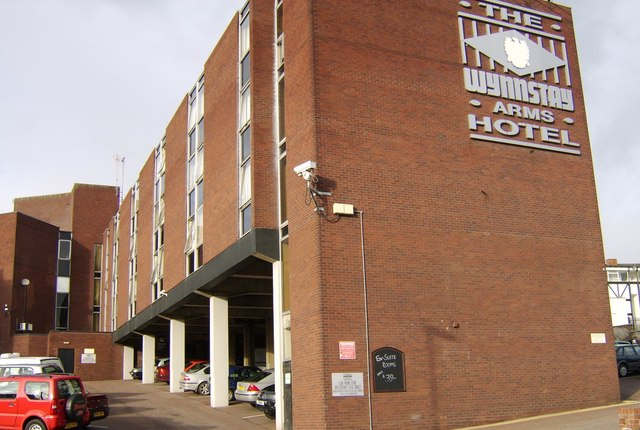
The rear side of the hotel, built following the 1970s demolition of the rear parts of the original building.

The building was sold in the 1960s and plans were made to completely demolish the building. A campaign was launched to prevent the demolition of the building. Following increased pressure on the owners, a compromise was reached, where the Georgian façade of the building facing High Street would be preserved and not demolished, while the remaining rear of the building would be demolished and replaced by a modern hotel and car park. The old Yorke Street coaching entrance became the building's main street entrance. The entire building except the façades were demolished between 1970 and 1973, with the new hotel built behind the old façade, and opened in 1973 as "The Crest", also termed "Crest Motel/Hotel", or Wrexham Crest Hotel. The hotel reverted to "The Wynnstay Arms Hotel" in May 1985, when it was sold to Burtonwood Brewery.

=== Booth ownership ===
In April 2010, the hotel was bought by Stephanie Booth, a local businesswoman. Booth promised to spend a minimum of £1 million in the first year on the hotel for refurbishment. Booth stated she wanted to restore the building's "past glories". During Booth's ownership, she also organised street festivals and fun days in Wrexham. The hotel featured in the second series of BBC documentary series "Hotel Stephanie" in 2011. The series documented Booth's experience in managing her hotels.

In July 2011, the hotel and pub was forced to close when their owner Llangollen Hotels, owned by Booth, went into administration and citing "financial [difficulties]". It was the only hotel to shut, and was directed to shut before the administrators were appointed. The building was taken over by Marston's Brewery, who refurbished the building.

The hotel reopened on 20 April 2012, following a £350,000 refurbishment by Marston's. The building contains a restaurant, two conference rooms and a function room.

== See also ==
- Elephant and Castle, Wrexham, another old inn nearby
- History of Wrexham
