= Feathers (Australian band) =

Australian dream pop band

- Origin: Brisbane, Queensland, Australia
- Genres: Dream pop
- Years active: 2006–2015
- Label: Bon Voyage
- Past members: Michelle Brown; Helena Papageorgiou; Innez Tulloch; Susan Milanovic

Feathers were an Australian dream pop band formed in Brisbane, Queensland in 2006. From 2009, they consisted of Michelle Brown (vocals, guitar, bass guitar), Helena Papageorgiou, Innez Tulloch (bass guitar) and Susan Milanovic (drums). They issued an album, Hunter's Moon, in October 2011 and created dark reverb laden psychedelic dream pop with a 1960s garage edge. By 2015 they were no longer active.

== History ==
Feathers were created by Michelle Brown (vocals, guitar, bass guitar) and Helena Papageorgiou in 2006. They were joined in late 2009 by Innez Tulloch on bass guitar, and Susan Milanovic after their previous drummer left the group. Feathers played shows with international acts including Earthless, Vivian Girls and Best Coast. They also played alongside Australian artists including Witch Hats.

Feathers released Hunter's Moon in October 2011 through label Bon Voyage. Hunter's Moon received airplay on Australian community radio stations including 4ZZZ Brisbane, where it came in at number 1 on the weekly top 20 new releases. Melyssa Mineo of Obscure Sound found it to be "infectious lo-fi dream-pop" showing "different moods and well-executed hooks, not to mention some great vocal performances". The Thousands' Chris Campion felt, "[they] balance the best elements of genres ranging from 60s psych to 80s jangle and dream pop with effortless swagger and ease". By 2015, the group had disbanded except for occasional one-off shows. As from 2016 Papageorgiou was a member of the band Black Vacation.
