= Feathering (disambiguation) =

Feathering may refer to:

- Plumage
- Feathering, a technique used in computer graphics to blur edges.
- Feathering, vertical justification in typesetting.
- Feathering (reentry) (also feathered reentry, or shuttlecock reentry), an atmospheric reentry technique for spacecraft
- Feathering (propeller), changing an aircraft or wind turbine propeller blade by angling the blades parallel to airflow
- Feathering (clutch), alternately engaging and disengaging an automotive clutch
- Tarring and feathering, a type of punishment of medieval and early modern times
- Feathering (horse), long hair on the lower legs of some breeds of horse
- Fletching an arrow or similar missile

== See also ==
- Feather (disambiguation)
