= Feathers (play) =

Play written by Eliza Power

Feathers is the debut play by Eliza Power, a modern retelling of the story of Tereus, Procne and Philomela from Ovid's Metamorphoses. The play premiered at the White Bear Theatre in London in July 2010. It then transferred to C Central at the Edinburgh Fringe Festival where it received critical acclaim.
