= Charles Street, Wrexham =

Street in Wrexham, Wales

Charles Street
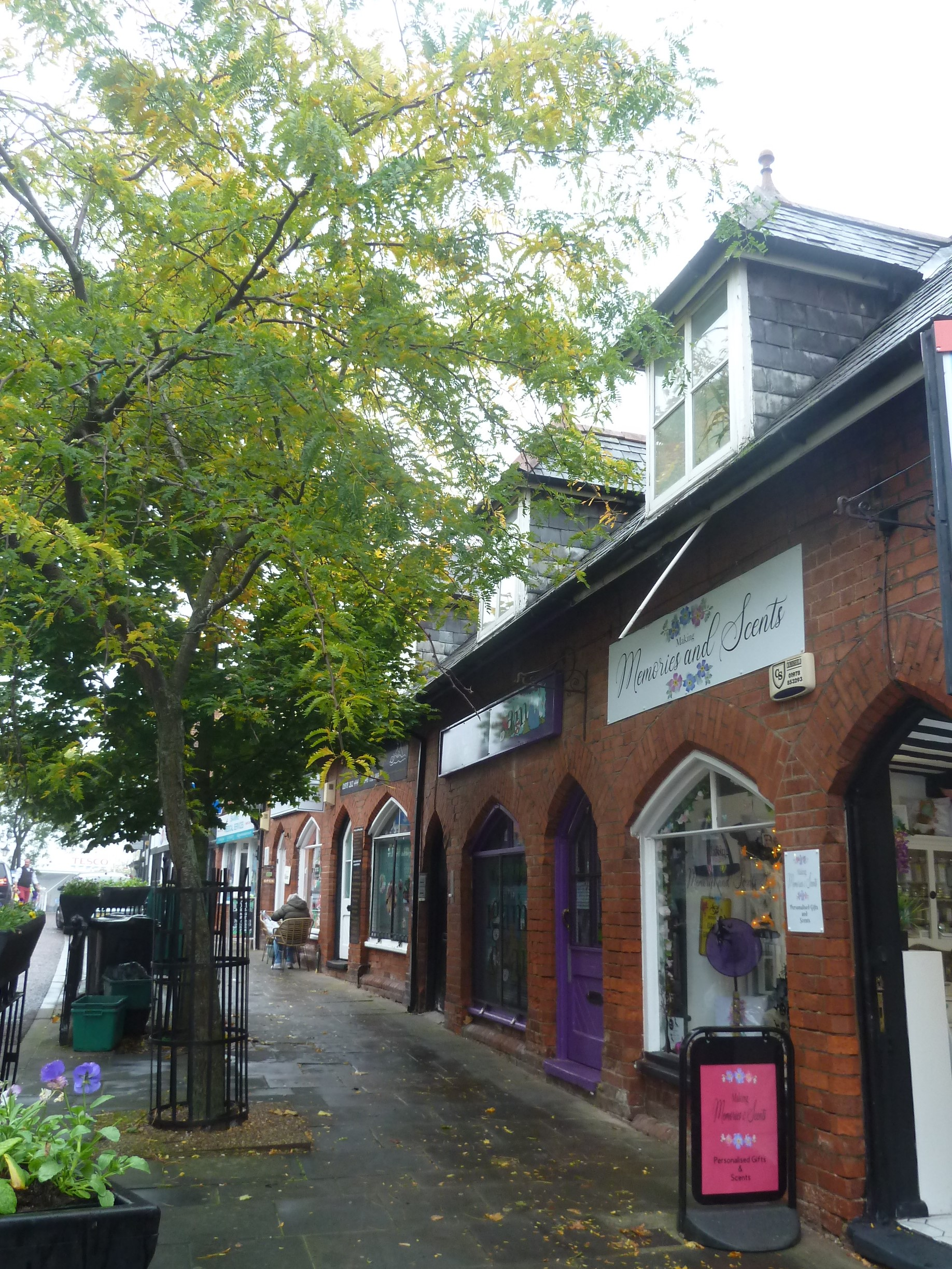
- Part of the No. 20–23 terrace.
- Native name: Stryt Siarl (Welsh)
- Part of: Wrexham city centre
- Location: Wrexham, Wales
- Coordinates: 53.0455°N 2.9904°W

Charles Street (Welsh: Stryt Siarl) is a street in Wrexham city centre, North Wales. It contains multiple listed buildings.

It was originally considered part of the High Street, but later became known as Beast Market Street due to its importance as a drovers' road towards Wrexham's Beast Market. Today, the street is known for its small independent businesses.

The listed buildings on the street include the No. 20–23 terrace, and parts of the Wynnstay Arms Hotel and former Feathers Hotel. The street was also home to the Elephant and Castle pub, a historically notorious pub in Wrexham.

== Listed buildings ==
=== No. 20–23 ===
Nos. 20, 21, 22 and 23, collectively form a 19th-century four-building terrace, located to the rear of the Wynnstay Arms Hotel, on Charles Street, of which all are now shops with accommodation on their upper floors. The terrace is an adaptation of an earlier, possibly 17th-century, timber-framed building. The building's front is made of brick dating to the 17th century, while its internal cross walls (and possibly the structure of its roof) have surviving timber framing. It has chamfered arches of brick serving as its doorways and shop windows, as well as a similarly arched central entrance. Its roof is steeply pitched slate. No. 20 to 23 are a notable surviving timber-framed structure in Wrexham, as well as known for its late 19th century shop design.

Behind No. 22 was a tannery, belonging to Meredith Jones, while No. 22 was the premises of the last wooden clog-maker in Wrexham, Fletchers.

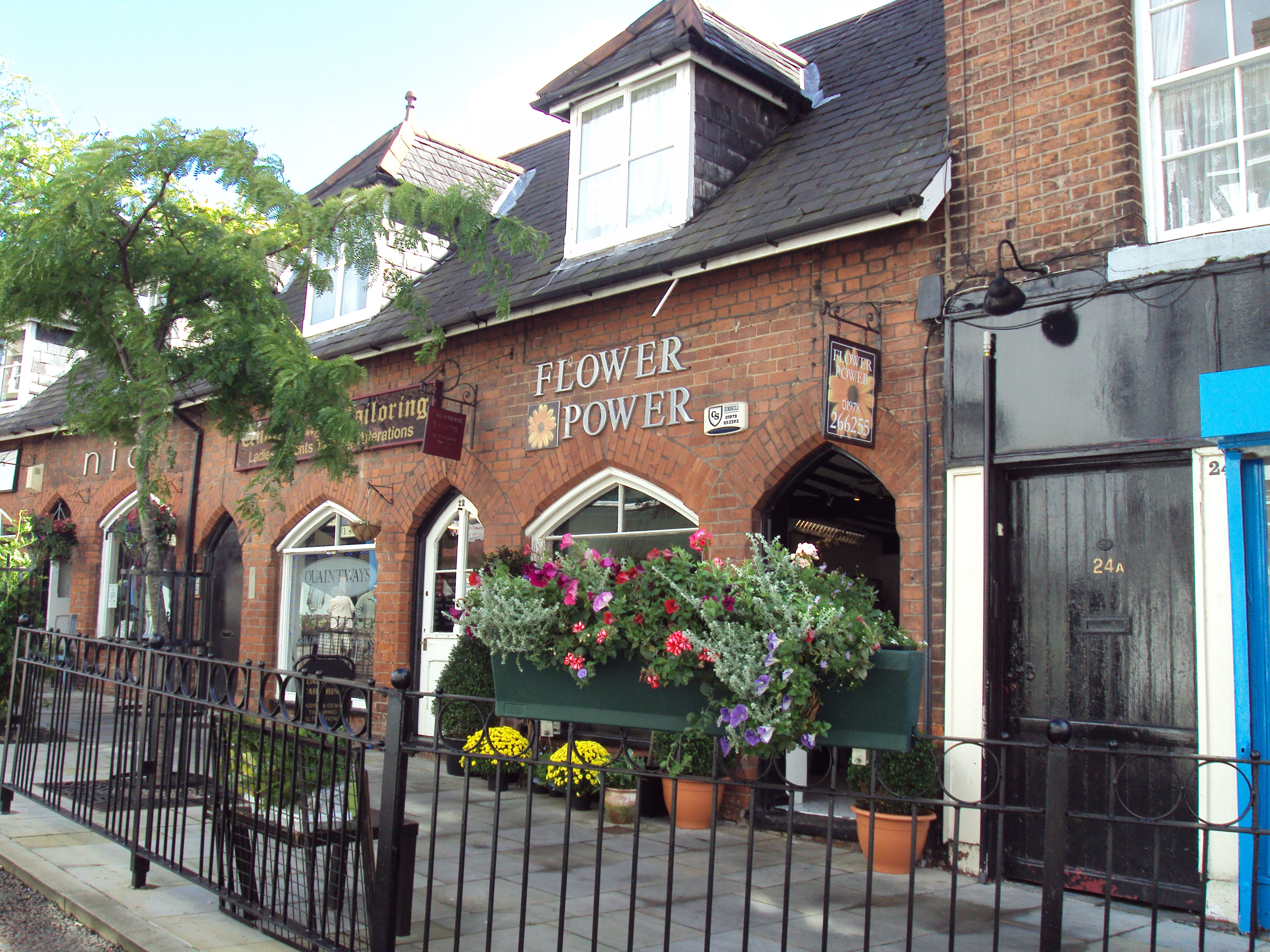
Another part of the 20–23 terrace.

No. 23 was previously the site of a hotel known as the Blossoms Hotel, located at the rear of the Wynnstay Arms Hotel, and had a stable. It had been an inn since 1723 at least. It was later demolished, with the hotel becoming part of the Wynnstay Arms.

=== Feathers Hotel ===
The Feathers Hotel is located on the corner of Charles Street and Chester Street. On its Charles Street side, remnants of its old stables and coach house can be seen behind the main building at its rear. This references the period when it was a coaching inn, due to its location on Charles Street, which was a drovers' road towards Wrexham's Beast Market. In the Victorian times, its stable yard could have accommodated 30 horses.

=== Wynnstay Arms ===
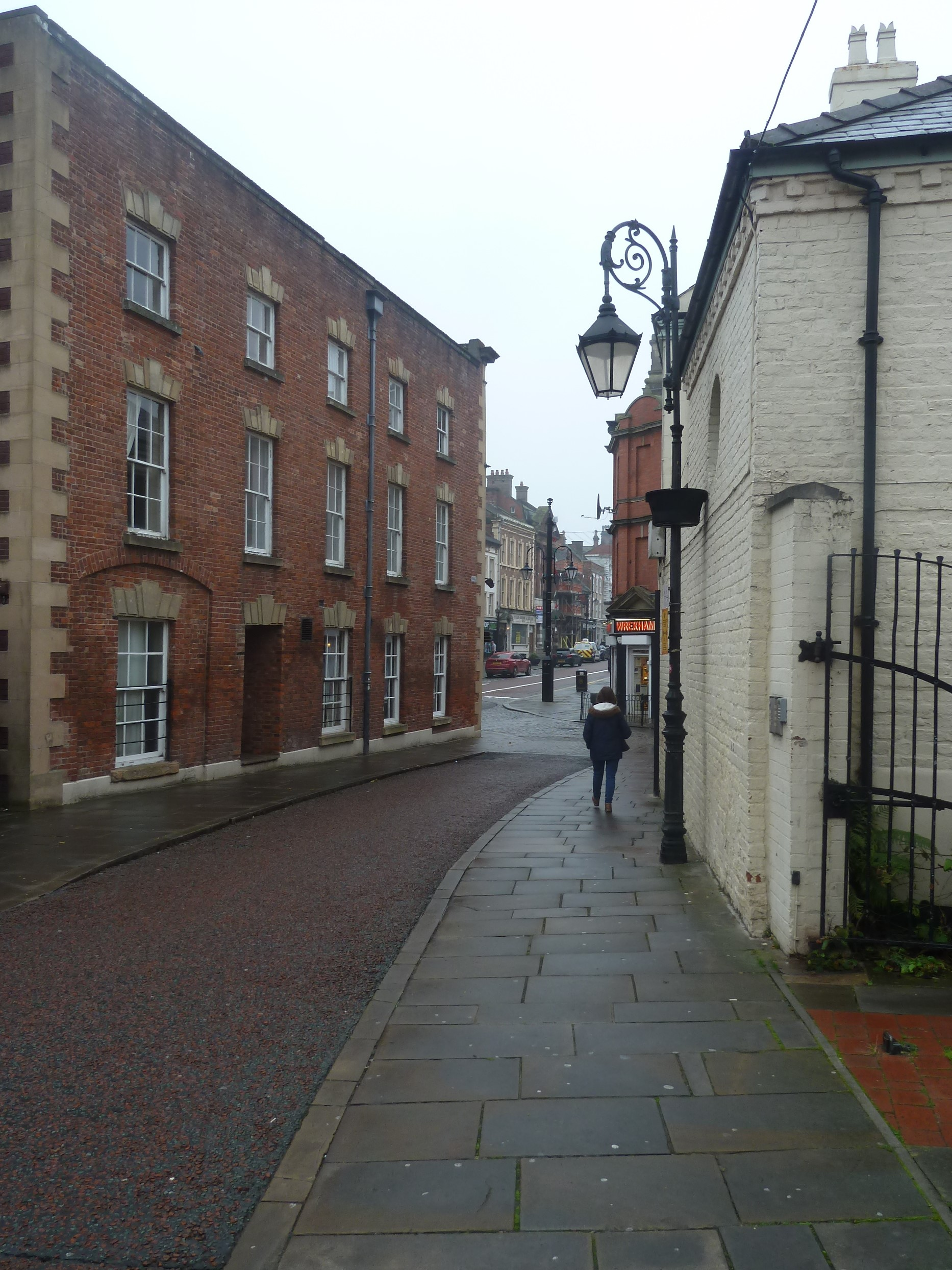
View of Charles Street, to the High Street, across the junction between Yorke Street and Chester Street, with the old parts of the Wynnstay Arms Hotel on the left and the rear of the Feathers Hotel on the right.

The Wynnstay Arms is located on the corner of Charles Street and Yorke Street. The earliest 18th-century parts of the building are on this corner, while its Charles Street side also has a blocked carriage entry. Large parts of the building were demolished and rebuilt in the 1970s with only its Yorke Street façade being retained. The Wynnstay Arms incorporated a former Charles Street hotel known as the Blossoms Hotel, located at its rear at No. 23 Charles Street, but was later made part of the Wynnstay Arms.

== Other buildings ==
No. 14 dates to at least 1650. While the large building on the left side of Charles Street when entering from the High Street was built by Thomas Penson, who lived in it. It served as the offices of the Wrexham Waterworks Company, and by the later 19th century under William Bernie, as a pawnbroker on its ground floor. There is a narrow passage near the building, and between two buildings known as Cutler's Entry, named after the trade practices of the tenant of the house.

No. 18 was a wattle and daub building, dating to at least the 17th century, and is now a taxi office.

Near the end of the street, next to the former Elephant and Castle (see below) and the old Beast Market, is a 1621 timber and thatch building, formerly the Hat Inn, and now an opticians. By the 19th century, this building was neighboured by a half-timbered building between it and Market Street. This neighbouring building later served as a fish and chip shop but was burned down on a Bonfire Night, with the fire spreading to the Hat and seriously damaging its upper floors and roof.

=== Elephant and Castle ===
The Elephant and Castle, was a pub on Charles Street, first recorded in 1788, notorious for its incidents, and poor local reputation. It was described by an 1879 police superintendent as the "greatest curse of Wrexham", as well as the place of the suicide of the father of Annie Chapman, who was later the second victim of Jack the Ripper. Behind the pub was Elephant Yard, which was a crime hotspot, and following its closure the pub was described as the most famous among Wrexham's lost pubs. It lost its license in 1999, later becoming a Thai restaurant. The building is now home to the Magic Dragon Brewery Tap since 2019, which brews its own beer and was named the best pub in Wales in 2023 by CAMRA. A former saw mill was located at its rear.

== History ==
The origin of the name "Charles Street" is unknown, some claim it is named after Charles I, but it only appeared at the earliest by 1788 and on gravestones by the 1830s.

Charles Street was a drovers' road towards Wrexham's Beast Market, which attracted farmers from across the borders region.

The street was previously known as Beast Market Street until the late 18th century, and before that it was considered part of the High Street. By 1620, the land on the northern side of the street was still farmland. Behind Charles Street was the local corporation's original slaughterhouses, near the Beast Market. There is also evidence the street was widened.

In 1998, the street was considerably altered, with new buildings built and it pedestrianised, becoming a "more attractive" compact retail street in the city centre. The street was known for its independent shops by 2011, and in the 2020s was described as a hub for small businesses in Wrexham, including one of the "best cafe[s] in Wales", and multiple salons and barbers. Although in 2011, local traders expressed concerns of public disorder on the street, and called for a dispersal order applied to other parts of central Wrexham to apply to them.
