= Eagles Meadow =

Eagles Meadow Shopping Centre
- Canolfan Siopa Dôl Yr Eryod

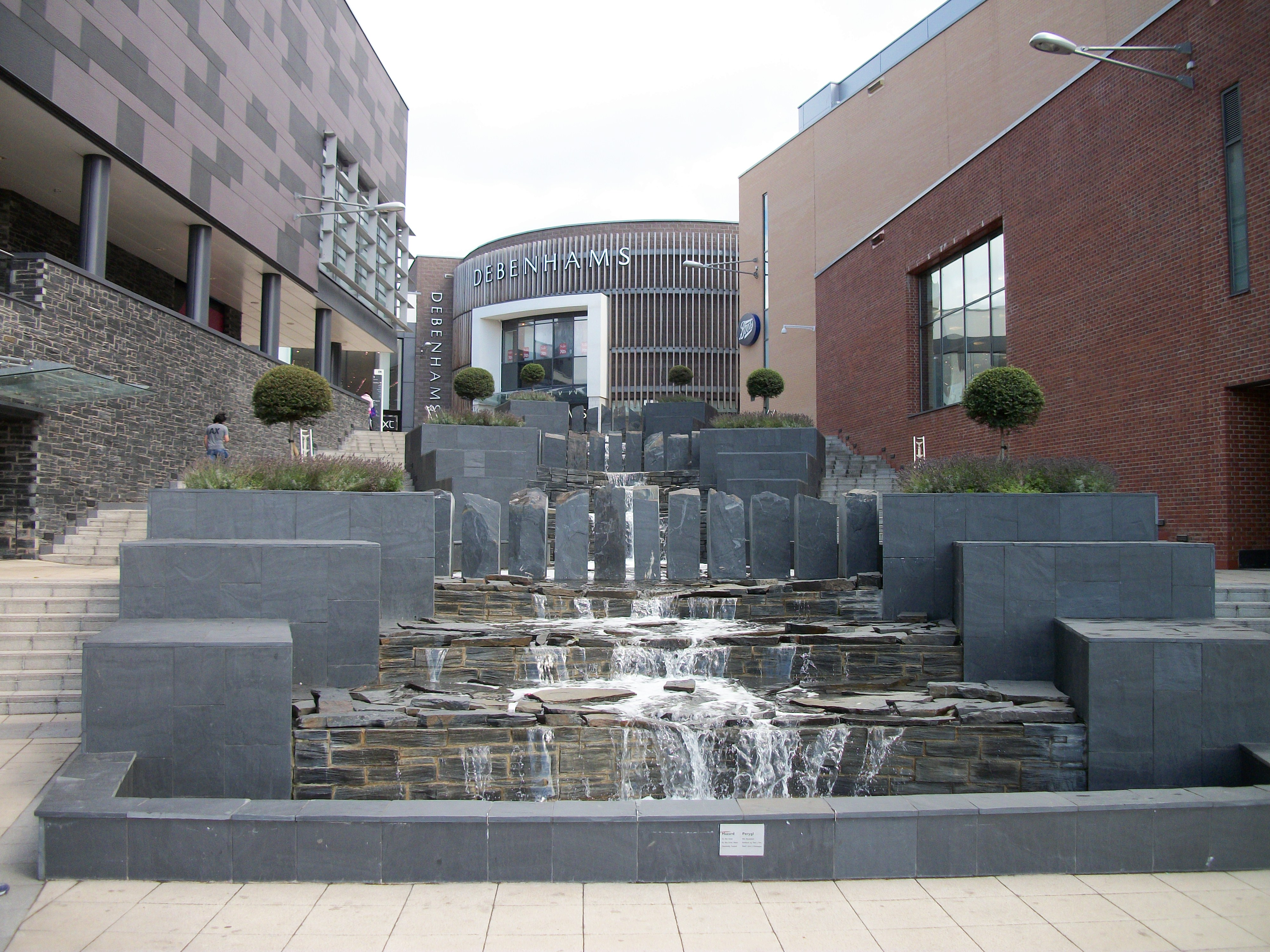
- Eagles Meadow's artificial waterfall in between two sets of stairs, facing north to former anchor store Debenhams.
- Location: Wrexham, Wales
- Coordinates: 53°02′42″N 2°59′18″W
- Opened: 30 October 2008
- Developer: Wilson Bowden
- Owner: Eagles Meadow Shopping Centre LTD
- Num. of stores: 63
- Num. of anchor tenants: 0 (formerly Debenhams until 2021 and M&S until 2023)
- Floor area: 306,000 sq ft (28,400 m^{2})
- Floors: 3
- Parking: 970 spaces
- Website: eagles-meadow.co.uk

Eagles Meadow (Welsh: Dôl Yr Eryod) is a medium-sized shopping centre in Wrexham city centre. The area has had a variety of previous uses, from housing stables for local gentry to its later use as a car park hosting a market. The current shopping centre opened on Thursday 30 October 2008 at 10am.

There is a webcam pointed at the Eagles Meadow bridge hosted by local hyperlocal site Wrexham.com.

== History ==
Used as local gentry's stables.

During World War II, the area was used as a motorpool for elements of the U.S. Army's 83rd Infantry Division.

After the US Army withdrew its forces in Europe after the war, the buildings and treated surface they had created were ideal as a Horse Repository.

In the early 1970s the land was divided between a large urban car park and a small retail development which included a new Asda superstore. A bridge, known locally as the Asda fly-over, was constructed to carry the then town's ring road between Smithfield Road and Salop Road. After these developments, the car park was used as the main weekly market in the town, which moved from St George's Crescent (the original 'Beast Market').

Asda moved to a larger site in September 2000 and the weekly market eventually moved to a new location at the Waterworld car park.

A number of proposals were put forward for re-development of this land (which is close to St. Giles Church). Firstly John Lewis signed up to anchor a retail based development, which included a number of other stores and a supermarket. This development fell through, and the landowner and largest stakeholder Wrexham County Borough Council decided to put the land up for sale by tender.

A large number of tenders were received and in 2003 the winner was chosen as Wilson Bowden in partnership with architects Bernard Engle. The >£100m development includes two large department stores, cafes, bars, restaurants and over 40 other stores. It includes a number of landmark buildings and urban plazas, including a 'Spanish Steps' style area (see Gallery). A number of high rise city style apartments were constructed on the town centre side of the development. Construction began in early 2006 and opened to the public on 30 October 2008.

Controversy surrounded the new build, as several shops already located in the city centre moved to Eagles Meadow and closed their shops in the city centre. However, by 2021, this trend partially reversed, with numerous outlets moving back to larger units in the city centre, notably Sports Direct moving to the Henblas Street redevelopment in the city centre, and chains with multiple sites in Wrexham such as Greggs and Burger King closing their on-site stores whilst maintaining their city centre sites. The centre has since suffered from store closures from 2016 with many citing high business rates (set by the Welsh Government, Wales-wide), increasing in 2020 due to the COVID-19 pandemic in Wales which saw the closure of one of the centre's anchor stores, Debenhams in 2021. Since then there has been an effort by the management of Eagles Meadow to increase the occupancy of the shopping centre with a mix of cafes, nail bar, barbers, gym, community interest groups, independent and national retailers.

== Stores and amenities ==
Stores and other amenities at the centre include: Boots, Clarks, Clintons, Costa Coffee, Eurochange, F. Hinds, Footasylum, Foundry Gym, JD Sports, Next, Odeon Cinema, Pandora, Rebuild with Hope Outlet, River Island, Roman, Tenpin, The Entertainer, The Fragrance Shop and Trespass.

Since 2022, the Centre also hosts the monthly Wrexham Clothing Exchange. In 2023, Wrexham Clothing Exchange set up a Community cafe & venue space at the centre called 'Lle Hapus'

== Gallery ==
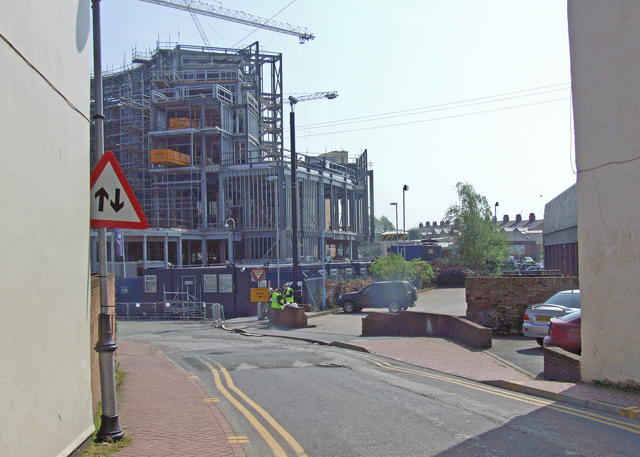
Development (2008)

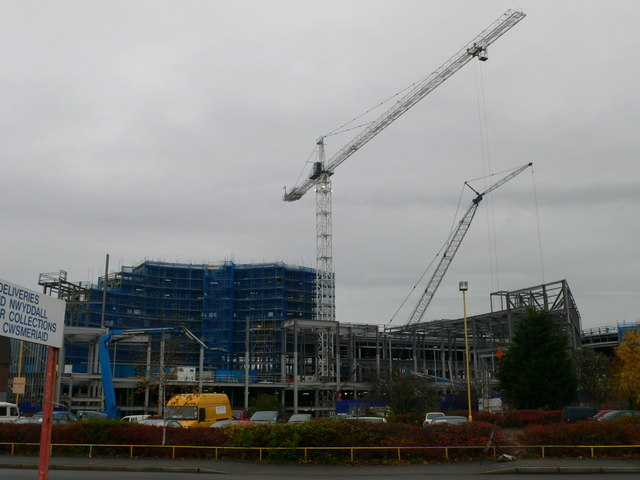
Eagles Meadow under construction

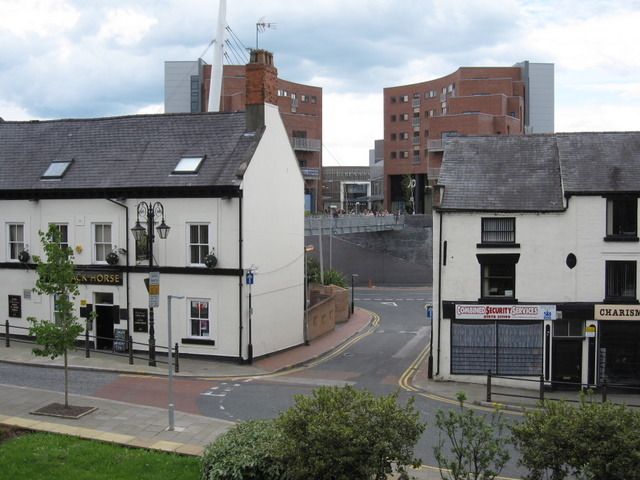
From Temple Row, facing east

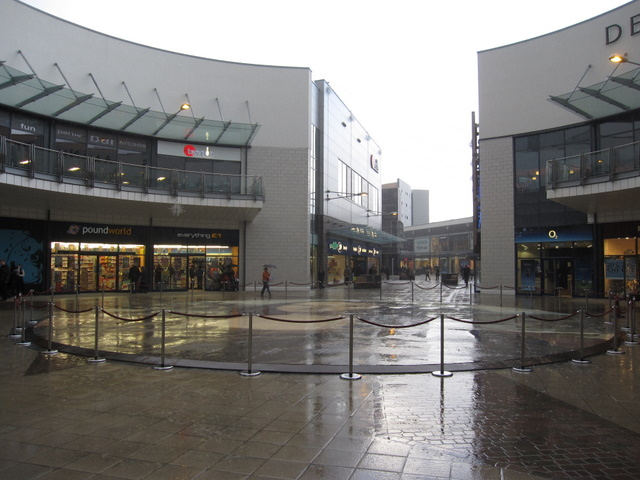
The shopping centre with a floor art piece

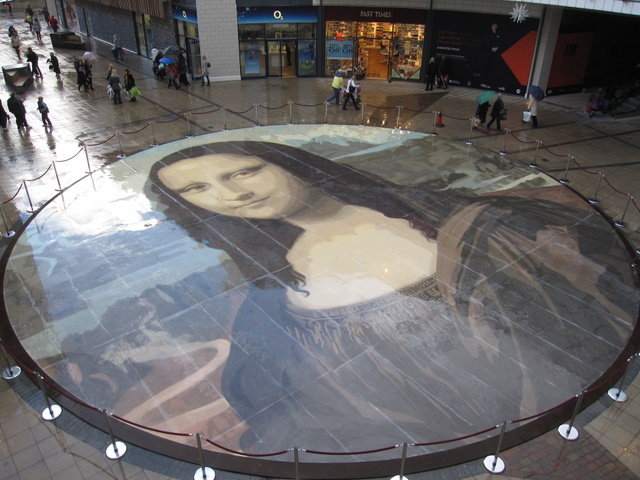
2009 "World's largest Mona Lisa" display at the shopping centre

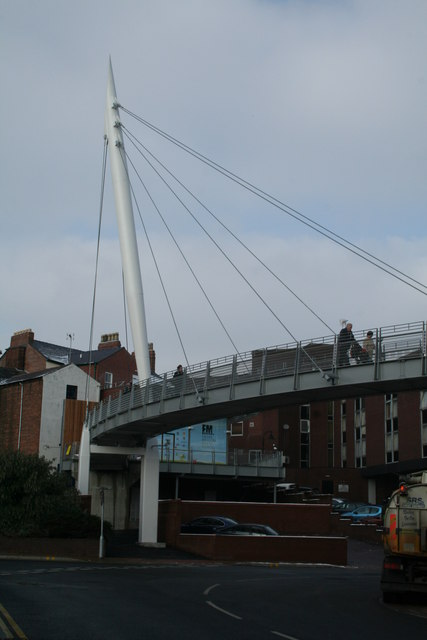
Footbridge connecting to the city centre at Yorke Street.

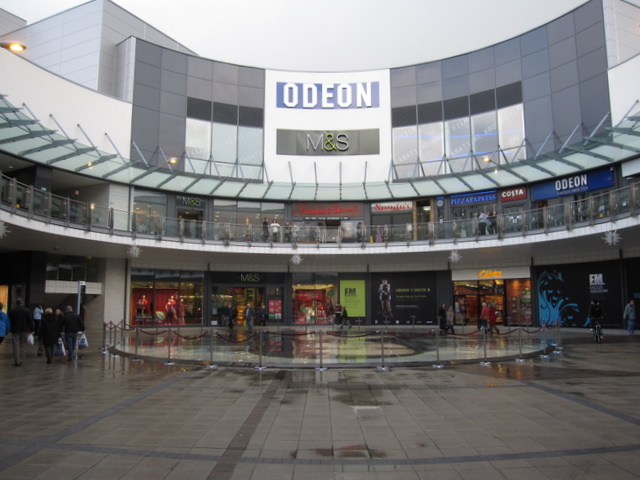
The centre in the day (2009)

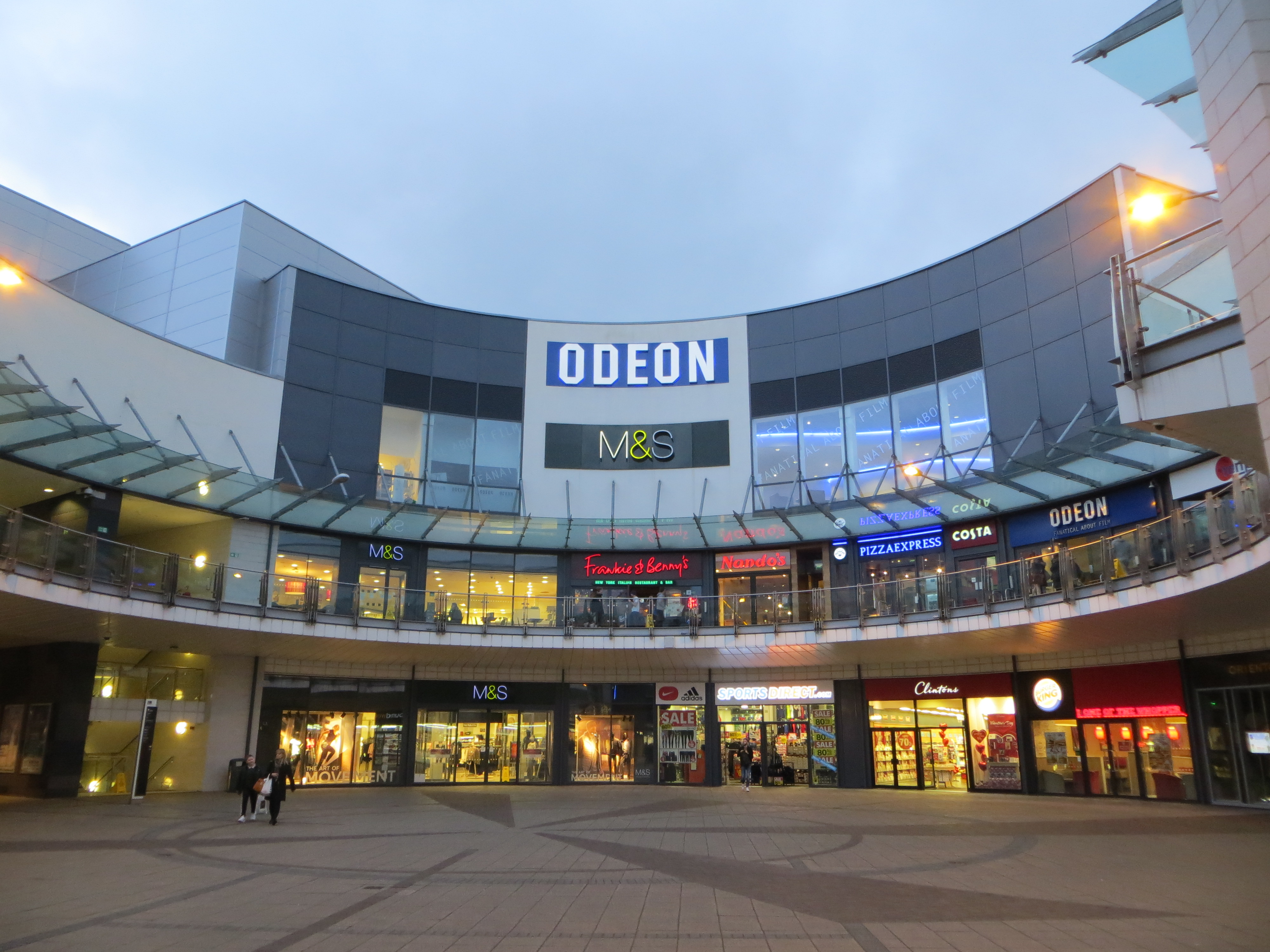
The centre at night (2016)

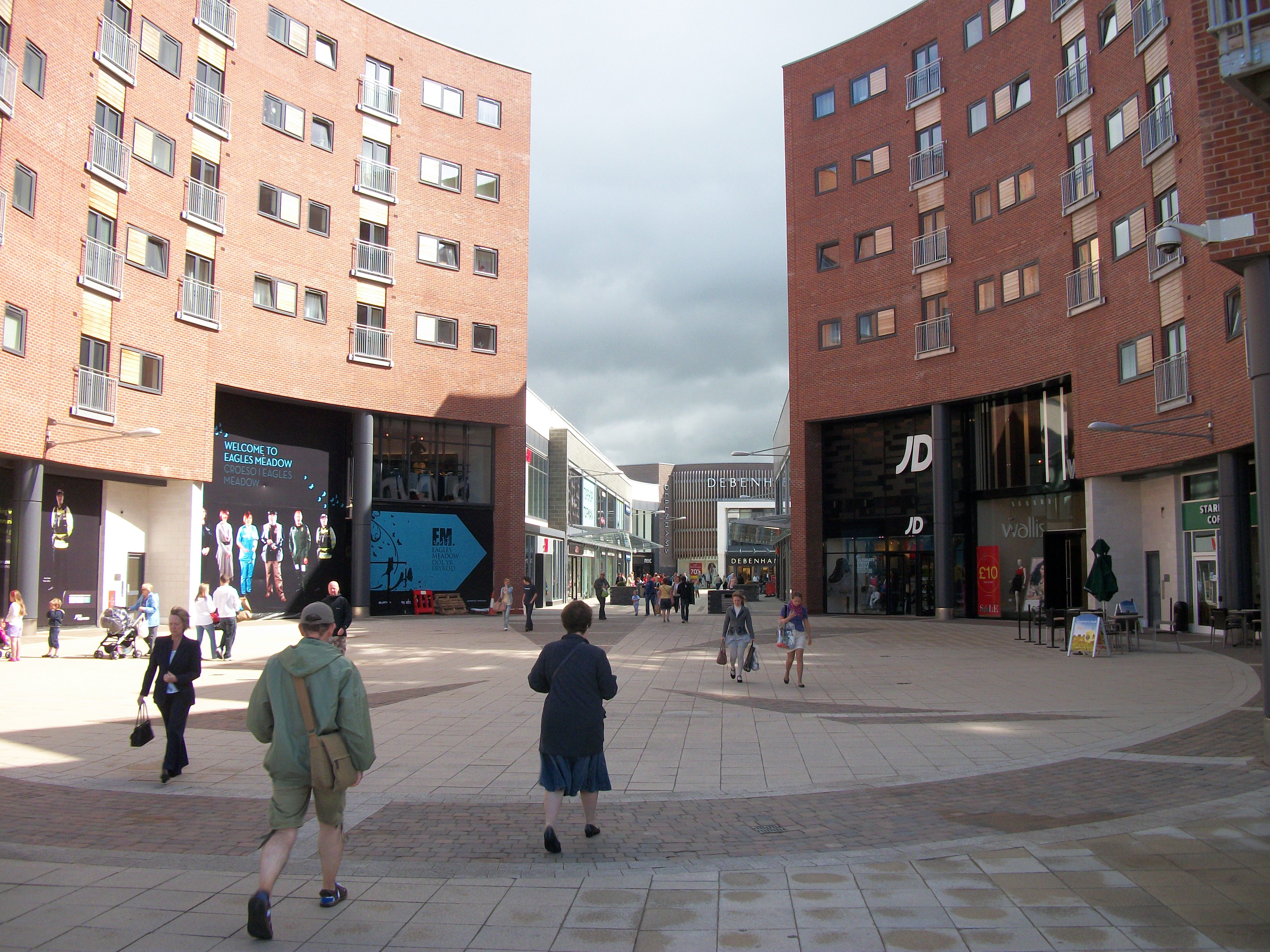
Facing east from the overhead walkway

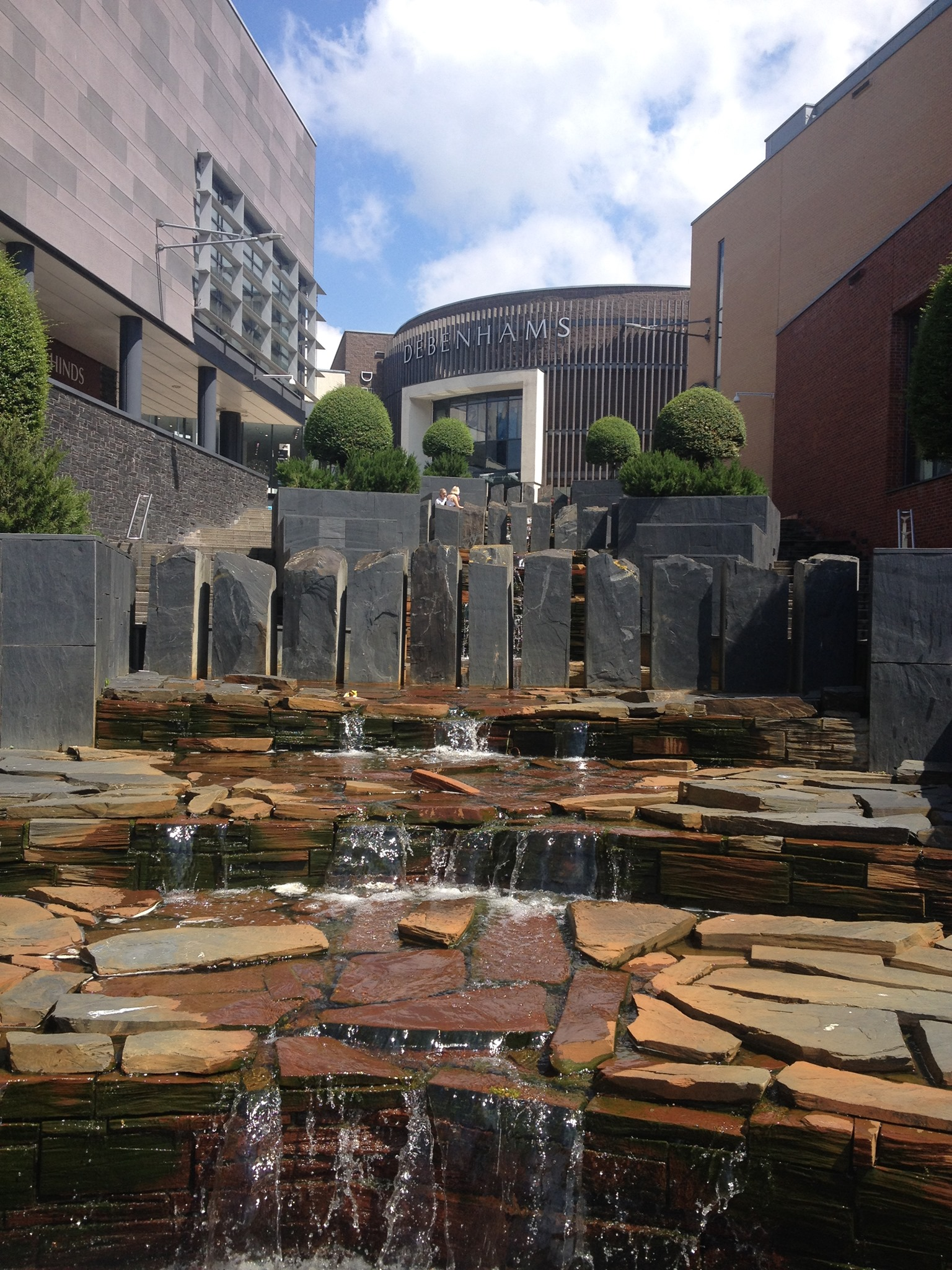
Eagles Meadow 'Spanish Steps' waterfall feature in the afternoon sun. Summer 2021

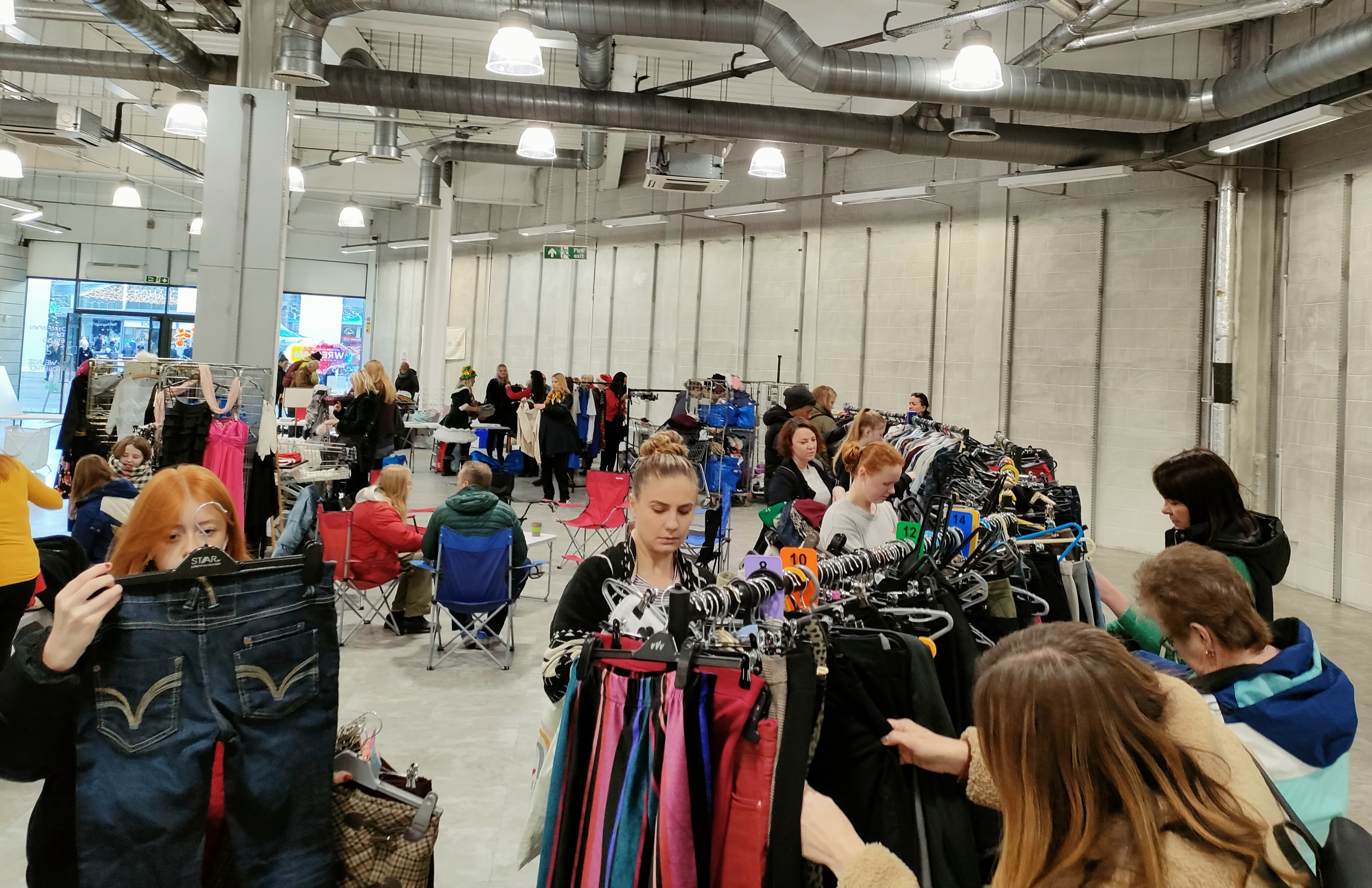
Photo of Monthly Wrexham Clothing Exchange at Eagles Meadow
