= Lists of Marvel Comics publications =

Lists of Marvel Comics publications cover publications by Marvel Comics, a publisher of American comic books and related media. The Walt Disney Company acquired the parent company, Marvel Entertainment, in 2009. The lists are organized alphabetically, by primary character and by imprint.

== Alphabetic list ==
- List of Marvel Comics publications (A)
- List of Marvel Comics publications (B–C)
- List of Marvel Comics publications (D–E)
- List of Marvel Comics publications (F–G)
- List of Marvel Comics publications (H–L)
- List of Marvel Comics publications (M)
- List of Marvel Comics publications (N–R)
- List of Marvel Comics publications (S)
- List of Marvel Comics publications (T–V)
- List of Marvel Comics publications (W–Z)

== By primary character ==
- List of Avengers titles
- List of Captain America titles
- List of Carol Danvers titles
- List of Daredevil titles
- List of Deadpool titles
- List of Hulk titles
- List of Iron Man titles
- List of Nick Fury comics
- List of Punisher titles
- List of Scarlet Witch titles
- List of Spider-Man titles
- List of Storm titles
- List of Thor (Marvel Comics) titles
- List of Venom titles
- List of Wolverine titles

== By imprint ==
- List of Timely and Atlas Comics publications
- List of current Marvel Comics publications
- List of Marvel Digests
- List of All-New, All-Different Marvel publications
- List of Marvel UK publications

== Other ==
- List of What If issues
