= The Infinity Gauntlet (2015 comic book) =

2015 comic book limited series

The Infinity Gauntlet: Warzones (published initially simply as The Infinity Gauntlet) is a five-issue American comic book limited series published by Marvel Comics as part of the 2015 Secret Wars crossover. It was written by Gerry Duggan and drawn by Dustin Weaver. The series was initially published between July 2015 and January 2016 before being collected into a single volume.

The story is set on Battleworld, in a realm where the 2006 Annihilation storyline had an alternate ending.

== Plot ==
The Bakian Clan (a group of humans who survived the attacks of the Annihilation Wave) are shadowed by an unknown figure as they scrounge for food in the ruins of New Xandar, but their dog Zigzag is only able to find canned dog food for them to eat. Later that night, Menzin tells his younger daughter Fayne about how her mother left to reinforce the Nova Corps and will someday return. The elder daughter Anwen believes their mother to be dead as evidenced by the arrival of the Annihilation Wave. An argument between their father and the girls' maternal grandfather ensues which attracts the attention of the bugs forcing the Bakian Clan to flee for their lives. During the resulting chase, Anwen falls into a bug nest. As she fights for her life, she discovers the Mind Infinity Gem. Hearing explosions on the surface, she climbs out and comes face to face with a Nova who removes her helmet, revealing herself to be Anwen's mother as the two then embrace. Anwen's mother says "everything will be alright". Meanwhile, Thanos watching from the shadows in a building disagrees with what he overheard and it is revealed he has the Time Gem.

Eve reunited Anwen with the rest of the Bakian clan and gave each of them Nova suits. After escaping from a horde of bugs by using the Mind Gem Anwen had found, they tried to retreat to the Nova HQ, but found the place wrecked with the Novas stationed there killed and the gem in their possession missing. At the other side of New Xandar, Star-Lord returns to Gamora who is revealed to be the possessor of the gem (the Space Gem) that was on the Nova HQ, having scavenged the HQ and found it between the attack and the Bakians' arrival.

As he had gone back in time to before the Bakian clan reunited with Eve, Thanos posed as an ally, to the point of giving them the Time Gem to earn their trust, and accompanied them in their journey, which remained the same as originally. After finding the ravaged Nova HQ, the Bakian clan and Thanos confronted Star-Lord and Gamora, forcing them to stop fighting by using the Mind Stone. In exchange for three Nova Stars, they acquired the Space Gem. Because they wanted to achieve a common goal, the destruction of the Annihilation Wave, Star-Lord and Gamora joined the Bakian clan and Thanos in their mission. The next gem, the Power Stone, was found being protected by Groot, who gave it to them and joined their party.

Through a vision, Eve was guided by the Stones to Magus City, a sanctuary under the protection of Adam Warlock (wielder of the Soul Stone) who used it to keep the Annihilation Wave at bay. Unbeknown to the Balkian and their allies, Adam also fed on the souls of the inhabitants of the city to power himself and keep the monsters away. When the Balkian were received by Warlock and his Knights of Xandar, Eve went straight to the point and demanded to take the Soul Stone to complete the Infinity Gauntlet and destroy the Annihilation Wave. Warlock opposed Eve leading to a fight for the ownership of the Stone, while the rest of the Balkian Clan and their allies confronted the Knights. Drax the Destroyer (a being bent on hunting down Thanos) interrupted into the battle and demanded the presence of Thanos. The Balkians attacked him, initially believing him to be an enemy. When Warlock used the Soul Stone on Eve to control her, she discovered the full use he gave to the Stone. Thanos tackled Warlock and saved Eve before her soul was consumed and took the Soul Stone for himself. Thanos turned to Eve and seemingly killed her before taking the other four Stones from her and unleashing their power.

Realizing that Thanos has trapped Eve's soul in the Soul Stone, the Bakian Clan attempt to recover the Reality Stone to stand a chance at defeating him. Star-Lord, Gamora, and Groot activate their Nova Stars to engage a Behemoth from the Annihilation Wave, but are apparently killed. Thanos is engaged by a duplicate from a separate timestream, who attempts to wrest control of the gems for himself–as Infinity Stones are only active in their host realities, Thanos easily dispatches his duplicate, but is distracted long enough for the Bakians to claim the Reality Stone. Various family members use the Reality Stone to attempt to kill Thanos (including a Voltron-esque combination of their Nova Armor) but fail. Anwen seemingly presents Thanos with the Reality Stone in exchange for her family's life, but actually has used the Reality Stone to manufacture a "Death Stone" that, when activated, destroys Thanos. She uses the complete Infinity Gauntlet to locate her mother's soul.

== Critical reception ==
The series debuted to positive reviews, averaging a score of 8.3 out of 10 based on 13 reviews according to review aggregator Comic Book Roundup.
