= List of Hulk titles =

The Hulk is a comic book superhero in the Marvel Universe. Since 1962, he has starred in several ongoing series, as well as a large number of limited series, annuals, one-shots and specials. Also, other ongoing series titled Hulk have featured Red Hulk, Amadeus Cho, or Jen Walters as the title character. All stories are published exclusively by Marvel Comics under their standard imprint unless otherwise noted.

== Primary series ==
- Incredible Hulk #1–6 (May 1962 – March 1963)
  - Fantastic Four #12 (March 1963)
  - The Avengers #1–3 (September 1963 – January 1964)
  - Fantastic Four #25–26 (April 1964 – May 1964)
  - The Avengers #5 (May 1964)
  - The Amazing Spider-Man #14 (July 1964)
- Tales to Astonish #59–101 (September 1964 – March 1968)
  - Journey Into Mystery #112 (January 1965)
- Incredible Hulk #102–474 (April 1968 – March 1999)
  - Incredible Hulk #−1 (July 1997)
  - Incredible Hulk Annual #1–20 (1968–1969; 1971–1972; 1976–1986; 1990–1994)
  - Incredible Hulk Annual 1997
  - Incredible Hulk/Sub-Mariner Annual '98
  - X-Man/Incredible Hulk Annual '98
- Hulk #1–11 [#475–485] (April 1999 – February 2000)
  - Hulk #1/2 (Marvel Comics / Wizard Magazine, April 1999)
  - Hulk Annual 1999
- Incredible Hulk (vol. 2) #12–112 [#486–586] (March 2000 – January 2008; series renamed The Incredible Hercules with #112 [cover] or #113 [officially] until #141)
  - Incredible Hulk Annual 2000–2001
- Hulk (vol. 2) #1–12 [#587–598], #13–57 (March 2008 – October 2012; featuring Red Hulk from #13 to #57, series renamed Red She-Hulk with #58 until #67)
- Incredible Hulk #600–611 [#599–610] (September 2009 – October 2010)
- Incredible Hulks #612–635 [#611–634] (November 2010 – October 2011)
  - Incredible Hulks Annual #1 (August 2011)
- Incredible Hulk (vol. 3) #1–15 [#635–649] (December 2011 – December 2012)
- Indestructible Hulk #1–20 [#650–669] (January 2013 – May 2014)
  - Indestructible Hulk Special #1 (December 2013)
  - Indestructible Hulk Annual #2013 (February 2014)
- Hulk (vol. 3) #1–16 [#670–685] (June 2014 – July 2015)
  - Hulk Annual #1 (November 2014)
- Totally Awesome Hulk #1–23 [#686–708] (featuring Amadeus Cho; February 2016 – November 2017)
- Hulk (vol. 4) #1–11 [#148-158] (Jen Walters numbering; February 2017 – December 2017)
- Incredible Hulk #709–717 (December 2017 – July 2018)
- Immortal Hulk #1–50 [#718–767] (August 2018 – December 2021)
  - Immortal Hulk #0 (November 2020)
- Hulk (vol. 5) #1–14 [#768–781] (January 2022 – June 2023)
  - Hulk Annual #1 (July 2023)
- The Incredible Hulk (vol. 4) #1–30 [#782–811] (August 2023 – December 2025)
  - Incredible Hulk Annual #1 (October 2024)
  - Infernal Hulk #1–present (November 2025 – present)

=== Timeline ===
Each horizontal bar shows a reset of numbering, and the last has multiple resets:

== Spin-off series ==
- The Savage She-Hulk #1–25 (February 1980 – February 1982)
- The Sensational She-Hulk #1–60 [#26-85] (May 1989 – February 1994)
- Hulk 2099 #1–10 (December 1994 – September 1995)
- She-Hulk #1–12 [#86-97] (May 2004 – April 2005)
- She-Hulk vol. 2 #1–38 [#98-135] (December 2005 – April 2009)
- The Incredible Hercules #113–141 (February 2008 – April 2010)
- Skaar: Son of Hulk #1–12 (August 2008 – August 2009)
  - Son of Hulk #13–17 (September 2009 – January 2010)
- Red She-Hulk #58–67 (December 2012 – September, 2013)
- She-Hulk (vol. 3) #1–12 [#136-147] (April 2014 – April 2015)
- She-Hulk (vol. 1) (Legacy numbering) #159–163 (January 2018 – May 2018)
- She-Hulk (vol. 4) #1–15 (March 2022 – September 2023)
- The Sensational She-Hulk (vol. 2) #1–10 (December 2023 – November 2024)

== Limited series and one-shots ==
- The Rampaging Hulk #1–9 (January 1977 – June 1978)
- The Hulk! #10–27 (August 1978 – June 1981)
- The Rampaging Hulk (vol. 2) #1–6 (August 1998 – January 1999)
- Batman vs. The Incredible Hulk (April 1982)
- The Incredible Hulk and Wolverine (October 1986)
- The Incredible Hulk and the Thing: The Big Change! (Marvel Graphic Novel No. 29 (May 1987))
- She-Hulk Ceremony #1–2 (October-November 1989)
- Incredible Hulk: Future Imperfect #1–2 (December 1992 – January 1993)
- Incredible Hulk vs. Venom (April 1994)
- Prime vs. The Incredible Hulk #0 (July 1995)
- Cutting Edge – The Hulk:...Ghosts of the Future #1 (December 1995)
- Marvel Edge: The Savage Hulk #1 (January 1996)
- Incredible Hulk/Hercules: Unleashed #1 (October 1996)
- Hulk/Pitt (December 1996)
- Incredible Hulk vs. Superman (July 1999)
- Incredible Hulk: Islands of Adventure (July 1999)
- Sentry/Hulk (February 2001)
- Hulk Smash #1–2 (March–April 2001)
- Startling Stories: Banner #1–4 (July–October 2001)
- Marvel Knights: Wolverine/Hulk #1–4 (April–July 2002)
- Thing/She-Hulk: The Long Night (May 2002)
- Hulk: The End (August 2002)
- Hulk/Wolverine: Six Hours #1–4 (March 2003)
- Incredible Hulk: Nightmerica #1–6 (August 2003 – January 2004)
- Hulk: Gray #1–6 (December 2003 – April 2004)
- Hulk: Gamma Games #1–3 (February–April 2004)
- Hulk: Unchained #1–3 (March–May 2004)
- Darkness/Hulk (July 2004)
- Hulk/Thing: Hard Knocks #1–4 (November 2004 – February 2005)
- Marvel Age: Hulk #1–4 (November 2004 – February 2005)
- What if General Ross had become the Hulk? (February 2005)
- Incredible Hulk: Destruction #1–4 (May–August 2005)
- Captain Universe/The Incredible Hulk (January 2006)
- Ultimate Wolverine vs. Hulk #1–6 (February 2006 – July 2009)
- Planet Hulk: Giant Size Hulk #1 (August 2006)
- Mythos Hulk #1 (October 2006)
- Hulk and Power Pack #1–4 (May–August 2007)
- World War Hulk Prologue: World Breaker #1 (July 2007)
- World War Hulk #1–5 (August 2007 – January 2008)
- World War Hulk: Front Line #1–6 (August–December 2007)
- World War Hulk: X-Men #1–3 (August–October 2007)
- World War Hulk: Gamma Files #0 (August 2007)
- World War Hulk: Gamma Corps #1–4 (September 2007 – January 2008)
- Marvel Adventures: Hulk #1–16 (September 2007 – December 2008)
- What if Planet Hulk (December 2007)
- World War Hulk: AfterSmash! (January 2008)
- World War Hulk – AfterSmash: Warbound #1–5 (February–June 2008)
- World War Hulk – AfterSmash: Damage Control #1–3 (March–May 2008)
- Hulk vs. Fin Fang Foom #1 (February 2008)
- Ultimate Human #1–4 (January–June 2008)
- Hulk vs. Hercules (June 2008)
- Giant Size Incredible Hulk #1 (July 2008)
- Hulk: Raging Thunder #1 (August 2008)
- Monster Size Hulk (December 2008)
- Ultimate Hulk Annual (December 2008)
- Hulk Family: Green Genes (February 2009)
- She-Hulk: Cosmic Collision (February 2009)
- All New Savage She-Hulk #1–4 (June–September 2009)
- X-Men vs. Hulk #1 (March 2009)
- Hulk: Broken Worlds #1–2 (May–July 2009)
- Planet Skaar Prologue (July 2009)
- Skaar: Son of Hulk Presents: The Savage World of Sakaar (November 2009)
- Hulk Team-Up #1 (November 2009)
- What if World War Hulk (February 2010)
- Hulk: Winter Guard #1 (February 2010)
- Fall of the Hulks: Alpha (February 2010)
- Fall of the Hulks: Gamma (February 2010)
- Fall of the Hulks: Red Hulk #1–4 (March–June 2010)
- Fall of the Hulks: Savage She-Hulks #1–3 (May–July 2010)
- Realm of Kings: Son of Hulk #1–4 (April–July 2010)
- Hulk: Let the Battle Begin #1 (May 2010)
- She-Hulk: Sensational (May 2010)
- Incredible Hulks: Enigma Force #1–3 (November 2010 – January 2011)
- She-Hulks #1–4 (January–April 2011)
- Marvel Vault: The Incredible Hulk and the Human Torch (August 2011)
- Fear Itself: Hulk vs. Dracula #1–3 (November–December 2011)
- Hulk Smash Avengers #1–5 (July 2012)
- Hulk: Season One #1 (August 2012)
- Marvel Universe: Hulk and The Agents of Smash #1–4 (December 2013 – March 2014)
- Marvel Knights: Hulk #1–4 (February–May 2014)
- Savage Hulk #1–6 (August 2014 – January 2015)
- Original Sin: Hulk vs. Iron Man #3.1–3.4 (August–October 2014)
- Thanos vs. Hulk #1–4 (February–May 2015)
- Secret Wars – Warzones: Future Imperfect #1–5 (2015)
- Secret Wars – Warzones: Planet Hulk #1–5 (2015)
- The Fallen – Civil War II #1 (October 2016)
- Thor vs. Hulk: Champions of the Universe #1–4 (September – October 2017)
- Generations: Banner Hulk & The Totally Awesome Hulk – The Strongest #1 (October 2017)
- Immortal Hulk: The Best Defense (March 2019)
- Incredible Hulk: Last Call #1 (June 2019)
- Absolute Carnage: Immortal Hulk (December 2019)
- Immortal Hulk: Great Power #1 (March 2020)
- Maestro #1–5 (October 2020 – February 2021)
- Immortal Hulk: The Threshing Place #1 (November 2020)
- Immortal She-Hulk #1 (November 2020)
- King in Black: Immortal Hulk #1 (February 2021)
- Maestro: War and Pax #1–5 (March 2021 – July 2021)
- Immortal Hulk: Flatline #1 (April 2021)
- Immortal Hulk: Time of Monsters #1 (July 2021)
- Maestro: World War M #1–5 (April 2022 – September 2022)
- Hulk: Grand Design - Monster (May 2022)
- Hulk: Grand Design - Madness (April 2022)
- Planet Hulk: Worldbreaker #1–5 (January 2023 – May 2023)
- Joe Fixit #1–5 (March 2023 – July 2023)
- Hulk & Doctor Strange (June 2025)

== Collected editions ==
=== Marvel Masterworks ===
Title	Material collected	Year	ISBN
Volume 1	The Incredible Hulk #1–6; second edition also collects Tales to Astonish #59–62	1989	978-0785111856
Volume 2	Tales to Astonish #59–79	2004	978-0785116547
Volume 3	Tales to Astonish #80–101; The Incredible Hulk #102	2006	978-0785120322
Volume 4	The Incredible Hulk #103–110; The Incredible Hulk Annual #1	2007	978-0785126829
Volume 5	The Incredible Hulk #111–121	2009	978-0785134916
Volume 6	The Incredible Hulk #122–134	2011	978-0785150428
Volume 7	The Incredible Hulk #135–144, The Avengers #88, and Marvel Super-Heroes #16	2013	978-0785166689
Volume 8	The Incredible Hulk #145–156	2014	978-0785188544
Volume 9	The Incredible Hulk #157–170	2015	978-0785191940
Volume 10	The Incredible Hulk #171–183	2016	978-0785195962
Volume 11	The Incredible Hulk #184–196, material from Marvel Treasury Edition #5	2017	978-1302903497
Volume 12	The Incredible Hulk #197–209, The Incredible Hulk Annual #5	2018	978-1302910297
Volume 13	The Incredible Hulk #210–222, The Incredible Hulk Annual #6	2019	978-1302919269
Volume 14	The Incredible Hulk #223–233, The Incredible Hulk Annual #7, Captain America #230	2020	978-1302922306
Volume 15	The Incredible Hulk #234–244, The Incredible Hulk Annual #8–9, material from Marvel Treasury Edition #20, #24	2021	978-1302929398
Volume 16	The Incredible Hulk #245–255, Marvel Treasury Edition #25, material from Marvel Treasury Edition #26,	2022	978-1302933340
Volume 17	Incredible Hulk #256-265, Incredible Hulk Annual #10-11, Marvel Super Hero Contest of Champions #1-3.	2023	978-1302949372
Volume 18	The Incredible Hulk #266–279, and material from Marvel Fanfare #7	2024	978-1302955274
Volume 19	Incredible Hulk #280-291, Incredible Hulk Annual #12 and Incredible Hulk versus Quasimodo #1	2025	978-1302962395

=== Essential Marvel ===
Title	Material collected	Year	ISBN
Volume 1	The Incredible Hulk #1–6; Tales to Astonish #60–91	1999	978-0785123743
Volume 2	Tales to Astonish #92–101; The Incredible Hulk #102–117, The Incredible Hulk Annual #1	2001	978-0785107958
Volume 3	Incredible Hulk #118–142; Captain Marvel #20–21; The Avengers #88	2005	978-0785116899
Volume 4	The Incredible Hulk #143–170	2006	978-0785121930
Volume 5	The Incredible Hulk #171–200, The Incredible Hulk Annual #5	2008	978-0785130659
Volume 6	The Incredible Hulk #201–225, The Incredible Hulk Annual #6	2010	978-0785145400
Volume 7	The Incredible Hulk #226–248, The Incredible Hulk Annual #7–9, Captain America #232	2013	978-0785185116

=== Marvel Epic Collection ===
#	Subtitle	Years covered	Issues collected	Writers	Artists	Pages	Released	ISBN
1	Man Or Monster?	1962-1965	Incredible Hulk #1–6; Fantastic Four #12, 25–26; Avengers #1–3, 5; Amazing Spider-Man #14; Tales to Astonish #59; Journey into Mystery #112	Stan Lee	Jack Kirby	392	15 Jun 2016	978-0785196006
1	Man Or Monster?	1962-1965	Incredible Hulk #1–6; Fantastic Four #12, 25–26; Avengers #1–3, 5; Amazing Spider-Man #14; Tales to Astonish #59; Journey into Mystery #112	Stan Lee	Jack Kirby	392	23 Jun 2021	978-1302929749
1	Man Or Monster?	1962-1965	Incredible Hulk #1–6; Fantastic Four #12, 25–26; Avengers #1–3, 5; Amazing Spider-Man #14; Tales to Astonish #59; Journey into Mystery #112	Stan Lee	Jack Kirby	392	17 Sep 2024	978-1302960438
2	The Hulk Must Die	1964-1967	Tales to Astonish #60–96; material from Not Brand Echh #3	Stan Lee	Steve Ditko, Jack Kirby, Bill Everett, Gil Kane, John Buscema, Marie Severin	432	25 Oct 2017	978-1302904456
3	The Leader Lives	1967-1969	Tales to Astonish #97–101, Incredible Hulk (vol. 2) #102–117, Annual #1; material from Not Brand Echh #9	Stan Lee, Gary Friedrich	Marie Severin, Herb Trimpe	488	31 Oct 2018	978-1302913137
4	In The Hands Of HYDRA	1969-1971	Incredible Hulk (vol. 2) #118–137; Marvel Super-Heroes #16	Roy Thomas	Herb Trimpe	440	25 Sep 2019	978-1302915582
5	Who Will Judge The Hulk?	1971-1972	Incredible Hulk (vol. 2) #138-156; Avengers #88	Roy Thomas, Archie Goodwin	Herb Trimpe	448	19 Jan 2021	978-1302922061
6	Crisis On Counter-Earth	1972-1974	Incredible Hulk (vol. 2) #157-178	Steve Englehart, Roy Thomas, Gerry Conway	Herb Trimpe	472	5 Oct 2021	978-1302929169
7	And Now... The Wolverine	1974-1976	Incredible Hulk (vol. 2) #179-200; Incredible Hulk Annual #5	Len Wein	Herb Trimpe, Sal Buscema	472	4 Oct 2022	978-1302933609
8	The Curing Of Dr. Banner	1976-1978	Incredible Hulk (vol. 2) #201-226, Annual #6	Len Wein, Roger Stern	Sal Buscema	528	24 Oct 2023	978-1302948795
9	Kill Or Be Killed	1978-1980	Incredible Hulk (vol. 2) #227-244, Annual #7-9, Captain America #230	Roger Stern	Sal Buscema	520	30 Jul 2024	978-1302955366
10	To Hunt the Hulk	1980-1981	Incredible Hulk #245-262; Marvel Treasury Edition #25	Bill Mantlo	Sal Buscema, Herb Trimpe	488	Nov 4, 2025	978-1302960582
11	Devolution	1981-1983	Incredible Hulk #263-279, Annual 10–11; Incredible Hulk vs Quasimodo	Bill Mantlo	Sal Buscema	496	May 5, 2026	978-1302967413
12	Unholy Alliance	1983-1984	Incredible Hulk #280-296; Annual #12; Questprobe #1	Bill Mantlo	Sal Buscema	TBA	Feb 2027	Incredible Hulk cover
13	Crossroads	1984-1985	Incredible Hulk (vol. 2) #297-313, Incredible Hulk Annual #13, Alpha Flight #29	Bill Mantlo	Sal Buscema, Bret Blevins, Mike Mignola, Alan Kupperberg	488	19 Apr 2022	978-1302934491
14	Going Gray	1985-1987	Incredible Hulk (vol. 2) #314-330, Annual #14-15; material from Marvel Fanfare #29	Al Milgrom, John Byrne	John Byrne, Steve Geiger, Sal Buscema	512	15 Dec 2020	978-1302926762
15	Ground Zero	1987-1988	Incredible Hulk (vol. 2) #331-346; Marvel Graphic Novel No. 29 - The Incredible Hulk and the Thing: The Big Change	Peter David, Jim Starlin	Todd McFarlane, Berni Wrightson	464	20 Aug 2024	978-1302956325
16	Joe Fixit	1988-1989	Incredible Hulk #347–363; Web of Spider-Man #44; Fantastic Four 320; material from Marvel Comics Presents 26, 45;	Peter David		TBA	Jan 2027	Incredible Hulk #347
19	Ghost Of The Past	1992-1993	Incredible Hulk (vol. 2) #397–406, Annual #18–19; material from Namor the Sub-Mariner Annual #2, Silver Surfer Annual #5, Doctor Strange, Sorcerer Supreme Annual #2 and Marvel Holiday Special #2	Peter David, Ron Marz	Dale Keown, Jan Duursema, Gary Frank	480	16 Sep 2015	978-0785192992
20	Future Imperfect	1992-1994	Incredible Hulk (vol. 2) #407–419, Annual #20, Ashcan Edition; Incredible Hulk: Future Imperfect #1–2; material from Marvel Holiday Special #3	Peter David	Gary Frank, Paul Pelletier, George Perez, Roger Cruz	504	4 Jan 2017	978-1302904708
20	Future Imperfect	1992-1994	Incredible Hulk (vol. 2) #407–419, Annual #20, Ashcan Edition; Incredible Hulk: Future Imperfect #1–2; material from Marvel Holiday Special #3	Peter David	Gary Frank, Paul Pelletier, George Perez, Roger Cruz	504	22 Oct 2024	978-1302960445
21	Fall Of The Pantheon	1994-1995	Incredible Hulk (vol. 2) #420–435; Tales to Astonish (vol. 2) #1; Incredible Hulk vs. Venom #1	Peter David	John Estes, Gary Frank, Darick Robertson, Liam Sharp	496	10 Jan 2018	978-1302910242
21	Fall Of The Pantheon	1994-1995	Incredible Hulk (vol. 2) #420–435; Tales to Astonish (vol. 2) #1; Incredible Hulk vs. Venom #1	Peter David	John Estes, Gary Frank, Darick Robertson, Liam Sharp	496	9 Nov 2022	978-1302946906
22	Ghosts Of The Future	1995-1996	Incredible Hulk (vol. 2) #436–448; Savage Hulk #1; Cutting Edge #1; Cable #34; Onslaught: Marvel Universe	Peter David, William Messner-Loebs, Mark Waid	Angel Medina, Adam Kubert, Mike Deodato Jr.	504	16 Jan 2019	978-1302916268
24	The Lone And Level Sands	1998-1999	Incredible Hulk (vol. 2) #460-474; Incredible Hulk/Sub-Mariner Annual 1998, X-Man/Hulk Annual 1998	Peter David, Joe Casey	Adam Kubert, David Brewer, Javier Pulido, Ed McGuinness	464	18 Apr 2023	978-1302951061

=== Marvel Modern Epic Collection ===
#	Subtitle	Years covered	Issues collected	Writers	Artists	Pages	Released	ISBN
6	Who Is The Red Hulk?	2007-2009	Hulk (vol. 2) #1-12; King-Size Hulk #1; material from Incredible Hulk #600, Wolverine (vol. 3) #50	Jeph Loeb	Ed McGuinness, Arthur Adams, Frank Cho, Herb Trimpe	440	7 May 2024	978-1302956479
7	Code Red	2009	Hulk (vol. 2) #13-18; Incredible Hulk #601-605; Dark Reign: The List - Hulk; material from Incredible Hulk #600	Jeph Loeb, Greg Pak, Fred Van Lente	Ed McGuinness, Ian Churchill, Whilce Portacio, Ariel Olivetti, Giuseppe Camuncoli, Ben Oliver, Michael Ryan	416	Jan 20, 2026	978-1302966058
8	Fall Of The Hulks	2009-2012	Hulk (vol. 2) #19-21; Incredible Hulk #606-608; Fall Of The Hulks: Alpha; Fall Of The Hulks: Gamma; Fall Of The Hulks: Red Hulk #1-4; Fall Of The Hulks: Save She-Hulks #1-3; Fall Of The Hulks: MODOK	TBC	TBC	TBC	Nov 2026	TBC

=== Marvel Omnibus ===
#	Title	Years covered	Material collected	Pages	Released	ISBN
1	The Incredible Hulk Vol. 1	1962-1968	The Incredible Hulk #1–6; Tales to Astonish #59–101; The Incredible Hulk (1968) #102	752	25 Jun 2008	Jack Kirby cover: 978-0785129387
1	The Incredible Hulk Vol. 1	1962-1968	The Incredible Hulk #1–6; Tales to Astonish #59–101; The Incredible Hulk (1968) #102	752	25 Jun 2008	Alex Ross DM cover: 978-0785130567
1	The Incredible Hulk Vol. 1	1962-1968	Material from Not Brand Echh (1967) #3, 9	792	9 Mar 2022	Alex Ross cover: 978-1302933869
1	The Incredible Hulk Vol. 1	1962-1968	Material from Not Brand Echh (1967) #3, 9	792	9 Mar 2022	Jack Kirby DM cover: 978-1302933876
2	The Incredible Hulk Vol. 2	1968-1970	Incredible Hulk (1968) #103-134, Annual (1968) #1	832	21 Nov 2023	Herb Trimpe cover: 978-1302950286
2	The Incredible Hulk Vol. 2	1968-1970	Incredible Hulk (1968) #103-134, Annual (1968) #1	832	21 Nov 2023	Jim Steranko DM cover: 978-1302950293
3	The Incredible Hulk Vol. 3	1970-1974	The Incredible Hulk (vol. 2) #135–170; Avengers #88; Marvel Super Heroes #16	912	11 Nov 2025	Herb Trimpe Doom cover: 978-1302962593
3	The Incredible Hulk Vol. 3	1970-1974	The Incredible Hulk (vol. 2) #135–170; Avengers #88; Marvel Super Heroes #16	912	11 Nov 2025	Herb Trimpe Judge DM cover: 978-1302962609
4	The Incredible Hulk Vol. 4	1974-1977	The Incredible Hulk (vol. 2) #171–209; Annual #5; Material from Marvel Treasury Edition #5	880	23 Feb 2027	Rich Buckler Cover
4	The Incredible Hulk Vol. 4	1974-1977	The Incredible Hulk (vol. 2) #171–209; Annual #5; Material from Marvel Treasury Edition #5	880	23 Feb 2027	Herb Trimpe Wolverine DM Cover
1	Incredible Hulk by Peter David Vol. 1	1987-1990	Incredible Hulk (vol. 2) #328, 331–368; Web of Spider-Man #44, Fantastic Four #320, material from Marvel Comics Presents #26 and 45	1,008	28 Jan 2020	Steve Geiger cover: 978-1302921422
1	Incredible Hulk by Peter David Vol. 1	1987-1990	Incredible Hulk (vol. 2) #328, 331–368; Web of Spider-Man #44, Fantastic Four #320, material from Marvel Comics Presents #26 and 45	1,008	28 Jan 2020	Steve Geiger Gray Hulk DM cover: 978-1302921552
2	Incredible Hulk by Peter David Vol. 2	1990-1992	Incredible Hulk (vol. 2) #369–400, Annual #16–18; X-Factor (1986) #76; material from Marvel Holiday Special (1991) #2	1,048	10 Nov 2020	Dale Keown Hulk vs Hulk cover: 978-1302927271
2	Incredible Hulk by Peter David Vol. 2	1990-1992	Incredible Hulk (vol. 2) #369–400, Annual #16–18; X-Factor (1986) #76; material from Marvel Holiday Special (1991) #2	1,048	10 Nov 2020	Dale Keown Bruce Banner DM cover: 978-1302927288
2	Incredible Hulk by Peter David Vol. 2	1990-1992	Incredible Hulk (vol. 2) #369–400, Annual #16–18; X-Factor (1986) #76; material from Marvel Holiday Special (1991) #2	1,048	24 Jan 2023	Dale Keown Hulk vs Hulk cover: 9781302945336
2	Incredible Hulk by Peter David Vol. 2	1990-1992	Incredible Hulk (vol. 2) #369–400, Annual #16–18; X-Factor (1986) #76; material from Marvel Holiday Special (1991) #2	1,048	24 Jan 2023	Dale Keown Bruce Banner DM cover: 978-1302945329
3	Incredible Hulk by Peter David Vol. 3	1992-1995	Incredible Hulk (vol. 2) #401–435, Annual #19–20; Incredible Hulk vs. Venom #1; Hulk: Future Imperfect #1–2; Tales to Astonish (1994) #1; Incredible Hulk Ashcan Edition; material from Marvel Holiday Special (1991) #3	1,200	12 May 2021	Gary Frank Hulk cover: 978-1302929145
3	Incredible Hulk by Peter David Vol. 3	1992-1995	Incredible Hulk (vol. 2) #401–435, Annual #19–20; Incredible Hulk vs. Venom #1; Hulk: Future Imperfect #1–2; Tales to Astonish (1994) #1; Incredible Hulk Ashcan Edition; material from Marvel Holiday Special (1991) #3	1,200	12 May 2021	Gary Frank Troyjan War DM cover: 978-1302929152
4	Incredible Hulk by Peter David Vol. 4	1995-1998	Incredible Hulk (vol. 2) #436–467, -1, Annual '97; Savage Hulk (1996) #1; Cutting Edge (1995) #1; Cable (1993) #34; Onslaught: Marvel Universe (1996) #1; Incredible Hulk: Hercules Unleashed (1996) #1; Heroes Reborn: The Return (1997) #1–4	1,248	24 May 2022	Mike Deodato cover: 978-1302932916
4	Incredible Hulk by Peter David Vol. 4	1995-1998	Incredible Hulk (vol. 2) #436–467, -1, Annual '97; Savage Hulk (1996) #1; Cutting Edge (1995) #1; Cable (1993) #34; Onslaught: Marvel Universe (1996) #1; Incredible Hulk: Hercules Unleashed (1996) #1; Heroes Reborn: The Return (1997) #1–4	1,248	24 May 2022	Adam Kubert DM cover: 978-1302932923
5	Incredible Hulk by Peter David Vol. 5	2002-2022	Incredible Hulk: The End #1; What If General Ross Had Become The Hulk? #1; Incredible Hulk (2000) #77–87; Hulk: Destruction (2005) #1–4; Hulk vs. Fin Fang Foom (2007) #1; Marvel Adventures: Hulk (2007) #13–16; Incredible Hulk: Last Call (2019) #1; Symbiote Spider-Man: Crossroads (2021) #1–5; New Fantastic Four (2022) #1–5; material from Giant-Size Hulk (2006) #1; World War Hulk Prologue: World Breaker (2007) #1; Hulk Monster-Size Special #1 and Breaking Into Comics the Marvel Way (2010) #2	904	16 May 2023	Lee Weeks cover: 978-1302950965
5	Incredible Hulk by Peter David Vol. 5	2002-2022	Incredible Hulk: The End #1; What If General Ross Had Become The Hulk? #1; Incredible Hulk (2000) #77–87; Hulk: Destruction (2005) #1–4; Hulk vs. Fin Fang Foom (2007) #1; Marvel Adventures: Hulk (2007) #13–16; Incredible Hulk: Last Call (2019) #1; Symbiote Spider-Man: Crossroads (2021) #1–5; New Fantastic Four (2022) #1–5; material from Giant-Size Hulk (2006) #1; World War Hulk Prologue: World Breaker (2007) #1; Hulk Monster-Size Special #1 and Breaking Into Comics the Marvel Way (2010) #2	904	16 May 2023	Dale Keown DM cover: 978-1302950972
	Hulk: Maestro by Peter David	1992-2022	Hulk: Future Imperfect (1992) #1–2, Abominations (1996) #1–3, Incredible Hulk (1968) #460–461, Captain Marvel (1999) #27–30, Exiles (2001) #79–80, Spider-Man 2099 (2014) #9–10, Future Imperfect (2015) #1–5, Maestro (2020) #1–5, Maestro: War and Pax (2021) #1–5, Maestro: World War M (2022) #1–5; material from Hulk: Broken Worlds (2009) #1 and Secret Wars: Battleworld (2015) #4	960	19 Sep 2023	George Perez cover: 978-1302951139
	Hulk: Maestro by Peter David	1992-2022	Hulk: Future Imperfect (1992) #1–2, Abominations (1996) #1–3, Incredible Hulk (1968) #460–461, Captain Marvel (1999) #27–30, Exiles (2001) #79–80, Spider-Man 2099 (2014) #9–10, Future Imperfect (2015) #1–5, Maestro (2020) #1–5, Maestro: War and Pax (2021) #1–5, Maestro: World War M (2022) #1–5; material from Hulk: Broken Worlds (2009) #1 and Secret Wars: Battleworld (2015) #4	960	19 Sep 2023	Greg Land DM cover: 978-1302951146
	Incredible Hulk by Byrne & Casey	1998-2000	Incredible Hulk (1968) #468-474; Hulk (1999) #1-11; Hulk & Sub-Mariner Annual '98; X-Man & Hulk Annual '98; Hulk Annual '99; Rampaging Hulk (1998) #1-6	768	28 May 2024	Ron Garney cover: 978-1302954062
	Incredible Hulk by Byrne & Casey	1998-2000	Incredible Hulk (1968) #468-474; Hulk (1999) #1-11; Hulk & Sub-Mariner Annual '98; X-Man & Hulk Annual '98; Hulk Annual '99; Rampaging Hulk (1998) #1-6	768	28 May 2024	Lee Weeks DM cover: 978-1302954079
	Incredible Hulk: Return Of The Monster	2001-2004	Incredible Hulk (vol. 2) #34-76; Hulk/Wolverine: Six Hours #1-4; Hulk/Thing: Hard Knocks #1-4	1,264	5 May 2026	Kaare Andrews cover: 978-1302966478
	Incredible Hulk: Return Of The Monster	2001-2004	Incredible Hulk (vol. 2) #34-76; Hulk/Wolverine: Six Hours #1-4; Hulk/Thing: Hard Knocks #1-4	1,264	5 May 2026	Mike Deodato Jr. DM cover: 978-1302966485
	Hulk: Planet Hulk	2005-2007	Fantastic Four #533–535; Incredible Hulk (2000) #88–105, Giant-Size Hulk (2006) #1; What If? Planet Hulk; Planet Hulk Guidebook; material from New Avengers: Illuminati #1 and Amazing Fantasy (2004) #15	656	19 Sep 2017	Jose Ladronn Portrait cover: 978-1302907693
	Hulk: Planet Hulk	2005-2007	Fantastic Four #533–535; Incredible Hulk (2000) #88–105, Giant-Size Hulk (2006) #1; What If? Planet Hulk; Planet Hulk Guidebook; material from New Avengers: Illuminati #1 and Amazing Fantasy (2004) #15	656	14 Feb 2023	Jose Ladronn Portrait cover: 978-1302949686
	Hulk: Planet Hulk	2005-2007	Fantastic Four #533–535; Incredible Hulk (2000) #88–105, Giant-Size Hulk (2006) #1; What If? Planet Hulk; Planet Hulk Guidebook; material from New Avengers: Illuminati #1 and Amazing Fantasy (2004) #15	656	14 Feb 2023	Jose Ladronn Arena DM cover: 978-1302949693
	Hulk: World War Hulk	2007	World War Hulk Prologue: World Breaker; World War Hulk #1–5; Incredible Hulk (2000) #106–111; Iron Man (2005) #19–20; Avengers: The Initiative #4–5; Irredeemable Ant-Man #10; World War Hulk: X-Men #1–3; Ghost Rider (2006) #12–13; Heroes for Hire (2006) #11–15; Punisher War Journal (2007) #12; World War Hulk: Gamma Corps #1–4; World War Hulk: Frontline #1–6; World War Hulk Aftersmash: One-Shot; World War Hulk Aftersmash: Damage Control #1–3; World War Hulk Aftersmash: Warbound #1–5; Planet Hulk Saga	1,304	17 Oct 2017	David Finch Throne cover: 978-1302908126
	Hulk: World War Hulk	2007		1,304	28 May 2024	David Finch Throne cover: 978-1302957674
	Hulk: World War Hulk	2007		1,304	28 May 2024	Michael Turner Earth's Heroes DM cover: 978-1302957681
	Hulk by Loeb and McGuinness	2007-2011	Hulk (2008) #1–24; King-Size Hulk #1; Fall of the Hulks: Gamma #1; Hulk-Sized Mini-Hulks #1; material from Incredible Hulk (vol. 2) #600 and Wolverine (2003) #50	912	12 Jun 2019	Ed McGuinness cover: 978-1302918057
	Immortal Hulk	2018-2021	Immortal Hulk (2018) #1–50; Immortal Hulk: The Best Defense (2018) #1; Defenders: The Best Defense (2018) #1; Absolute Carnage: The Immortal Hulk (2019) #1; Immortal Hulk (2020) #0; Empyre: The Immortal She-Hulk (2020) #1; King in Black: The Immortal Hulk (2020) #1; Gamma Flight (2021) #1–5; Immortal Hulk: Time of Monsters (2021) #1 (A-story); material from Avengers (2018) #684	1,616	15 Aug 2023	Alex Ross Chain Breaker cover: 978-1302949976
	Immortal Hulk	2018-2021	Immortal Hulk (2018) #1–50; Immortal Hulk: The Best Defense (2018) #1; Defenders: The Best Defense (2018) #1; Absolute Carnage: The Immortal Hulk (2019) #1; Immortal Hulk (2020) #0; Empyre: The Immortal She-Hulk (2020) #1; King in Black: The Immortal Hulk (2020) #1; Gamma Flight (2021) #1–5; Immortal Hulk: Time of Monsters (2021) #1 (A-story); material from Avengers (2018) #684	1,616	15 Aug 2023	Alex Ross Portrait DM cover: 978-1302950620
	Hulk by Cates & Ottley	2021-2023	Hulk (2021) #1-14; Free Comic Book Day 2021: Avengers/Hulk #1 (Hulk story); Hulk vs. Thor: Banner of War Alpha (2022) #1; Thor (2020) #25 (A story), 26	424	12 Nov 2024	Ryan Ottley Claw cover: 978-1302958558
	Hulk by Cates & Ottley	2021-2023	Hulk (2021) #1-14; Free Comic Book Day 2021: Avengers/Hulk #1 (Hulk story); Hulk vs. Thor: Banner of War Alpha (2022) #1; Thor (2020) #25 (A story), 26	424	12 Nov 2024	Ryan Ottley Smash DM cover: 978-1302958572

=== Other collections ===
==== The Incredible Hulk vol. 1 ====
Title	Material collected	Year	ISBN
The Incredible Hulk: Beauty and the Behemoth	The Incredible Hulk #1,169, 319, 344, 372, 377, 466	1998	978-0785106593
Hulk: Heart of the Atom	The Incredible Hulk #140, 148, 156, 202–203, 205–207, 246–248; What If? #23	2008	978-0785130871
The Incredible Hulk: Pardoned	The Incredible Hulk #269–285	2012	978-0785162087
The Incredible Hulk: Regression	The Incredible Hulk #286–295, 297–300, The Incredible Hulk Annual #12 and material from The Incredible Hulk #296	2012	978-0785162599
The Incredible Hulk: Crossroads	The Incredible Hulk #301–313, The Incredible Hulk Annual #13, Alpha Flight #29	2013	978-0785184485
Hulk Visionaries: John Byrne	The Incredible Hulk #314–319, The Incredible Hulk Annual #14; Marvel Fanfare #29	2008	978-0785127055
The Incredible Hulk: Ground Zero	The Incredible Hulk #340–346	1991	978-0871357922
Hulk Visionaries: Peter David, vol. 1	The Incredible Hulk #331–339	2005	978-0785115410
Hulk Visionaries: Peter David, vol. 2	The Incredible Hulk #340–348	2005	978-0785118787
Hulk Visionaries: Peter David, vol. 3	The Incredible Hulk #349–354; Web of Spider-Man #44; Fantastic Four #320	2006	978-0785120957
Hulk Visionaries: Peter David, vol. 4	The Incredible Hulk #355–363; Marvel Comics Presents #26, #45	2007	978-0785120964
Hulk Visionaries: Peter David, vol. 5	The Incredible Hulk #364–372, The Incredible Hulk Annual #16	2008	978-0785127574
Hulk Visionaries: Peter David, vol. 6	The Incredible Hulk #373–382	2009	978-0785137627
Hulk Visionaries: Peter David, vol. 7	The Incredible Hulk #383–389, The Incredible Hulk Annual #17	2010	978-0785144571
Hulk Visionaries: Peter David, vol. 8	The Incredible Hulk #390–396, The Incredible Hulk Annual #18; X-Factor #76	2011	978-0785156031

==== Hulk vol. 1 & The Incredible Hulk vol. 2 ====
Title	Material collected	Year	ISBN
Hulk by John Byrne & Ron Garney	Hulk #1–11, Hulk Annual #1999	2012	978-0785158561
Incredible Hulk: Dogs of War	The Incredible Hulk (vol. 2) #12–20	2001	978-0785107903
Incredible Hulk: Past Perfect	The Incredible Hulk (vol. 2) #21–33, The Incredible Hulk Annual #2001	2012	978-0785162148
Incredible Hulk vol. 1: Return of the Monster	The Incredible Hulk (vol. 2) #34–39	2002	978-0785109433
Incredible Hulk vol. 2: Boiling Point	The Incredible Hulk (vol. 2) #40–43	2002	978-0785109051
Incredible Hulk vol. 3: Transfer of Power	The Incredible Hulk (vol. 2) #44–49	2003	978-0785110651
Incredible Hulk vol. 4: Abominable	The Incredible Hulk (vol. 2) #50–54	2003	978-0785111139
Incredible Hulk vol. 5: Hide in Plain Sight	The Incredible Hulk (vol. 2) #55–59	2003	978-0785111511
Incredible Hulk vol. 6: Split Decisions	The Incredible Hulk (vol. 2) #60–65	2004	978-0785112389
Incredible Hulk vol. 7: Dead Like Me	The Incredible Hulk (vol. 2) #66–69; Hulk Smash #1–2	2004	978-0785113997
Incredible Hulk vol. 8: Big Things	The Incredible Hulk (vol. 2) #70–76	2004	978-0785115335
Incredible Hulk: Tempest Fugit	The Incredible Hulk (vol. 2) #77–82	2005	978-0785115434
House of M: Incredible Hulk	The Incredible Hulk (vol. 2) #83–87	2006	978-0785118343
Incredible Hulk: Prelude to Planet Hulk	The Incredible Hulk (vol. 2) #88–91, Fantastic Four #533–535	2006	978-0785119531
Incredible Hulk: Planet Hulk	The Incredible Hulk (vol. 2) #92–105; Giant-Size Hulk #1; Amazing Fantasy (vol. 2) #15	2008	978-0785120124
World War Hulk: The Incredible Hercules	The Incredible Hulk (vol. 2) #106–111	2008	978-0785129912

==== Hulk vol. 2 ====
Title	Material collected	Year	ISBN
Hulk vol. 1: Red Hulk	Hulk vol. 2, #1–6	2009	978-0785128823
Hulk vol. 2: Red & Green	Hulk vol. 2, #7–9; King-Size Hulk #1	2009	978-0785128847
Hulk vol. 3: Hulk No More	Hulk vol. 2, #10–13; The Incredible Hulk #600	2010	978-0785140528
Hulk vol. 4: Hulk vs X-Force	Hulk vol. 2, #14–18	2010	978-0785140535
Hulk vol. 5: Fall of the Hulks	Hulk vol. 2, #19–21; Fall of the Hulks: Gamma	2010	978-0785140542
Hulk vol. 6: World War Hulks	Hulk vol. 2, #22–24	2011	978-0785142676
Red Hulk: Scorched Earth	Hulk vol. 2, #25–30	2011	978-0785148968
Red Hulk: Planet Red Hulk	Hulk vol. 2, #30.1; Hulk vol. 2, #31–36	2011	978-0785155782
Hulk: Fear Itself	Hulk vol. 2, #37–41	2012	978-0785155799
Hulk of Arabia	Hulk vol. 2, #42–48	2012	978-0785160953
Red Hulk: Haunted	Hulk vol. 2, #49–52	2012	978-0785160991
Red Hulk: Mayan Rule	Hulk vol. 2 #53–57	2012	978-0785160977
Hulk by Jeph Loeb: The Complete Collection vol. 1	Hulk vol. 2 #1–12, King-Size Hulk #1, Incredible Hulk vol. 2 #600, Wolverine vol. 3 #50	2013	978-0785185390
Hulk by Jeph Loeb: The Complete Collection vol. 2	Hulk vol. 2 #13–24, Fall of the Hulks: Gamma #1	2014	978-0785185512

==== The Incredible Hulk (2009 relaunch), The Incredible Hulks & The Incredible Hulk vol. 3 ====
Title	Material collected	Year	ISBN
Incredible Hulk vol. 1: Son of Banner	The Incredible Hulk #601–605; material from Dark Reign: The List	2010	978-0785142515
Incredible Hulk vol. 2: Fall of the Hulks	The Incredible Hulk #606–608; Fall of the Hulks: Alpha	2010	978-0785142522
Incredible Hulk vol. 3: World War Hulks	The Incredible Hulk #609–611	2010	978-0785145479
The Incredible Hulks: Dark Son	The Incredible Hulks #612–617	2010	978-0785150015
Chaos War: The Incredible Hulks	The Incredible Hulks #618–622	2011	978-0785151579
The Incredible Hulks: Planet Savage	The Incredible Hulks #623–629	2011	978-0785151593
The Incredible Hulks: Heart of the Monster	The Incredible Hulks #630–635	2011	978-0785156314
Incredible Hulk, vol. 1	The Incredible Hulk (vol. 3) #1–7, material from Fear Itself #7	2012	978-0785133285
Incredible Hulk, vol. 2	The Incredible Hulk (vol. 3) #7.1, 8–15	2013	978-0785161127
The Incredible Hulk by Jason Aaron: The Complete Collection	The Incredible Hulk (vol. 3) #1–7, 7.1, 8–15; material from Fear Itself #7	2017	978-1302907921

==== Indestructible Hulk ====
Title	Material collected	Year	ISBN
Indestructible Hulk vol. 1: Agent of S.H.I.E.L.D.	Indestructible Hulk #1–5	2013	978-0785168317
Indestructible Hulk vol. 2: Gods and Monster	Indestructible Hulk #6–10	2013	978-0785168324
Indestructible Hulk vol. 3: S.M.A.S.H. Time	Indestructible Hulk #11–15	2014	978-0785188841
Indestructible Hulk vol. 4: Humanity Bomb	Indestructible Hulk #16–20 and Annual #1	2014	978-0785154808
All-New X-Men/Indestructible Hulk/Superior Spider-Man: The Arms of the Octopus	All-New X-Men Special #1, Indestructible Hulk Special #1, Superior Spider-Man Special #1 and Wolverine: In The Flesh #1	2014	978-0785184386
Indestructible Hulk by Mark Waid: The Complete Collection	Indestructible Hulk #1–20 and Annual #1	2017	978-1302908003

==== Hulk vol. 3 ====
Title	Material collected	Year	ISBN
Hulk vol. 1: Banner DOA	Hulk vol. 3, #1–4	2015	978-0785190615
Hulk vol. 2: Omega Hulk Book 1	Hulk vol. 3, #5–10; Annual #1	2015	978-0785190684
Hulk vol. 3: Omega Hulk Book 2	Hulk vol. 3, #11–16	2015	978-0785192268
Hulk by Mark Waid & Gerry Duggan: The Complete Collection	Hulk vol. 3, #1–16; Annual #1; Original Sin #3.1–3.4	2018	978-1302913199

==== Totally Awesome Hulk and Incredible Hulk (2017 relaunch) ====
Title	Material collected	Publication date	ISBN
Amadeus Cho: Genius at Work	Material from Amazing Fantasy vol. 2 #15, Incredible Hulk vol. 3 #100 and Incredible Hercules #126, #133, #135 and #137	April 6, 2016	978-1302485498
Totally Awesome Hulk vol. 1: Cho Time	Totally Awesome Hulk #1–6 and material from Planet Hulk #1	July 26, 2016	978-0785196099
Totally Awesome Hulk vol. 2: Civil War II	Totally Awesome Hulk #7–12	January 10, 2017	978-0785196105
Totally Awesome Hulk vol. 3: Big Apple Showdown	Totally Awesome Hulk #13–18	July 25, 2017	978-1302903312
Weapon X vol. 1: Weapons of Mutant Destruction Prelude	Totally Awesome Hulk #19 and Weapon X vol. 3 #1–4	September 5, 2017	978-1302907341
Weapons of Mutant Destruction	Totally Awesome Hulk #20–22 and Weapon X vol. 3 #5–6, Weapons of Mutant Destruction	November 7, 2017	978-1302910853
Totally Awesome Hulk vol. 4: My Best Friends Are Monsters	Totally Awesome Hulk #19, 23, #1.MU; Generations: Banner Hulk & Totally Awesome Hulk #1, Moon Girl and Devil Dinosaur #4	January 2, 2018	978-1302905767
Hulk: Return to Planet Hulk	Incredible Hulk vol. 2 #709–713	May 29, 2018	978-1302909963
Hulk: World War Hulk II	Incredible Hulk vol. 2 #714-717, World War Hulk #1	September 26, 2018	978-1302909970

==== Hulk vol. 4 ====
Title	Material collected	Date	ISBN
She-Hulk Vol. 1: Deconstructed	Hulk vol. 4 #1–6	July 2017	ISBN 978-1-302-90567-5
She-Hulk Vol. 2: Let Them Eat Cake	Hulk vol. 4 #7–11	January 2018	ISBN 978-1-302-90568-2

==== The Immortal Hulk ====
Title	Material collected	Year	ISBN
Immortal Hulk vol. 1: Or Is He Both?	Immortal Hulk #1–5 and material from Avengers #684	November 21, 2018	978-1302912550
Immortal Hulk vol. 2: The Green Door	Immortal Hulk #6–10	February 13, 2019	978-1302912567
Immortal Hulk vol. 3: Hulk in Hell	Immortal Hulk #11–15	May 15, 2019	978-1302915063
Immortal Hulk vol. 4: Abomination	Immortal Hulk #16–20	September 4, 2019	978-1302916671
Immortal Hulk vol. 5: Breaker of Worlds	Immortal Hulk #21–25	November 20, 2019	978-1302916688
Immortal Hulk vol. 6: We Believe in Bruce Banner	Immortal Hulk #26–30	March 18, 2020	978-1302920500
Immortal Hulk vol. 7: Hulk Is Hulk	Immortal Hulk #31–35	September 2, 2020	978-1302920517
Immortal Hulk vol. 8: The Keeper of the Door	Immortal Hulk #36–40	January 20, 2021	978-1302920524
Immortal Hulk vol. 9: The Weakest One There Is	Immortal Hulk #41–45	June 9, 2021	978-1302925970
Immortal Hulk vol. 10: Of Hell And Of Death	Immortal Hulk #46–50	December 9, 2021	978-1302925987
Immortal Hulk vol. 11: Apocrypha	Immortal Hulk #0, Immortal She-Hulk, Immortal Hulk: The Best Defense, Defenders: The Best Defense, Absolute Carnage: Immortal Hulk, King In Black: Immortal Hulk	January 12, 2022	978-1302931162
The Immortal Hulk Omnibus (TPB)	Immortal Hulk #1–15 and material from Avengers #684	October 4, 2019	978-1846533600
The Immortal Hulk Omnibus vol. 2 (TPB)	Immortal Hulk #16–30	October 3, 2020	978-1846533952
The Immortal Hulk Omnibus vol. 3 (TPB)	Immortal Hulk #31–40, Immortal Hulk #0; Immortal She-Hulk #1	April 8, 2021	978-1846532931
The Immortal Hulk Omnibus vol. 4 (TPB)	Immortal Hulk #41–50	February, 1, 2022	978-1846533297
Immortal Hulk vol. 1 (HC)	Immortal Hulk #1–10 and material from Avengers #684	October 15, 2019	978-1302919658
Immortal Hulk vol. 2 (HC)	Immortal Hulk #11–20	July 21, 2020	978-1302923471
Immortal Hulk vol. 3 (HC)	Immortal Hulk #21–30	May 11, 2021	978-1302928308
Immortal Hulk vol. 4 (HC)	Immortal Hulk #31–40	November 16, 2021	978-1302931285
Immortal Hulk vol. 5 (HC)	Immortal Hulk #41–50	December 6, 2022	978-1302945268

==== Hulk Vol. 5 ====
Title	Material collected	Year	ISBN
Hulk Vol. 1: Smashtronaut!	Hulk (vol. 5) #1–6	June 7, 2022	978-1302925994
Hulk Vs. Thor: Banner Of War	Hulk (vol. 5) #7-8, Hulk Vs. Thor: Banner Of War #1, Thor (vol. 6) #25-26,	September 6, 2022	978-1302946630
Hulk Vol. 2: Hulk Planet	Hulk (vol. 5) #9-14	July 25, 2023	978-1302926007

==== Limited series ====
Title	Material collected	Year	ISBN
Banner	Startling Stories: Banner #1–4	2001	978-0785108535
The Sentry	Sentry: Hulk #1 and Sentry (vol. 1) #1–5, Sentry: Fantastic Four; Sentry: Spider-Man, Sentry: X-Men, Sentry Vs Void	2001	978-0785107996
Hulk/Wolverine: Six Hours	Hulk/Wolverine: Six Hours #1–4; Incredible Hulk #181	2003	978-0785111573
Hulk: Nightmerica	Hulk: Nightmerica #1-6	2004	978-0785110279
Captain Universe: Universal Heroes	Captain Universe/Hulk #1 and Captain Universe/Silver Surfer, Captain Universe/Daredevil, Captain Universe/Invisible Woman, Captain Universe/X-23, Amazing Fantasy (vol. 2) #13-14	2006	978-0785118572
Hulk and Power Pack: Pack Smash!	Hulk and Power Pack #1–4	2007	978-0785124900
Hulk: The End	Hulk: The End; Incredible Hulk: Future Imperfect #1–2	2008	978-1302924638
Hulk & Thing: Hard Knocks	Hulk & Thing: Hard Knocks #1–4; Giant-Size Super-Stars #1	2005	978-0785115762
Hulk Vs. The Marvel Universe	Fantastic Four (vol. 1) #25-26, Journey into Mystery #112, Tales to Astonish #92-93, Daredevil #163, Incredible Hulk #300, 340, Peter Parker: Spider-Man #14, Hulk Vs. Fin Fang Foom #1	2008	978-0785131298
Mythos	Mythos: Hulk #1 and Mythos: Spider-Man, Fantastic Four, Ghost Rider	2008	978-0785115977
World War Hulk	World War Hulk #1–5; World War Hulk: Aftersmash; Marvel Spotlight: World War Hulk; The Planet Hulk Saga #1	2009	978-0785126706
Hulk: Broken Worlds	Hulk: Broken Worlds #1–2; Hulk Family #1; X-Men vs. Hulk #1	2009	978-0785141822
Hulk: Gray	Hulk: Gray #1–6	2009	978-0785134480
Hulk – Fall of the Hulks Prelude	Hulk (vol. 2) #2, 16; Skaar: Son of Hulk #1; Hulk: Raging Thunder #1; Planet Skaar Prologue; All New Savage She-Hulk; and material from Amazing Fantasy (vol. 2) #15, Hulk (vol. 2) #9, Incredible Hulk #600–601	2010	978-0785143154
Ultimate Wolverine vs. Hulk	Ultimate Wolverine vs. Hulk #1–6	2010	978-0785141570
Tales from the Marvel Vault	From The Marvel Vault: Incredible Hulk & Human Torch #1 and From The Marvel Vault: Dr. Strange, Thunderbolts, Defenders, Gambit	2011	978-0785157847
The Incredible Hulks: World War Hulks	World War Hulks #1; Savage She-Hulks #1–3; Hulked Out Heroes #1–2; World War Hulks: Spider-Man vs. Thor #1–2; World War Hulks: Wolverine vs. Captain America #1–2; Incredible Hulk #312 and 609–611	2012	978-0785162155
Fear Itself: Hulk/Dracula	Hulk (vol. 2) #37-41, Hulk Vs. Dracula #1-3	2012	978-0785155805
Hulk Smash Avengers	Hulk Smash Avengers #1–5	2012	978-0785163053
Hulk: Season One	Original graphic novel	2012	978-0785163886
X-Men vs. Hulk	World War Hulk: X-Men #1–3; Hulk Team-Up #1; X-Men vs. Hulk #1; Incredible Hulk Annual #7; and material from Rampaging Hulk #2	2014	978-0785189022
Marvel Knights: Hulk – Transformé	Marvel Knights: Hulk #1–4; Hulk #1	2014	978-0785184065
Original Sin: Hulk vs. Iron Man	Original Sin: Hulk vs. Iron Man #3.1–3.4	2014	978-0785191568
Savage Hulk Vol. 1: The Man Within	Savage Hulk #1–4; Uncanny X-Men (vol. 1) #66	2014	978-0785190431
Savage Hulk Vol. 2: Down to Crossroads	Savage Hulk #5–6; Monster Size Hulk #1; Hulk: Let the Battle Begin #1	2015	978-0785197270
Thanos vs. Hulk	Thanos vs. Hulk #1–4; Warlock #12	2015	978-0785197126
Planet Hulk	Planet Hulk #1-5	2016	978-0785198819
Thor & Hulk	Marvel Adventures Super Heroes #7, 11, Marvel Adventures Hulk #12-13, Journey into Mystery #112	2017	978-1302909321
Thor Vs. Hulk: Champions of the Universe	Thor Vs. Hulk - Champions of The Universe #1-6	2018	978-1302905378
Marvel Vault of Heroes: Hulk: Biggest & Best	Marvel Adventures Hulk #1-12	2019	978-1684056613
Defenders: The Best Defense	Immortal Hulk: The Best Defense #1 and Namor: The Best Defense #1, Doctor Strange: The Best Defense #1, Silver Surfer: The Best Defense #1, Defenders: The Best Defense #1	2019	978-1302916145
Absolute Carngage: Immortal Hulk and Other Tales	Absolute Carnage: Immortal Hulk #1 and Absolute Carnage: Symbiote Spider-Man #1, Absolute Carnage: Symbiote of Vengeance #1, stinger pages from Symbiote Spider-Man #3 and Immortal Hulk #20	2020	978-1302924485
Immortal Hulk: Great Power	Immortal Hulk: Great Power #1, Immortal Hulk: The Threshing Place #1, Immortal Hulk: Flatline #1, Immortal Hulk: Time of Monsters #1	2021	978-1302931179
Hulk: Grand Design	Hulk: Grand Design - Monster #1, Hulk: Grand Design - Madness #1	2023	978-1302927646
Planet Hulk: Worldbreaker	Planet Hulk: Worldbreaker #1-5	2023	978-1302934736
