= 1872 (comic book) =

Comic book limited series by Marvel Comics

Publication information
- Publisher: Marvel Comics
- Schedule: Monthly
- Format: Limited series
- Genre: Superhero; Western
- Publication date: July – October 2015
- Main character(s): Red Wolf; Tony Stark; Steve Rogers; Bruce Banner; Natasha Barnes; Wilson Fisk

Creative team
- Written by: Gerry Duggan
- Artist: Nik Virella

1872 is a four-issue comic book limited series published by Marvel Comics. The series, written by Gerry Duggan and illustrated by Nik Virella, was published from July to October 2015, as a tie-in to the Secret Wars (2015–2016) storyline.

== Premise ==
1872 presents an alternate reality with reimagined versions of Marvel Comics characters in a Western-themed setting.

== Publication history ==
In March 2015, Marvel Comics announced the four-issue comic book limited series 1872 as a tie-in to the Secret Wars (2015–2016) storyline, with Gerry Duggan as writer and Evan "Doc" Shaner as illustrator, though the latter was subsequently replaced by Nik Virella. 1872 was published from July to October 2015.

=== Issues ===
Issue	Publication date	Ref.
#1	July 8, 2015	
#2	August 19, 2015	
#3	September 23, 2015	
#4	October 21, 2015	

== In other media ==
- The 1872 versions of Iron Man, Bullseye, Bruce Banner, and Captain America appear as playable characters in Lego Marvel Super Heroes 2 (2017).
- The 1872 storyline was adapted in an episode of the third season of the Disney+ animated series What If...? (2021–2024).
