= List of Carol Danvers titles =

This is a list of titles featuring the Marvel Comics superhero Carol Danvers. The character first appeared in Marvel Super-Heroes #13 (March 1968). She was later given her own series in January 1977. All stories presented in this list are published by Marvel Comics under their standard imprint, unless otherwise noted. The list includes the Ms. Marvel, Binary, Warbird and Captain Marvel versions of the character.

== Previous series ==
Carol Danvers has had a number of ongoing series that have since ended:

=== Mainstream continuity ===
- Ms. Marvel #1–23 (January 1977 – April 1979). The series marks the debut of Carol Danvers as Ms. Marvel.
  - Ms. Marvel (vol. 2) #1–50 (March 2006 – February 2010).
- Captain Marvel #1–17 (July 2012 – January 2014). This series marks the debut of Carol Danvers as Captain Marvel.
  - Captain Marvel (vol. 2) #1–15 (March 2014 – May 2015).
  - Captain Marvel (vol. 3) #1–10 (January 2016 – January 2017).
  - Captain Marvel (vol. 4) #1–50 (January 2019 – June 2023).
  - Captain Marvel (vol. 5) #1–10 (October 2023 – July 2024).
- Mighty Captain Marvel #0–9 (December 2016 – September 2017).

== Miniseries ==
=== Mainstream continuity ===
- The Life of Captain Marvel #1–5 (July 2018 – December 2018). The fifth issue was supposed to be released in November but was delayed to December.
- Captain Marvel: Dark Tempest #1–5 (July 2023 – November 2023).
- Binary #1–3 (October 2025 – December 2025).

=== Other continuities ===
- Captain Marvel and the Carol Corps #1–4 (June 2015 – September 2015).
- Marvel Action: Captain Marvel #1–6 (August 2019 – August 2020).
  - Marvel Action: Captain Marvel (vol. 2) #1–5 (March 2021 – July 2021).

== One-shots ==
=== Mainstream continuity ===
- Giant-Size Ms. Marvel #1 (February 2006). This comic book marks the debut of Chewbacca Sassy "Chewie" Danvers.
- Ms. Marvel Special #1 (January 2007).
- Ms. Marvel Annual #1 (September 2008).
- Ms. Marvel Special: Storyteller #1 (November 2008).
- Generations: Captain Marvel & Captain Mar-Vell #1 (September 2017).
- Generations: Ms. Marvel & Ms. Marvel #1 (September 2017).
- Infinity Countdown: Captain Marvel #1 (May 2018).
- Captain Marvel: Braver & Mightier #1 (February 2019).
- Absolute Carnage: Captain Marvel #1 (November 2019).
- Captain Marvel: Marvels Snapshots #1 (February 2021).

=== Other continuities ===
- Marvel Super Hero Adventures: Captain Marvel - First Day of School #1 (September 2018).
- Marvel's Captain Marvel Prelude #1 (November 2018).
- Captain Marvel: The End #1 (January 2020).

== Reception – Series ==
=== Mainstream continuity ===
==== Ms. Marvel (1977) ====
Diamond Comic Distributors reported that the trade paperback Essential Series: Ms. Marvel was the 23rd best-selling graphic novel in February 2007. The trade paperback Epic Collection: Ms. Marvel was the 38th best-selling graphic novel in January 2019.

Claire Napier of Newsarama ranked the Ms. Marvel series comic book series 2nd in their "10 Best Captain Marvel Stories" list. She said that Captain Marvel #18 marked a diminished issue for Carol Danvers in terms of her active role. However, she praised the impact of the events in this issue, noting that Danvers' apparent death at the hands of Yon-Rogg eventually leads to her introduction as Ms. Marvel in 1977. Napier found that Danvers' transformation into a features writer-turned-magazine editor allowed her to confront public skepticism and the criticism of her editor, J. Jonah Jameson. She appreciated how Danvers stood firm on her salary demands and developed friendships, particularly with Mary Jane Watson, showcasing her growth and depth as a character.

==== Ms. Marvel (2006) ====
Diamond Comic Distributors reported that Ms. Marvel #1 was 17th best-selling comic book in March 2006. Ms. Marvel TPB: Secret Invasion was 46th best-selling graphic novel in March 2009.

Hilary Goldstein of IGN called Ms. Marvel #1 "good, but not a necessity," stating that while Brian Reed's previous attempt with Spider-Woman: Origin was decent, Ms. Marvel stands out as a stronger title. Goldstein found that Reed effectively highlights the contrast between Carol Danvers' immense power and her low self-esteem, providing a solid foundation for the series. He appreciated Reed's nod to Danvers' connections with both the Avengers and X-Men, especially by bringing back a classic X-Men villain in the first issue. He praised the issue as a solid start with the potential to grow into something great.

==== Captain Marvel (2012) ====
Marvel Comics reported that Captain Marvel #1 sold out in July 2012. Diamond Comic Distributors reported that Captain Marvel #1 was the 42nd best-selling comic book in July 2012.

Benjamin Bailey of IGN gave Captain Marvel #1 a score of 9/10, stating that despite its premise of an old character adopting a dead character's legacy and name, the comic doesn't feel like a gimmick. He appreciated the strong writing and art, noting that it's "just a really great superhero comic book." Bridget LaMonica of Den of Geek rated Captain Marvel Vol. 1: In Pursuit of Flight and Captain Marvel Volume 2: Down 4.5 out of 5 stars, finding Carol Danvers to be an iconic, patriotic hero who has matured in her role with a responsible yet humorous personality. Fangrrls Staff of Syfy included Captain Marvel #1 among their favorite comics of the decade, asserting that Kelly Sue DeConnick redefined Carol, elevating her with a confident, caring arc that resonated with fans, inspiring the "Carol Corps" and informing her MCU portrayal.

==== Captain Marvel (2014) ====
Diamond Comic Distributors reported that Captain Marvel #1 was the 32nd best-selling comic book in March 2014.

Meagan Damore of Comic Book Resources said that while Carol Danvers has been in space before, Captain Marvel #1 feels "fresh, fun, and full of life" thanks to DeConnick's writing and Lopez's art. She found the issue to be a solid starting point for both new and returning fans. Melissa Grey of IGN gave Captain Marvel #1 a grade of 8/10, stating that it offers a promising start, with potential to explore new ground in Carol Danvers' journey of self-discovery.

==== Captain Marvel (2016) ====
Diamond Comic Distributors reported that Captain Marvel #1 was the 22nd best-selling comic book in January 2016.

Jamie Rice of ComicsVerse called Captain Marvel #1 a "nice self-contained story," and praised its combination of "amazing character and story" with beautiful art by Kris Anka and colors by Matt Wilson. Rice stated that the comic offers a fresh take on Carol's space adventures, balancing reality and heightened reality. She found Carol Danvers' more muscular physique a bold and fitting evolution for her character, adding strength to her portrayal. Jesse Schedeen of IGN gave Captain Marvel #1 a grade of 8.5/10, stating that the new series is more of an ensemble sci-fi tale than a traditional superhero comic, comparing it to Star Trek or Battlestar Galactica.

==== The Mighty Captain Marvel (2017) ====
Diamond Comic Distributors reported that Mighty Captain Marvel #1 was the 32nd best-selling comic book in January 2017.

Leia Calderon of Comic Book Resources called The Might Captain Marvel #1 an "inventive take on Carol Danvers," stating that while the issue feels "slightly graceless" with a lot happening at once, it shows promise by tackling contemporary issues. Calderon praised the creative team for crafting a "love letter" to the character, building on her foundation while providing a fresh direction for both new and longtime fans. IGN gave The Might Captain Marvel #1 a score of 6.2/10, asserting that while new writer Margaret Stohl captures Carol's essence, the debut feels "disappointingly familiar" despite being solidly constructed with strong art by Ramon Rosanas.

==== The Life of Captain Marvel (2018) ====
Diamond Comic Distributors reported that The Life of Captain Marvel #1 was the 14th best-selling comic book in July 2018.

Joshua Davison of Bleeding Cool called The Life of Captain Marvel #1 a "heartfelt look at Carol Danvers's youth," saying that it avoids the typical pitfalls of origin story retellings by centering the conflict on Joe Danvers's abuse. He found the framing of Danvers' present-day return home alongside her past struggles to be a clever approach. Davison praised the emotional depth and action-packed nature of the story, noting the excellent artwork and recommending the issue with "ease." Matthew Aguilar of ComicBook.com noted that while The Life of Captain Marvel #1 is an origin story, it diverges from the norm by focusing primarily on the present, using flashbacks that enhance rather than overwhelm the narrative. He highlighted the gorgeous visuals by artist Marguerite Sauvage, which contrast beautifully with Carlos Pacheco's artwork in the current timeline. Aguilar asserted that the issue presents an intriguing mystery connected to Carol's family history, making it accessible for new readers despite her complicated past. He concluded that The Life of Captain Marvel is off to an amazing start and emphasized that it embraces Carol's evolution as a character and hero, making it a story fans shouldn't miss.

==== Captain Marvel (2019) ====
Diamond Comic Distributors reported that Captain Marvel #1 was the 2nd best-selling comic book in January 2019. Captain Marvel #1 was the 26th best-selling comic book in 2019.

Mike Fugere of Comic Book Resources described Captain Marvel #1 as a "solid groundwork for something with the potential to be really special," stating that while it may not be the most complex and thrilling debut for Carol Danvers, it offers a lot of fun. He praised the efforts of Thompson and Carnero for laying a solid foundation for future stories and emphasized that the sudden shift at the end of the issue is exactly why readers enjoy comics, as it keeps the narrative unpredictable. Maite Molina of ComicsVerse gave Captain Marvel #1 a score of 80%, writing that it is a solid work despite some setbacks. She noted that while the story sets up multiple significant events for future issues, the process sometimes feels clunky. However, she acknowledged Thompson's success in reintroducing Carol following the events of The Life of Captain Marvel and highlighted the preview of an adventure with epic potential. Ultimately, she concluded that despite its flaws, Captain Marvel #1 offers a grand taste of a potentially fantastic story ahead. Matthew Mueller of ComicBook.com gave Captain Marvel #1 a grade of 5 out of 5, asserting that Carol has won fans over the years due to her relatable struggle to be the best hero she can be, despite her impressive powers and cool costume. He noted her evolution from Ms. Marvel to a powerful icon in the Marvel universe while emphasizing her humanity at the center of the narrative. Mueller praised Thompson and her team for blending beloved elements of Carol's character with new developments, culminating in a twist at the end that opens up exciting possibilities for her future. He summed up the issue as a perfect mix of the old and the new, suggesting that readers will be drawn in by the familiar Carol while being excited for the revolutionary journey ahead.

==== Captain Marvel (2023) ====
ComicHub reported that Captain Marvel #1 was best 58th best-selling comic book in October 2023. The ComicHub Top 200 Comic Books sales chart reflects sales data collected from the ComicHub system at comic shops across the globe that sell American comics. This report was created based on information from more than 125 stores that used the ComicHub system during the reporting period.

Matthew Aguilar of ComicBook.com praised Captain Marvel #1 as a "stellar start" to a new era, highlighting Alyssa Wong's strong grasp of Danvers' voice and the introduction of fresh characters, especially Yuna Yang. He commended the new costume design and action-packed art by Jan Bazaldua and Bryan Valenza, calling it a visual standout. While he noted some similarities to The Marvels, Aguilar appreciated the comic's unique direction and expressed excitement for its future, despite the absence of Danvers' usual supporting cast. Tim Rooney of ComicsBeat described Captain Marvel #1 as a "blast of a first issue," praising Alyssa Wong's fast-paced script and Jan Bazaldua's dynamic art. Rooney highlighted the superhero action, especially the introduction of the new villain, Omen, and the clash between Danvers and Yuna Yang. While the issue stumbles with exposition in Yang's introduction, Rooney found the interactions between Danvers and Yang compelling. He complimented the new costume by Jen Bartel but noted it might be too complex to become iconic. Rooney recommended the issue for its action-packed spectacle.

==== Binary (2025) ====
ACE Comics reported that Binary #1 was the 23rd best-selling comic book in the United Kingdom for the week ending October 8. The ACE Comics Top 50 Bestsellers chart reflects sales data collected from ACE Comics' retail locations and online store in the United Kingdom.

Joe Jones of AIPT Comics described Binary #1 as a strong introduction to Carol Danvers' new role as the host of the Phoenix Force. Jones praised writer Stephanie Phillips for giving Carol depth and emotional conflict, portraying her as both powerful and uncertain about living up to Jean Grey's legacy. He highlighted the dynamic and visually striking artwork by Giada Belviso and Rachelle Rosenberg, particularly during the action sequences featuring Danvers in her Binary form. Jones found the issue clear and engaging, though he noted that some plot details, such as the circumstances of Grey's death and the reasons for Danvers' selection, remain unresolved. B. Radtz of Comic Watch praised Stephanie Phillips's characterization of Carol Danvers and the setup of a dystopian story ten years after the release of the X-virus. He noted that Phillips captures Danvers' voice well, portraying her as a powerful yet strained protector whose control over her hometown is being undermined by disinformation and a mysterious antagonist. While Radtz appreciated the grounded, earthbound setting following Phillips's previous cosmic Phoenix series, he found the narrative occasionally confusing for readers unfamiliar with the Age of Revelation storyline and felt that Binary #1 was missing "something" to make it fully satisfying.

=== Other continuities ===
==== Captain Marvel and the Carol Corps (2015) ====
Diamond Comic Distributors reported that Captain Marvel and the Carol Corps #1 was the 44th best-selling comic book in June 2015.

Doug Zawisza of Comic Book Resources said that Captain Marvel and the Carol Corps #1 feels reminiscent of an early Cold War tale, particularly with Lopez's costume design for Danvers. He found that DeConnick and Thompson establish a strong hierarchy where obedience and trust are central, with Danvers grappling between following orders and pursuing the unknown. Zawisza stated that the issue effectively sets up the conflict between curiosity and authority in a world ruled by Victor Von Doom. IGN praised Captain Marvel and the Carol Corps #1, giving the issue a score of 8.2/10, noting how DeConnick and Thompson blend familiar elements with fresh energy, balancing serious conflict and humor, enhanced by Lopez's expressive artwork.

==== Marvel Action: Captain Marvel (2019) ====
Diamond Comic Distributors reported that Marvel Action: Captain Marvel TPB Vol 1 1: Cosmic CAT-tastrophe was the 51st best-selling trade paperback in March 2020.

Kate Gardner of The Mary Sue praised Marvel Action: Captain Marvel #1 for its accessible, lighthearted tone and appealing art. She highlighted Sam Maggs's writing for capturing Carol Danvers's breezy confidence and strong friendship with Jessica Drew, calling their dynamic the best part of the issue. Gardner also underscored Sweeney Boo's vibrant, expressive art and Brittany Peer's colors, describing the visuals as "absolutely gorgeous" and well-suited to readers of all ages. She noted that the comic serves as an excellent introduction to Captain Marvel for younger readers, particularly those familiar with the character from the Marvel Cinematic Universe. Matthew Aguilar of ComicBook.com rated Marvel Action: Captain Marvel #1 four out of five and said it offers something enjoyable for both new and longtime fans. Aguilar praised writer Sam Maggs for creating a lighthearted story that effectively brings together Captain Marvel's essential traits without feeling routine. He found the initial scenes with Spider-Woman and Captain Marvel to be especially charming. Aguilar also stated that the visuals by artist Sweeney Boo and colorist Brittany Peer make the characters even more endearing, resulting in a striking portrayal of Captain Marvel. He concluded that the comic would be perfect for new fans, while longtime followers would also have fun with it.

== Reception – One-Shots ==
=== Mainstream continuity ===
==== Giant-Size Ms. Marvel (2006) ====
Marvel Comics announced Giant-Size Ms. Marvel #1 sold out in February 2006. Diamond Comic Distributors reported that Giant-Size Ms. Marvel #1 was the 121st best-selling comic book in February 2006.

==== Generations: Captain Marvel & Captain Mar-Vell (2017) ====
Diamond Comic Distributors reported that Generations: Captain Marvel & Captain Mar-Vell #1 was the 51st best-selling comic book in September 2017.

Joshua Davison of Bleeding Cool stated that Generations: Captain Marvel & Captain Mar-Vell #1 is "a flawed comic, but still a fun read for the most part." He found issues with its pacing and artwork but appreciated the dynamic between the two Captain Marvels, which made the comic enjoyable. He recommended it based on its "charisma and gumption," encouraging readers to give it a try despite its imperfections.

==== Generations: Ms. Marvel & Ms. Marvel (2017) ====
Diamond Comic Distributors reported that Generations: Ms. Marvel & Ms. Marvel #1 was the 43rd best-selling comic book in September 2017.

IGN gave Generations: Ms. Marvel & Ms. Marvel #1 a grade of 8.9 out of 10, stating that it was refreshing to see Carol Danvers back in action as the hero fans know her to be, especially after her recent controversial treatment. The critic praised the comic as "freaking fun" and a welcome change from the more somber tone of the Marvel universe of late. They found it to be a reminder of why readers love comics, noting that even if it doesn't significantly impact Kamala Khan and Carol's relationship, it was still "a nice dream."

==== Infinity Countdown: Captain Marvel (2018) ====
Diamond Comic Distributors reported that Infinity Countdown: Captain Marvel #1 was the 66th best-selling comic book in May 2018.

Joshua Davison of Bleeding Cool described Infinity Countdown: Captain Marvel #1 as a "great personal story for Carol Danvers," stating that it offers a compelling character study, showcasing her current state and future potential. He praised the issue as a solid starting point for new readers and commended the artwork by Oolortegui and Arciniega, ultimately recommending it. Matthew Mueller of ComicBook.com gave Infinity Countdown: Captain Marvel #1 a grade of three out of five, asserting that while it falls short as a meaningful tie-in to Infinity Countdown, it successfully addresses Carol Danvers' character arc post-Civil War II. He found that the story could bring lapsed fans back, even if it's not essential for Infinity Countdown followers.

==== Absolute Carnage: Captain Marvel (2019) ====
Diamond Comic Distributors reported that Absolute Carnage: Captain Marvel #1 was the 55th best-selling comic book in November 2019.

=== Other continuities ===
==== Marvel Super Hero Adventures: Captain Marvel - First Day of School (2018) ====
Diamond Comic Distributors reported that Marvel Super Hero Adventures: Captain Marvel #1 was the 217th best-selling comic book in September 2018.

Chase Magnett of ComicBook.com gave Marvel Super Hero Adventures: Captain Marvel - First Day of School #1 a grade of 4 out of 5, stating that the newest entry in this young readers line at Marvel Comics makes notable improvements. He noted that the removal of the framing device featuring more realistically portrayed characters allows for better focus on the cartoonish and fun nature of the comic. He highlighted the inclusion of a middle segment with spoofs of classic comic strips, which provides a refreshing break for both young readers and the adults likely reading alongside them. Magnett found the adventure easy to follow and filled with engaging gags and big action that captures attention throughout its 20 pages. He concluded that the comic sets a solid standard for superhero comics aimed at those just beginning to read.

==== Captain Marvel: The End (2020) ====
Diamond Comic Distributors reported that Captain Marvel: The End #1 was the 70th best-selling comic book in January 2020.

Samantha Puc of Comics Beat asserted that Kelly Thompson's compassion for Carol Danvers' trauma and her deep understanding of the character shine through in Captain Marvel: The End #1. She highlighted the reunion of Thompson with artist Carmen Carnero, noting that together they deliver a gut-wrenching examination of grief and hope. Puc expressed her admiration for the entire issue, particularly praising David Curiel's stunning color work. She pointed out how the shifts in mood and atmosphere are executed flawlessly, creating an amazing effect. Ultimately, Puc concluded that this issue is absolutely worth buying. Matthew Aguilar of ComicBook.com stated that if Captain Marvel: The End #1 truly were the last Captain Marvel story, it would be an incredible way to conclude her journey. He praised the dynamic reunion of writer Kelly Thompson and artist Carmen Carnero, emphasizing that their collaboration, along with colorist David Curiel, creates a visual tour de force that will delight any Captain Marvel fan. Aguilar highlighted how Thompson effectively brings to light the best aspects of Captain Marvel's mythos and supporting cast, delivering a story filled with surprising reveals, endearing relationships, and a poignant yet hopeful ending. He concluded that this issue encompasses everything one would want in a finale for the "Boss of Space," while expressing that he is perfectly content with Captain Marvel continuing her adventures for the foreseeable future.

== Collected editions ==
Title	Material collected	Publication date	ISBN
Ms. Marvel (1977–1979)
Essential Ms. Marvel, Vol. 1	Ms. Marvel #1–23; Marvel Super-Heroes Magazine #10–11; Avengers Annual #10	February 2007	978-0-7851-2499-3 (SC)
Ms. Marvel Epic Collection, Vol. 1: This Woman, This Warrior	Ms. Marvel #1–14; Marvel Team-Up #61–62; Defenders #57	January 2019	978-1-302-91639-8 (SC)
Ms. Marvel Epic Collection, Vol. 2: The Woman Who Fell to Earth	Ms. Marvel #15–23; Marvel Two-In-One #51; Marvel Super-Heroes #10–11; Avengers #200, Annual #10; material from Avengers #197–199; Marvel Fanfare #24	May 2019	978-1-302-91802-6 (SC)
Captain Marvel: Ms. Marvel: A Hero is Born	Ms. Marvel #1–23; Marvel Team-Up #61–62, #76–77; Defenders #57; Marvel Two-In-One #51; Marvel Super-Heroes #10–11; Avengers #200, Annual #10; material from Avengers #197–199; Marvel Fanfare #24	February 2019	978-1-302-91539-1 (HC)
Ms. Marvel (2006–2010)
Vol. 1: Best of the Best	Ms. Marvel vol. 2 #1–5; Giant-Size Ms. Marvel	October 2006	978-0-7851-2281-4 (HC) 978-0-7851-1996-8 (SC)
Vol. 2: Civil War	Ms. Marvel vol. 2 #6–10; Ms. Marvel Special	March 2007	978-0-7851-2304-0 (HC) 978-0-7851-2305-7 (SC)
Vol. 3: Operation Lightning Storm	Ms. Marvel vol. 2 #11–17	October 2007	978-0-7851-2890-8 (HC) 978-0-7851-2449-8 (SC)
Vol. 4: Monster Smash	Ms. Marvel vol. 2 #18–24	March 2008	978-0-7851-3018-5 (HC) 978-0-7851-2813-7 (SC)
Vol. 5: Secret Invasion	Ms. Marvel vol. 2 #25–30	October 2008	978-0-7851-3019-2 (HC) 978-0-7851-3299-8 (SC)
Vol. 6: Ascension	Ms. Marvel vol. 2 #31–34, Annual #1; Ms. Marvel Special: Storyteller	March 2009	978-0-7851-3457-2 (HC) 978-0-7851-3178-6 (SC)
Vol. 7: Dark Reign	Ms. Marvel vol. 2 #35–41	September 2009	978-0-7851-3838-9 (HC) 978-0-7851-3839-6 (SC)
Vol. 8: War of the Marvels	Ms. Marvel vol. 2 #42–46	December 2009	978-0-7851-3840-2 (HC) 978-0-7851-3841-9 (SC)
Vol. 9: Best You Can Be	Ms. Marvel vol. 2 #47–50	April 2010	978-0-7851-4573-8 (HC) 978-0-7851-4574-5 (SC)
Captain Marvel: Carol Danvers—The Ms. Marvel Years, Vol. 1	Giant-Size Ms. Marvel #1; Ms. Marvel vol. 2 #1–17; and Ms. Marvel Special #1	February 2018	978-1-302-91014-3 (SC)
Captain Marvel: Carol Danvers—The Ms. Marvel Years, Vol. 2	Ms. Marvel vol. 2 #18–34; and Annual #1	June 2018	978-1-302-91174-4 (SC)
Captain Marvel: Carol Danvers—The Ms. Marvel Years, Vol. 3	Ms. Marvel vol. 2 #35–50; Ms. Marvel Special: Storyteller; and Siege: Spider-Man	December 2018	978-1-302-91563-6 (SC)
Captain Marvel (2012–2014)
Vol. 1: In Pursuit of Flight	Captain Marvel vol. 7 #1–6	January 2013	978-0-7851-6549-1 (SC)
Vol. 2: Down	Captain Marvel vol. 7 #7–12	June 2013	978-0-7851-6550-7 (SC)
Avengers: The Enemy Within	Avengers: The Enemy Within #1; Captain Marvel vol. 7 #13–14, 17; Avengers Assemble Vol. 2 #16–17	December 2013	978-0-7851-8403-4 (SC)
Infinity Companion	Captain Marvel Vol. 7 #15–16	April 2014	978-0-7851-8886-5 (HC)
Captain Marvel: Earth's Mightiest Hero Vol. 1	Captain Marvel vol. 7 #1–12	June 2016	978-1-302-90127-1 (SC)
Captain Marvel: Earth's Mightiest Hero Vol. 2	Captain Marvel vol. 7 #13–17; Avengers: The Enemy Within #1; Avengers Assemble #16–19; Avenging Spider-Man #9–10	November 2016	978-1-302-90128-8 (SC)
Captain Marvel (2014–2015)
Captain Marvel Vol. 1: Higher, Further, Faster, More	Captain Marvel vol. 8 #1–6	October 2014	978-0-7851-9013-4 (SC)
Captain Marvel Vol. 2: Stay Fly	Captain Marvel vol. 8 #7–11	April 2015	978-0-7851-9014-1 (SC)
Captain Marvel Vol. 3: Alis Volat Propriis	Captain Marvel vol. 8 #12–15	September 2015	978-0-7851-9841-3 (SC)
Captain Marvel & the Carol Corps	Captain Marvel & the Carol Corps #1–4	December 2015	978-0-7851-9865-9 (SC)
Captain Marvel: Earth's Mightiest Hero Vol. 3	Captain Marvel vol. 8 #1–11	February 2017	978-1-302-90268-1 (SC)
Captain Marvel: Earth's Mightiest Hero Vol. 4	Captain Marvel vol. 8 #12–15, Captain Marvel & the Carol Corps #1–4	August 2017	978-1-302-90269-8 (SC)
Captain Marvel (2016–2017)
Captain Marvel Vol. 1: Rise of Alpha Flight	Captain Marvel vol. 9 #1–5	August 2016	978-0-7851-9642-6 (SC)
Captain Marvel Vol. 2: Civil War II	Captain Marvel vol. 9 #6–10	February 2017	978-0-7851-9643-3 (SC)
Captain Marvel: Earth's Mightiest Hero Vol. 5	Captain Marvel vol. 9 #1–10	February 2019	978-1-302-91541-4 (SC)
The Mighty Captain Marvel (2017–2018)
The Mighty Captain Marvel Vol. 1: Alien Nation	The Mighty Captain Marvel vol. 1 #0–4	September 2017	978-1-302-90605-4 (SC)
The Mighty Captain Marvel Vol. 2: Band of Sisters	The Mighty Captain Marvel vol. 2 #5–9	December 2017	978-1-302-90606-1 (SC)
The Mighty Captain Marvel Vol. 3: Dark Origins	The Mighty Captain Marvel vol. 3 #10–14 (renumbered as Captain Marvel #125–129)	June 2018	978-1-302-90607-8 (SC)
The Life of Captain Marvel (2018)
The Life of Captain Marvel	The Life of Captain Marvel #1–5	February 2019	978-1-302-91253-6 (SC)
Captain Marvel (2019–)
Captain Marvel Vol. 1: Re-Entry	Captain Marvel vol. 10 #1–5	August 2019	978-1-302-91687-9 (SC)
Captain Marvel Vol. 2: Falling Star	Captain Marvel vol. 10 #6-11	January 2020	978-1-302-91688-6 (SC)
Captain Marvel Vol. 3: The Last Avenger	Captain Marvel vol. 10 #12-17	September 2020	978-1-302-92308-2 (SC)
Captain Marvel Vol. 4: Accused	Captain Marvel vol. 10 #18-21, Empyre (2020) #2	November 2020	978-1-302-92562-8 (SC)
Captain Marvel Vol. 5: The New World	Captain Marvel vol. 10 #22-26	May 2021	978-1-302-92595-6 (SC)
Captain Marvel Vol. 6: Strange Magic	Captain Marvel vol. 10 #27-30	October 2021	978-1-302-92596-3 (SC)
Captain Marvel Vol. 7: The Last Of The Marvels	Captain Marvel vol. 10 #31-36	April 2022	978-1-302-92884-1 (SC)
Captain Marvel Vol. 8: The Trials	Captain Marvel vol. 10 #37-41 and Annual #1	October 2022	978-1-302-93264-0 (SC)
Captain Marvel Vol. 9: Revenge of the Brood Part 1	Captain Marvel vol. 10 #42-46	May 2023	978-1-302-94762-0 (SC)
Captain Marvel Vol. 10: Revenge of the Brood Part 2	Captain Marvel vol. 10 #47-50	September 2023	978-1-302-94763-7 (SC)
