= Secret Wars (2015 comic book) =

Storyline by Marvel Comics

- Cover of Secret Wars #1 (May 2015) by Alex Ross
- Publisher: Marvel Comics
- Publication date: May 2015 – January 2016
- Genre: Superhero; Crossover
- Main character(s): Doctor Doom; Mister Fantastic; Black Panther; Doctor Strange; Invisible Woman; Molecule Man; Valeria Richards; Franklin Richards; Spider-Man; Namor; Thanos; Cyclops; Maker (Reed Richards); Miles Morales; Madelyne Pryor

Creative team
- Writer: Jonathan Hickman
- Artist: Esad Ribić
- Colorist: Ive Svorcina

Secret Wars is a 2015 to 2016 American comic book crossover storyline published by Marvel Comics and recalls the 1984 to 1985 miniseries of the same name. Released on May 6, 2015, the storyline includes a core Secret Wars miniseries, written by Jonathan Hickman and drawn by Esad Ribić, which picks up from where the "Time Runs Out" storyline running in The Avengers and New Avengers ended. The event also served as a conclusion to the Fantastic Four (which Hickman had written from 2009 through 2012) after Marvel decided to cancel the title due to a film rights dispute with 20th Century Fox.

The storyline involves the destruction of the Marvel Universe and various other alternate universes (including those seen in the Ultimate Marvel and Marvel 2099 imprints, the "Age of Apocalypse" storyline, the Marvel 1602 universe, and the "House of M" storyline), with each universe's respective Earth combining with each other into Battleworld, a planet that exhibits the aspects of the various universes. The planet itself is divided in many territories that are mostly self-contained and where a "pocket universe" composed of a specific storyline or universe resides and evolves. Various versions of individual Marvel characters can be present multiple times on the Battleworld. For example, there is a Tony Stark present in many of the territories where the Kingdom of Manhattan has both the Earth-1610 and the Earth-616 versions, and many versions of Thor serve as a peace-keeping force. The stories depicted in the miniseries about each domain's characters' powers and personal histories vastly differ from the ones portrayed in the main Marvel universe(s). Following the events of this storyline Miles Morales, who originated within the Ultimate universe was integrated alongside his family (with his mother Rio and uncle Aaron being restored to life) and friends into the prime Marvel Universe or Earth-616.

The core limited series was originally to be eight issues long, but was later decided to extend to a ninth. The series ran for nine months. The miniseries are in three categories, which are Battleworld, Warzones, and Last Days. One of the core miniseries is Ultimate End which ends the Ultimate Marvel imprint after 15 years. Ultimate End was written by Brian Michael Bendis and artist Mark Bagley, the team that began the Ultimate Marvel universe with Ultimate Spider-Man.

The series was released to positive reviews, with critics praising the storyline, characters, action, and art styles.

== Premise ==
The series was introduced with two issues in May 2015, then ran monthly until December. The series began with a nine-issue miniseries (plus a Free Comic Book Day issue #0) and came out of the current Avengers and New Avengers "Time Runs Out" storyline. The basic premise involves the collision, or what is referred to as an inter-dimensional "incursion", of the Marvel 616 Universe with the Ultimate Marvel 1610 Universe; which destroys both. Pieces of the two universes are mysteriously saved and combined with other post-collision universes, creating the "Battleworld."

== Tie-in branding ==
Numerous tie-in miniseries and ongoing titles fleshed out the event with many of them revisiting previous Marvel storylines such as "Civil War", "Age of Apocalypse", "Days of Future Past" (renamed, in this 2015 event, to "Years of Future Past") and "Armor Wars". All of the tie-ins were aligned into one of three subtitles during the event consisting of Last Days, Battleworld, and Warzones. Warzones, Battleworld, and Last Days made Secret Wars one of the most expansive crossovers to date.

Marvel's executive editor Tom Brevoort revealed that Last Days would show several characters from Captain America and Ms. Marvel to Loki and Magneto in their final adventures before the Marvel Universe comes to an end in Secret Wars, Warzones would focus on the individual domains, and Battleworld would be concerned with the infrastructure of the Battleworld as a whole.

== Plot ==
=== Issue One ===
In a last-ditch attempt to save the multiverse from total annihilation, Doctor Doom, Doctor Strange, and the Molecule Man confront the Beyonders, the all-powerful entities responsible for the multiverse's destruction. As the final incursion of Earth-1610 and Earth-616 begins, heroes from each universe confront one another. Mister Fantastic and the Maker (the Mister Fantastic of Earth-1610) make plans to survive the cataclysm with a small group of colleagues; Mister Fantastic selects heroes and important scientists, while the Maker intends to save himself and the Cabal.

The Maker sends a doomsday weapon and the Children of Tomorrow to Earth-616. Black Bolt, Rocket Raccoon, Groot, Black Widow, Spider-Woman, and Beast are killed, and Stark Tower is destroyed. Meanwhile, the Kingpin hosts a viewing party of the incursion for villains, but the festivities are interrupted by the Punisher, who kills all the villains. Manifold begins teleporting heroes to the lifeboat -- a special ship designed to survive the final incursion. Cyclops merges with the Phoenix Force and destroys the Children of Tomorrow before being teleported onto the ship. Mister Fantastic and Black Panther pilot the ship to the center of the incursion. A hull breach occurs, separating the part of the ship carrying the Invisible Woman, the Thing and most of the young Future Foundation. They are destroyed by the incursion before Mister Fantastic can rescue them. The world fades to white as the two Earths collide. Doctor Doom's mask appears out of the white void, before the white turns to black. The life raft comes to rest on a mysterious planet.

=== Issue Two ===
A new Thor is shown joining the Thor Corps, a police force composed of different versions of Thor. The young Thor from the Battleworld domain of Higher Avalon tells the story of how God Emperor Doom created the Earth and the universe. The Thor of Higher Avalon and Old Thor travel to Bar Sinister to bring its baron Mister Sinister to Castle Doom, where Doom holds court from his throne on the World Tree. Sinister is charged with secretly aligning with Baron Hyperion of Utopolis in opposition to Higher Avalon. Sinister chooses to face his accuser Brian Braddock in battle and defeats him. Before he can deal the killing blow, Doom intervenes. To save his brother, Baron James Braddock confesses to crimes against Doom. Doom banishes James to the Shield, a massive wall that protects Doom's realm from outside horrors. Thor of Higher Avalon and Old Thor escort Baron James to the Shield, where he jumps into the Deadlands and dies fighting zombies.

In the Kingdom of Utopolis, Minister Alex Power is brought to an object uncovered by an "earthquake": the life raft from Earth-1610. Valeria tells Sheriff Strange that the object is much older than the believed age of Earth. Strange tasks the Thor of Higher Avalon and Old Thor to enforce a quarantine around the discovery site. One of the Moloid diggers on site inadvertently opens the craft, and Old Thor is killed by weapons thrown from within. The young Thor flees to tell Strange what has happened. As he leaves, the Cabal and Maker emerge from the lifeboat. Thanos is told by a Moloid that they are in Battleworld.

=== Issue Three ===
Sheriff Strange informs God Emperor Doom of recent events in the domains of Battleworld. Before a statue of the Molecule Man, they reminisce how Doom had battled the Beyonders and managed to salvage various fragments of the Earths that were being destroyed. Strange is summoned to Utopolis by the Thor Corps to examine the Cabal's life raft. A group of Thors are sent to apprehend the Cabal. Once all the Thors, aside from the Thor of Higher Avalon, have left, Strange tells the hidden Miles Morales that he may come out of hiding. Miles reveals he snuck on to the ship just before the incursion destroyed his planet.

On the Isle of Agamotto, Sheriff Strange explains Battleworld to Miles, then reveals he has found the other life raft. The Thor of Higher Avalon opens the vessel and the survivors of Earth-616 exit stasis. Strange realizes the heroes are from his timeline when he sees his fellow Illuminati Black Panther and Mister Fantastic. Strange reveals they have been in stasis for eight years and that Doom saved them all when he created Battleworld. In Utopolis, the Cabal and the Maker are discovered by the Thor Corps.

=== Issue Four ===
In Utopolis, the Thor Corps battle Thanos, the Cabal, and the Maker. On the Isle of Agamotto, Sheriff Strange explains to the life rafters that the Beyonders were the ones behind the universes crashing together and that he and Doctor Doom were able to kill them and take their power. A wild boar version of Thor teleports to Castle Doom to report his findings. Strange arrives at the battle with the raft survivors. God Emperor Doom also teleports to the battle and unleashes his power against the Cabal and the surviving members of the life raft. Cyclops, powered by the Phoenix Force, confronts Doom and temporarily gains the upper hand. Doom recovers, snaps Cyclops' neck, and orders the invaders to surrender. Strange teleports the surviving members to safety. Enraged, Doom kills Strange with a blast of energy.

=== Issue Five ===
After Sheriff Strange's funeral, God Emperor Doom enters a realm located below the Doctor Strange statue and talks to the real Molecule Man, who lives there. It is explained that the Beyonders were the originators of reality, but eventually became harbingers of destruction. The Molecule Man was unique across the multiverse: a being whose presence in each reality represented a sliver of a single inter-dimensional entity. The Beyonders would initiate the end of a particular reality by detonating that reality's Molecule Man. Doom, Strange, and the Earth-616 Molecule Man had gathered Molecule Men from across the multiverse and combined them into a bomb, which they directed towards the unsuspecting Beyonders. The detonation killed the Beyonders and allowed the Earth-616 Molecule Man to absorb their power and channel it to Doom, who in turn created Battleworld.

Valeria's Justice Division of the Future Foundation prepares to hunt down the Earth-616 heroes and also the Cabal. Thor appears in Doomgard where the Thor Corps are located, Black Panther and Namor appear in Egyptia, Captain Marvel in Bar Sinister, and Black Swan in Doomstadt. At the end of the issue, Thanos appears at the base of the Shield.

=== Issue Six ===
Three weeks later, Battleworld is in disarray with several kingdoms in open rebellion. Someone called "the Prophet" has formed an army against God Emperor Doom, and has toppled the upper and lower kingdoms of Egyptia. Doom orders his most loyal Barons (Mister Sinister, Maestro, Apocalypse, and Madelyne Pryor) to deal with the threat of the Prophet. Of the other Cabal members, only Proxima Midnight and Corvus Glaive have been captured, while Black Swan offers to help Doom. The Foundation find the source of Doom's power and inform Valeria, who has become suspicious of her father.

Mister Fantastic and the Maker team up to find the source of God Emperor Doom's power, and send Spider-Man and Miles to infiltrate Castle Doom. The Spider-Men meet Valeria, who chooses not to go with them. Valeria demands to know who killed Sheriff Strange and Peter confirms Valeria's suspicions that no one from the raft was responsible. After entering a trapdoor under the Molecule Man's statue, the Spider-Men are confronted by the real Molecule Man. Meanwhile, Namor and Black Panther arrive at the Isle of Agamotto. Using the Key of Agamotto given to them by Strange, they are given access to powerful items Strange had collected over the years including the Siege Courageous and an Infinity Gauntlet that works only in Doomstadt.

Thanos, who had been captured by the Hel-Rangers, talks to the sentient structure that forms the Shield (a giant alternate version of Ben Grimm), and convinces him to reject God Emperor Doom and rise, causing the Shield to fall down.

=== Issue Seven ===
The Prophet, who is revealed to be Maximus, marches his troops to Castle Doom. Baron Sinister takes the chance to turn against Baroness Pryor, but is subsequently struck down by the former Baron Apocalypse. The Thor Corps joins the battle against God Emperor Doom, as Jane Foster has managed to convince her fellow Thors to fight against their god. Former Baron Maestro joins the battle with his army of Worldbreakers. The two Reed Richards use the fight ensuing on the steps of Castle Doom as cover to infiltrate the building and steal "the most valuable thing that's left from the Multiverse" from Doom. The Black Panther and Namor travel to the Deadlands for reinforcements and the Black Panther uses his title as the King of the Dead to convince the zombies to join the forces opposing Doom.

=== Issue Eight ===
Chaos continues on the outskirts of Castle Doom. Mister Fantastic, Maker, and Star-Lord fly to Castle Doom, but a Hulk causes their ship to crash. The Maestro calls God Emperor Doom out to face him, but is met instead by the giant Ben Grimm who is destroying everything in his path. Susan, Valeria, and one of the Black Swans save Doom. Grimm continues his rampage until Franklin and Galactus arrive. Franklin reveals Doom is his father. Ben realizes Franklin is the son of Susan and allows the Franklin-controlled Galactus to destroy him rather than fight the boy. Susan bursts into tears until Valeria asks Susan to come with her.

In Castle Doom, Star-Lord is attacked by Black Swan while he is repairing his ship. Star-Lord manages to prick his Groot 'toothpick' into the World-Tree, causing the toothpick to merge with the tree to form a giant Groot. Susan and Valeria head to the statues of the Molecule Man and Sheriff Strange, but stop when they see Mister Fantastic and Maker.

God Emperor Doom arrives on the battlefield and gives Thanos a chance to be a Baron. Thanos refuses the offer as he believes he is already a god, but God Emperor Doom rips out Thanos' skeleton. The battle continues until Captain Marvel spots the zombies coming from the remains of the Shield. Black Panther (with the Infinity Gauntlet) and Namor arrive, declaring to Doom that his reign is over.

=== Issue Nine ===
Namor and Black Panther battle with God Emperor Doom wielding the power of the Beyonders and the Black Panther wielding the Infinity Gauntlet. Susan does not recognize Mister Fantastic and accuses him of being one of the "murderers" of Sheriff Strange. Mister Fantastic reveals that Doom killed Strange. Mister Fantastic and Maker meet with Molecule Man, after which Maker betrays Mister Fantastic by trapping him in a temporal bubble that devolves him into an ape. Molecule Man intervenes, rescuing Mister Fantastic while splitting the Maker into meat slices. Back on the battlefield, Doom realizes Black Panther's fight is a distraction, and teleports to the Molecule Man's statue to confront Mister Fantastic.

God Emperor Doom tries to use his powers to destroy his rival, but he finds that Molecule Man has taken away most of his abilities so that the confrontation between the two will be fair. Mister Fantastic and Doom face off. Doom, exclaiming of how it always comes down to him and Mister Fantastic like this, begins gaining the upper hand by mocking Mister Fantastic for, as the genius that he is, not having been able to find a way to save the entire Multiverse. Mister Fantastic counters by calling Doom out for his insecurity, as the first thing that Doom did when he obtained the Beyonders' powers was to steal Mister Fantastic's life and family, making Doom confess that Mister Fantastic would have done a better job with the Beyonders' power. Hearing this, the Molecule Man transfers the Beyonders' power to Mister Fantastic, which destroys Battleworld. In the wake of the destruction, the Black Panther uses the Reality Gem to recreate and teleport himself to Wakanda. There, he finds three Wakandan prodigies (the same he talked to in New Avengers #1) to whom he tasks with granting wisdom to the stars.

Miles Morales awakens on the restored Earth-616, now known as Marvel's Earth Prime, along with his friends and his mother (who was brought back to life by the Molecule Man as gratitude for giving him a hamburger). Still shaken by the recent events, Miles goes on patrol with Peter as Spider-Man. Meanwhile, Mister Fantastic, Invisible Woman, Valeria, Franklin, the members of Future Foundation, and Molecule Man work to restore the Multiverse one reality at a time. In Latveria, Doctor Doom removes his mask, reveals his face is no longer disfigured, and laughs with joy.

== Battleworld ==
External image
- High-resolution map of Battleworld Newsarama. Retrieved May 19, 2015.

Following numerous incursions across the multiverse, the remains of various realities have been fused together to create a new Battleworld. Each domain is the incursion point from that reality's destruction, as this is all that remains from each one. All of these realities are known as domains and have the ability to interact with each other, except for three: the Deadlands, Perfection and New Xandar. These domains are separated from the rest by a giant wall called the Shield because they contain threats that, if set loose, would destroy all the others: zombies, Ultron drones, creatures that make up the Annihilation Wave, and an alternate reality version of Thanos trying to reconstruct the Infinity Gauntlet.

Each domain has an appointed leader called a Baron, who runs their domain with permission from God Emperor Doom, the Lord and Messiah of Battleworld. To ensure all domains remain separate from each other, the Thor Corps have been formed (containing all alternate versions of Thor) and they act as a police force for Battleworld under the leadership of Sheriff Strange. Those who transgress the borders are sent to the Shield to work there whilst those who spectacularly break this rule are sent into exile over the Shield into one of the three dangerous domains.

Battleworld is one of the three celestial bodies in its universe. The second celestial body and Battleworld's source of light is revealed to be the Human Torch himself who acts as the "Sun" after allowing Doom to lift him into the sky during the early days of Battleworld's creation and where he still remains today. The Sun orbits Battleworld instead of the other way around. The third celestial body is Knowhere, which orbits Battleworld as its "Moon". Apart from these celestial bodies, there were no other stars, until Singularity, a mysterious young girl who actually represents a pocket universe that gained sentience during the multiversal collapse, appeared to give her life to save the citizens of Arcadia from a horde of zombies, which returned the stars to its universe.

The reality where Battleworld was fashioned has since been dubbed as Earth-15513.

== Titles ==
=== Time Runs Out ===
Title	Issues	Collected editions	Issues reprinted	Creative team
Avengers / New Avengers	#35–44 / #24–33	Time Runs Out Vol. 1	Avengers (2012) #35–37, New Avengers (2013) #24–25	Writer; Jonathan Hickman; Artist; Various
Avengers / New Avengers	#35–44 / #24–33	Time Runs Out Vol. 2	Avengers (2012) #38–39, New Avengers (2013) #26–28	Writer; Jonathan Hickman; Artist; Various
Avengers / New Avengers	#35–44 / #24–33	Time Runs Out Vol. 3	Avengers (2012) #40–42, New Avengers (2013) #29–30	Writer; Jonathan Hickman; Artist; Various
Avengers / New Avengers	#35–44 / #24–33	Time Runs Out Vol. 4	Avengers (2012) #43–44, New Avengers (2013) #31–33	Writer; Jonathan Hickman; Artist; Various
Avengers World	#17–21	Before Time Runs Out	Avengers (2012) #34.2, Avengers World #17–21	Writer; Frank Barbiere; Artist; Marco Checchetto
Miles Morales: Ultimate Spider-Man	#12	Revelations	Miles Morales: Ultimate Spider-Man #6–12	Writer; Brian Michael Bendis; Artist; David Marquez

=== Last Days ===
Title	Issues	Collected editions	Issues reprinted	Creative team
Ant-Man: Last Days	#1	Secret Wars: Last Days of the Marvel Universe	Captain America and the Mighty Avengers #8–9, Loki: Agent of Asgard #14–17, Magneto (2014) #18–21, Black Widow (2014) #19–20, Ms. Marvel (2014) #16–19, Punisher (2014) #19–20, Silver Surfer (2014) #13–15, Ant-Man: Last Days #1, Silk (2015A) #7, Spider-Woman (2014) #10	Writer; Nick Spencer; Artist; Ramon Rosanos
Black Widow	#19–20	Secret Wars: Last Days of the Marvel Universe	Captain America and the Mighty Avengers #8–9, Loki: Agent of Asgard #14–17, Magneto (2014) #18–21, Black Widow (2014) #19–20, Ms. Marvel (2014) #16–19, Punisher (2014) #19–20, Silver Surfer (2014) #13–15, Ant-Man: Last Days #1, Silk (2015A) #7, Spider-Woman (2014) #10	Writer; Nathan Edmondson; Artist; Phil Noto
Captain America and the Mighty Avengers	#8–9	Secret Wars: Last Days of the Marvel Universe	Captain America and the Mighty Avengers #8–9, Loki: Agent of Asgard #14–17, Magneto (2014) #18–21, Black Widow (2014) #19–20, Ms. Marvel (2014) #16–19, Punisher (2014) #19–20, Silver Surfer (2014) #13–15, Ant-Man: Last Days #1, Silk (2015A) #7, Spider-Woman (2014) #10	Writer; Al Ewing; Artist; Luke Ross
Loki: Agent of Asgard	#14–17	Secret Wars: Last Days of the Marvel Universe	Captain America and the Mighty Avengers #8–9, Loki: Agent of Asgard #14–17, Magneto (2014) #18–21, Black Widow (2014) #19–20, Ms. Marvel (2014) #16–19, Punisher (2014) #19–20, Silver Surfer (2014) #13–15, Ant-Man: Last Days #1, Silk (2015A) #7, Spider-Woman (2014) #10	Writer; Al Ewing; Artist; Lee Garbett
Magneto	#18–21	Secret Wars: Last Days of the Marvel Universe	Captain America and the Mighty Avengers #8–9, Loki: Agent of Asgard #14–17, Magneto (2014) #18–21, Black Widow (2014) #19–20, Ms. Marvel (2014) #16–19, Punisher (2014) #19–20, Silver Surfer (2014) #13–15, Ant-Man: Last Days #1, Silk (2015A) #7, Spider-Woman (2014) #10	Writer; Cullen Bunn; Artist; Javi Fernandez
Ms. Marvel	#16–19	Secret Wars: Last Days of the Marvel Universe	Captain America and the Mighty Avengers #8–9, Loki: Agent of Asgard #14–17, Magneto (2014) #18–21, Black Widow (2014) #19–20, Ms. Marvel (2014) #16–19, Punisher (2014) #19–20, Silver Surfer (2014) #13–15, Ant-Man: Last Days #1, Silk (2015A) #7, Spider-Woman (2014) #10	Writer; G. Willow Wilson; Artist; Adrian Alphona
The Punisher	#19–20	Secret Wars: Last Days of the Marvel Universe	Captain America and the Mighty Avengers #8–9, Loki: Agent of Asgard #14–17, Magneto (2014) #18–21, Black Widow (2014) #19–20, Ms. Marvel (2014) #16–19, Punisher (2014) #19–20, Silver Surfer (2014) #13–15, Ant-Man: Last Days #1, Silk (2015A) #7, Spider-Woman (2014) #10	Writer; Nathan Edmondson; Artist; Mitch Gerads
Silk	#7	Secret Wars: Last Days of the Marvel Universe	Captain America and the Mighty Avengers #8–9, Loki: Agent of Asgard #14–17, Magneto (2014) #18–21, Black Widow (2014) #19–20, Ms. Marvel (2014) #16–19, Punisher (2014) #19–20, Silver Surfer (2014) #13–15, Ant-Man: Last Days #1, Silk (2015A) #7, Spider-Woman (2014) #10	Writer; Robbie Thompson; Artist; Tania Ford
Silver Surfer	#13–15	Secret Wars: Last Days of the Marvel Universe	Captain America and the Mighty Avengers #8–9, Loki: Agent of Asgard #14–17, Magneto (2014) #18–21, Black Widow (2014) #19–20, Ms. Marvel (2014) #16–19, Punisher (2014) #19–20, Silver Surfer (2014) #13–15, Ant-Man: Last Days #1, Silk (2015A) #7, Spider-Woman (2014) #10	Writer; Dan Slott; Artist; Michael Allred
Spider-Woman	#10	Secret Wars: Last Days of the Marvel Universe	Captain America and the Mighty Avengers #8–9, Loki: Agent of Asgard #14–17, Magneto (2014) #18–21, Black Widow (2014) #19–20, Ms. Marvel (2014) #16–19, Punisher (2014) #19–20, Silver Surfer (2014) #13–15, Ant-Man: Last Days #1, Silk (2015A) #7, Spider-Woman (2014) #10	Writer; Dennis Hopeless; Artist; Natacha Bustos

=== Secret Wars ===
Title	Issues	Collected editions	Issues reprinted	Creative team
Secret Wars	Free Comic Book Day 2015 (Secret Wars) #1(#0), #1–9	Secret Wars	Secret Wars (2015) #0–9	Writer; Jonathan Hickman; Artist; Esad Ribić

=== Battleworld ===
Title	Issues	Collected editions	Issues reprinted	Creative team
Age of Ultron vs. Marvel Zombies	#1–4	Age of Ultron vs. Marvel Zombies	Age of Ultron vs. Marvel Zombies #1–4, Age of Ultron #1	Writer; James Robinson; Artist; Steve Pugh
Ghost Racers	#1–4	Ghost Racers	Ghost Racers #1–4, Ghost Rider (1973) #35, material from Secret Wars: Secret Love #1	Writer; Felipe Smith; Artist; Juan Gedeon
Inhumans Attilan Rising	#1–5	Inhumans: Attilan Rising	Inhumans: Attilan Rising #1–5	Writer; Charles Soule; Artist; John Timms
Marvel Zombies	#1–4	Marvel Zombies: Battleworld	Marvel Zombies (2015) #1–4, Marvel Zombies (2006) #1	Writer; Si Spurrier; Artist; Kev Walker
Master of Kung Fu	#1–4	Master of Kung Fu: Battleworld	Master of Kung Fu (2015) #1–4, 5 Ronin #2	Writer; Haden Blackman; Artist; Dalibor Talajic
Red Skull	#1–3	Red Skull	Red Skull #1–3, Captain America (1968) #367, Captain America (1998) #14	Writer; Joshua Williamson; Artist; Luca Pizzari
Runaways	#1–4	Runaways: Battleworld	Runaways (2015) #1–4, Secret Wars: Secret Love #1	Writer; ND Stevenson; Artist; Sanford Greene
Secret Wars Journal	#1–5	Secret Wars Journal: Battleworld	Secret Wars Journal #1–5, Secret Wars: Battleworld #1–4, Howard the Human #1, Secret Wars Agents of Atlas #1	Writer; Various; Artist; Various
Secret Wars: Battleworld	#1–4	Secret Wars Journal: Battleworld	Secret Wars Journal #1–5, Secret Wars: Battleworld #1–4, Howard the Human #1, Secret Wars Agents of Atlas #1	Writer; Various; Artist; Various
Secret Wars: Secret Love	#1	Runaways: Battleworld	Runaways (2015) #1–4, Secret Wars: Secret Love #1	Writer; Various; Artist; Various
Siege	#1–4	Siege: Battleworld	Siege (2015) #1–4, Uncanny X-Men (2011) #9–10	Writer; Kieron Gillen; Artist; Filipe Andrade
Star-Lord & Kitty Pryde	#1–3	Star-Lord and Kitty Pryde	Star-Lord & Kitty Pryde #1–3, Generation Next #1, Guardians of the Galaxy & X-Men: The Black Vortex Omega #1	Writer; Sam Humphries; Artist; Alti Firmansyah
Thors	#1–4	Thors	Thors #1–4, Thor (1966) #364–365	Writer; Jason Aaron; Artist; Chris Sprouse
Ultimate End	#1–5	Ultimate End	Ultimate End #1–5	Writer; Brian Michael Bendis; Artist; Mark Bagley

=== Warzones ===
Title	Issues	Collected editions	Issues reprinted	Creative team
1602: Witch Hunter Angela	#1–4	1602: Witch Hunter Angela	1602: Witch Hunter Angela #1–4, 1602 #1	Writer; Kieron Gillen; Artist; Marguerite Bennett and Stephanie Hans
1872	#1–4	Marvel 1872	1872 #1–4, Avengers (1963) #80, Marvel Comics Presents #170	Writer; Gerry Duggan; Artist; Nik Virella
A-Force	#1–5	A-Force Vol. 0: Warzones	A-Force #1–5	Writer; G. Willow Wilson and Marguerite Bennett; Artist; Jorge Molina
Age of Apocalypse	#1–5	Age of Apocalypse: Warzones	Age of Apocalypse (2015) #1–5	Writer; Fabian Nicieza; Artist; Gerardo Sandoval
Amazing Spider-Man: Renew Your Vows	#1–5	Amazing Spider-Man: Renew Your Vows	Amazing Spider-Man: Renew Your Vows #1–5, material from Spider-Verse #2	Writer; Dan Slott; Artist; Adam Kubert
Armor Wars	#1–5 #1/2	Armor Wars: Warzones	Armor Wars #1–5, #1/2	Writer; James Robinson; Artist; Marcio Takara and Mark Bagley
Captain Britain and the Mighty Defenders	#1–2	Captain America and the Mighty Avengers Vol. 2: Last Day	Captain America and the Mighty Avengers #8–9, Captain Britain & the Mighty Defenders #1–2, Avengers Assemble #15AU	Writer; Al Ewing; Artist; Alan Davis
Captain Marvel & the Carol Corps	#1–4	Captain Marvel and the Carol Corps	Captain Marvel and the Carol Corps #1–4, Captain Marvel (2012) #17	Writer; Kelly Sue DeConnick, Kelly Thompson; Artist; David Lopez
Civil War	#1–5	Civil War: Warzones	Civil War (2015) #1–5	Writer; Charles Soule; Artist; Leinil Yu
Deadpool's Secret Secret Wars	#1–4	Deadpool's Secret Secret Wars	Deadpool's Secret Secret Wars #1–4, Marvel Super Heroes Secret Wars #1	Writer; Cullen Bunn; Artist; Matteo Lolli
E Is for Extinction	#1–4	E Is for Extinction: Warzones	E Is for Extinction #1–4, New X-Men (2001) #114	Writer; Chris Burnham; Artist; Ramon Villalobos
Future Imperfect	#1–5	Future Imperfect: Warzones	Future Imperfect #1–5, Secret Wars: Battleworld #4	Writer; Peter David; Artist; Greg Land
Giant-Size Little Marvel: AvX	#1–4	Giant-Size Little Marvel: AvX	Giant-Size Little Marvel: AvX #1–4, A-Babies vs. X-Babies #1	Writer; Skottie Young; Artist; Skottie Young
Guardians of Knowhere	#1–4	Guardians of Knowhere	Guardians of Knowhere #1–4, New Avengers: Illuminati (2007) #3	Writer; Brian Michael Bendis; Artist; Mike Deodato
Hail HYDRA	#1–4	Hail HYDRA	Hail HYDRA #1–4, Hank Johnson, Agent of HYDRA #1	Writer; Rick Remender; Artist; Roland Boschi
Hank Johnson, Agent of HYDRA	#1	Hail HYDRA	Hail HYDRA #1–4, Hank Johnson, Agent of HYDRA #1	Writer; David Mandel; Artist; Michael Walsh
House of M	#1–4	House of M: Warzones	House of M (2015) #1–4, House of M (2005) #1	Writer; Dennis Hopeless; Artist; Marco Failla
Howard the Human	#1	Secret Wars Journal: Battleworld	Secret Wars Journal #1–5, Secret Wars: Battleworld #1–4, Howard the Human #1, Secret Wars Agents of Atlas #1	Writer; Skottie Young; Artist; Skottie Young
Inferno	#1–5	Inferno: Warzones	Inferno #1–5	Writer; Dennis Hopeless; Artist; Javier Garron
Infinity Gauntlet	#1–5	Infinity Gauntlet: Warzones	Infinity Gauntlet (2015) #1–5	Writer; Gerry Duggan and Dustin Weaver; Artist; Dustin Weaver
Korvac Saga	#1–4	Korvac Saga: Warzones	Guardians 3000 #6–8, Korvac Saga #1–4	Writer; Dan Abnett; Artist; Otto Schmidt
M.O.D.O.K.: Assassin	#1–5	M.O.D.O.K.: Assassin	M.O.D.O.K.: Assassin #1–5	Writer; Chris Yost; Artist; Amilcar Pinna
Mrs. Deadpool and the Howling Commandos	#1–4	Mrs. Deadpool and the Howling Commandos	Mrs. Deadpool and the Howling Commandos #1–4, Werewolf by Night (1972) #1	Writer; Gerry Duggan; Artist; Salvador Espin
Old Man Logan	#1–5	Old Man Logan Vol. 0 – Warzones	Old Man Logan #1–5	Writer; Brian Michael Bendis; Artist; Andrea Sorrentino
Planet Hulk	#1–5	Planet Hulk: Warzones	Planet Hulk #1–5	Writer; Sam Humphries; Artist; Marc Laming
Secret Wars 2099	#1–5	Secret Wars 2099	Secret Wars 2099 #1–5	Writer; Peter David; Artist; Will Sliney
Secret Wars Agents of Atlas	#1	Secret Wars Journal: Battleworld	Secret Wars Journal #1–5, Secret Wars: Battleworld #1–4, Howard the Human #1, Secret Wars: Agents of Atlas #1	Writer; Tom Taylor; Artist; Steve Pugh
"Spider-Island"	#1–5	Spider-Island: Warzones	Spider-Island (2015) #1–5	Writer; Tom DeFalco and Christos Gage; Artist; Paco Diaz
Spider-Verse	#1–5	Spider-Verse: Warzones	Spider-Verse (2015B) #1–5	Writer; Mike Costa; Artist; Andre Aruajo
Squadron Sinister	#1–4	Squadron Sinister	Squadron Sinister #1–4, Avengers (1963) #69–70	Writer; Marc Guggenheim; Artist; Carlos Pacheco
Weirdworld	#1–5	Weirdworld Vol. 0: Warzones	Weirdworld #1–5	Writer; Jason Aaron; Artist; Mike del Mundo
Where Monsters Dwell	#1–5	Where Monsters Dwell: Phantom Eagle Flies the Savage Skies	Where Monsters Dwell #1–5	Writer; Garth Ennis; Artist; Russ Braun
X-Men '92	#1–4	X-Men '92	X-Men '92 #1–4	Writer; Chris Sims and Chad Bowers; Artist; Scott Koblish
X-Tinction Agenda	#1–4	X-Tinction Agenda: Warzones	X-Tinction Agenda #1–4, Uncanny X-Men (1981) #270	Writer; Marc Guggenheim; Artist; Carmine Di Giandomenico
Years of Future Past	#1–5	X-Men: Years of Future Past	Years of Future Past #1–5	Writer; Marguerite Bennett; Artist; Mike Norton

=== Additional stories ===
Title	Issues	Collected editions	Issues reprinted	Creative team
Secret Wars: Official Guide to the Marvel Multiverse	#1 – All-new collection of Official Handbook of the Marvel Universe profiles – featuring characters significant to the Secret Wars storyline and from throughout the Marvel Multiverse.	Uncollected		Writer; Mike O'Sullivan and the OHOTMU Team; Artist; Various
Secret Wars Too	#1	Secret Wars Too	Secret Wars, Too #1; Wha...Huh? #1; Ultimate Civil War: Spider-Ham #1; Captain America: Who Won't Wield the Shield #1; Shame Itself #1; Marvel Now What?! #1; material from World War Hulk: Front Line #2–5, Original Sins #5, Marvel 75th Anniversary Celebration #1.	Writer; Various; Artist; Various

== Other versions ==
What If...? Secret Wars featured a universe depicting what would happen if the Ultimate universe survived the event instead of Earth-616. In this version, Earth-616 Peter is brought to the Ultimate universe after giving the Molecule Man a pork bun. Nick Fury claims that he destroyed the portal (that they used in Spider-Men) because one more excursion or incursion on their world would collapse their reality. With their world having less superhumans available due to the events of Cataclysm and Ultimatum, Peter becomes an agent of S.H.I.E.L.D. and operates as this world's Scarlet Spider.

After a few months, Peter begins dying of radiation poisoning as nuclear physics operate differently on Earth-1610. To save his life, Miles and other friends of Earth-1610 Peter (Kitty Pryde, Iceman, and Human Torch) break into the Triskelion to help Earth-616 Peter make it to the portal. They find the portal active and guarded by the Future Foundation (Invisible Woman, the Thing, and Machine Man), who say they are using it as a window to spy on someone and can't go in. As Peter's allies battle the Future Foundation, he goes into the portal and encounters the Maker, who now has the Beyonder's powers after killing the Earth-616 Mister Fantastic and Doom and is in the process of remaking the multiverse. In contrast to Earth-616 Reed, the Maker is still trying to create the perfect world and instead of restoring the original universes, creates new ones using his own reality as a control variable.

The Maker reveals to Peter he's unable to recreate Earth-616 because it can survive the presence of superhumans, which he is unable to replicate using Earth-1610 as a base. As he sends Peter back to the Ultimate universe, the Triskelion explodes after Kitty phases through Machine Man during their fight, triggering a self-defense mechanism that explodes and kills hundreds of people on board, leaving Miles, Kitty, and Invisible Woman as the only survivors. With weeks left before he dies and S.H.I.E.L.D. destroyed, Peter reaches out to Daily Bugle editor-in-chief Ben Urich to start a movement involving the remaining superheroes and normal people with "more power than they realize" to ensure this world's survival.

== Reception ==
According to review aggregator Comic Book Roundup, Issue #0 received an average score of 7.9 out of 10 based on 5 reviews. Mat Elfring from Comic Vine wrote "If you're a Marvel fan, this book is a must have, for the SECRET WARS part. Sure, the ending doesn't feel like it works as smoothly as everything else, but this is a great catch-up to the upcoming event and it's great to see it all through the eyes of the Future Foundation."

Issue #1 received an average score of 8.2 out of 10 based on 46 reviews. Jeremy Matcho from All-Comic wrote "This is how an event should start. Hickman blew the gates off of this issue and laid down the bar for every event issue in the future. Great writing mixed with great art and even better build up makes Secret Wars a can't miss read! "

Issue #2 received an average score of 8.5 out of 10 based on 40 reviews. Tony 'G-Man' Guerrero from Comic Vine wrote "There's so much to see here. It's not just hero fighting hero. The other areas of Battleworld are being set up but there's a deep story going on here as well. Hickman, like the 'god' character we see here is creating a fascinating story with the idea of Battleworld and how each area relates to one another. The more you see, the more you want to see. Hickman makes it hard not to be excited. Esad Ribic's art and Ive Svorcina's colors gives this a great vibe. If you are craving more big fights, it looks like you'll be getting some of that as well as Hickman continues to set the stage for big things"

Issue #3 received an average score of 8.6 out of 10 based on 34 reviews. Chuck from Chuck's Comic of the day wrote "The slam on the original Secret Wars maxi-series was that the story was simplistic. You'll find no such complaints here."

== In other media ==
=== Film ===
- Doctor Strange and an alternate-world Christine Palmer visit an Earth affected by an Incursion in the Marvel Cinematic Universe movie Doctor Strange in the Multiverse of Madness. At the end of the film, Clea, a sorcerer from the Dark Dimension, informs Strange that his actions from the film have caused another incursion. Strange follows Clea into the Dark Dimension.
  - In July 2022, at San Diego Comic-Con, producer and head of Marvel Studios, Kevin Feige, announced that a film adaptation, Avengers: Secret Wars was in development as part of Phase Six of the Marvel Cinematic Universe (MCU), and was to be released on May 1, 2026, directly following Avengers: The Kang Dynasty on May 2, 2025. In June 2023, Secret Wars was rescheduled to be released on May 7, 2027, following Kang Dynasty on May 1, 2026. At Comic-Con in 2024, Kevin Feige announced a change from Marvel's previously announced Avengers: The Kang Dynasty to Avengers: Doomsday, followed by Avengers: Secret Wars, with directors Anthony and Joe Russo set to return to the MCU after Avengers: Endgame. In May 2025, both Doomsday and Secret Wars were pushed back to December 18, 2026 and December 17, 2027 respectively.

=== Video games ===
- The "Secret Wars" version of various Marvel characters appear as playable or non-playable in the mobile game Marvel: Future Fight.
- Characters based from the "Secret Wars" and the "Spider-Island" versions appear in the mobile game Spider-Man Unlimited.
- The "Secret Wars" storyline is featured in Marvel: Mighty Heroes.
- Incursions were incorporated into the gameplay and plots of Marvel: Avengers Alliance.
- Characters from the "Secret Wars" are available in the mobile game Marvel: Battle Lines.
- God Emperor Doom appears as the final boss in the Expansion Pass of Marvel Ultimate Alliance 3: The Black Order.
- Marvel Realm of Champions is set on the patchwork Battleworld made from various alternate Earths, which is divided into "Houses" ruled by the "Barons".
- Marvel Future Revolution adapts the storyline directly, depicting collisions between alternate Earths that obliterate them both, which in-game is called "Convergence". The heroes of one Earth attempt to save their Earth, but fail. Vision then sacrifices himself to merge several Earths together peacefully into a single Primary Earth, which contains regions such as technologically advanced New Stark City or Earth colonized by refugees from Xandar.

== See also ==
- Convergence
- List of All-New, All-Different Marvel publications
- Doctor Strange in the Multiverse of Madness
