= List of All-New, All-Different Marvel publications =

In October 2015, Marvel Comics relaunched their entire line of publications, dubbing the new publishing initiative as the All-New, All-Different Marvel. The initiative consisted of a new imprint of titles in a rebooted Marvel Universe post-"Secret Wars".

In October 2016, following the events of Civil War II, Marvel launched another publishing initiative called "Marvel NOW 2.0", although the continuity continued to exist under the new initiative. New titles were launched while some titles under the "All-New, All-Different Marvel" initiative were rebranded but retained their numbering.

In March 2017, various titles from the X-Men and Inhumans communities are relaunched and rebranded, as well as new titles being added, as an aftermath of Inhumans vs. X-Men. This initiative was called "ResurrXion".

This list contains all titles released by Marvel Comics that are related to its "All-New, All-Different Marvel" relaunch.

== Titles ==
=== All-New, All-Different Marvel ===
==== Current on-going series / volumes ====
Title	Publication Date	Initial Creative Team	Notes / References
All-New Wolverine (rebranded in ResurrXion)	November 2015 – present	Writer; Tom Taylor; Artist; David Lopez	
Amazing Spider-Man	October 2015 – present	Writer; Dan Slott; Artist; Giuseppe Camuncoli	
Captain America: Sam Wilson	October 2015 – present	Writer; Nick Spencer; Artist; Daniel Acuña	
Daredevil (rebranded in Marvel NOW 2.0)	December 2015 – present	Writer; Charles Soule; Artist; Ron Garney	
Deadpool (rebranded in Marvel NOW 2.0)	November 2015 – present	Writer; Gerry Duggan; Artist; Mike Hawthorne	
Doctor Strange	October 2015 – present	Writer; Jason Aaron; Artist; Chris Bachalo	
Mighty Thor (rebranded in Marvel NOW 2.0)	November 2015 – present	Writer; Jason Aaron; Artist; Russell Dauterman	
Moon Girl And Devil Dinosaur (rebranded in Marvel NOW 2.0)	November 2015 – present	Writer; Amy Reeder and Brandon Montclare; Artist; Natacha Bustos	
Ms. Marvel (rebranded in Marvel NOW 2.0)	November 2015 – present	Writer; G. Willow Wilson; Artist; Takeshi Miyazawa and Adrian Alphona	
Silk	November 2015 – present	Writer; Robbie Thompson; Artist; Stacey Lee	
Spider-Gwen	October 2015 – present	Writer; Jason Latour; Artist; Robbi Rodriguez	
Spider-Man 2099	October 2015 – present	Writer; Peter David; Artist; Will Sliney	
Unbeatable Squirrel Girl	October 2015 – present	Writer; Ryan North; Artist; Erica Henderson	
Uncanny Avengers (rebranded in Marvel NOW 2.0)	October 2015 – present	Writer; Gerry Duggan; Artist; Ryan Stegman	
==== Discontinued series / volumes ====
Title	Publication Date	Initial Creative Team	Notes / References
All-New, All-Different Avengers	November 2015 – October 2016 (1-15)	Writer; Mark Waid; Artist; Mahmud Asrar and Adam Kubert	
All-New Hawkeye	November 2015 – April 2016 (1-6)	Writer; Jeff Lemire; Artist; Ramon Perez	
All-New Inhumans	December 2015 – September 2016 (1-11)	Writer; Charles Soule and James Asmus; Artist; Stefano Caselli	
All-New X-Men	December 2015 – March 2017 (1-19)	Writer; Dennis Hopeless; Artist; Mark Bagley	
Angela: Queen of Hel	October 2015 – April 2016 (1-7)	Writer; Marguerite Bennett; Artist; Kim Jacinto and Stephanie Han	
Astonishing Ant-Man	October 2015 – October 2016 (1-13)	Writer; Nick Spencer; Artist; Ramon Rosanas	
Black Knight	November 2015 – March 2016 (1-5)	Writer; Frank Tieri; Artist; Luca Pizzari	
Carnage	November 2015 – January 2017 (1-16)	Writer; Gerry Conway; Artist; Mike Perkins	
Contest of Champions	October 2015 – July 2016 (1-10)	Writer; Al Ewing; Artist; Paco Medina	
Drax	November 2015 – September 2016 (1-11)	Writer; Al Ewing; Artist; Paco Medina	
Extraordinary X-Men	November 2015 – March 2017 (1-20)	Writer; Jeff Lemire; Artist; Humberto Ramos	
Guardians of the Galaxy (rebranded in Marvel NOW 2.0)	October 2015 – April 2017 (1-19)	Writer; Brian Michael Bendis; Artist; Valerio Schitti	
Hercules	November 2015 – April 2016 (1-6)	Writer; Dan Abnett; Artist; Luke Ross	
Howard the Duck	November 2015 – October 2016 (1-11)	Writer; Chip Zdarsky; Artist; Joe Quinones	
Howling Commandos of S.H.I.E.L.D	October 2015 – March 2016 (1-6)	Writer; Frank Barbiere; Artist; Brent Schoonover	
Illuminati	November 2015 – May 2016 (1-7)	Writer; Josh Williamson; Artist; Shawn Crystal	
Invincible Iron Man	October 2015 – October 2016 (1-14)	Writer; Brian Michael Bendis; Artist; David Marquez	
Karnak	October 2015 – February 2017 (1-6)	Writer; Warren Ellis; Artist; Gerardo Zaffino	
New Avengers	October 2015 – November 2016 (1-18)	Writer; Al Ewing; Artist; Gerardo Sandoval	
Nova (relaunched in Marvel NOW 2.0)	November 2015 – September 2016 (1-18)	Writer; Sean Ryan; Artist; Cory Smith	
Spider-Woman (relaunched in Marvel NOW 2.0)	November 2015 – March 2017 (1-17)	Writer; Dennis Hopeless; Artist; Javier Rodriguez	
Star-Lord	November 2015 – June 2016 (1-8)	Writer; Sam Humphries; Artist; Javier Garron	
Ultimates	November 2015 – October 2016 (1-12)	Writer; Al Ewing; Artist; Kenneth Rocafort	
Uncanny Inhumans	October 2015 – March 2017 (1-20)	Writer; Charles Soule; Artist; Steve McNiven	
Venom: Spaceknight	November 2015 – October 2016 (1-13)	Writer; Robbie Thompson; Artist; Ariel Olivetti	
Vision	November 2015 – October 2016 (1-12)	Writer; Tom King; Artist; Gabriel Hernandez Walta	
Web Warriors	November 2015 – September 2016 (1-11)	Writer; Mike Costa; Artist; David Bildeon	
==== One-shots ====
Title	Publication Date	Initial Creative Team	Notes / References
All-New, All-Different Point One	October 2016	Writer various Artist various	
Avengers	October 2016	Writer various Artist various	
