= List of Storm titles =

List of comic books about the Marvel Comics superhero

This is a list of titles featuring the Marvel Comics superhero Ororo Munroe. The character first appeared in Giant-Size X-Men #1 (May 1975). She was later given her own series in 1996. All stories presented in this list are published by Marvel Comics under their standard imprint, unless otherwise noted.

== Previous series ==
Ororo Munroe has had a number of ongoing series that have since ended:

- Magik: Storm & Illyana #1–4 (August 1983 – November 1983).
- Storm #1–4 (December 1995 – March 1996).
  - Storm (vol. 2) #1–6 (February 2006 – July 2006).
  - Storm (vol. 3) #1–11 (July 2014 – May 2015).
  - Storm (vol. 4) #1–5 (May 2023 – September 2023).
  - Storm (vol. 5) #1–Ongoing (October 2024 – Present).
- Ororo: Before the Storm #1–4 (June 2005 – September 2005).
- Storm and the Brotherhood of Mutants #1–3 (February 2023 – April 2023).

== One-shots ==
=== Mainstream continuity ===
- Spider-Man, Storm and Power Man (January 1982).
- X-Men: Curse of the Mutants - Storm & Gambit (August 2010).
- Giant-Size X-Men: Storm (September 2020). The comic was written by Jonathan Hickman, with artwork by Russell Dauterman.
- Storm: Lifedream (January 2025). The comic was written by Angélique Roché, John Jennings, Curtis Baxter, and Brittney Morris, with artwork by Karen S. Darboe and Edwin Galmon.

== Reception – Series ==
=== Mainstream continuity ===
==== Ororo: Before the Storm (2005) ====
Diamond Comic Distributors reported that Ororo: Before the Storm #1 was the 97th best-selling comic book in June 2005. Ororo: Before the Storm #2 was the 105th best-selling comic book in July 2005.

Darby Harn of Screen Rant described Ororo: Before the Storm as "one of the best versions" of Storm's origin stories in a retrospective ranking of the character's best comic book arcs. He praised the series for its focus on Ororo Munroe's childhood tragedies, including the deaths of her parents, and for introducing Achmed el-Gibar as a father figure during her years in Cairo. Harn also noted the story's addition of a previously unexplored connection between Storm and the villain Apocalypse.

==== Storm (2006) ====
Diamond Comic Distributors reported that Storm #1 was the 61st best-selling comic book in February 2006. Storm #2 was the 92nd best-selling comic book in March 2006.

Jesse Schedeen of IGN described Eric Jerome Dickey's storyline in Storm #5 as a competent exploration of the romantic history between Storm and Black Panther. Schedeen noted that while some plot elements felt contrived and Storm was once again placed in a "trapped" scenario, the overall narrative was enjoyable. He concluded that Storm #5 stood out favorably compared to much of the contemporary Black Panther series.

==== Storm (2014) ====
Diamond Comic Distributors reported that Storm #1 was the 46th best-selling comic book in July 2014. Storm #2 was the 88th best-selling comic book in August 2014. The Storm: Make It Rain trade paperback was the 45th best-selling graphic novel in February 2015.

Meagan Damore of Comic Book Resources praised Storm #1, highlighting it as a strong beginning for the character's series. Damore commended Pak for balancing Storm's complex history with accessibility for new readers, noting his ability to move fluidly between large-scale political conflicts and smaller, personal moments. She emphasized that Pak portrays Storm as both powerful and flawed, with moments of arrogance and growth that deepen her characterization. Damore also complimented Ibanez's artwork for capturing Storm's full emotional range and for rendering both the Jean Grey School and Santo Marco with rich detail. Furthermore, she credited Ruth Redmond's colors for subtly enhancing the atmosphere of the issue. Damore added that the creative team delivered an inspiring and uplifting take on Storm with "subtlety and grace." Jeff Lake of IGN gave Storm #1 a grade of 8.3 out of 10. He praised Greg Pak's writing for presenting Ororo Munroe as both powerful and rebellious, highlighting her conviction and refusal to conform to restrictions. Lake noted that the issue effectively showcases multiple aspects of Storm's character—hero, protector, and goddess—though he felt that combining them all in one installment was not entirely successful. He observed that the debut focused more on character introduction than overarching plot, leaving the series' future direction unclear. Lake commended Victor Ibañez's artwork for capturing Storm's emotional range and for its detailed backgrounds and dynamic depictions of her powers, with Ruth Redmond's coloring enhancing the atmosphere. He noted that despite limited narrative setup, the strong character work and expressive art made Storm #1 a debut "worth checking out."

Eric Jerome Dickey, David Yardin & Lan Medina, and Jay Leisten & Sean Parsons won the Fan Award for Best Comic for their work on Storm at the 2007 Glyph Comics Awards.

==== Storm and the Brotherhood of Mutants (2023) ====
ComicHub reported that Storm and the Brotherhood of Mutants #1 was the 9th best-selling comic book in February 2023. The ComicHub Top 200 Comic Books sales chart reflects sales data collected from the ComicHub system at comic shops across the globe that sell American comics. This report was created based on information from more than 125 stores that used the ComicHub system during the reporting period. Storm and the Brotherhood of Mutants #2 was the 40th best-selling comic book in March 2023.

Chase Magnett of ComicBook.com noted that Storm & The Brotherhood of Mutants #1 effectively continued the Sins of Sinister crossover while establishing Storm's leadership and her team's dynamics. He praised Al Ewing's writing for combining intrigue and reversals with accelerated pacing, making the issue satisfying both as a standalone story and as part of the larger event. Magnett highlighted Paco Medina's art and Jay David Ramos' coloring for creating a cohesive visual style consistent with prior Krakoa-era X-Men events, balancing grim stakes with the sense of superhero adventure. He added that the issue set high expectations for the crossover and reinforced Storm's central role in the narrative.

==== Storm (2023) ====
ComicHub reported that Storm #1 was the 45th best-selling comic book in May 2023. The ComicHub Top 200 Comic Books sales chart reflects sales data collected from the ComicHub system at comic shops across the globe that sell American comics. This report was created based on information from more than 125 stores that used the ComicHub system during the reporting period. Storm #1 was the 129th best-selling comic book in June 2023.

Avery Kaplan of ComicsBeat called Storm #1 an "excellent first issue" that delivered both narrative and visual satisfaction. Kaplan noted that the comic provided a "satisfying chunk" of story through its extended 33-page length, balancing mutant battles, interpersonal conflicts, and lighter moments such as a beach sequence. She highlighted the issue's exploration of challenges to Storm's leadership from Kitty Pryde and Rogue, alongside Monroe's own identity crisis, as adding depth to the narrative. Kaplan commended the expressive artwork, detailed character designs, and inventive use of flashbacks, while also praising Ariana Maher's lettering for creative flourishes. I-j Wheaton of Comic Book Resources noted that Storm #1's script offered a "refreshing" contrast to contemporary X-Men storylines by focusing on character-driven drama rather than cosmic-scale plots. Wheaton praised Ann Nocenti's writing for exploring Storm's leadership during the Uncanny X-Men era, highlighting moments that unpack the intersections between her powers and her identity. He found the team drama occasionally contrived and the dialogue uneven, but considered the character exploration engaging. Wheaton described Sid Kotian's retro-inspired art as successfully evoking the style of 1960s X-Men, though at times inconsistent in anatomy. He further complimented Andrew Dalhouse's coloring for its effective use of light and shadow and Ariana Maher's lettering for clarity, particularly in the depiction of the new villain.

==== Storm (2024) ====
ComicHub reported that Storm #2 was the 36 best-selling comic book in November 2024. The ComicHub Top 200 Comic Books sales chart reflects sales data collected from the ComicHub system at comic shops across the globe that sell American comics. This report was created based on information from more than 125 stores that used the ComicHub system during the reporting period. Storm #3 was the 39th best-selling comic book in December 2024. Storm #4 was the 25th best-selling comic book in January 2025.

Jamie Lovett of ComicBook.com praised Storm #1 as one of the strongest attempts to establish Ororo Munroe as a solo superhero. He highlighted Murewa Ayodele's writing for embracing Storm's multifaceted history while positioning her firmly in the mold of a traditional superhero. Lovett noted that the debut balanced Storm's godlike power and compassion with moments of vulnerability, such as being injured during a nuclear plant disaster. He complimented Lucas Werneck's art for framing Storm in striking, almost divine imagery, while also grounding her humanity. Lovett noted that the issue set a strong foundation for the series, presenting Storm as a heroine defined by empathy, conviction, and a willingness to face uncomfortable truths. Louis Skye of WomenWriteAboutComics called Storm #1 "everything I want in a story featuring Storm." She highlighted Murewa Ayodele's script for blending action, politics, moral dilemmas, and hope while addressing the persistent prejudice mutants face from humanity. She noted that the story's themes of systemic failure and scapegoating resonated with real-world marginalized experiences, praising the series for returning to the X-Men's allegorical roots. Skye also commended Lucas Werneck's art and the coloring by Alex Guimarães and Fer Sifuentes-Sujo, describing Storm's portrayal as the "most beautiful and regal [she's] seen in ages," with particular praise for the attention to detail in character design.

== Reception – One-Shots ==
=== Mainstream continuity ===
==== X-Men: Curse of the Mutants - Storm & Gambit (2010) ====
Diamond Comic Distributors reported that X-Men: Curse of the Mutants - Storm & Gambit #1 was the 55th best-selling comic book in August 2010.

James Hunt of Comic Book Resources called X-Men: Curse of the Mutants - Storm & Gambit #1 the "best thing to come out with the Curse of the Mutants name attached." He praised Kim's writing for balancing humor and continuity, citing Storm's claustrophobia and Gambit's nickname for her as well-handled references that enriched the story. Hunt noted that while Storm's actions in the issue raised some inconsistencies with her portrayal elsewhere in the crossover, the overall script evoked the tone of classic runs by Chris Claremont and Grant Morrison. He also welcomed the return of Chris Bachalo on art, describing his work as the strongest it had been in years despite cramped panel layouts and the heavy use of multiple inkers and colorists. Hunt stated that the issue functioned well enough as a stand-alone story to recommend even to readers not following the larger event.

==== Giant-Size X-Men: Storm (2020) ====
Diamond Comic Distributors reported that Giant-Size X-Men: Storm #1 was the 22nd best-selling comic book in September 2020.

Theo Dwyer of Bleeding Cool praised Jonathan Hickman's script for blending existential questions with humor. Dwyer noted that Giant-Size X-Men: Storm #1 explores Storm's struggle with a technological disease while raising broader questions about mortality and resurrection in superhero comics, commending Hickman for balancing silliness with philosophical depth. He highlighted Russel Dauterman's art and Matthew Wilson's colors for their expressive and textured visuals, comparing their work favorably to their acclaimed run on Thor. Dwyer concluded that Giant-Size X-Men: Storm #1 stood out as both visually striking and "genuinely funny," distinguishing it within the X-Men line. Nicole Drum of ComicBook.com gav Giant-Size X-Men: Storm #1 a grade of 5 out of 5, calling it "exquisite." She praised Jonathan Hickman's writing for capturing Storm's regal presence and nuance, while also portraying supporting characters such as Emma Frost with accuracy. Drum highlighted the artwork by Russel Dauterman and Matthew Wilson as "lush and graceful," complimenting the balance of realistic character design and striking visuals. Although she noted that some of Storm's reflections on life leaned on cliché, Drum found that the issue was "truly glorious" from beginning to end.

==== Storm: Lifedream (2025) ====
ComicHub reported that Storm: Lifedream #1 was the 130th best-selling comic book in January 2025. The ComicHub Top 200 Comic Books sales chart reflects sales data collected from the ComicHub system at comic shops across the globe that sell American comics. This report was created based on information from more than 125 stores that used the ComicHub system during the reporting period.

David Brooke of AIPT Comics praised Storm: Lifedream #1 as a "beautiful celebration of Ororo Munroe's legacy." He highlighted the comic's exploration of Storm's history, from her joining the X-Men to her godlike powers and personal struggles, noting that her emotions serve as both a tether to her humanity and a conduit for her abilities. Brooke complimented the multi-artist approach for maintaining a consistent focus on Storm while contributing unique stylistic flourishes. He also praised the color work for emphasizing Storm's presence and powers, and the writers for effectively framing the narrative within the Marvel's Voices anthology. Brooke noted that the issue, complemented by creator interviews and reflections on Storm's character, made Lifedream "truly special" and a meaningful addition to her legacy. B. Radtz of Comic Watch called Storm: Lifedream #1 a "beautiful walk down memory lane” for the character's 50th anniversary. Radtz highlighted the anthology's structure, with each chapter showcasing pivotal moments in Ororo Munroe's life, from her early tragedies to her time in Asgard, while noting that some chapters, such as those by Curtis Baxter and Charles Stewart III, were less emotionally impactful. He praised the artwork by Alitha Martinez and Edwin Galmon in particular, describing their depictions of Storm as graceful and visually striking. Radtz observed that the issue was primarily aimed at longtime readers and might confuse newcomers due to its coverage of multiple eras, but found that the artistic contributions made it a rewarding retrospective.

== Collected editions ==
Title	Material collected	Publication date	ISBN
X-Men: Storm by Warren Ellis & Terry Dodson	Storm (vol. 1) #1–4	October 2013	978-0785185017
X-Men: Worlds Apart	X-Men: Worlds Apart #1–4, Black Panther (vol. 4) #26, and material from Marvel Team-Up #100	December 2009	978-0785135333
Astonishing X-Men: Storm	Storm (vol. 2) #1–6	January 2008	978-0785119562
Astonishing X-Men: Ororo – Before The Storm	Ororo – Before The Storm #1–4	December 2005	978-0785118190
X-Men: Curse of the Mutants: Mutants vs. Vampires	X-Men: Curse Of The Mutants - Storm & Gambit and X-Men: Curse Of The Mutants - Smoke & Blood, X-Men: Curse Of The Mutants - Blade, X-Men Vs. Vampires #1-2, Uncanny X-Men #159	March 2011	978-0785152941
Storm Vol. 1: Make it Rain	Storm (vol. 3) #1–5	March 2015	978-0785191612
Storm Vol. 2: Bring the Thunder	Storm (vol. 3) #6–11	July 2015	978-0785191629
Giant-Size X-Men By Jonathan Hickman	Giant-Size X-Men: Storm #1 and Giant-Size X-Men: Magneto #1, Jean Grey and Emma Frost #1, Nightcrawler #1, Fantomex #1,	January 2021	978-1302925833
