= List of further education colleges in Wales =

List of colleges

This is a list of current further education colleges and sixth form colleges in Wales.

Further education colleges offer courses for adult learners, including some academic qualifications, but mainly vocational studies and work-based learning. Sixth form colleges mainly offer academic qualifications such as A Levels for people between the ages of 16 and 19.

Some further education colleges in Wales offer higher education courses such as degrees and diplomas, usually in conjunction with a nearby university.

Welsh colleges are funded primarily by the Welsh Government, with subsidised tuition fees paid by individual students or their sponsors.

College	Location	Notes
Bridgend College	Bridgend, Cardiff, Maesteg, Pencoed,	
Cardiff and Vale College	Cardiff, Barry	Formed in August 2011 as a result of a merger between Coleg Glan Hafren and Barry College
Cardiff Sixth Form College	Cardiff	An independent school established in 2004
Coleg Cambria	Deeside (Connah's Quay), Northop, Llysfasi and Yale Grove Park/Bersham Road (Wrexham)	Formed in August 2013 as a merger of Deeside College and Yale College
Coleg Ceredigion	Aberystwyth, Cardigan	Constituent of University of Wales, Trinity Saint David
Coleg Gwent	Newport, Crosskeys, Ebbw Vale, Pontypool, Usk	Largest FE college in Wales
Coleg Harlech	Harlech	Part of Adult Learning Wales
Grŵp Llandrillo Menai	Main campuses in Bangor, Rhos-on-Sea, and Dolgellau	Formed in April 2012 as a merger of Coleg Llandrillo and Coleg Menai.
Coleg Sir Gâr	Carmarthen, Llanelli, Ammanford, Llandeilo	Constituent of University of Wales, Trinity Saint David
Coleg y Cymoedd	Aberdare, Llwynypia, Nantgarw, Rhymney, Ystrad Mynach	Formed in August 2013 as a merger of Coleg Morgannwg and Ystrad Mynach College
Gower College Swansea	Gorseinon, Swansea	Formed in August 2010 as a merger of Gorseinon College and Swansea College
Merthyr Tydfil College	Merthyr Tydfil	Constituent of the University of South Wales
NPTC Group	Brecon, Llandrindod Wells, Llansamlet, Neath, Newtown, Pontardawe, Port Talbot,	Formed in August 2013 as a merger of Neath Port Talbot College and Coleg Powys
Pembrokeshire College	Haverfordwest, Milford Haven	
St David's Catholic College	Cardiff	Sixth form college
Swansea College	Swansea	Formerly Swansea Sixth form college

== See also ==
- Education in Wales
- List of further education colleges in England
- List of further education colleges in Scotland
- List of further education colleges in Northern Ireland
- List of universities in Wales
