= Wrexham and East Denbighshire War Memorial Hospital =

Former hospital, now college, in Wrexham, Wales

Wrexham & East Denbighshire Memorial Hospital
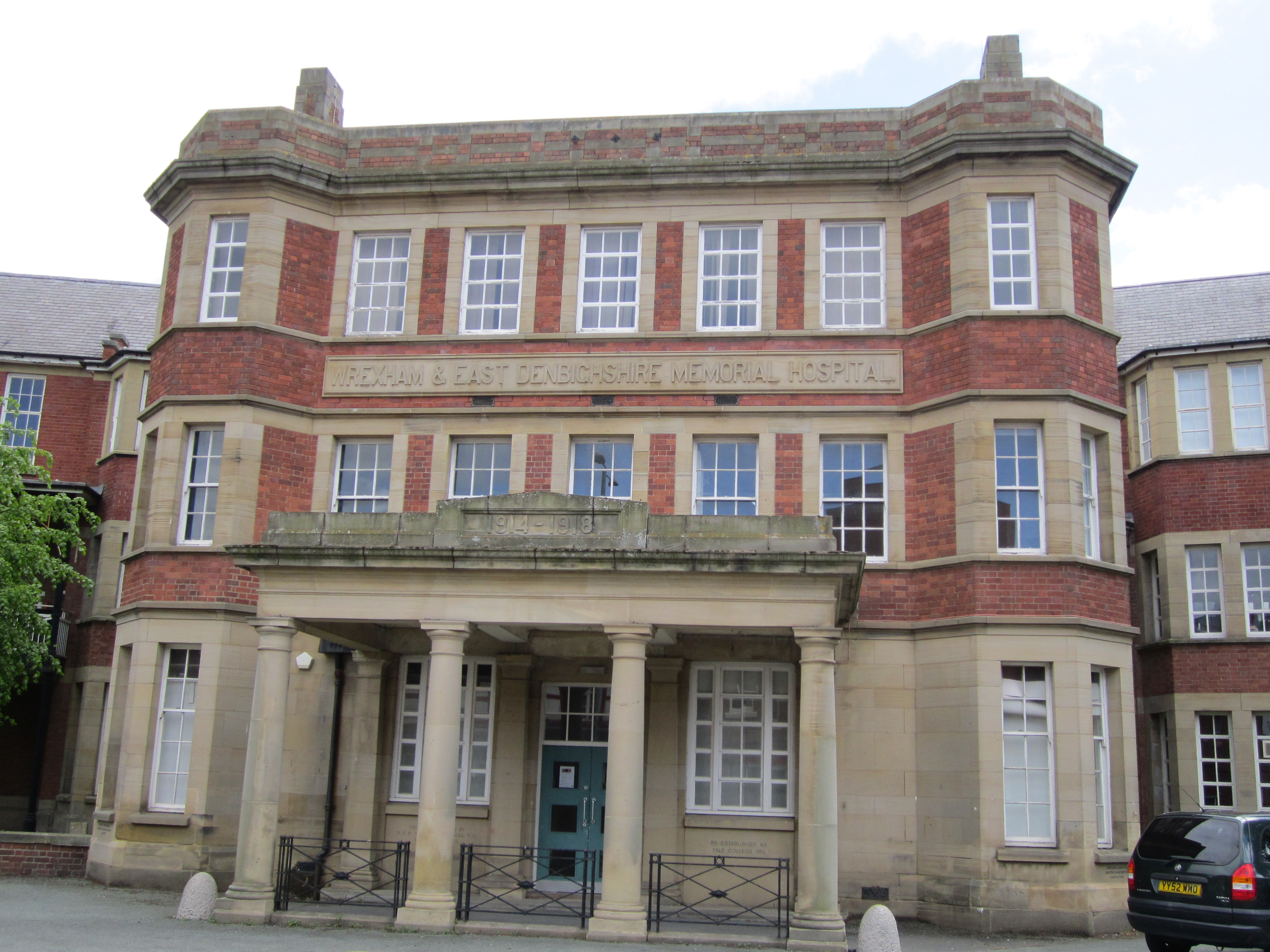
- Building's entrance on Rhosddu Road
- Interactive map of the Wrexham & East Denbighshire Memorial Hospital area

General information
- Type: Hospital (1926–1986); Further education building of Coleg Cambria Yale (1996–)
- Location: Rhosddu Road, Wrexham, Denbighshire, Wales
- Coordinates: 53.0497°N 2.9947°W
- Construction started: 2 November 1923
- Opened: 9 June 1926
- Renovated: 1996 (into a college building)
- Closed: 1986 (as a hospital)
- Owner: Yale College, Wrexham (1996–2013); Coleg Cambria (2013–)

The Wrexham and East Denbighshire War Memorial Hospital is a former hospital in Wrexham (then in historic Denbighshire), North Wales.

Its construction was partly fundraised by locals, and it was used as a war memorial to World War I. It opened in 1926, alongside an adjoining hospital, the William & John Jones Hospital (Roseneath Auxiliary Hospital), which later became part of the War Memorial Hospital.

The entire hospital facility closed in 1986, with its services moved to Wrexham Maelor Hospital. The building was later renovated and converted into an educational building as part of Coleg Cambria's Yale campus.

== History ==
In 1916, a committee decided that a new hospital was needed in Wrexham to replace the existing Wrexham Infirmary, based on Regent Street. It was decided in 1918, that the hospital would also be the best way to commemorate those lost in World War I.

The War Memorial committee had united with the William & John Jones Hospital Trust, in building the new hospital, following the decision of the trustees to work with the committee. The trust was established as part of the 1912 will of John Jones, brewer of the local Island Green Brewery, aiming to construct a new hospital in Wrexham. The will bequeathed £50,000 (equivalent to £6,252,896 in 2023), as well as a building known as Roseneath and its lands, to the building of a new hospital. The trust themselves contributed an additional £35,000 (equivalent to £4,377,027 in 2023) to the hospital's construction. Roseneath house was decided to be used as part of the new hospital, while its lands would be used to construct two buildings, the main War Memorial Hospital, which fronted Rhosddu Road, and the William & John Jones Hospital, which was located to its rear.

Between 1918 and 1927, local people in Wrexham raised money to build the Memorial Hospital. The fundraised amount later accounted for £26,000 (equivalent to £1,906,157 in 2023), roughly a quarter of the total building cost. The hospital's children's ward was paid by an annual pantomime produced by the Walter Roberts Pantomime Company.

The building's foundation stone was laid on 2 November 1923, by Edward, Prince of Wales. The stone is located outside the old main entrance of the hospital.

On 9 June 1926, the hospital opened, replacing the Regent Street-based Wrexham Infirmary. It was opened by Prince Henry, Duke of Gloucester, with Lloyd Tyrell-Kenyon, 4th Baron Kenyon, Lord Lieutenant of Denbighshire in attendance. The hospital opened in-conjunction with the neighbouring William & John Jones Hospital.

Over the next six decades since opening, a new nurses' home was opened, a chapel, a community dental centre, and additional wards to the hospital, as well as other additional facilities.

When the main site of the Maelor General Hospital, later the Wrexham Maelor Hospital, opened in 1934, the War Memorial Hospital worked alongside the hospital to serve patients in Wrexham and the surrounding areas of North Wales. Although the War Memorial Hospital's importance was diminished. When the National Health Service was established the War Memorial Hospital was grouped with the other Wrexham hospitals as the "Maelor General Hospital". The split of care between the hospitals were said to have led an "inefficient delivery of care", for example, the emergency department (casualty) was initially based at the War Memorial Hospital, while Intensive care was at Maelor. Acute and other services at the War Memorial Hospital were moved to Maelor in 1986, with the War Memorial Hospital closing in the same year. Some of the wards in the Maelor Hospital adopted the names of wards from the War Memorial Hospital, such as "Evington", "Pantomime" and "Overton".

When it closed in 1986, it was planned to be demolished for a supermarket. However, the plans were scrapped following "strong local opposition". in a "noisy campaign" against demolition as proposed by the local health board, Wrexham Borough Council and Clwyd County Council. In 1996, the building was bought by Wrexham's Yale College, and renovated to become part of its campus in 1998, now part of Coleg Cambria.

== Description ==
The hospital is located in the grounds of what was once "Grove Park", with buildings such as Grove House and Roseneath dating before the hospital's construction.

The hospital was created as a war memorial to the men killed in World War I, and served as Wrexham's main hospital for a time. It was designed by W J Walford, and built by J Gerrard & Sons Ltd. The building contained open balconies to treat those with tuberculosis by exposing their lungs to the open air.

The William and John Jones Hospital, also known as the Roseneath Auxiliary Hospital, was attached to the War Memorial Hospital, specifically its outpatient department located on Grove Park Road, and was focused on caring for wounded soldiers and later the sick elderly. Although the hospital later became part of the War Memorial Hospital. There was a dispute concerning what the hospital's name should be on the building as it could be argued that collectively it was technically two hospitals, the "Wrexham & East Denbighshire War Memorial Hospital" and "William and John Jones Memorial Hospital" at the adjoining Roseneath. "East Denbighshire" was included in the name to indicate that the hospital was a memorial for the county's dead, as Wrexham had its own memorial at St Giles' Church.

There was a chapel adjacent to the hospital. The War Memorial Hospital had a wartime mortuary at Wrexham Cemetery.
