= Deeside Stadium =

Multi-sport stadium in Deeside, Wales

- Stadiwm Glannau Dyfrdwy (Welsh)
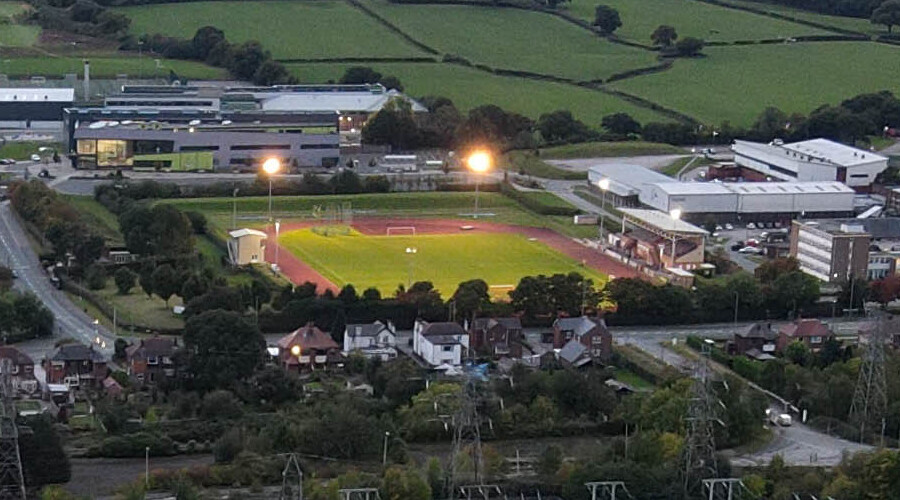
- Aerial image of the stadium from the north, with Coleg Cambria Deeside adjoining its western and southern sides.
- Interactive map of Deeside Stadium
- Location: Kelsterton Road, Connah's Quay, Deeside, CH5 4BR
- Coordinates: 53.2253°N 3.077°W
- Owner: Flintshire County Council
- Operator: Deeside College (now Coleg Cambria)
- Capacity: 420 seats
- Surface: Grass

Construction
- Opened: 1998

Tenants
- Deeside Athletic Club; Deestriders Running Club; Connah's Quay Nomads Women

Deeside Stadium (Welsh: Stadiwm Glannau Dyfrdwy) is a multi-sport stadium located in Connah's Quay, Deeside. It was the home stadium to Cymru Premier side Connah's Quay Nomads until the 2023–24 season. It is currently the home of the Deeside Athletics Club and Connah's Quay Nomads Women.

== History ==
The stadium was opened in 1998 and became home to Connah's Quay who moved from their previous venue, the Halfway Ground.

In 2006, the Nomads spent time playing at Flint Town's Cae-Y-Castell ground as the pitch at Deeside underwent renovations. Shortly afterwards, they began planning to move into a new purpose built ground, although these plans never came to fruition.

On 2 March 2023 it was announced that from the 2023–24 season, they will once again play their home games in Flint due to behind the scenes tenancy problems with the owners of the Deeside Stadium. On 11 November 2025, the team announced plans to build a new 4000 seater stadium for themselves, Shotton Steel RFC, and potential International matches in both Rugby and Football. Despite the dispute, the Connah's Quay Nomads Women's team still play their fixtures at Deeside.

== Layout ==
The stadium features one raised stand containing 500 seats. Lying next to it is a small disabled shelter. Opposite the stand is a two-storey media centre and TV gantry.

== Attendances ==
Connah's Quay's record attendance at the Deeside Stadium is 1,068 for the Scottish Challenge Cup Semi Final game against Edinburgh City F.C. on 16 February 2019.
