= Wrexham University =

University in north-east Wales

- Prifysgol Wrecsam
- Coat of arms Flag
- Former names: Wrexham School of Science and Art (1887); Denbighshire Technical Institute (1927); Denbighshire Technical College (1939); North East Wales Institute of Higher Education (1975–2008); Glyndŵr University (2008–2016); Wrexham Glyndŵr University (2016–2023)
- Motto: Welsh: Hyder trwy Addysg
- Motto in English: Confidence through Education
- Type: Public
- Established: 1887; 139 years ago (Wrexham School of Science and Art); 2008; 18 years ago as a university (Glyndŵr University)
- Endowment: £0.2 million (2022)
- Budget: £44.8 million (2021–22)
- Chancellor: Colin Jackson
- Vice-Chancellor: Joe Yates
- Students: 8,560 (2024/25)
- Undergraduates: 4,955 (2024/25)
- Postgraduates: 3,605 (2024/25)
- Location: Wrexham, Wales; 53.054°N 3.006°W
- Campus: Urban
- Colours: Scarlet red and Gold (while Glyndŵr)
- Website: wrexham.ac.uk

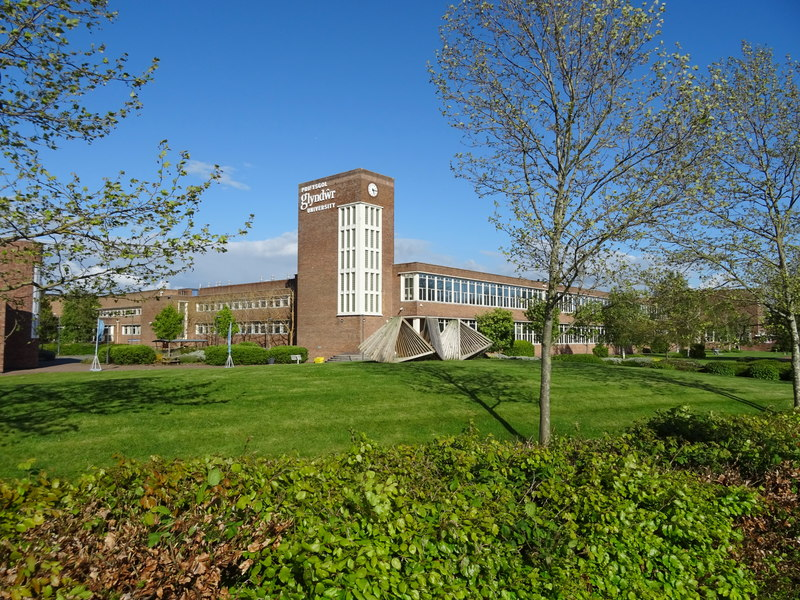
Main Wrexham building

Wrexham University (Welsh: Prifysgol Wrecsam; Welsh pronunciation: [priːvˈəsɡɔl ˈrɛksam]) is a public university in the north-east of Wales, with campuses in Wrexham, Northop and St Asaph. It offers both undergraduate and postgraduate degrees, as well as professional courses. The university had 6,045 students in 2024/25.

The earliest predecessor of the university was the Wrexham School of Science and Art (WSSA), established in 1887, which after several mergers became the North East Wales Institute of Higher Education (NEWI) in 1975. The institute became a full member of the University of Wales in 2004. In 2008 it was granted full university status and renamed Glyndŵr University (Prifysgol Glyndŵr) after Owain Glyndŵr, a fifteenth-century Welsh leader who was born near Wrexham and suggested the establishment of universities in Wales. It was changed to Wrexham Glyndŵr University in 2016, until the university adopted its current name in late 2023.

The university's School of Creative Arts operates the Wall Recording Studio on its Plas Coch campus, the former home of Calon FM community radio station.

== History ==
The university's origins date back to the opening of Wrexham School of Science and Art (WSSA) in 1887. At this time John Viriamu Jones called for a University of Wales. The WSSA began offering University of London-validated degrees in science in 1924. The original name of Wrexham School of Science and Art was changed several times. In 1927, it became Denbighshire Technical Institute, becoming Denbighshire Technical College in 1939 and North East Wales Institute of Higher Education in 1975 by the merger of Denbighshire Technical College, Cartrefle Teacher Training College and Kelsterton College of Connah's Quay, Deeside. Initially, its degrees were validated by the University of Salford. Some famous alumni include Andrew Gwynne (when it was North East Wales Institute of Higher Education), Gavin Roberts, and Brian Percival (as North Wales School of Art and Design).

In 1993, NEWI became an associate member of the University of Wales and all further education courses in Wrexham were moved to Yale College, Wrexham (now part of Coleg Cambria). In 2004, NEWI became a full member of the University of Wales, with "University of Wales, Wrexham" touted as a potential future name, and in 2006 became accredited by the University of Wales and exercised devolved powers to validate and deliver its own degrees. The university was officially renamed "Glyndŵr University" in July 2008 after being granted degree awarding powers. The university was visited by the Queen in 2003 and by Birgitte, Duchess of Gloucester in 2005.

In June 2014, the Home Office suspended the University's authorisation to sponsor international students.

On 24 November 2014 Glyndŵr University has had its right to sponsor international students reinstated by the Home Office.

In 2016, the university underwent a minor name change and is now called "Wrexham Glyndŵr University" in English, and "Prifysgol Glyndŵr Wrecsam" in Welsh.

Between 2008 and 2019, the main Wrexham campus of the University hosted Wales Comic Con, reduced to one-day events from 2022 following a brief absence.

In August 2022, the university announced it was considering re-naming itself to "Wrexham University" (Welsh: Prifysgol Wrecsam) dropping "Glyndŵr" from its name. On 27 April 2023, the university confirmed its plans to rename to "Wrexham University", following consultations with staff, students and other organisations, and approval by the Privy Council. The Privy Council legally changed the name of the university on 9 February 2023. The university stated the increased attention of Wrexham due to Wrexham A.F.C., Welcome to Wrexham and Wrexham's awarded city status, as reasons for the move. The university also made plans to "continue celebrat[ing] [Glyndŵr's] legacy". The name change became official in September 2023, and the university maintains links with the Owain Glyndŵr Society to offer one of its top graduate awards.

In March 2026, it was awarded the authority to award its own research degrees. Prior to this, its research degrees were awarded on behalf of the University of Chester.

== Campuses ==
The university has various sites in Wrexham and north east Wales. From 2011 to 2018 it ran a campus in London.

=== Wrexham ===
==== Plas Coch ====
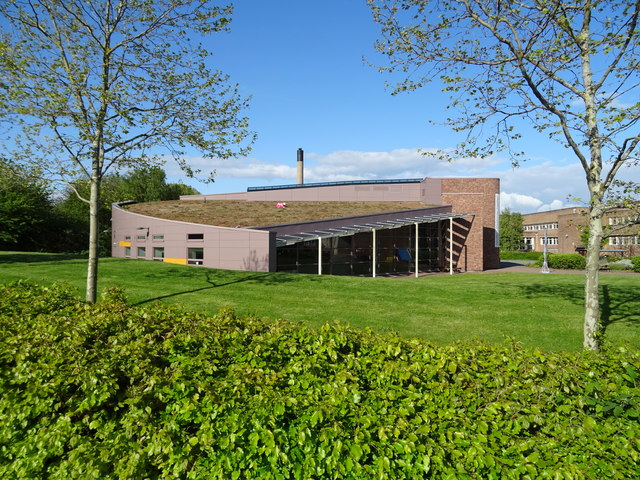
The Centre for the Creative Industries, Wrexham

The university has two sites in Wrexham. The main site at Plas Coch covers 93 acres (380,000 m^{2}), and was inherited from the former Cartrefle TTC which moved there in 1953. It houses over 70 seminar suites, conference suites, lecture theatres, workshops and laboratories, complemented with a library (the Edward Llwyd Centre) and learning resource facilities, as well as a sports centre, a Centre for the Creative Industries, the Centre for the Child, Family and Society, the Glyndŵr University Racecourse Stadium, a human performance lab, the Terry Hands studio, the Catrin Finch Centre, William Aston Hall, the Oriel Sycharth Gallery and the Welsh international hockey team.

The educational charity North Wales Science, owned by the university, operated a science discovery centre on the Plas Coch campus. The centre was open to schools and the general public, and in a partnership with Techniquest in Cardiff, was branded as 'Techniquest@NEWI' and later 'Techniquest Glyndŵr', from 2003 to 2020. In 2019, the charity decided to relocate to a site in Wrexham city centre, with their Henblas Street site opening on 3 October 2020, rebranding as 'Xplore! Science Discovery Centre'.

==== Regent Street ====
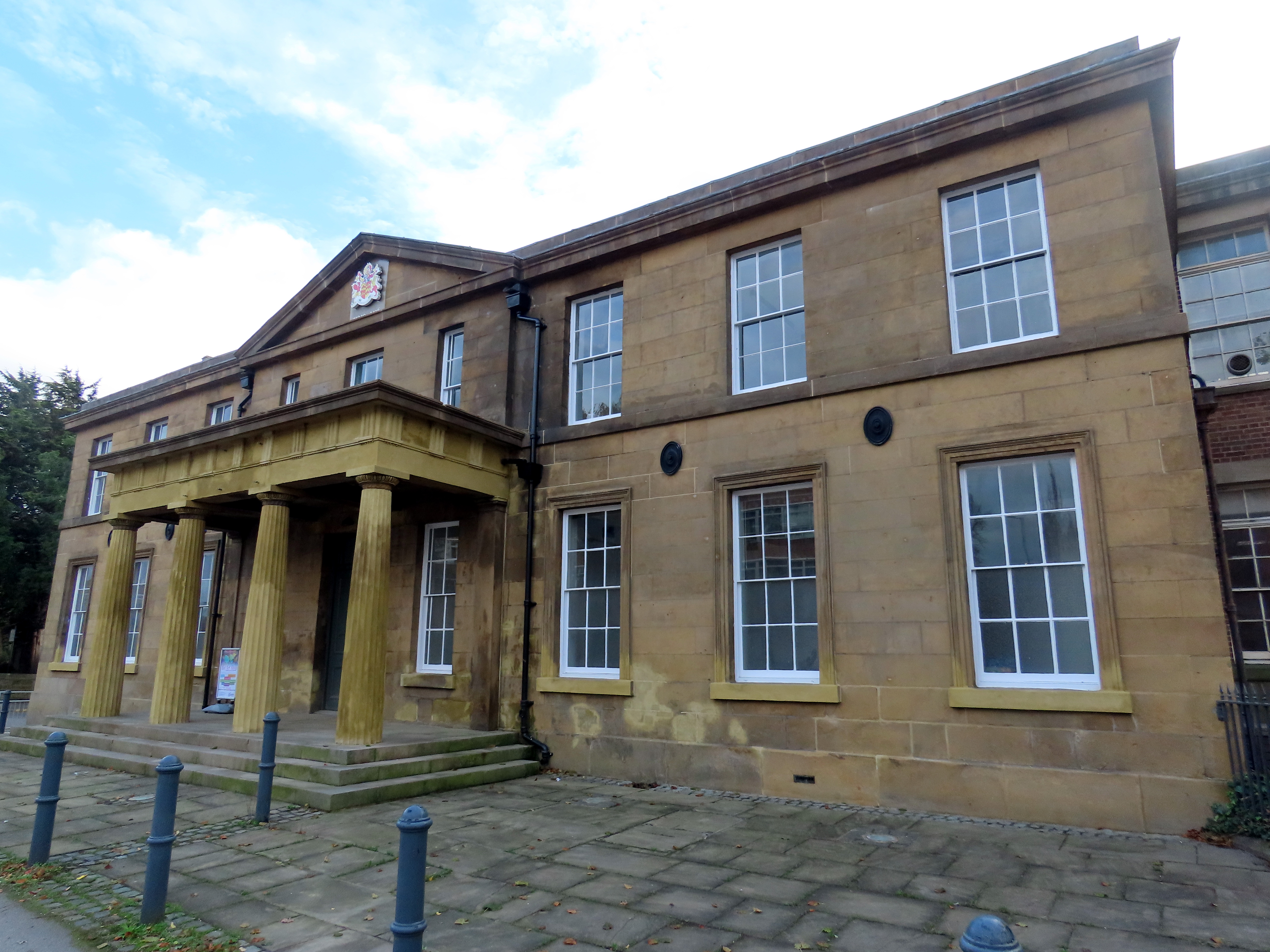
Regent Street site in Wrexham

The other Wrexham site on Regent Street, is near to Wrexham city centre and is home to its North Wales School of Art and Design (NWSAD). It formerly housed the Denbighshire Technical College, who moved to the site in 1927 (under their previous name of Denbighshire Technical Institute). In 2011, the university acquired the Racecourse Ground, the home of Wrexham FC, renaming it the Glyndŵr University Racecourse Stadium. The university sold the stadium back to the club on 29 June 2022.

The university has its own music recording facilities, notably The Wall Recording Studio.

=== Northop ===
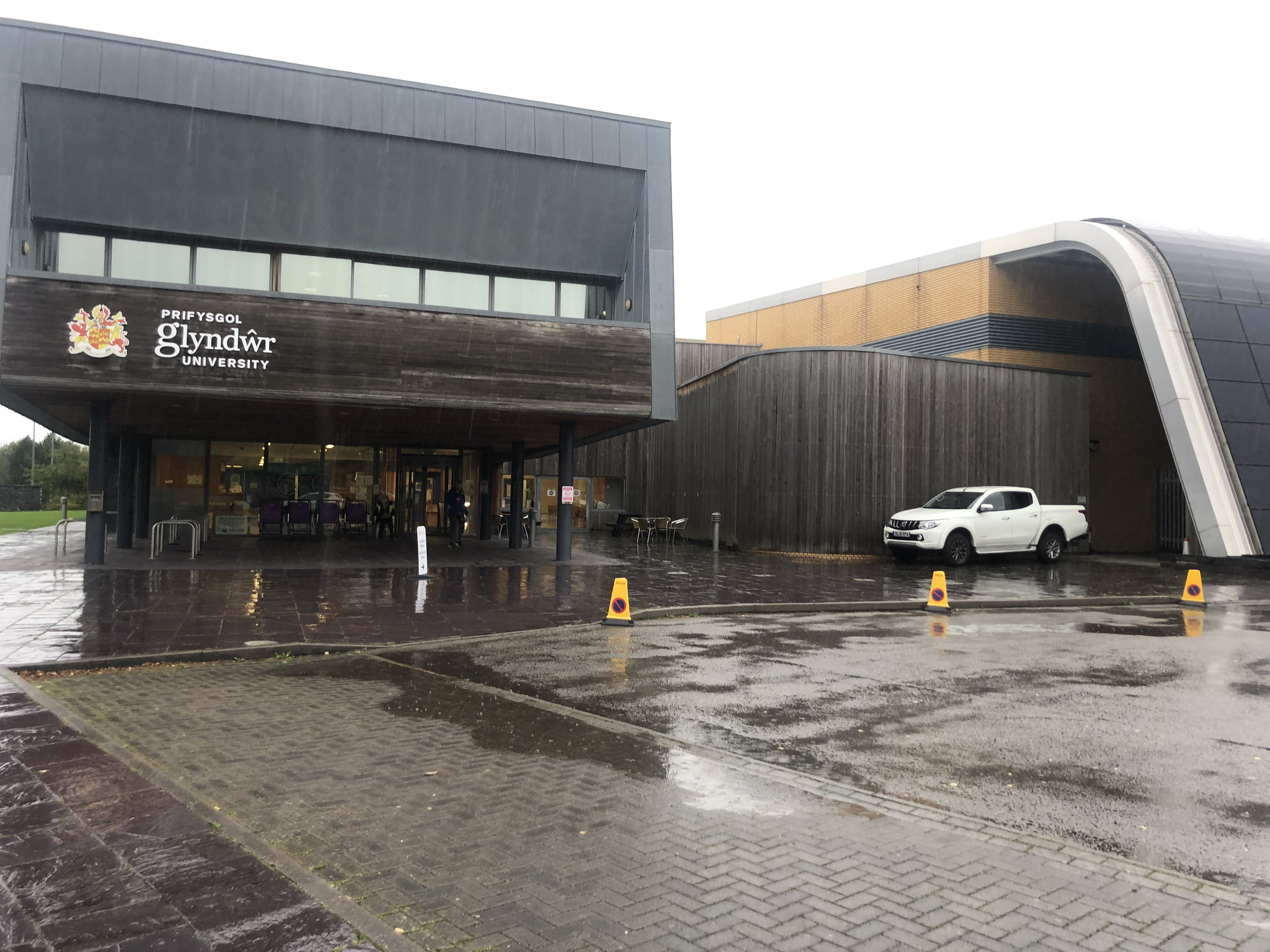
University building in St Asaph Business Park

The university shares the former Welsh College of Horticulture in Northop, Flintshire, with Coleg Cambria. It specialises in the teaching of animal behaviour, equine science, welfare and conservation, and veterinary nursing, with a clinical suite for the latter based at the campus. Northop hosts around a hundred students of the university annually.

=== St Asaph ===
The university has a campus in St Asaph Business Park. It contains a research centre specialising in opto-electronics technology. It also houses other science laboratories and other facilities for research, conferences and meetings.

== Academic profile ==
Rankings
National rankings
- Complete (2027): 129
- Guardian (2026): 111
- Times / Sunday Times (2026): 122

The university runs 150 programmes, offering foundation, HND/Cs, honours and master's degrees and doctorates over a broad variety of qualifications. In addition to professional courses such as nursing and social work, the university offers a range of postgraduate and undergraduate qualifications in Art & Design, Engineering, Science, Humanities, Health and Social Care, Criminology and Criminal Justice, Sports Sciences, Computing and Communication Technology, Music technology and Business. Although all courses are offered in English there are options to study or to be assessed in Welsh. A foundation degree in professional Welsh is also available.

The North Wales School of Art and Design at Wrexham Glyndŵr University was named as the best place to study Art in Wales in the Guardian University League Tables 2017 and also ranked 12th out of all UK universities.

Wrexham Glyndwr University is also number one in North Wales for getting its students jobs after graduation. The institution achieved an employability figure of 92.1% and is also above the sector average for graduate level employment, according to the latest Destination of Leavers Survey (DLHE).

=== International links ===
The University has international partnerships across Europe, Africa and Asia and is a member of the Fair Trade Coalition.

== Administration ==
The first principal of the then North East Wales Institute was Glyn O. Phillips. He retired in 1991 and was replaced by John O. Williams. Following the retirement of Williams in 2000, NEWI appointed Michael Scott, a former student of the University of Wales, Lampeter in 2001. He was succeeded by Graham Upton in January 2015 who served as interim vice-chancellor until 31 March 2016. Maria Hinfelaar, who was previously the President of the Limerick Institute of Technology, replaced Upton from April 2016. In August 2024, Joe Yates replaced Hinfelaar as vice-chancellor.

== Companies ==
Wrexham University has two subsidiaries, Glyndŵr Innovations Ltd (established in 2015) and the North Wales Science charity, which operate the Xplore! science centre (formerly known as Techniquest Glyndŵr).

Collaborative partners include: Coleg Cambria (Yale College & Deeside College), Coleg Menai, Coleg Llandrillo Cymru, Coleg Powys, Londontec City Campus, Sri Lanka

== Student life ==
Wrexham University's students come from all over the United Kingdom and the European Union. WU is also popular with mature students. Around 54% of Wrexham University students are over twenty-one with 17% over the age of forty.

=== Accommodation ===
There are three main halls of residence in Wrexham, namely the Student village, Wrexham Village and Snowdon Hall as well as Corbishley Hall at Northop. The main student village is separated into houses and the houses into flats. Snowdon Hall, Bath Road and Clwyd House are near Wrexham city. The student village and Snowdon Hall are en suite and the rest are shared facilities. All of Wrexham Glyndwr University's accommodation is self-catering. Snowdon Hall is separated into five separate blocks of lockable flats and is currently leased from and run by the Opal Group.

=== Sports, clubs and traditions ===
Wrexham University sport teams compete in British Universities & Colleges Sport (BUCS). In the 2017–18 academic year, Wrexham University have 9 teams competing in the BUCS structure. Team sports played at the university are men's rugby union, women's netball, men's basketball, men's hockey, men's and women's football, men's and women's futsal.

Wrexham University Sports Centre houses a 1000 m^{2} hall. The hall is overlooked by an open balcony and an enclosed spectator area on the first floor. The facility complies with national competition standards for badminton, netball, basketball, volleyball, futsal and handball. There is also provision for table tennis and matting for martial arts.

Wrexham University has a radio studio, sound recording studio, engineering laboratories, art gallery, IT facilities, theatre studios, motor racing team, a dedicated scene of crime lab and notably the unusual asset of a Chinese medicine clinic.

The Plas Coch site hosts an active student union as well as the student union bar, now housed in the football stadium's Centenary Club. Wrexham University has its own car racing team which is run by the engineering school's Car Performance degree course students.

Also in the Plas Coch area of Wrexham are Wrexham A.F.C., North Wales Crusaders and the North Wales Regional Hockey Stadium. In August 2011, the university agreed a deal to buy Wrexham FC's Racecourse Ground.

In October 2014, former Welsh international footballer Robbie Savage was given an honorary fellowship at the university for services to sport.

== Notable alumni ==
- Vitaliy Baranov (figure skater), former competitive ice dancer
- Chris Hughes (football manager), Welsh football manager and former player
- Steven Forshaw, British powerlifter who won British, European and World Championship titles in 2025
- Robbie Savage, former Welsh international footballer
- Jack Sargeant, politician

== See also ==
- Armorial of UK universities
- Education in Wales
- List of universities in Wales
- List of UK universities
