= Coleg Cambria Llysfasi =

Land-based college campus near Ruthin, Wales

Coleg Cambria Llysfasi Campus
- Campws Coleg Cambria Llysfasi (Welsh)
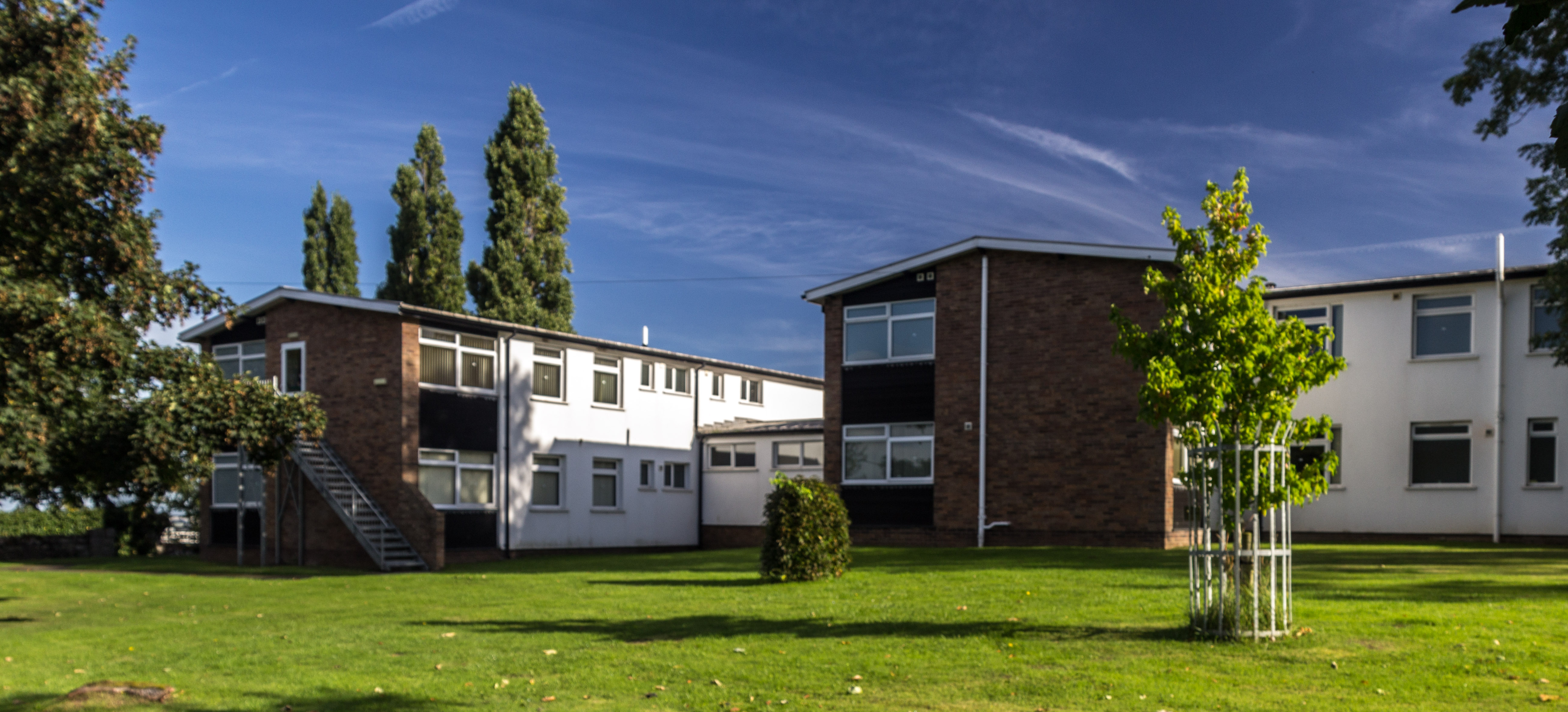
- Llysfasi College
- Other names: Llysfasi College; Coleg Llysfasi (Welsh)
- Former names: Llysfasi Manor Farm School; Valley Farm; Llysfasi College of Agriculture
- Part of: Coleg Cambria (since 2013)
- Type: Further education college campus Independent college (1911–2013)
- Active: 1911–2013 (as a separate college); 2013– (as a campus)
- Location: Ruthin Road, Llysfasi, Ruthin, Denbighshire, LL15 2LB, Wales, United Kingdom; 53.062°N 3.274°W
- Campus: Component, rural
- Website: Coleg Cambria Llysfasi

Coleg Cambria Llysfasi, previously Coleg Llysfasi (Welsh for 'Llysfasi College'), is a campus of Coleg Cambria, a further education college, located in Pentrecelyn, near Ruthin, in Denbighshire, North Wales.

An agricultural college was first established at the site in 1911 as a Farm Institute and later as a rural college, while the site contains a manor house dating to the late 16th century. The college was first planned by Charles William Sandles when he purchased the estate from Ruthin Castle in 1909, and renamed it as Valley Farm. Although in 1911, just prior to its planned opening, it was sold to R.W. Brown due to financial difficulties. Under Brown, the site was renovated under the name Llysfasi Manor Farm School.

In 1919, Denbighshire County Council (1889–1974) purchased the site, leading to improvements culminating in the recognition of the school as a Farm Institute. The school launched its first course as such in May 1920. In the 1960s, the school renamed itself the Llysfasi College of Agriculture.

In 2010, the college was merged into Deeside College as the Deeside College Group, which also included Northop College. In 2013, the Deeside College Group, merged with Yale College, Wrexham to form Coleg Cambria. The former college grounds is now one of the five campuses of Coleg Cambria, alongside the Northop, Deeside, Yale (Grove Park Road), and Bersham Road sites. The name 'Llysfasi' is retained at the campus.

In addition to its main Llysfasi site near Pentrecelyn, Ruthin, the college had also operated Wrexham Training, a campus on Ruthin Road, in Wrexham.

== History ==
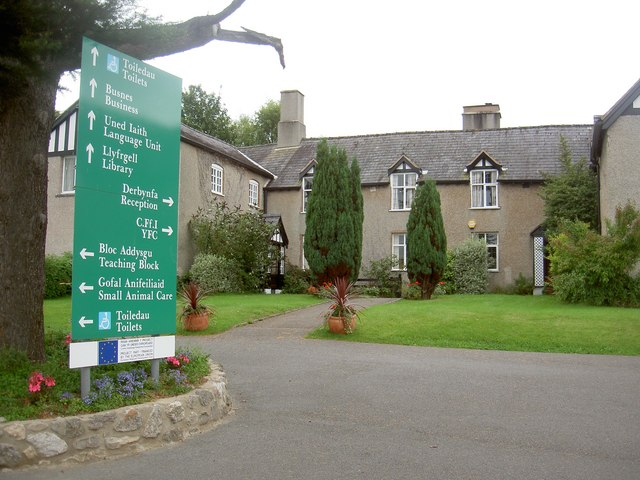
The Manor House at Llysfasi

The original name was possibly Llys Llannerch, but later changed to Llys Masi (Welsh for 'Massey's court') by one of the descendents of a late 13th century tenant who held the same name, therefore may have occurred in the late 16th century when the manor house was built. From 1633 to 1909, it was owned by the Myddleton family of Chirk, and their descendants, the Wests and lastly the Cornwallis-Wests of Ruthin Castle.

In 1909, Charles William Sandles of Cheshire bought the estate for £13,680, and made plans to establish an agricultural college on the site. The estate's name was changed to Valley Farm. However, in March 1911, a mere three months prior to the proposed opening of the farm school, it faced financial difficulties. This led to another sale of the estate to R.W. Brown, a Birkenhead cotton broker. Under Brown's ownership, the site underwent refurbishment and reverted its name to Llysfasi. Plans to establish an agricultural educational facility still went ahead, with it advertised as Llysfasi Manor Farm School.

In 1919, Denbighshire County Council (1889–1974), utilising a Ministry of Agriculture grant, purchased Llysfasi from Brown. The ministry had a scheme after World War I to develop agricultural education. The school appointed its first principal, Issac Jones in December 1919. Under council ownership the college had further structural and administrative improvements. As a result, it was recognised as a "Farm Institute", with its first course launched on 10 May 1920.

During World War II, the college suspended its classes from 1940 up until 28 October 1946. Following the war, the college added one-year courses to its offering. By the end of the 1950s, the college hosted a variety of rural courses, adding courses involving crops and animal husbandry, domestic skills, dairying, gardening, household management and accounting, poultry, machinery, and uphostery and furnishing.

In the 1960s, the college underwent change and development. In 1961, the college established a board of governors, replacing the previous Farm Committee. In 1962, a hostel block opened on the site. Over the next few years many of the old farm buildings were replaced, with the new farm buildings opening in 1965, and a teaching block also opened in 1967.

At the same time, the ministry no longer held any direct control over Farm Institutes, as well as the college altering its name to Llysfasi College of Agriculture. From the 1960s, the college developed its courses further.

=== Merger with Deeside College ===
On 1 August 2010, the college merged into Deeside College with Welsh Assembly Government approval. They formed part of the Deeside College Group, one of the largest institutions in Wales and the UK. The group had almost 22,000 annual students, more than 1,000 staff, and an annual income of almost £40 million at the time.

In 2012, Llysfasi and Northop College (both under Deeside College) announced a partnership with Coleg Glynllifon, part of Grŵp Llandrillo Menai, in the promotion of the college's land-based courses.

=== Under Coleg Cambria ===
Deeside College later merged with Yale College, Wrexham, to form Coleg Cambria in 2013. The name 'Llysfasi' was retained for the campus.

In 2018, the college announced a £20 million development that showcases renewable and new agricultural technologies, changes its farming practices, as well as replacing buildings of its Llysfasi campus, to become Britain's "first carbon neutral farm". With support coming from the North Wales Economic Ambition Board.

In April 2019, it hosted the UK Loggers competition and training day, to attract competitors for international contests. In November 2019, it held entrepreneurial workshops by Royal Association of British Dairy Farmers for the first time, collaborating with The Andersons Centre, AHDB Dairy, and the NFU.

In 2020, the college and its students resurrected 12 hectares (30 acres) of derelict woodland located near Ruthin. This is in addition to the 70 hectares (170 acres) of woodland at the Llysfasi site.

In 2021, a study of Aberystwyth University at Aberystwyth and Llysfasi, identified the use of fitness trackers for predicting sheep pregnancies.

== Campus ==
Logo of Coleg Llysfasi and Wrexham Training until 2010.

The former college had two main campuses in North Wales, the main Llysfasi site near Ruthin, and Wrexham Training campus on Ruabon Road, Felin Puleston, in Wrexham. The college focuses on Agricultural Studies, as well as providing both full and part-time courses concerning Animal care, business, care and childcare, engineering, hair, beauty and holistic therapy, information technology, modern languages and Welsh.

The college has been a centre for agricultural and land-based education for over 90 years, the main centre for the educational field in historic Denbighshire, Clwyd and modern Denbighshire. The college first specialised in agricultural education in 1911, following the breakup of the Ruthin Castle estate in September 1909. Initially a Farm Institute, Llysfasi has expanded its educational services as more of a rural college.

The farm of the college is more than 300 hectares (740 acres) in land area, and spans from steep hills, through open upland grass, to the lowlands of the Vale of Clwyd. The college's buildings are located at the foot of Nant y Garth. By 2009, the college had more than 5,000 students and 130 staff. It also offered community support and courses in outreach centres across the Vale of Clwyd, Dee Valley, and North Wales coast.

=== Llysfasi campus ===
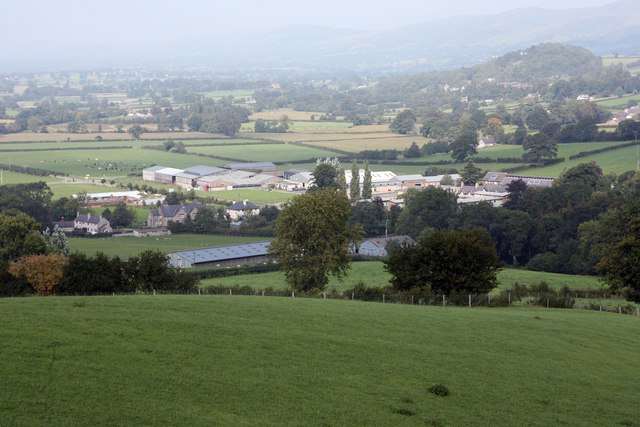
Llysfasi College, from a nearby hill, in 2006.

The Llysfasi campus is located in Pentrecelyn in the Vale of Clwyd, near Ruthin, in Denbighshire and within the Clwydian Range and Dee Valley Area of Outstanding Natural Beauty. It has an agriculture teaching centre, engineering workshops, community centre, facilities dedicated to forestry and countryside, a dairy centre, accommodation, a library, and a cafe and refectory. There are also plans to establish a sustainability hub on the site. It is one of the five campuses of the college.

In 2011, the college opened a beekeeping centre in collaboration with the South Clwyd Beekeepers' Association. The college had been running a bee-keeping course since the 1990s.

By 2013, the college's library had an archive room, containing historical photographs of the former manor and of the college's early years, as well as a various collection of memorabilia.

In late 2024, a new agriculture and education building is planned to open on the site.

=== Wrexham Training ===
Prior to the mergers, Wrexham Training was one of the main campuses of Coleg Llysfasi. It was located on Ruabon Road, Felin Puleston, in Wrexham.

Now since occupied by the Felin Puleston Outdoor Centre, run by Woodland Classroom.
