= Steven Forshaw =

British powerlifter (born 1988)

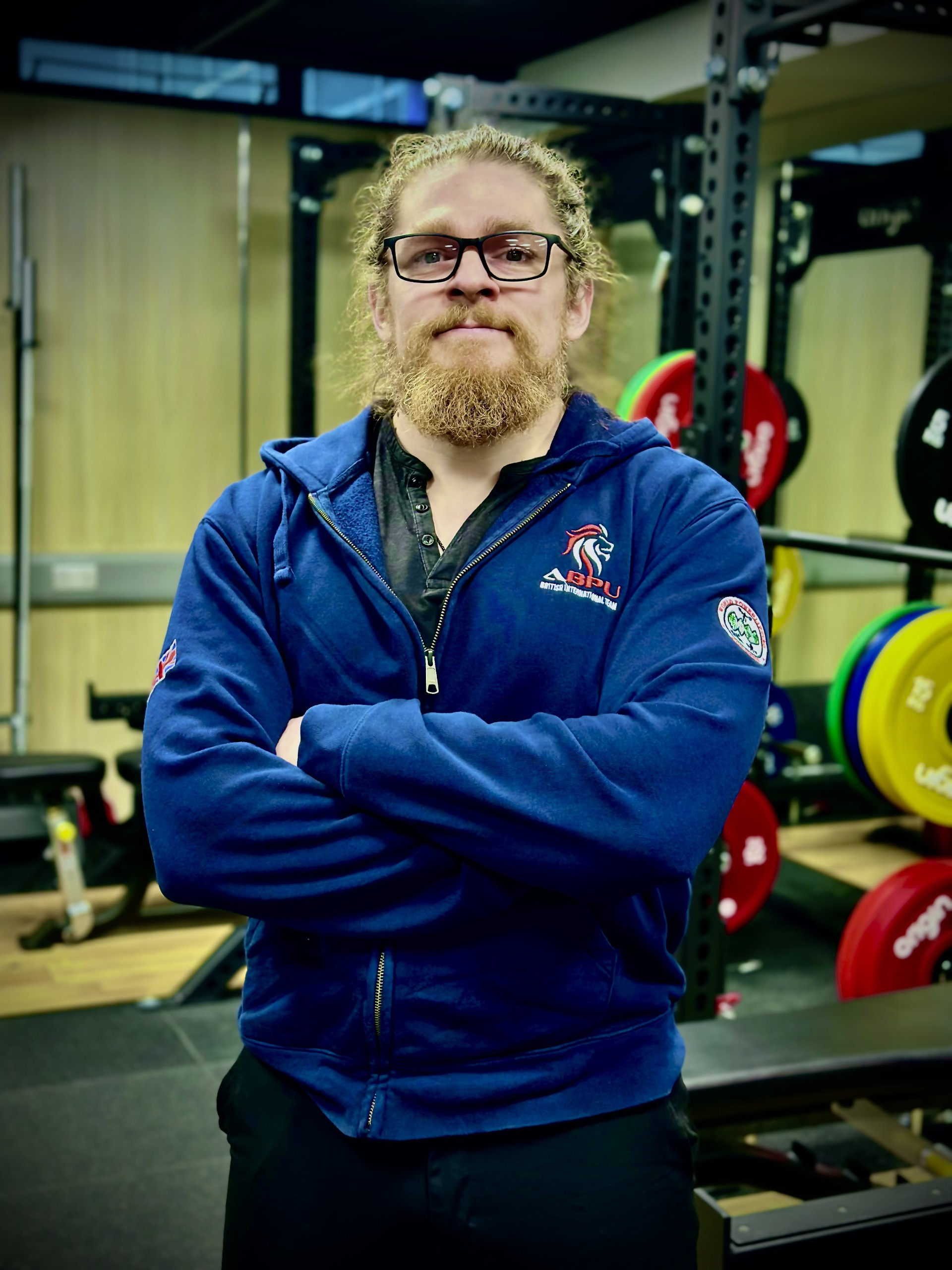
- Steven Forshaw, British powerlifter, 2025

Personal information
- Full name: Steven Forshaw
- Nationality: British
- Born: 1988 (age 37–38)
- Height: 178 cm (5 ft 10 in)
- Weight: 100 kg (220 lb)
- Website: www.instagram.com/S.Forshaw.Powerlifting

Sport
- Sport: Powerlifting
- Event(s): Full Power, Push-Pull, Bench Press, Deadlift
Medal record
Steven Forshaw
Medal record
British Championships
Gold medal – first place	2026	Deadlift Championship
Gold medal – first place	2025	Bench Press Championship
Silver medal – second place	2025	Deadlift Championship
Gold medal – first place	2025	UK Powerlifting Games
Gold medal – first place	2025	Push-Pull Nationals
European Championships
Gold medal – first place	2025	Bench Press Championship
Gold medal – first place	2025	Deadlift Championship
World Championships
Gold medal – first place	2025	Bench Press Championship
Gold medal – first place	2025	Deadlift Championship

Steven Forshaw (born 1988) is a British competitive powerlifter and chartered accountant. He is primarily known for his achievements in the World Powerlifting Congress (WPC), where he secured multiple World, European and British championship titles. Forshaw completed a "Triple Crown" of victories in 2025 across the world, European and national levels across multiple disciplines in the sport.

His World Championship titles in 2025 came nine years after suffering a knee injury requiring surgical reconstruction.

== Professional career and education ==
Forshaw attended the University of Bath, where he graduated with a Bachelor of Science (BSc) in Mathematical Sciences in 2010. He is currently reading for a Master of Science (MSc) in Sport Performance Science at Wrexham University, where his research focuses on the practical application of biomechanics and physiology to elite powerlifting performance. Forshaw intends to pursue further education in the future, aspiring to complete his PhD, having also qualified as a Personal Trainer and Strength Coach.

He is a Fellow of the ICAEW, having qualified as a chartered accountant in 2014 and achieving Fellowship in 2024. His corporate career has involved financial control, strategic oversight, and financial analysis. He has spoken publicly regarding the parallels between the analytical discipline required in corporate finance and the structured, data-driven nature of high-performance powerlifting training.

Forshaw's corporate career has spanned financial services and logistics industries, most recently operating as a financial consultant.

== Injury and recovery ==
In 2016, Forshaw suffered a significant knee injury, necessitating a full surgical reconstruction including the meniscus, Medial Collateral Ligament (MCL) and Anterior Cruciate Ligament (ACL). He utilised his mathematical background to structure his rehabilitation as a 'long-term strategic plan', initially returning to weight training to regain basic mobility. This period of recovery eventually led to a transition into competitive powerlifting, with Forshaw noting that his post-rehabilitation strength levels ultimately exceeded his pre-injury capacity.

== Powerlifting career ==
Forshaw began competing in powerlifting in 2022 in the 93 kg weight class, following a period of extensive rehabilitation from a previous career-threatening injury. He has since competed nationally and internationally, under the International Powerlifting Federation (IPF), World Raw Powerlifting Federation (WRPF), Amateur British Powerlifting Union (ABPU) and Amateur World Powerlifting Congress (AWPC) as a drug-tested (AKA natural) athlete, in the 93 kg, 100 kg and 110 kg weight classes.

He achieved recognition for securing the "Triple Crown" (British, European and World Championship Gold Medals) in 2025. During 2025, he set a new British Record for the multi-ply suited deadlift at 250 kg at an ABPU sanctioned meet.

In March 2026, Forshaw competed at the ABPU British Championships, held at the National Exhibition Centre (NEC) in Birmingham during the Arnold Sports Festival. Competing in the 110 kg category, he set a new age-group world record in the deadlift by successfully lifting 290 kg. In addition to his record-breaking performance, he placed fourth in the raw bench press division.

== Competitive record ==
Winning percentage: 60.9%

Podium percentage: 87.0%

Forshaw initially competed as a 93 kg athlete within the IPF, before moving up to the 100 kg and 110 kg weight classes within the ABPU, WRPF and AWPC. To date, he has secured titles and podium finishes under all four of these federations.

Place	1st	2nd	3rd	4th	5th	6th	7th	8th	9th	10th	Total
All competitions	14	5	1	2	0	1	0	0	0	0	23

== Personal records ==
All lifts are in competition and verified by the relevant federations.

Lift	Weight (kg)	Category
Squat	215.0	Raw
Squat	220.0	Wraps
Bench press	150.0	Raw
Bench press	200.0	Equipped
Deadlift	272.5	Raw
Deadlift	290.0	Equipped
Total	620.0	Raw

== Personal life ==
Outside of competitive powerlifting, Forshaw’s early athletic interests included football, boxing and distance running; he is a multiple-time finisher of the Bath Half Marathon.
