= Coleg Cambria Deeside =

College campus in Flintshire, Wales

Coleg Cambria Deeside Campus
- Campws Coleg Cambria; Glannau Dyfrdwy (Welsh)
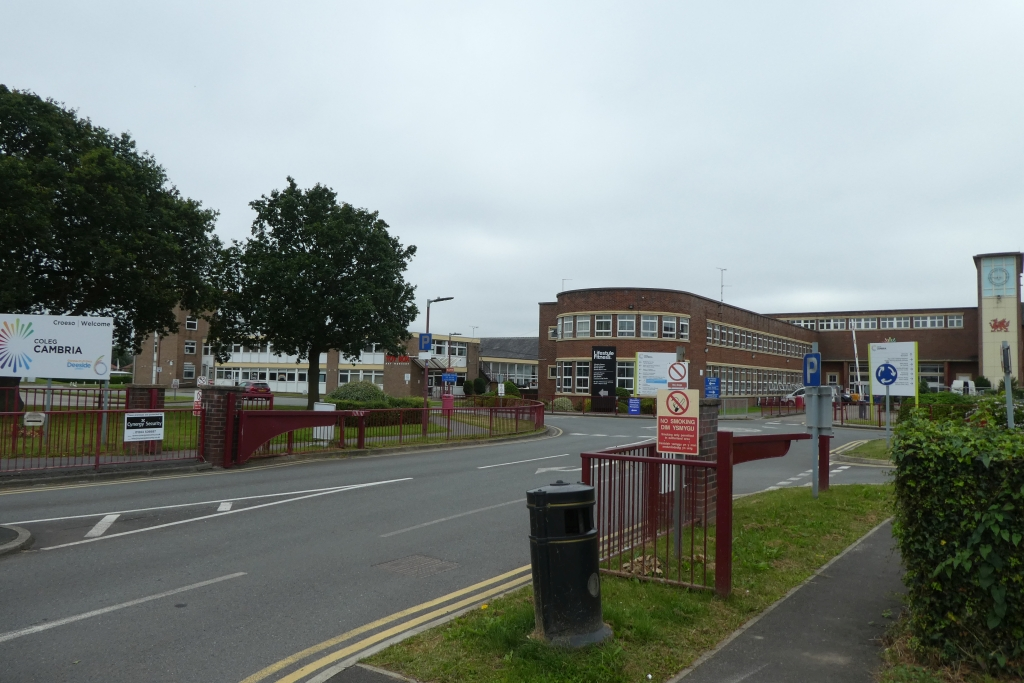
- Road towards the main entrance.
- Former names: Flintshire Technical College; Flintshire College of Technology; Kelsterton College; Deeside College; Coleg Glannau Dyfrdwy (Welsh)
- Part of: Coleg Cambria (since 2013)
- Type: Further education college campus
- Active: 1952–2013 (as a separate college); 2013– (as part of Coleg Cambria)
- Location: Kelsterton Road, Kelsterton, Connah's Quay, Deeside, Flintshire, Wales, United Kingdom; 53.226°N 3.078°W
- Campus: Component, urban
- Website: www.cambria.ac.uk/college-sites/deeside/

Coleg Cambria Deeside (Welsh: Coleg Cambria Glannau Dyfrdwy) is a campus of Coleg Cambria, a further education college, encompassing the grounds of the former Deeside College (Coleg Glannau Dyfrdwy), in Connah's Quay, Flintshire, North Wales.

A technical school in Flintshire was first proposed and approved in 1944, with the college opening as the Flintshire Technical College in 1952. In the 1950s, the college was challenged by the Denbighshire Technical College in Wrexham, as further education was proposed to be centralised there. In 1966, it was renamed the Flintshire College of Technology, in hopes to become a centre of advanced technology. Following the formation of the county of Clwyd in 1974, merging Denbighshire and Flintshire, the college was renamed Kelsterton College, and became part of the North East Wales Institute (NEWI), combining it and the three other Wrexham colleges. However in the 1990s, when Clwyd was split, the college became independent from NEWI and known as Deeside College. The college then developed its campus, including the opening of the Deeside College Sports Stadium, developed its reputation and finances, as well as local corporate partnerships.

Deeside College merged with the Welsh College of Horticulture, in Northop, Flintshire, in 2009, forming the Deeside College Group. In the same year, it also merged with Coleg Llysfasi, in Ruthin, Denbighshire, forming one of Wales' largest institutions with almost 22,000 annual students and 1000 staff.

In 2013, the college merged with Yale College, Wrexham to form Coleg Cambria. The former Deeside College grounds is now one of the five campuses of Coleg Cambria, alongside the Northop, Llysfasi, Yale (Grove Park Road), and Bersham Road sites. The name 'Deeside' is retained at the campus.

== History ==
The college is located in Kelsterton, Connah's Quay. Its location close to the England–Wales border, gave the college a catchment area of not just Flintshire, but also the Wirral and the Cheshire–south Lancashire urban conurbations.

In 1944, during the increasing industrialisation of Flintshire, the Advisory Council for Technical Education (North Wales) was set up. In the same year, approval was granted for the building of a technical college in the county.

=== Flintshire Technical College/College of Technology ===
It first opened in 1952 as the Flintshire Technology College, or Flintshire Technical College, while construction of the main building began four years before, in 1948. Although the college was publicly opened in 1956, by Miles Thomas, chairman of BOAC, highlighting the links between the college and the aviation industry. By 1957, the technical college had 3,000 students, and in 1959, the college had the capacity for 8,000 students, comprising 1,000 full-time and 7,000 part-time students. However, it was reported that there were 816 students at the time, alongside 27 staff. The excess capacity was preparation for the mid-20th century baby boom and for children born of that period reaching 16.

Issues arose from the 1950s, over competition with the nearby Denbighshire Technical College, in Wrexham, as they were only 17 miles (27 km) apart. Therefore they both competed for local students and had duplicated courses leading to an "uneconomical" use of resources. Additionally, the local authorities in Denbighshire and Flintshire lacked co-operation with each other, especially concerning cancelled pre-war plans to expand the Wrexham college, while the authorities also did not have a mechanism to communicate with Cheshire authorities.

A 1958 report, into the overlapping of the two colleges, recommended that all advanced education courses, aside from metallurgy, be based in Wrexham. Although the panel also mentioned that, if it were possible to re-do the education system, it would have recommended that Chester be the area's centre for education from the start. The latter comment was likely to the displeasure of Welsh people. The recommendation for courses to congregate in Wrexham was acted upon, with courses withdrawn from the Flintshire college, including some of its "newly-developed advanced courses" and the cancellation of plans to develop "sandwich courses" in Flintshire for various engineering fields and applied physics. The latter was shelved due to its similarity to a Cardiff course and concerns that having two similar courses in Wales would lead to insufficient applicants for either. The prioritisation of Wrexham led to tension between the Denbighshire and Flintshire authorities, with Flintshire not accepting it easily. Particularly its advanced chemistry courses, which the Flintshire authority rejected to withdraw and continued to provide them against the panel's recommendation.

In 1966, it was renamed the Flintshire College of Technology, in hopes the college would become a college of advanced technology, as well as aspirations of having a university in North East Wales.

In the mid-1960s, the college offered advanced qualifications in chemistry and fields relating to the area's manufacturing, as part of efforts to support the establishment of a "University of the Air" (now Open University) by Prime Minister, Harold Wilson.

=== Kelsterton College and under NEWI ===
In 1974, the county of Clwyd formed, merging mainly Denbighshire and Flintshire together. In the same year, the college was renamed Kelsterton College (of Technology), and soon after became part of the North East Wales Institute, which included the colleges in Wrexham, namely the Denbighshire Technical College, Cartrefle Teacher Training College and Wrexham College of Art.

From 1974 to 1993, Flintshire's industry had changed, with local steel and textile-making collapsing, whereas an aerospace manufacturing industry developed in the area.

=== Deeside College ===
Logo of Deeside College prior to its merger in 2013.

Entrance to the main building as Deeside College.

In the 1990s, Wales' local government was restructured again, with Clwyd and the seven other counties in Wales, reorganised into the modern 22 principal areas. The splitting of Clwyd made centralising all higher education in Wrexham ill-suited. In anticipation of the restructuring, in 1993, the college separated from NEWI and formed as an independent institution known as Deeside College, following the passing of the Further and Higher Education Act 1992. It had its own board of governors and corporation status. The use of the name Deeside was chosen because it was located in the Deeside industrial zone, and was an entirely new name for the college, separate from past names, allowing for the sub-region to distinguish itself within North East Wales.

Since 1997 and as a result of a new funding system by the Further Education Funding Council for Wales, the college needed to improve efficiency and college finances through an increase of students attending. The college increased investment in student facilities, renovating its buildings, and college financing. It opened "outreach centres" across Flintshire, and established partnerships with primary schools, secondary schools, community centres and libraries, to offer courses in local community venues. As a result of the initiatives, student numbers increased by more than 50%.

On 6 October 1998, the Deeside College Sports Stadium was opened by Ron Davies, Secretary of State for Wales.

In 1999, participated in the development of the Mold Learning Centre in Mold. From 2000 to 2002, the college set up learning centres in local companies such as Airbus UK, Castle Cement, Corus Colors and Merloni Elettrodomestici, as part of partnerships to improve employees' access to education. In 2001, it opened a Netcafe in Shotton.

In 2002, the college was one of the 19 schools to pilot the Welsh Baccalaureate qualification.

In June 2003, the £8 million Deeside College Centre of Engineering Excellence was opened by Queen Elizabeth II. In the same year, the college had 30,000 enrolments to its facilities, including the Connah's Quay campus, Mold Learning Centre, Shotton Netcafe, and the college's more than 20 learning centres across Flintshire.

In 2007, the college received two "outstanding" reports by Estyn and was Wales' first college to achieve the highest possible Grade 1 ratings concerning further education and work-based learning provisions.

In 2008, the college partnered with Barry College, to offer training in Aerospace manufacturing and maintenance.

==== Deeside College Group ====
Deeside College merged with the Welsh College of Horticulture, located in Northop, on 1 August 2009 forming the Deeside College Group, with 20,000 students, more than 800 staff, and an income of almost £30 million. By 2010, the Northop campus spanned 225 acres (910,000 m^{2}).

Also in 2009, it merged with Coleg Llysfasi in Ruthin, Denbighshire. In the same year, Deeside College won the "Modern Apprenticeship Provider" award at the 2009 Modern Apprenticeship Awards Wales, managed by the Welsh Assembly Government. The awarding to the college was described to have made it the "best place in Wales for apprenticeship training".

In 2010, the college launched its own mobile app, allowing students to access college news and information.

By 2011, the group formed one of Wales' largest institutes, encompassing the three colleges, and having almost 22,000 students annually, over 1000 staff and almost £40 million in income. In the same year, Cheryl Gillan, Secretary of State for Wales, described the college as "the best in the UK" and encouraged more businesses to relocate to Flintshire.

=== Merger into Coleg Cambria ===
In February 2012, it was announced that the college would merge with Yale College, Wrexham, later announced in December to be called Coleg Cambria. With the merged college having 27,000 students and 2,000 staff. Following the merger, the name Deeside, in reference to the former independent college, would be retained at the campus. The merger was completed in August 2013.

In May 2008, the college's Construction Skills Centre was opened by Anne, Princess Royal. In 2015, Coleg Cambria announced plans to build a Higher Education centre on the Connah's Quay campus.

In 2016, the Deeside Sixth Form Centre was opened on the campus, costing £14.6 million, and was opened by Carwyn Jones, First Minister of Wales.

In August 2024, Coleg Cambria opened a £230,000 Esports arena on the Connah's Quay campus and is one of a few further education gaming complexes in the country.

== Campus ==
Coleg Cambria's Deeside campus is located in Kelsterton, Connah's Quay, which were of the former Deeside College. It is one of the five campuses of the college. The campus hosted, in 2010, the North Wales Indoor Athletics Centre (opened in 2005), a multisports hall, the Deeside Stadium, a gym, hair, beauty and therapy salons, as well as a cafe, restaurant and bar. The stadium contains a full-size football pitch, a running track, and is home to the Connah's Quay Nomads F.C. and a local athletic club.

The main building of the campus is a low-rise brick building, with a matchbox clock tower, to the designs of R. W. Harvey, the county architect, in a degenerative International Style. To its right are pitched roofs of various styles, while future extensions of the building have adopted styles of later eras. The main building's construction began in 1948.

When it opened in 1952, the college's buildings spanned 20 acres (81,000 m^{2}). In 1956, the college had one gymnasium, three large (undrained) fields, and a theatre, which was also used as a sports hall. By 1961, 16 acres (65,000 m^{2}) of playing fields were opened. On 6 July 1962, seven-lane athletics cinder track, costing more than £5,000, was opened as the college hosted the North Wales AAA Championships.

Until 2003, the college displayed the Fairey Gannet outside the front of the college. It was the first turbo-prop aeroplane to land on an aircraft carrier. The model entered production in 1953, and into operation in 1955. The college bought a surplus Gannet in 1970 for £750, with it flown from RAF Lossiemouth to Hawarden Airport in 1971, and towed to the college by a tractor. It was dismantled and donated to the South Yorkshire Aircraft Museum in 2003.

The Coleg Cambria Deeside campus hosts facilities associated with aeronautics, advanced motors, motor vehicles, engineering, joinery and woodwork, plumbing and heating, and brickwork. It also has an athletics track and a salon. The campus also contains Deeside Sixth, a sixth form centre opened in 2016. It hosts studios, labs and suites for art, product design, drama, science and ICT. As well as lecture theatres, a library and a cafe.
