= Chris Hughes (football manager) =

Welsh football manager (born 1979)

Personal information
- Date of birth: 12 September 1979 (age 47)
- Position: Midfielder

Senior career*
Years	Team	Apps	(Gls)
- Buckley Town

Managerial career
- 2013–2024: Newtown
- * Club domestic league appearances and goals

Chris Hughes (born 12 September 1979) is a Welsh football manager and former player. He managed the Cymru Premier club Newtown from November 2013 to January 2024, leading them to the Welsh Cup final in 2015 – their first since 1897 – and three qualifications for UEFA competitions.

== Football career ==
Hughes played as a midfielder or forward for Buckley Town. He then worked as an assistant manager at that club, Rhyl, Caersws and Prestatyn Town. Hughes left his post at Prestatyn after four years to become manager of Newtown on 5 November 2013. The club's previous manager Bernard McNally had left to be head of youth at Shrewsbury Town. Newtown regularly finished low in the table before Hughes's arrival, having been spared relegation from the 2011–12 Welsh Premier League because of the conditions of other clubs. On Hughes's debut on 8 November, the team won 4–0 away to Connah's Quay Nomads.

In the 2014–15 Welsh Cup, Hughes led Newtown to their first final since 1897, with a 2–1 home win over Rhyl in the semi-finals. The team lost the final 2–0 to The New Saints at their own Latham Park ground on 2 May 2015. Fifteen days later, they won 2–1 away to Aberystwyth Town in the play-off final to qualify for the UEFA Europa League; Tomos Hughes of the North Wales Pioneer named him Manager of the Season for this feat.

In Newtown's first European games since the 1998–99 UEFA Cup, Hughes led Newtown to home and away 2–1 wins over Valletta of Malta in the first qualifying round in July 2015; the next round was a 5–1 aggregate loss to FC Copenhagen.

In May 2021, Hughes's club defeated Caernarfon Town 5–3 away to qualify for the UEFA Europa Conference League. He then signed a contract for another two years. In July, his team were eliminated 5–0 on aggregate by Dundalk of the Republic of Ireland in the first qualifying round. Hughes suggested that Welsh football should be played through the summer like the League of Ireland in order to be more competitive in European qualifiers.

A third-place finish in the 2021–22 Cymru Premier led to a second consecutive Conference League qualification, the first time in Newtown's history that they played in Europe for two consecutive seasons. Hughes's club won 6–4 on aggregate over HB Tórshavn of the Faroe Islands in the first qualifying round before falling 6–2 over two games to FC Spartak Trnava of Slovakia in the second.

On 10 January 2024, following three successive defeats, Hughes resigned from Newtown; the team were already guaranteed a top-six finish. He said he was proud that his first managerial job had lasted over a decade, but said that the club was now in a safe place to move on, and he wanted to spend more time with his family.

== Personal life ==
Hughes has worked in sports development for Wrexham County Borough Council. He is a lecturer in football coaching at Wrexham University.
