= School of Creative Arts, Wrexham =

Art school of Wrexham University, Wales

School of Creative Arts
- Ysgol y Celfyddydau Creadigol (Welsh)
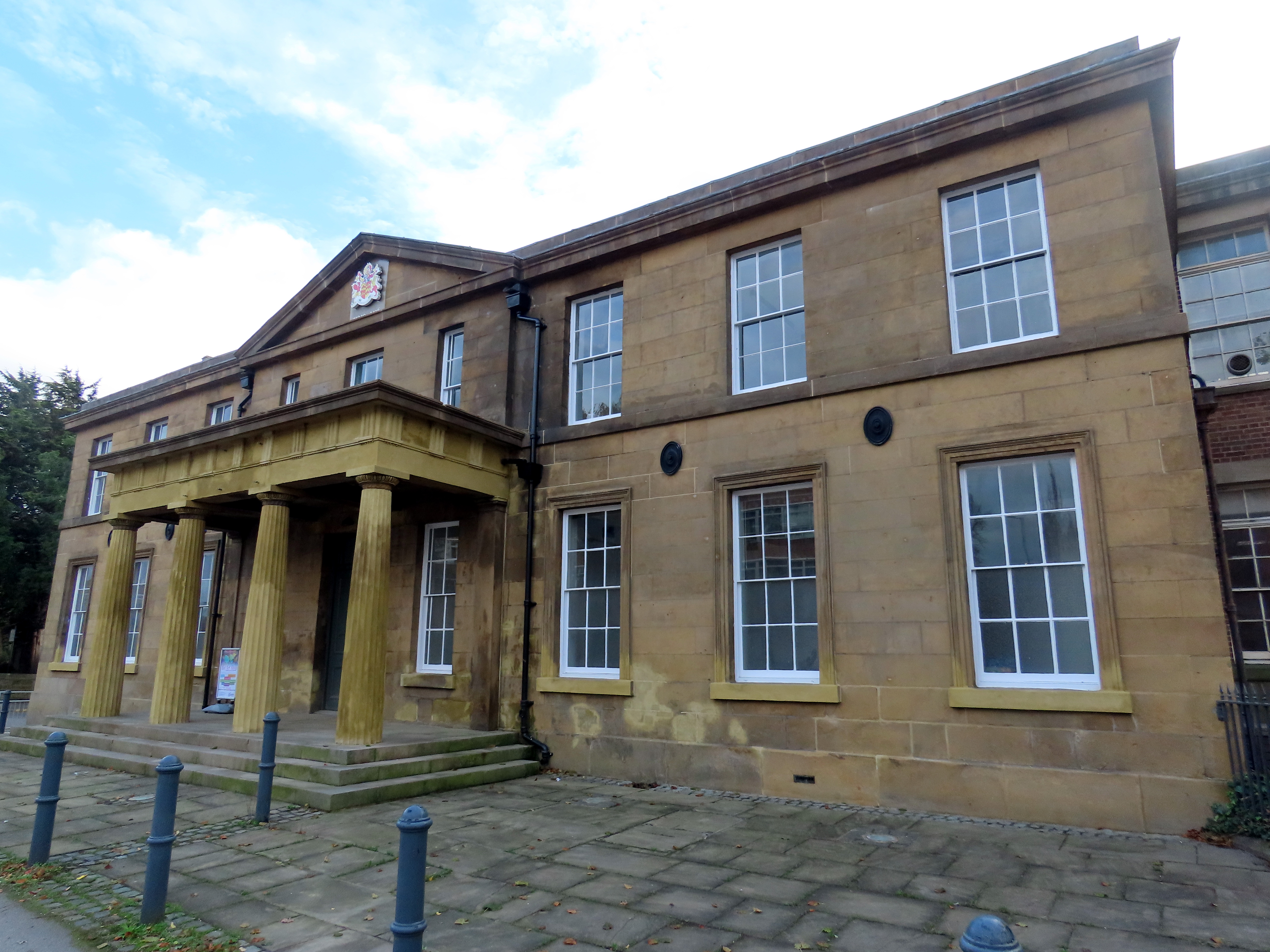
- Other names: College of Art; North Wales School of Art and Design
- Type: University art school
- Established: 1927 (as an art school)
- Academic affiliation: Wrexham University
- Location: Wrexham, Wales
- Building details
- Location in Wrexham city centre
- Former names: Wrexham Infirmary; Wrexham Hospital and Dispensary

General information
- Type: Infirmary (1838–1926); Technical college (1927–1950s); Art school (1950s–present)
- Architectural style: Neoclassical
- Coordinates: 53.04789°N 2.99958°W
- Opened: 1838
- Client: Wrexham Infirmary (1838–1926); Denbighshire Technical College (1927–1975); North East Wales Institute of Higher Education (1975–2008); Wrexham (Glyndŵr) University (2008–present)

Design and construction
- Architect: Edward Welch

Listed Building – Grade II
- Official name: Former Wrexham Infirmary
- Designated: 22 March 1990; Amended 31 January 1994
- Reference no.: 1804

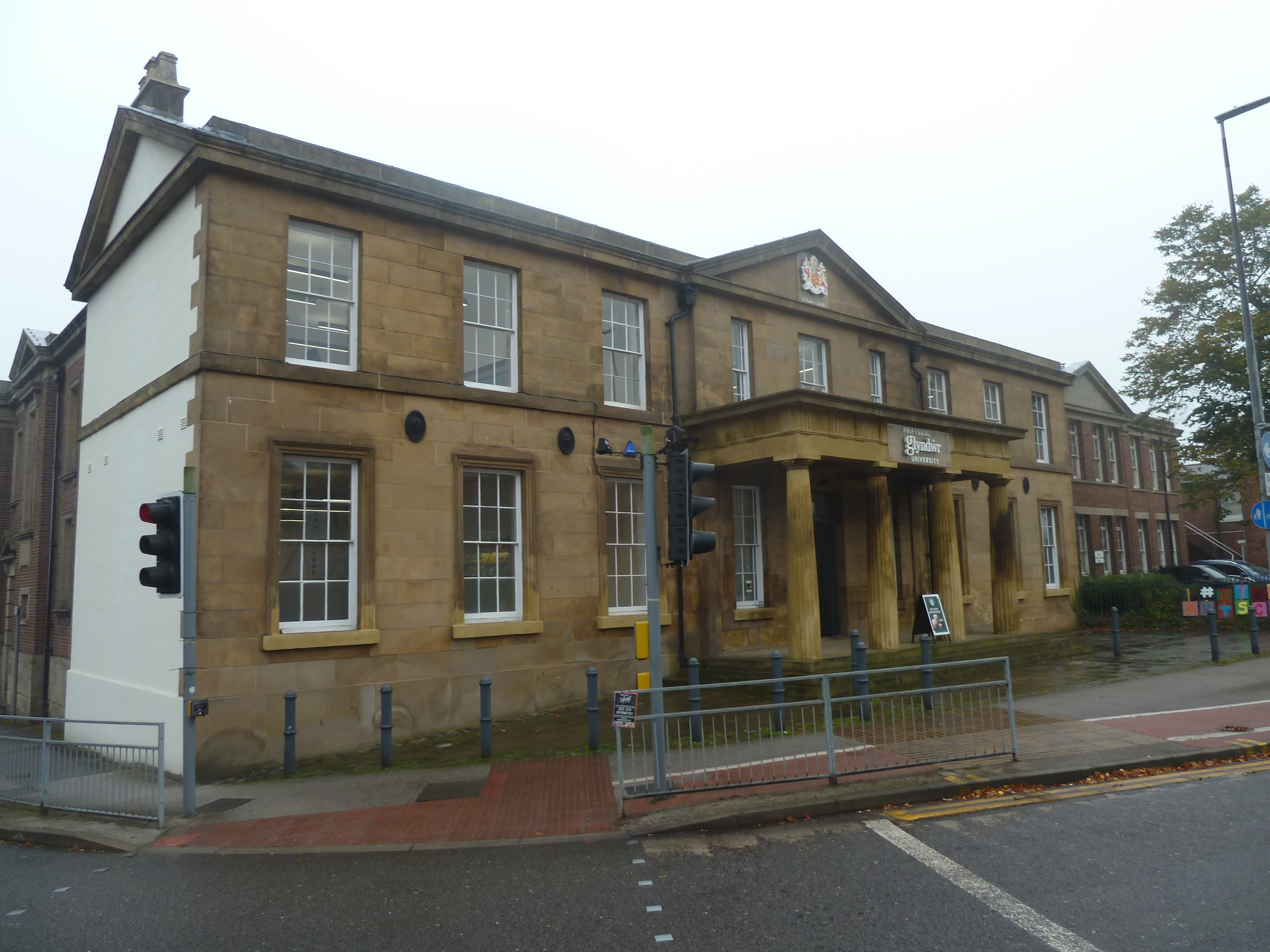
The building from the corner of Regent Street and Bradley Road. The grounds were replaced with a widened road in the 20th century.

The School of Creative Arts (SCA; Welsh: Ysgol y Celfyddydau Creadigol) is the art school of Wrexham University on Regent Street, in Wrexham, North Wales.

Situated in the former Wrexham Infirmary, a Grade II listed building built in 1838 to the designs of Edward Welch, the building operated as a hospital until 1926. The modern school houses a studio, workshop space and art shop in the building.

== Description ==
The building is Grade II listed. It was designed by Edward Welch, in a Neoclassical style.

The building has a Neo-Classical front and entrance. When built, it originally was set in its own grounds, surrounded by gardens and trees, however these were removed in the 20th century for the widening of roads following an increase in traffic in the area. The building has a stone portico on its front, which was a financed gift from Thomas Taylor Griffith, who has played a role in the infirmary's establishment and served as the hospital's physician.

The two-storey building is ashlar faced and has a slate roof, with the later additions being largely brick. There is plain overlight on its centre double doors.

== History ==
The institution of the Wrexham Infirmary preceded the construction of the building. The Wrexham Dispensary (later the Wrexham Infirmary) was founded in May 1833 on Yorke Street by Watkin Williams Wynn, following the efforts of Thomas Taylor Griffith, a local physician who had attended Princess Victoria (later Queen Victoria) who had taken ill during a visit at Wynnstay. The Yorke Street infirmary lacked facilities for in-patients, which increased the need for a new infirmary to be built to replace it. In 1837, a three-day bazaar was held in Wrexham to raise funds for its replacement, with £1,053 (equivalent to £101,931 in 2025) raised.

=== Building ===
The building on Regent Street was built in 1838–39 as The Infirmary, at the cost of £1,800 (equivalent to £172,532 in 2025), which was raised from charitable donations. The building aimed to address the growing demand in Wrexham for more health care, especially following the establishment of the Wrexham Dispensary.

In its first year, the infirmary received support from the public, and financial help from benefactors of local businesses.

In 1840, a new in-patients ward was opened in the building, followed by various other additions such as another ward in 1844, an operating theatre in 1862–63, fever wards in 1866–67 and a children's ward and convalescent ward in 1887. By 1848, the infirmary became known as the Wrexham Hospital and Dispensary. One of the wards was named the "Victoria Ward" named after Queen Victoria following her ascension to the throne. By 1844, an estimated 12,000 were treated at the infirmary.

In 1847, the first general anaesthetic to be applied to a patient in Wales occurred in the infirmary. It was applied by Dr. Dickenson, on a patient who had their leg successfully amputated.

The building opened to students in 1887. By the end of the 19th century, the infirmary struggled with finances, and but this was relieved by another public subscription which helped the infirmary add a children's ward in the same year.

In the 20th century, more wards were added to the building, including one named after benefactor Benjamin Piercy (Piercy Ward), one after Edward VII for men, and one after Alexandra of Denmark, Queen consort, for women.

In 1920, the building received a royal visit by King George V, Queen Mary, and Princess Mary.

The building served as an infirmary until its closure in 1925, due to the opening of another hospital in Wrexham. Although by 1918, it was decided the hospital would be moved to a new location to act as a memorial to those lost in World War I. In 1926, the Wrexham and East Denbighshire War Memorial Hospital opened, replacing the Regent Street infirmary, and the Maelor General Hospital, now known as the Wrexham Maelor Hospital, opened in 1934.

Extensions of the building to the Regent Street and Bradley Road elevations appear to date to the early 20th century, possibly inline with its change of use.

There were approved plans to construct student accommodation next to the building, that were due to start in 2019, for a 2021 completion.

As of 2022, the building houses a dedicated studio, workshop spaces and an art shop.

The building completed a refurbishment in February 2022, which started in 2021, as part of the university's Campus 2025 programme. A new Starbucks cafe was created within the building, and the sandstone front portico was repaired.

=== Art school ===
The building opened to students in 1887. Following its closure as an infirmary in 1925, it remained closed and vacant for years, until the newly established Denbighshire Technical College took over the building in 1927, in which the college used the building to run a School of Creative Arts from 1953, following the opening of the college's campus on Mold Road (Plas Coch). The college became NEWI in 1975, and later Glyndŵr University in 2008 (now renamed Wrexham University). At present it continues to serve as the Wrexham Glyndŵr University School of Creative Arts which houses the university's art department for its art and design courses.

In 2011, the university considered closing the school in the building and transferring students to the new Centre for the Creative Industries building on the university's main Plas Coch campus.

The school held a final degree show in May 2016, open to the public.

In June 2016, the school was ranked as the 1st in Wales and 12th in the UK in a list of art and media schools in the 2016 The Guardian University Guide. It previously ranked 43rd in the UK, so a 31-place improvement.

In June 2017, the PERICLO art project by Oriel Wrecsam since 2015, was moved to the school. The project encourages students to be risky and experiment in contemporary visual arts. The project also includes skill building classes.

In June 2018, the school held a summer show of work by its students open to the public.

In 2022, the school was ranked 1st for satisfaction with student feedback in the UK by The Guardian. It was ranked 2nd in Wales, and one of the top 10 in the UK for teaching quality by The Times.

==== Exhibitions ====
In 2016, it held the "Material Matters" exhibition.

In 2023, it held the exhibitions "Faction Unthemed #FU23" and "Overture".

== See also ==
- Tŷ Pawb – art gallery
