= Northop campus =

Joint-operated education campus in Wales

- Campws Llaneurgain (Welsh)
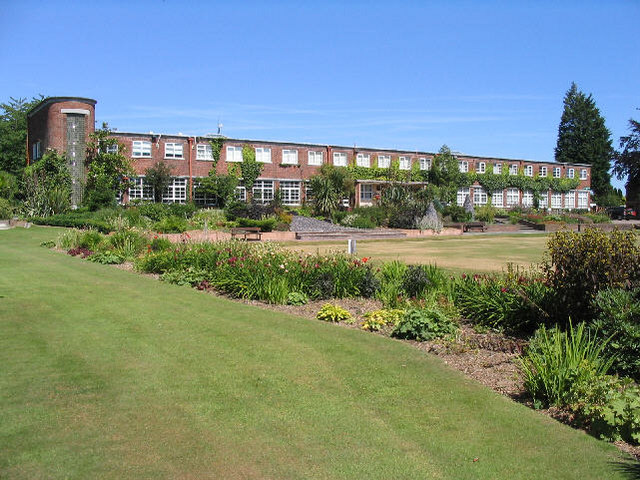
- The main building of the Welsh College of Horticulture in 2006
- Other names: Coleg Cambria Northop; Wrexham University Northop Campus
- Former names: Flintshire Institute of Horticulture / Flintshire Horticultural Institute (1954–1972); Welsh College of Horticulture (1972–2009); Northop Campus of Deeside College (2009–2010, partly); Northop College (2010–2013, partly)
- Type: Horticultural college (1954–2009); Further education and university campus (2009–present)
- Active: 1954–2009; 2009– (as a college and university campus)
- Parent institution: Coleg Cambria; Wrexham University
- Location: Holywell Road, Northop, Mold, Flintshire, CH7 6AA, Wales, United Kingdom; 53.2127°N 3.1450°W

Northop campus stands to the north-west of the village of Northop, Flintshire in North Wales. It is formed of two conjoined campuses of Coleg Cambria (previously Deeside College) and Wrexham University (previously Glyndŵr University), on the grounds of the former Welsh College of Horticulture (Welsh: Coleg Garddwriaeth Cymru), and before that, the Flintshire Institute of Horticulture (or Flintshire Horticultural Institute).

The site was first developed for horticultural education in the 1950s, with the opening of a horticultural institute in 1954. In 1972 it was renamed to the Welsh College of Horticulture. Following financial issues at the college, in 2008 it was announced the college would be taken over by Deeside College and the North East Wales Institute (NEWI). In 2009, the dissolution of the college commenced with its land split between Deeside College and Glyndŵr University (previously NEWI). The eastern area operated by Deeside College were initially described as its "Northop Campus", but later styled the college-operated parts as Northop College from 2010, until Deeside College was merged to form Coleg Cambria in 2013.

== History ==
Horticultural education within Flintshire, was first delivered at Padeswood Hall near Mold, by the University of North Wales in the 1920s. The Padeswood Hall Horticultural centre had 50 acres (20 ha) of land, offering one-year full time courses in Horticulture (particularly market gardening) and Poultry. The centre was eventually taken over by Flintshire County Council (1889–1974).

In 1939, during the start of World War II, courses were curtailed for staff to focus on producing food. Later, the council sold Padeswood Hall to the Tunnel Cement Company which created a cement works on the site.

=== Site at Northop ===
The county council bought Celyn Farm and its 246 acres (100 ha) of land, home of the present site in Northop. This purchase was then split, with the house, building and 60 acres (24 ha) sold to the Lever Brothers, with 186 acres (75 ha) being retained. 40 acres (16 ha) of this retained land was leased to the Lever Brothers, leaving 146 acres (59 ha) to be used for the new college development. The council also owned 40 acres (16 ha) of woodland, but this was separated from the soon to be college by the 40 acres (16 ha) leased to the Lever Brothers, therefore the woodland was leased to a forestry company who set up a commercial softwood plantation.

The county council had originally intended for the establishment of a "County Institute of Agriculture" on the site, however the Ministry of Agriculture, who oversaw agricultural education, opposed this development citing the already existing Institute of Agriculture at Ruthin.

The council's director of education, B. Haydn Williams, was determined to build a college on the site, so persuaded the authority to construct the Flintshire Horticultural Institute on the site, completed in 1954. The institute's first principal was A.G.C. Powell, while the first course, a National Certificate of Horticulture course, for 12 students began in September 1955. A subsequent one-year junior Agriculture course began in 1956, and the institute's student numbers increased to 16. It had no part-time students at the time, and of those that were full-time students, a majority of them were residents. Accommodation was provided for 26 students, contained within one building, standing alongside the principal's house, on top of a hill, and in the early years both were surrounded by 135 acres (55 ha) of "bleak" land, devoid of the trees, woodlands or gardens that stand on the grounds today.

In 1958, A.G.C. Powell left and Mr Mitchelmore was appointed principal. Afterwards many of the site's infrastructure, its roads, fences, water supplies and paths, were installed by students as they underwent practical teaching. Most of the institute's land was dedicated to agricultural production work. Principal Mitchelmore also oversaw the expansion of the institute's campus and curriculum over the following years. Horticulture and agriculture part-time courses began being delivered, as were an organised proficiency test and tests in farm and farmhouse crafts. The farm rotational system was modified to include field vegetable cropping, while existing stock yards were converted and developed into engineering workshops and vegetable packing facilities. This attracted students who previously were sent to Kelsterton College for estate maintenance, building skills and some engineering courses. The establishment of an engineering facility allowed the site to begin teaching a course to award a City and Guilds certificate for agricultural mechanics.

=== Welsh College of Horticulture ===
In 1972, the institute was renamed the Welsh College of Horticulture, following an announcement at its presentation of awards on 11 July, of whom Anne, Princess Royal, was in attendance to present awards.

In 1974, the county of Flintshire and the neighbouring county of Denbighshire were merged to create the county of Clwyd. Following this merger, all agricultural courses on the site, except for Agricultural Engineering, were taken over by the Ruthin-based Llysfasi College. The Northop site instead pioneered floristry education, developing its courses on the subject and opening a commercial floristry shop and later Plant Centre.

The college expanded through the early 1960s to early 1980s, taking back the 40 acres (16 ha) leased to the Lever Brothers and the 40 acres (16 ha) of commercial woodland, with ornamental grounds expanded into these lands. During this period, an association football, cricket and hockey pitches, a sports hall, new lecture rooms, and a 46-student hostel with staff and social areas, were constructed. The site's main common room would also start becoming the college bar. Also constructed was 1-acre (0.40 ha) of computer-controlled glass with a packhouse, potting shed and store. The site's implement shed was converted to a building skills workshop, while the previous potting and packaging shed became the site's environment laboratory and two practical demostration rooms.

The college's focus was initially on developing its full-time residential courses being open to nationwide recruitment, but changes to the funding regime that emphasised local recruitment, led the college to expand its part-time and adult-continuing education programmes. The college also broadened its curriculum base with courses delivered in conjunction with Llysfasi.

From 1998 to 2004, the college's enrollment increased from 1,300 to almost 9,000. This is accredited to the college operating a series of commercial businesses, such as a training company, a landscaping company, and a production nursery, florist shop and garden centre based at the college's site. In 2005, Estyn rated the college at Grade One for its land-based studies and Grade Two for caring and health. By 2006, it had offered further and higher education courses such as animal management, floral design and garden planning.

==== Financial issues, merger and division ====
In 2006, the college announced it would cut fifteen support jobs of its 280 workforce to meet a £200,000 funding shortfall.

In 2008, the Welsh Assembly Government told the college's govenors it had lost confidence in the college's competence to handle public funding. The college wanted its overdraft increased from £200,000 to £300,000 by the government refused citing the failure of the college's inability to safeguard its solvency. Although in 2008 it had made a profit, turning around its finances through strict management controls. In mid-2008 the college announced it would be taken over by Deeside College and the North East Wales Institute. This follows the loss of government confidence that the college can manage its finances, with no further action to be taken by the government following a merger.

In April 2009, three of the college's officials were suspended by its board of governors, including the suspension of the principal, vice-principal and the head of horticulture, following a staff complaint.

On 1 August 2009, the Welsh College of Horticulture was dissolved by The Welsh College of Horticulture (Dissolution) Order 2009. The former college's property, rights and liabilities were split between Deeside College and Glyndŵr University (previously NEWI), with the college taking the eastern part of the campus containing the land with most of its buildings, the university taking the western parts, while land north of the A55 road was to be jointly operated by the two. The provision of further education at the site was transferred to Deeside College, while higher education provision came under Glyndŵr University. The Deeside College-operated part was renamed the Northop Campus of Deeside College. Following the merger, £3 million of Welsh Assembly Government funding was announced for Deeside College and Glyndŵr University to fund upgrades to the Northop site.

In late 2009, the Deeside College Group announced it would be closing the Northop Garden Centre on the college's site following years of financial losses.

In 2010, work was underway to develop the £3 million learning centre on the college's site. It was funded by the Welsh Assembly Government, and would be two floors, with classrooms, a library, catering outlet and offices. Later on 1 August 2010, Deeside College announced it would rename the Northop Campus of Deeside College to just Northop College.

=== Recent history ===
In February 2012, it was announced that Deeside College would merge with Yale College, Wrexham, later announced in December 2012 it would be called Coleg Cambria when established. With the merged college having 27,000 students and 2,000 staff.

In March 2012, the college's £1.8 million Small Animal Care Centre opened, containing viewing areas, an aquarium and 140 different species. It was funded by the Welsh Government and opened by Iolo Williams.

In 2013, a rare breeds centre opened on the college's campus, with it centred on farm animals with Welsh origins. It contains a mini rainforest and desert biomes for students. By 2013, the college is said to have held the title of "Centre of Excellence for Floristry and Production Horticulture". In August 2013, Coleg Cambria began its operations of the college-operated part of the site following The Coleg Cambria (Incorporation) Order 2013, which replaced Deeside College. Coleg Cambria simply calls the site "Northop".

In 2022, Coleg Cambria announced plans to consolidate all of its animal courses at the site, while its Llysfasi site focuses on being an agriculture and agricultural education centre. The equestrian and horticulture programmes were announced to no longer be provided on the site. The Northop site's facilities and courses would develop to continue its courses for learns with Additional Learning Needs. Other improvements to the former horticultural and engineering buildings, the library, catering, and animal experience and training were also planned.

In 2023, Wrexham University's Xplore! Science Discovery Centre, announced a environmental science hub on woodland near the university campus.

== Campus ==
The campus is located just outside Northop, and dates to the 1950s. It comprises beige and red brick buildings, with the college campus spanning 225 acres (91 ha). By 2009, it included ancient woodlands, wood plantations, glasshouses, ornamental gardens, a hardy ornamental plant nursery, a plant centure, an Equine Unit, sports hall, accommodation, common rooms, and areas for practical work. The site's main building is the site of administration, lecture rooms, refectory, finance, a Resources Centre, IT and learning support.

In 2006, it had 300 full-time and 4,000 part-time students. While in 2013, the college had 3,500 full-time and 10,000 part-time students, for a range of further and higher education courses, work-based learning, short courses and leisure programmes.

=== Coleg Cambria ===
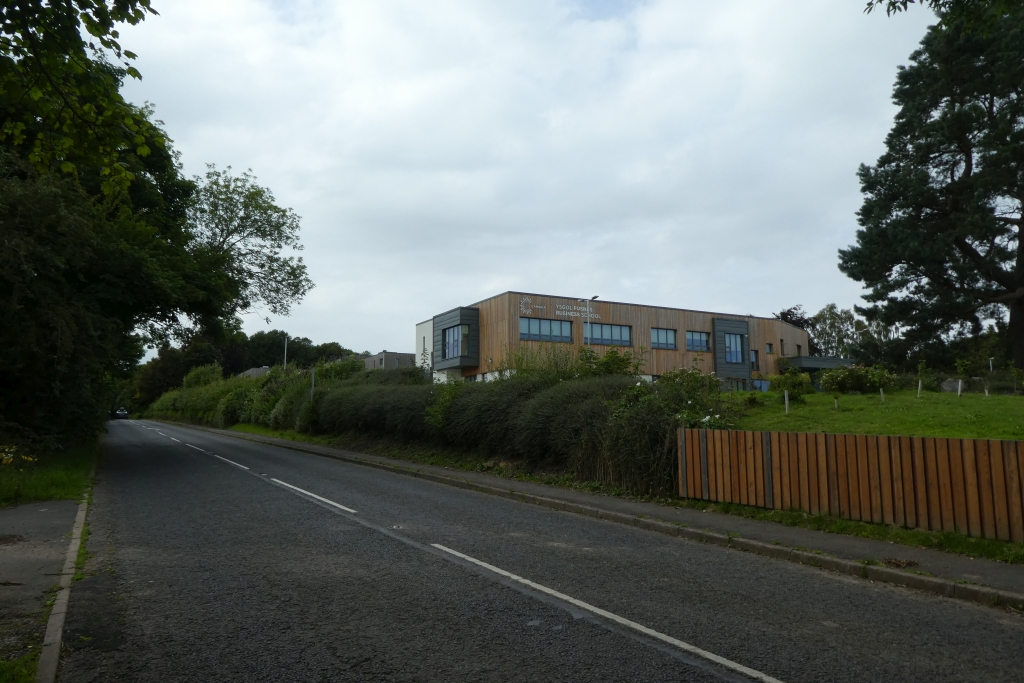
The Cambria Business School, taken from the nearby road

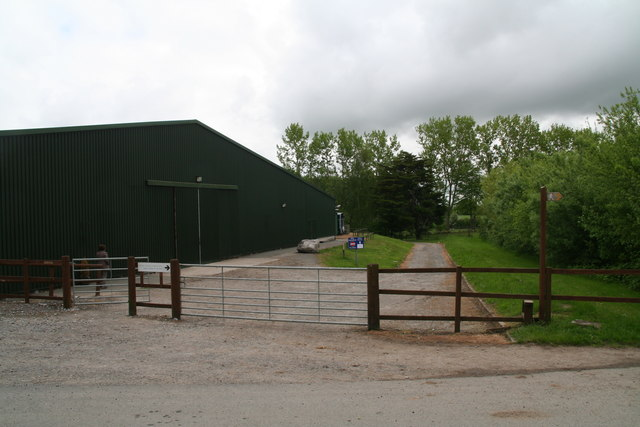
A riding area on the college's site

Coleg Cambria Northop is the site of a large part of the college's animal care provision. The campus contains an animal centre, Cambria Business School, the Independent Life Skills Centre, learning zones, a cafe, a farm animal centre, motor & woodwork workshops, a horticulture garden and a library.

It is one of the five campuses of Coleg Cambria, alongside the Deeside, Llysfasi, Yale (Grove Park Road), and Bersham Road sites.

In 2013, the college campus had an equine centre with 25 horses, an indoor arena with a seating gallery, a Small Animal Care Centre, a cross-country course and an outdoor riding area.

=== Wrexham University ===
The Northop campus of Wrexham University (previously Glyndŵr University and the North East Wales Institute) specialises in Animal Behaviour, Equine Science, Welfare and Conservation, and Veterinary Nursing. The university campus has about 100 students annually. The university's Veterinary Nursing Clinical Suite is located on the site. It is one of the university's three campuses, the others being in Wrexham and St Asaph. Horticulture Wales is also based on the university campus.
