= Cardiff Sixth Form College =

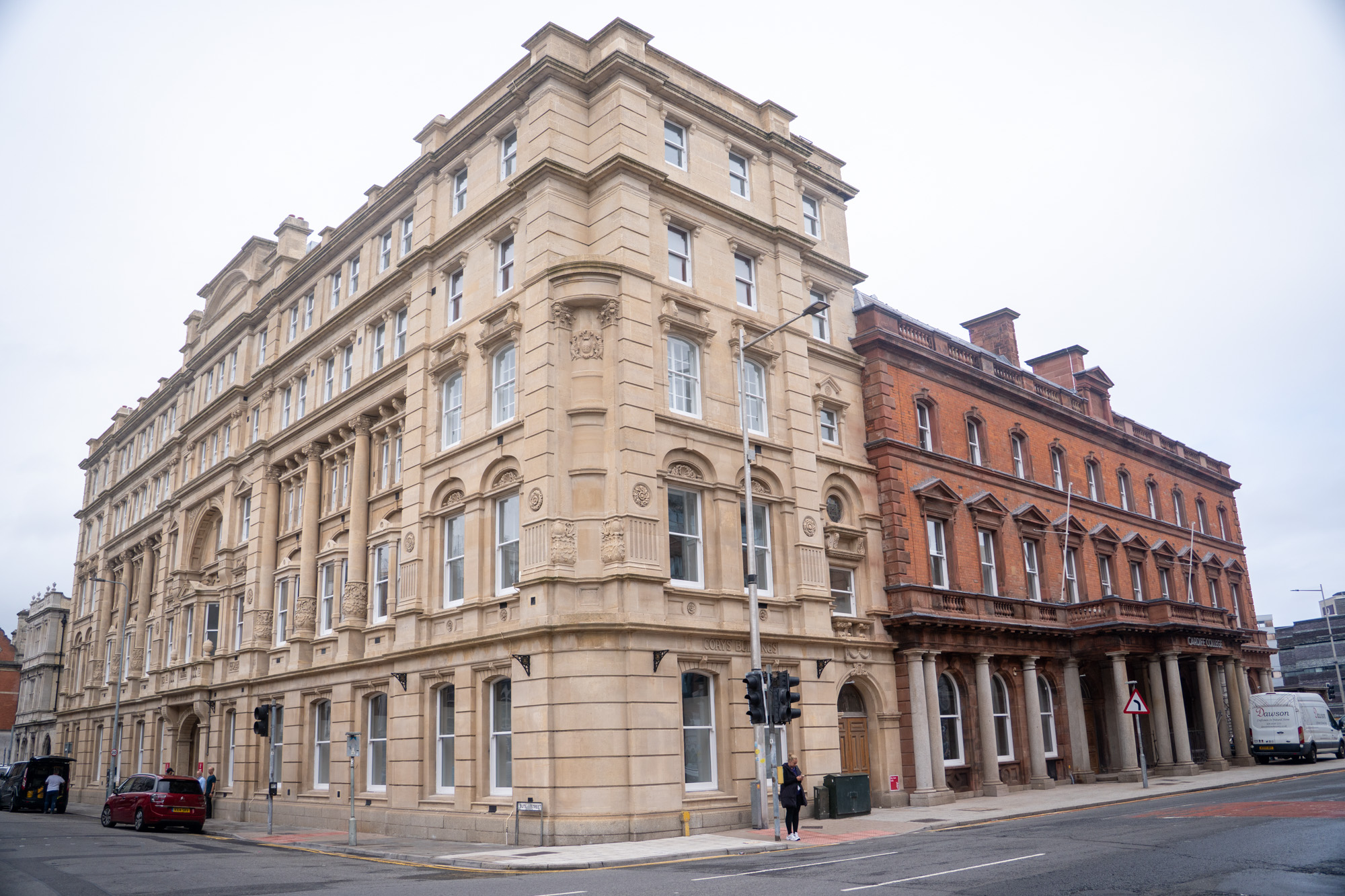

Location
- Merchant Place, Bute Street, Cardiff, CF10 5AD; Wales; 51.4844°N 3.1675°W

Information
- Type: Sixth form college
- Motto: Inspire, Reach and Achieve Academic Excellence
- Established: 2004
- Department for Education URN: 402394 Tables
- Principal: Tom Arrand
- Gender: Mixed
- Age: 15 to 19
- Houses: Morgan, Wallace, Seacole, Bevan, Franklin, Novello, Campbell
- Website: www.ccoex.com

Cardiff Sixth Form College, colloquially abbreviated as CSFC, is a private boarding school with campuses in Cardiff and Cambridge. CSFC has ranked number one in league tables published by The Times and The Telegraph for four consecutive years, and number one in the UK for A-level results for 12 out of the past 13 years.

The college also has a history of success in NASA engineering competitions and a notable legacy within the UK's debate scene.

== History ==
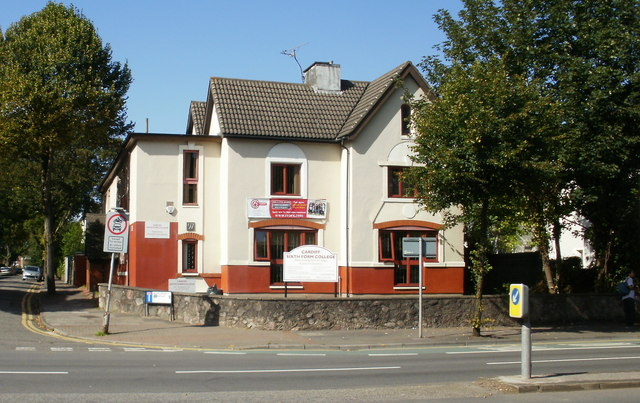
97 Newport Road, Cardiff, the former Cardiff Sixth Form College

The college was established in 2004 as the Cardiff Centre of Excellence (CCOEX), and was originally intended as a private tutorial centre which met regularly in a local church. By 2008, it had become a private company limited by guarantee and had moved to a residential house on 97 Newport Road. In 2012, it was renamed the Cardiff Sixth Form College, and the college moved to its present site at Trinity Court.

The college accepted its first international students in 2009, and was registered as a full boarding school in 2011, after which it began investing in boarding facilities to accommodate a growing international intake. In February 2016, the college was the subject of a BBC One Wales documentary, Britain's Brainiest School, broadcast as part of the How Wales Works strand and directed by Emily Hogan Turner. The documentary followed staff and students over an academic year, including founder Yasmin Sarwar's approach to running the school.

In 2017, the college was acquired by Dukes Education, becoming part of its group of schools. In 2022, it opened a second campus in Cambridge, citing growing international demand for places. A new Cardiff campus, reported to cost around £90 million, was opened in September 2026.

== New development ==
Cardiff Bay Development

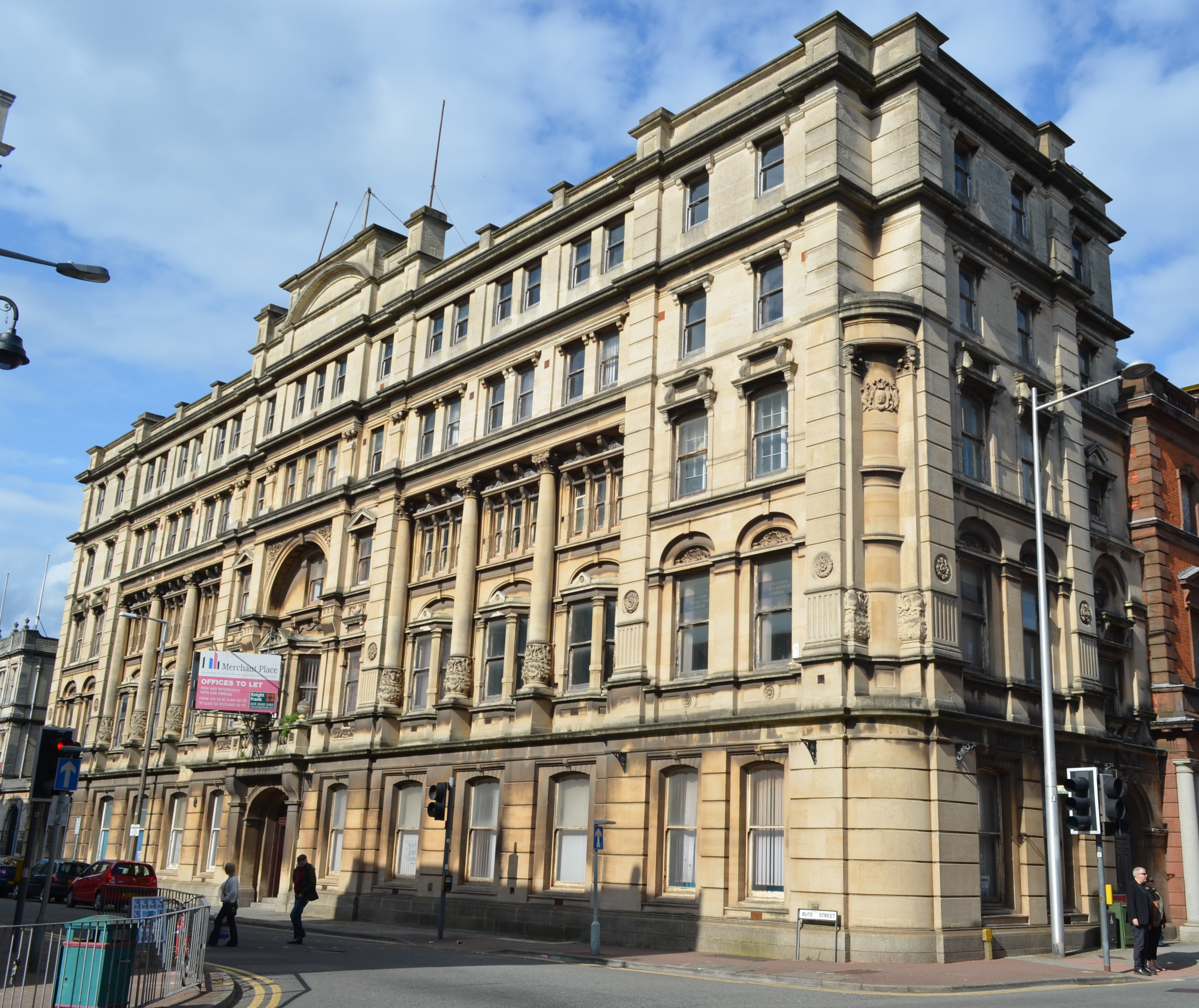
Cory's Building, 57 Bute Street

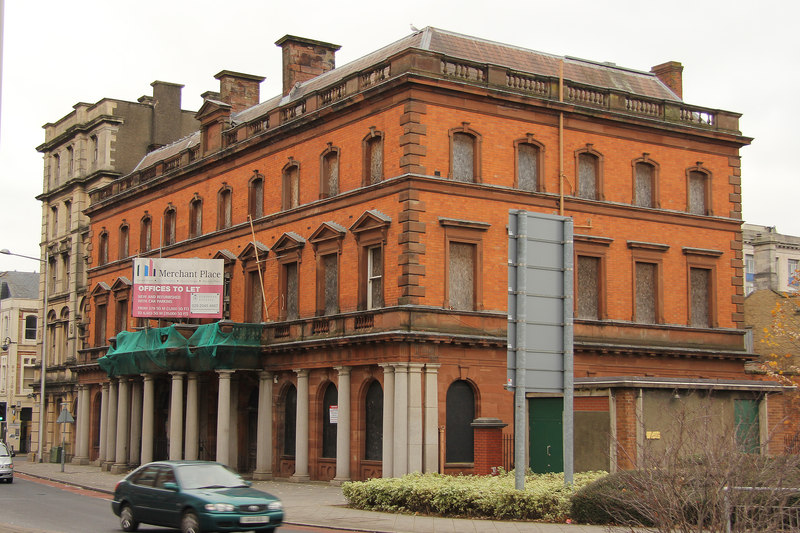
Merchant Place, 1 and 3 Bute Place

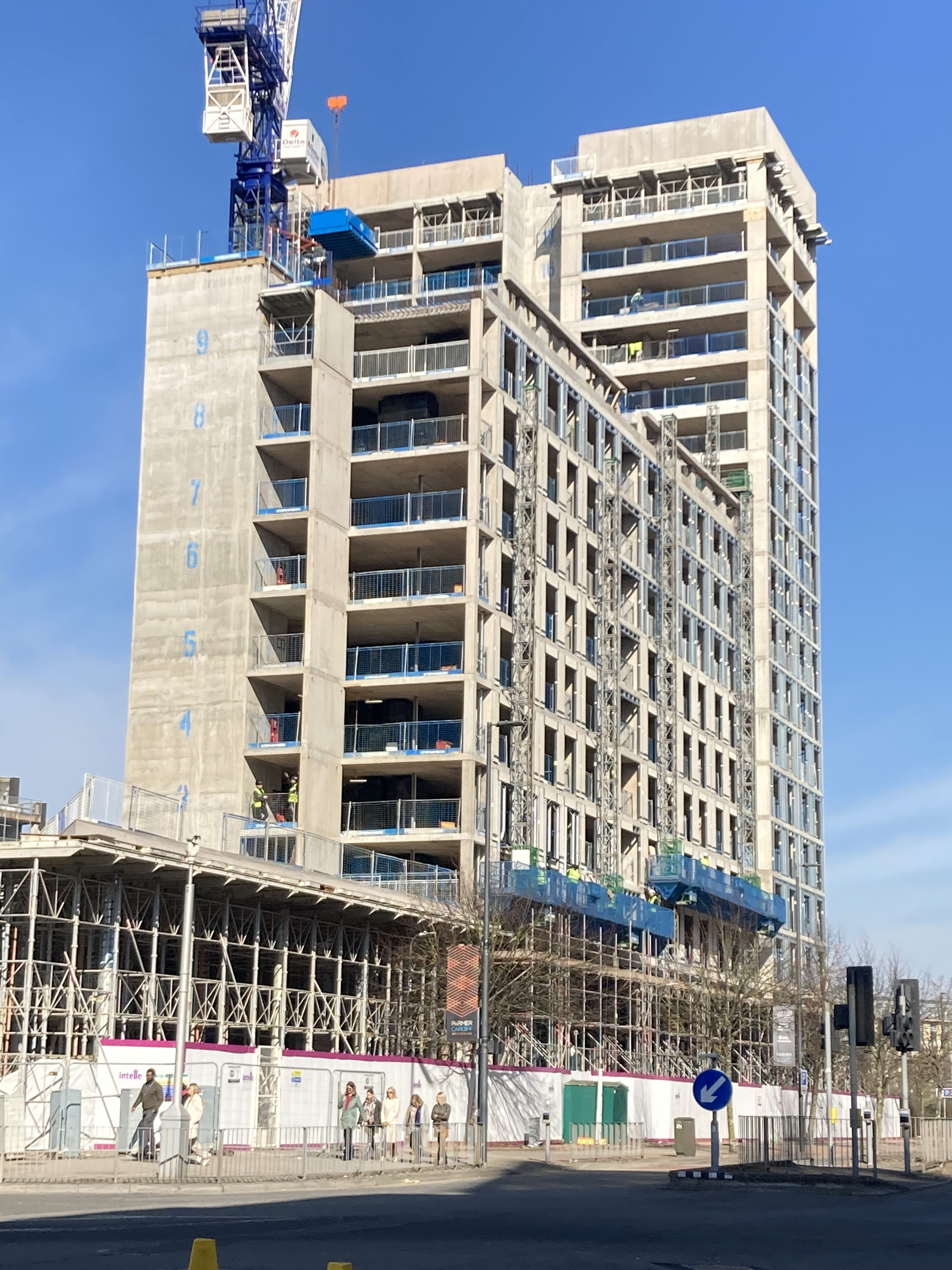
During construction of the Cardiff Sixth Form Boarding Hub for student accommodation

In 2021, the college revealed plans to redevelop Merchant Place in Bute Place and Cory's Building in Bute Street and a new building at the rear. Both Merchant Place and Cory's Building are Grade II listed buildings and form an L shape.

== Aims ==
The college caters for students studying A Levels and GCSE's uses the WJEC exam board for all subjects, but the main emphasis is on providing students with the relevant experiences and skills to enter the university of their choice. The college has also made significant outreach efforts to recruit students from other countries and regions, most notably Botswana, Hong Kong, Malaysia and China.

Since 2013, the college has come top amongst other independent schools in the UK in league tables. It also has a long history in the NASA Space Settlement Design Competition and in local debate competitions.

== Inspections ==
The first inspection of the college by Care Inspectorate Wales took place in 2016. No areas were identified where the college exceeded National Minimum Standards. Twelve recommendations were made.

In November 2023 the college received an inspection from Estyn. The report summarised that "Pupils at Cardiff Sixth Form College achieve exceptionally high public examination results." and "The school has strong leadership that oversees the implementation of an appropriate curriculum, highly effective teaching, and strong pastoral care". The report made 3 recommendations for improvements.

In April 2025 the college's boarding accommodation was inspected by Care Inspectorate Wales. The report found "The arrangements to safeguard and promote the welfare and well-being of children at Cardiff Sixth Form College are excellent."

== Fees ==
- Boarder fees per year: £77,250
- Day pupil fees per year: £31,050

== Results ==
In 2026, 91.3% of students achieved A*-A grades, whilst 99.3% of students achieved A*-B grades.

Cardiff Sixth Form College has been ranked number one for A-Level results in league tables published by The Telegraph, The Times and best-schools.co.uk

== Legal issues ==
In November 2016, the former trustees of the college were the subject of an inquiry by the Charities Commission due to failure to submit their accounts on time. The Charity Commission has identified regulatory concerns about the charity's governance, financial management and significant related party transactions between the charity and some of its former trustees. An interim manager was appointed to oversee the running of the college over the course of the inquiry. South Wales Police were looking into potential fraud at the college by the former trustees.

In March 2025, South Wales Police charged three people in connection with the investigation. Yasmin Anjum Sarwar, 43, and Nadeem Sarwar, 48, were charged with multiple theft and fraud offences totalling around £5 million, and Ragu Sivapalan, 39, the college's former auditor, was charged with false accounting between 2013 and 2016. Yasmin Sarwar had co-founded the college in 2004 and worked there until 2016, in a role covering academic achievement, pastoral care and marketing.

All three appeared before Cardiff Magistrates' Court on 8 April 2025 and pleaded not guilty. The Sarwars denied nine separate fraud and theft offences, and Sivapalan denied the false accounting charge. The case was sent to Cardiff Crown Court for a pre-trial hearing on 6 May 2025, with the Sarwars released on bail subject to a condition that they not contact each other.
