= Coleg Cambria Yale =

College campus in Wrexham, Wales

Coordinates: 53.0499°N 2.9938°W

Coleg Cambria Yale Campus
- Campws Coleg Cambria Iâl (Welsh)
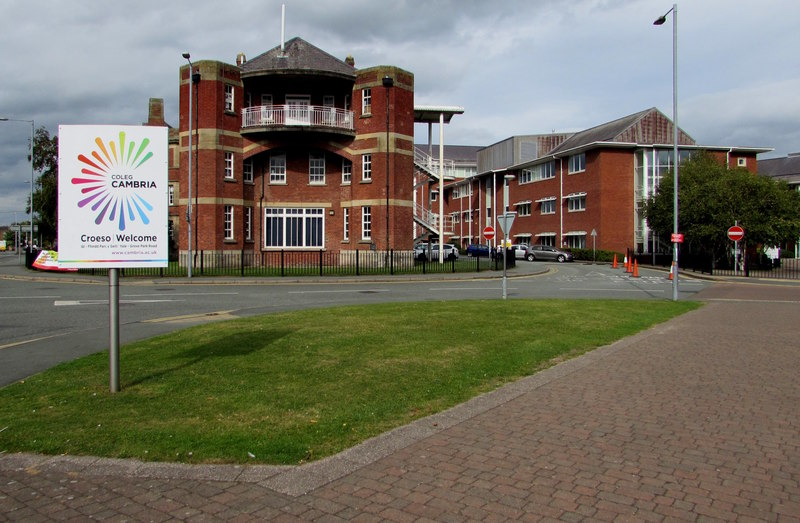
- Road to the Yale Grove Park Road campus
- Former names: Yale Grammar and Technical School (1950–1964); Yale High School (1964–1973); Yale Sixth Form College (1973–1993/5); Yale College, Wrexham; Coleg Iâl, Wrexham (Welsh) (1993/5–2013)
- Part of: Coleg Cambria (since 2013)
- Type: Further education college campuses Independent college (1995–2013)
- Active: 1995–2013 (as a separate college); 2013– (as a campus)
- Location: Grove Park Road, Wrexham, LL12 7AB, Wales, United Kingdom
- Campus: Component, urban
- Website: Coleg Cambria Yale; Bersham Road

Coleg Cambria Yale (Welsh: Coleg Cambria Iâl) consists of two campuses of Coleg Cambria, a further education college, encompassing the grounds of the former Yale College (Coleg Iâl), in Wrexham, North Wales. The main campus Yale Grove Park Road, or simply the Yale campus, is located in Wrexham city centre, while the smaller second campus Yale Bersham Road, or simply the Bersham Road campus, is located to the south-west of Wrexham.

In 2013, the college merged with Deeside College to form Coleg Cambria, that has sites across North East Wales. The former Yale College grounds are now two of the five campuses of Coleg Cambria, alongside the Northop, Llysfasi, and Deeside sites. The name 'Yale' is retained at the campus.

== History ==
The college traces its history to the Yale Grammar and Technical School located on Crispin Lane. It was established in 1950 as a state school, renamed Yale High School in 1964, but became a sixth form college in 1973. The school then began moving from Crispin Lane to its current Grove Park site in 1995, with the Grove Park site opening in 1998. Although Yale College was stated to be founded in 1993.

=== Naming lawsuit ===
In 1999, Yale University sued Wrexham County Borough Council over the use of the name Yale College, used by Yale University's undergraduate college for 225 years. As a result of the settlement of the trademark infringement suit, the Yale College in Wales must always be legally referred to as Yale College in Wrexham or Yale College Wrexham. Both colleges trace their name to Elihu Yale, who is buried in Wrexham. The name Yale itself is an anglicisation of the Welsh name Iâl. The Wrexham side argued the name has deeper historical connection to Wales, predating Christopher Columbus by 500 years, as well as Elihu having family links to Wrexham and never visited the American college. However, the Connecticut college, adopted the name Yale in 1718 and had notable alumni since, while the Wrexham college was founded in 1993.

=== As Yale College of Wrexham ===
Logo of Yale College, Wrexham, prior to its merger in 2013.

In 2002, amid a reorganisation of secondary schools in Wrexham, proposals were put in place for Yale College to buy the Groves School. The school was closed, with its students moving to two other local schools that were modernised as part of the plan. The cost for Yale to buy the school was said to be in need a "major capital investment" to execute. Yale later admitted it could not afford the purchase.

In 2008, the college won the overall award in Wales for quality. Specifically its provisions relating to work-based learning and training. Rhodri Morgan, First Minister for Wales, congratulated the college on its award.

In 2010, the college announced plans to share services with Glyndŵr University to improve local education provision.

By 2011, the college had more than 14,000 students, across its two campuses in Wrexham, Grove Park Road and Bersham Road. The college also utilised a moodle at the time.

=== Merger into Coleg Cambria ===
In February 2012, it was announced that the college would merge with Deeside College, later announced in December to be called Coleg Cambria. With the merged college having 27,000 students and 2,000 staff. Following the merger, the name Yale, in reference to the former independent college, would be retained at the campus. The merger was completed in August 2013.

=== Under Coleg Cambria ===
In 2018, the college announced it would be replacing the Yale site's existing catering, examination, sports and performing arts building with a new three-storey complex.

In 2021, Coleg Cambria opened the Yale site's Hafod building, a £21 million development. The college had also established a partnership with Bangor University to develop recovery and growth strategies and support systems, such as learner reskill efforts, for North Wales industries following the COVID-19 pandemic in Wales.

In 2023, the college announced it would be building a new facility on its Yale site for students studying health, social care and wellbeing. In 2024, the college opened "Ial Spa" on the site.

== Campus ==
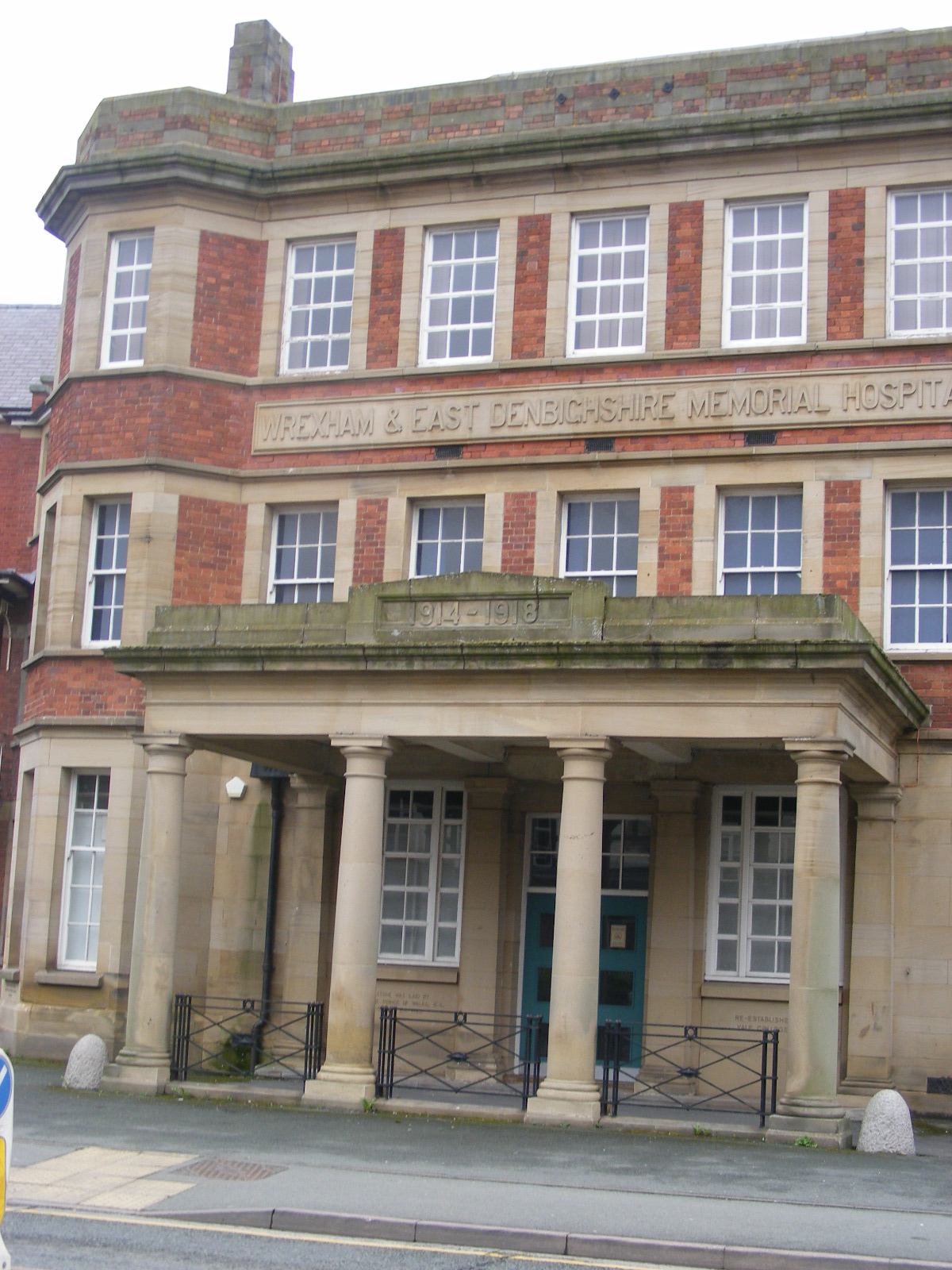
Former Wrexham and East Denbighshire War Memorial Hospital, now the "M Block" of the college.

The college has offered both full and part time courses, It has sites located in the heart of Wrexham, with one of its sites located next to Wrexham bus station. Its two campuses are Yale (on Grove Park Road) and Bersham Road. These comprise two of the five campuses of Coleg Cambria.

The former college, and now one of its campuses, is named after Elihu Yale, the founder of Yale University (based in Connecticut, United States), and is buried at St Giles' Church, Wrexham.

=== Grove Park ===
The Grove Park (Road) campus is located on Grove Park Road, in Wrexham City Centre. It is one of the five campuses of Coleg Cambria. It has science laboratories, library, coffee shop, restaurant, salon, flowershop, computer suite, gym, wellbeing centre, sports halls, sports studio, theatre and arts studios. The site hosts Coleg Cambria's Yale Sixth form college. Yale College had also operated a student magazine under the name "Zed", and a radio station by at least 2011.

The Grove Park campus is based on the old Wrexham and East Denbighshire War Memorial Hospital, which, once vacated of its hospital purpose, was originally proposed to be demolished. However, following a campaign against demolition, the college bought the building and later made it undergo a three-year restoration. This was as part of the college's efforts to open the Grove Park campus in 1998, and as an extension of the former Yale Sixth Form College.

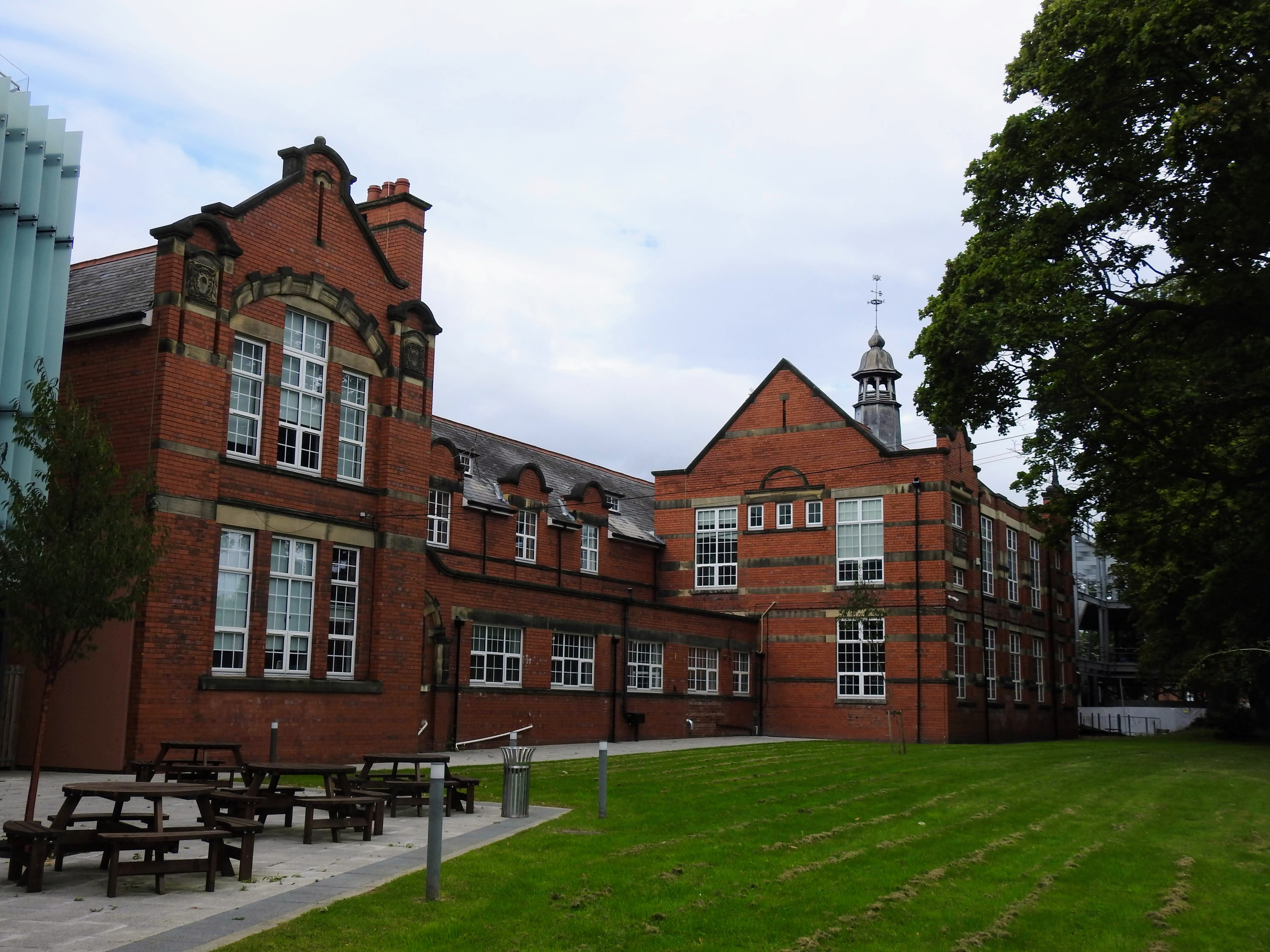
Former Grove Park School buildings, part of Coleg Cambria, on Chester Road.

Before the hospital, these grounds were occupied by two residences, Grove House and Roseneath. With the latter being home to William Low, who founded the Channel Tunnel Company, and led one of the early efforts to construct the Channel Tunnel in 1870, but funding dried up and construction ceased shortly after. Low's tunneling efforts may have inspired him to set up the 1876 Wrexham Arts and Industries exhibition. However most of the campus buildings now used by the college are relatively new. To the west of a campus, along Chester Road, was the site of the former Grove Park School. The boarding school, also known as Groves Academy, was situated in the former Grove House residence, which was converted into a boarding school in 1823.

Located near the entrance of the college is a small garden, and within its centre is an original stone well-head from one of Wrexham's old town wells. To the further side of the well is a copy of Gillian Clarke's Letter From A Far Country. Just over from the well head and over a small hedge are some pillar bases, that are said to be from the old Wrexham Town Hall that was located on High Street. In 2011, the college erected a plaque on its Grove Park campus, honouring Frederick Rosier. Rosier, a former student of the Grove Park County School on which Yale now stands, who was a World War II fighter pilot.

=== Bersham Road ===
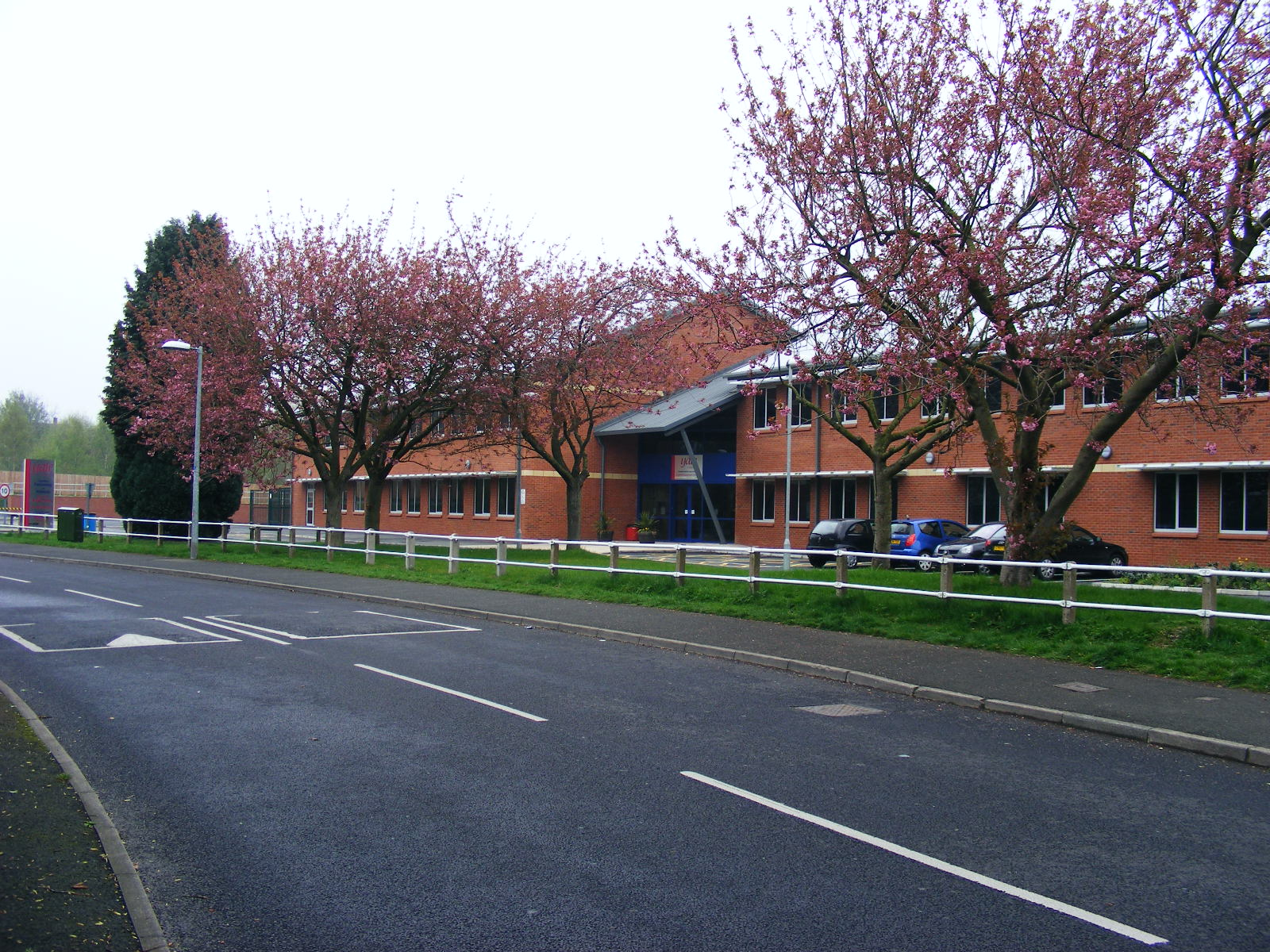
Bersham Road Campus

The Bersham Road campus is the location for the college's vocational courses, such as those relating to bricklaying, engineering and plumbing. It is one of the five campuses of Coleg Cambria.

In 2007, the campus started construction on a £5 million engineering and construction centre.

By 2011, the Bersham Road site had a reception, barbers, cafe, medical centre, common room and IT suite. The site also has facilities delivering education in workshops for electrical installations, plumbing, gas assessment, welding and fabrication, manufacturing, automotives, wet trades, plastering, joinery, paint and decorating, floor laying and brick laying.
