= Pentrecelyn =

Village in Denbighshire, Wales

Coordinates: 53.071°N 3.270°W

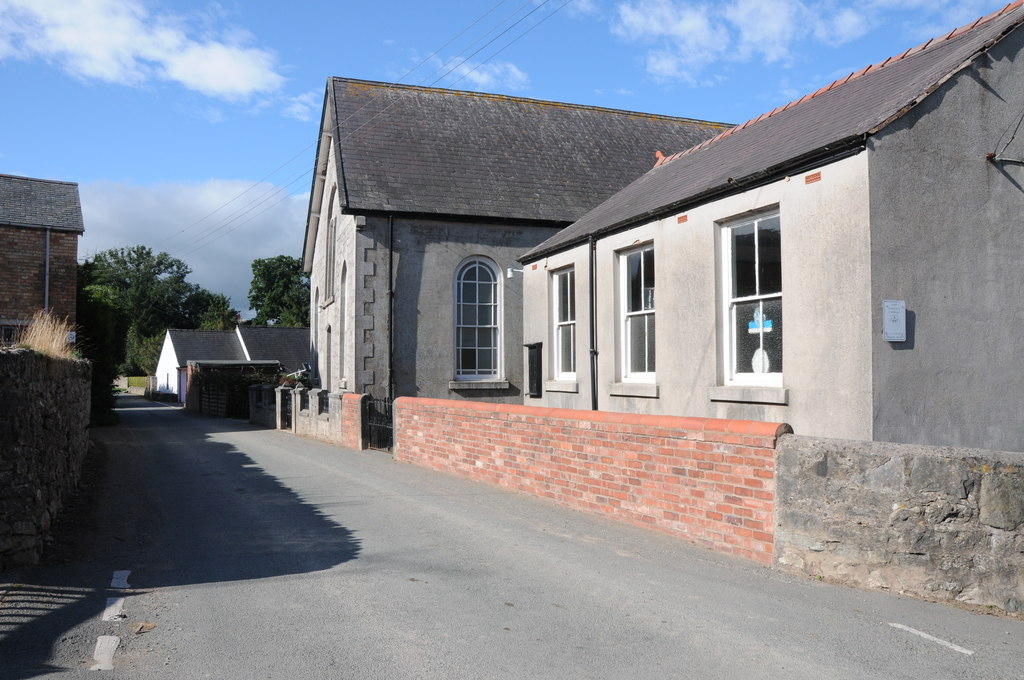
- Chapel in Pentrecelyn

- Location within Denbighshire
- OS grid reference: SJ149534
  - Cardiff: 109.8 mi (176.7 km)
  - London: 171.1 mi (275.4 km)
- Community: Llanfair Dyffryn Clwyd
- Principal area: Denbighshire
- Country: Wales
- Sovereign state: United Kingdom
- Post town: RUTHIN
- Postcode district: LL15
- Dialling code: 01978
- Police: North Wales
- Fire: North Wales
- Ambulance: Welsh
- UK Parliament: Clwyd East
- Senedd Cymru – Welsh Parliament: Clwyd West

Pentrecelyn is a rural village in Denbighshire, North East Wales just off the A525 between Ruthin and Wrexham.

The village can be located by turning off the A525 at Llysfasi college and heading towards Graigfechan.
