= Coleg Cambria =

Further education college in Wales

Coordinates: 53°13′35″N 3°4′42″W

- Motto: An internationally recognised college of excellence
- Type: Further Education College
- Established: 2013
- Director: Yana Williams
- Administrative staff: 1,700
- Students: 27,000
- Location: Wales, United Kingdom
- Campus: Bersham Road; Deeside; Llysfasi; Northop; Yale
- Website: www.cambria.ac.uk

Coleg Cambria in North East Wales is one of the UK's largest colleges, with over 7,000 full-time and 20,000 part-time students, and has international links covering four continents. Coleg Cambria was created following the merger of Deeside College and Yale College, Wrexham. Coleg Cambria began operating on 1 August 2013.

It serves three local authority areas with a total population of almost 400,000: more than 12% of the population of Wales. The college works in partnership with over 1000 employers including Jones Bros Civil Engineering Airbus, JCB, Kelloggs, Kronospan, Moneypenny, UPM Shotton Paper and Village Bakery.

Coleg Cambria won the 2015 Global Enterprise Challenge.

In November 2015, the college was inspected by Estyn and rated excellent in both current performance and prospects for improvement.

== Locations ==
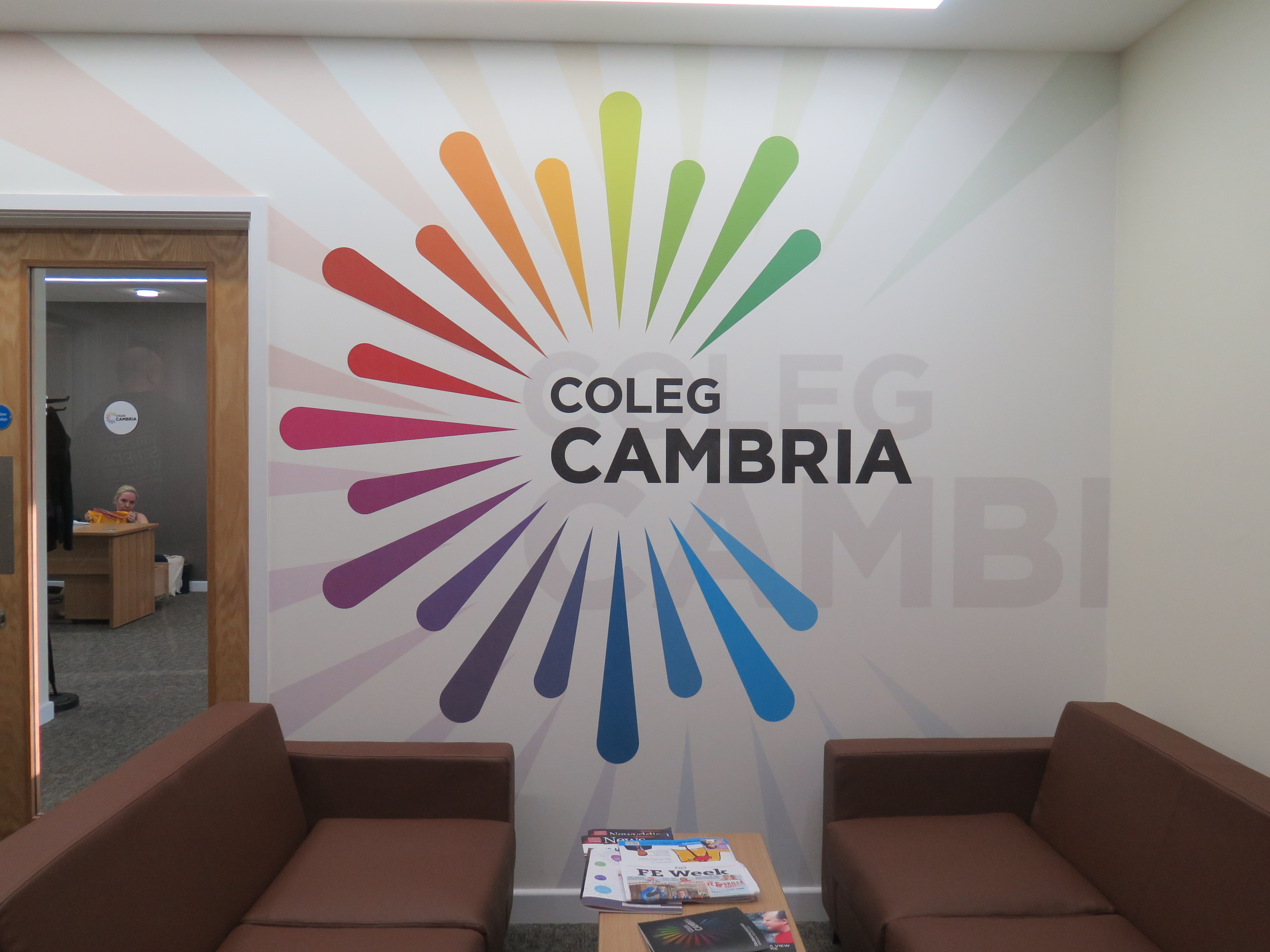
Coleg Cambria logo in CC's Wrexham's offices

Coleg Cambria has five campuses across North East Wales: Deeside, Yale (Grove Park and Bersham Road in Wrexham), Llysfasi and Northop.

== Name ==
Coleg is the Welsh word for college and Cambria is the Latin name for Wales, derived from the Welsh name Cymru.

== Branding and Logo ==
The 'spectrum design' was developed and chosen with support from students, staff, Governors and local businesses and is intended to signify the diversity and inclusivity of the college. The spectrum mark also forms an abstract letter C.
