= Wales Comic Con =

UK fan convention (2008–2024)

- Logo used for the former main Telford event
- Status: Active
- Genre: Comic Convention with Fantasy and Sci-Fi programming, as well as Film, general Television, Gaming and Wrestling.
- Venue: Wrexham University (2008–2018; 2022–24); Telford International Centre (2019–2023); Llangollen Pavilion (2025)
- Locations: Wrexham, North Wales (2008–2018; 2022–24); Telford, Shropshire, England (2019–2023); Llangollen, North Wales (2025)
- Years active: 2008–Present
- Inaugurated: 2008; 18 years ago
- Most recent: 20–21 September 2025; 13 months ago (Llangollen)
- Next event: TBA
- Attendance: ~15,000
- Organiser: Mercury Promotions
- Website: walescomiccon.com

Wales Comic Con (Note: dually-branded as Wales Comic Con: Telford Takeover from 2019–2023 and as Wales Comic Con: Homecoming in 2022) (WCC) is an annual (Note: later bi-annual, and then tri-annual in 2022) fan convention in the United Kingdom, mainly held in North Wales. Founded in 2007, it held its first event in Wrexham in 2008, hosting there until 2018. From 2019 to 2023, the main event moved to Telford, England, due to demands for a larger venue than in Wrexham, although smaller events returned to Wrexham from 2022, alongside the ones held in Telford.

In December 2023, the event organisers announced the convention would no longer be held in Telford. In April 2024, the convention team announced a new convention in Farnborough, England, and no events were held in 2024. In May 2025, organisers announced the September 2025 event would be held in the nearby Llangollen Pavilion, with an additional Wrexham event to be considered in the future.

In 2008 the original event was advertised as a film exhibition then later changing the name to Wales Comic Con. During the move to Telford, it faced criticism for being called Wales Comic Con but not being held in Wales.

== History and venue ==
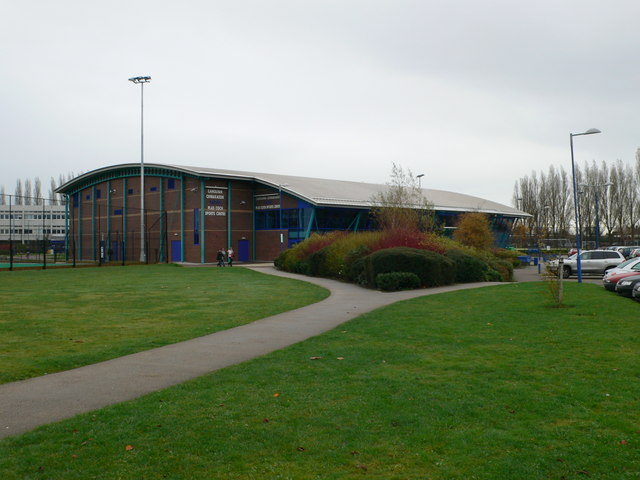
Plas Coch Sports Centre, where the event was first held, although later events were spread out across Wrexham University's campus.

The event was founded in Wrexham, Wales in 2007, with the first convention held in 2008, with around 100–150 visitors. Started as an idea by Jaime Milner of North Wales-based events management company Mercury Promotions, it was first held as a one day a year event, until it was increased to two events a year and included some two-day events.

The event first took place in 2008 at the Plas Coch Sports Centre on Wrexham Glyndŵr University's Plas Coch campus, with 100–150 people. Although by 2012 the event later expanded to neighbouring buildings such as the William Aston Hall and Catrin Finch Centre, until the event covered large parts of the university campus. The event was locally awarded "Best Visitor Event" in the Wrexham Tourism Ambassador Awards.

The December 2017 one-day event attracted 8,000 visitors. The 2018 event was estimated to have 10,000 visitors.

In 2019, the event was stated by Wrexham County Borough Council to bring in more than £1 million to the regional economy.

=== Move to Telford (2019–2023) ===
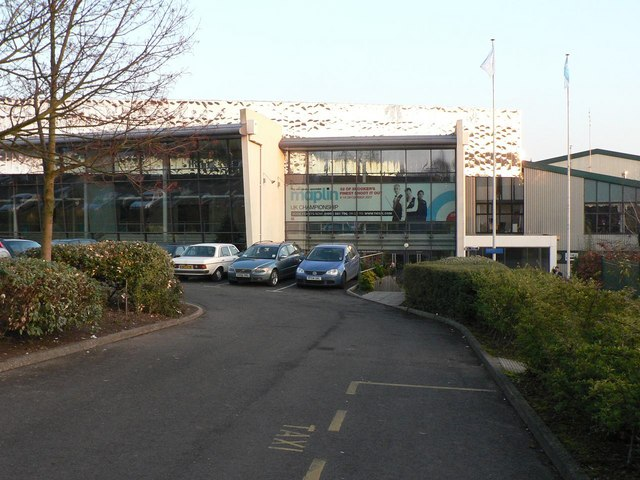
Entrance to the Telford International Centre.

In May 2019, organisers announced that the convention would be moving to Telford's International Centre starting with the December 2019 convention, replacing Wrexham as the event's usual location due to demands for a larger venue. The convention would be branded as "Wales Comic Con: Telford Takeover" from the December event in Telford. The move met opposition in Wales, with Plaid Cymru councillors branding it a "disgrace", and Wrexham County Borough Council stating it was "very disappointed". Aside capacity restrictions, the venue in Wrexham was said to have parking issues, with parking overflowing and impacting nearby side streets. The venue attracts around 10,000 visitors, and the council described it to be bringing "exceptional economic benefits" to Wrexham.

A councillor stated the move "emphasises the need for [...] better facilities [in Wrexham] [...] [and that] the Welsh Government and Wrexham Council should reflect on this failure". The same councillor also criticised the government's support for a centre (ICC Wales) in Newport and the lack of investment of an equivalent site in North Wales. Plaid Cymru MS Bethan Jenkins hoped a Welsh venue can be found for the event, but questioned that the event could not be called "Wales Comic Con" if held in England.

At the first event in Telford in December 2019, the event's move was welcomed by visitors attending, with a trader stating "it had outgrown Wrexham". Telford used to host a MCM Midlands Comic Con for over 10 years, until it was scrapped in November 2017.

The event on 25–26 April 2020 was moved to August 2020 due to the COVID-19 pandemic in the United Kingdom. It was later delayed again to 2021.

=== Return to Wrexham (2022) ===
On 26 June 2022, it was announced that the convention would host a one-day event in Wrexham, working with the university, Wrexham County Borough Council and the Welsh Government to liaise the return. The August event would be hosted alongside the Telford April and December events.

In July 2023, management of the convention confirmed the Wrexham event would return again and took place on 2–3 September 2023.

=== Leaving Telford (2023), hiatus and Llangollen ===
In December 2023, the event's organisers announced that it would no longer be held at the International Centre in Telford. No replacement venue was yet announced at the time.

In April 2024, the convention team announced they were setting up a new convention in Farnborough, Hampshire. They hoped to return for Wales Comic Con in Wrexham in the future.

In May 2025, organisers announced the event would return, after a year absence, to the Llangollen Pavilion, south-west of Wrexham, in Denbighshire, North Wales. The organisers had signed a "multi-year" deal for the event to be held in Llangollen. A return to Wrexham, alongside the Llangollen event, is to be considered in the future, although construction on their usual Wrexham site, Wrexham University's campus, has hampered the ability for the convention to hold large events. The first Llangollen event was held on 20–21 September 2025.

== Convention features ==
For many years, the convention was set up as follows:

=== Photographs and Autographs ===
Photograph sessions were held in either of the two main halls with a select few guests offering photographs on either day of the two-day event, costing £10–30 on the day. Autograph signing sessions were available in the main hall on both days, costing £10–25 for a signature each, and could be pre-ordered online as well as in-person. In 2019, Rupert Grint charged £125 each either a signature or photo, higher than many other guests attending.

=== Q&A panels ===
In 2016, Q&A panels were held on both days from 11.20 am to 5pm, in either the William Aston Hall (the event's "Hall A") or the Nick Whitehead Suite ("Hall B") at the university, and were included as part of an entry ticket.

2016 Hosts included; Andrew Pollard, CJ, Dr Rhys Jones, EileMonty, Leonard Sultana, Mark Newbold (partner event) and Tabitha Lyons. Celebrity guest hosts have previously included the likes of Chris Rankin from the Harry Potter franchise.

An evening event with David Tennant and Matt Smith was hosted at the 2019 event as a UK first of its kind.

Guests may talk about their shows and behind-the-scenes at these panels.

=== Aftershow Party ===
An aftershow party was held at The Centenary Club bar near the Racecourse Ground next to the university in 2016.

=== Gaming Zone ===
A gaming zone (or gaming arena) was set up to allow visitors to bring retro gaming consoles to share with other visitors, with some dating 2–3 decades old. The zone also includes the latest gadgetry and games, and it described as "always packed".

=== Cosplay ===
Cosplay is visible throughout the event, with parades, competitions and some photo opportunities available to those who participate in cosplay. Including a "Best Craftmanship" award at later events.

==== Cosplay Masquerade ====
A cosplay masquerade is held at some events, allowing visitors to have photographs taken with various cosplay artists and props portraying known cultural icons and franchises.

=== Stalls ===
Stalls displaying various licensed and video game memorabilia and merchandise, as well as collectables and artwork were set up for viewing and sale. Various video game, comic, art, action figure, photography, collectable, and gift traders participate in the event.

=== Robot combat (Wrexham 2022) ===
For the 2022 Wrexham event, a robot combat event would take place at the convention, based on Robot Wars.

== Location, dates and notable guests ==
Dates	Location	Notable guests (alphabetical order, by source) (Note: Some guests listed may only attend one-day at the two-day events.) (Note: Some sources used are limited archived webpages of the event's guest list, with many dates not aligned with the event day(s), leading to potential misses of last-minute cancellations/announcements of some guests.)
2008–2010	Yearly events at North East Wales Institute / Glyndŵr University	
5 June 2011	Glyndŵr University, Wrexham	Some guests included: Chris Barrie, Simon Furman, Larry Kenney, and Ray Stevenson.
23 September 2012	Glyndŵr University, Wrexham	As of 22 September 2012: Gethin Anthony, Chris Barrie, John Billingsley, Jeremy Bulloch, John Challis, James Cosmo, Gareth David-Lloyd, Warwick Davis, Craig Fairbrass, Jerome Flynn, Bonita Friedericy, Julian Glover, Anthony Head, Virginia Hey, Frazer Hines, David J. Howe, Finn Jones, Mark Lester, Robert Llewellyn, Thomas Ian Nicholas, Craig Parker, Andy Secombe, Marc Silk, Sam Stone, Billy West, Gemma Whelan, Spencer Wilding, Andrew Wildman, and Simon Williams. As well as other guests.
28 April 2013	Glyndŵr University, Wrexham	As of 15 May 2013: Mike Collins, Al Davison, Simon Furman, David J. Howe, Sam Stone, Andrew Wildman, Ted DiBiase, Tommy Dreamer, Carl Fogarty, Goldust, Neville Southall, Mark Addy, Chris Barrie, Carlos Bernard, Billy Boyd, Nicholas Brendon, Jed Brophy, Adam Brown, Craig Charles, Warwick Davis, Mick Foley, Danny John-Jules, Robert Llewellyn, Eoin Macken, Ian McElhinney, Robert Picardo, Chaske Spencer, and Gemma Whelan. As well as other guests.
27 April 2014	Glyndŵr University, Wrexham	As of April 2014: with some guests including Mark Addy, Charlie Adlard, Nicki Clyne, Colin Cunningham, Zach Galligan, Torri Higginson, Allison Mack, Graham McTavish, Jonathan Ross, and Rikishi. As well as other guests.
30 November 2014	Glyndŵr University, Wrexham	As of November 2014: Mike Carey, Al Ewing, David Howe, Staz Johnson, Andy Lanning, Jack Lawrence, Geoff Nelder, Sam Stone, Lee Townsend, Animal, Mark Addy, Scott Adkins, Jamie Anderson, Chris Barrie, Ian Beattie, Jeremy Bulloch, Steve Cardenas, Michael Carter, Brodus Clay, James Cosmo, Gareth David-Lloyd, Peter Davison, Jack Donnelly, Robert Emms, Lino Facioli, Simon Fisher-Becker, Alan Fletcher, Jerome Flynn, Lewis Macleod, Ian McNeice, Dominic Mitchell, Brian Muir, James Murray, Eve Myles, Luke Newberry, Sarah Parish, Andrew-Lee Potts, Duncan Pow, Shane Rangi, Chris Rankin, Shane Rimmer, Mason Ryan, Mark Sheppard, Lance Storm, Booker T, Owen Teale, David Warner, Ian Whyte, Spencer Wilding, Doug Williams, and Matthew Wood. As well as other guests.
26 April 2015	Glyndŵr University, Wrexham	As of 19 April 2015: Mike Collins, Tim Dry, Phil Jimenez, Sam Stone, Lee Townsend, Mark Addy, Dean Andrews, Chris Barrie, Michael J Bassett, Eric Bischoff, Nicholas Brendon, Scott Capurro, John Challis, Rob Van Dam, Warwick Davis, Jim Duggan, Mike Edmonds, Rusty Goffe, Kerry Ingram, Wolf Kahler, Maria Kanellis, Andy Kellegher, Sean Kelly, William Kircher, Matthew Leitch, Robert Llewellyn, Norman Lovett, Sean Maher, Amy Manson, Naoko Mori, Ross Mullan, Eve Myles, Shaun Parkes, Dave Prowse, Jemima Rooper, Matt Ryan, Emmett Scanlan, Mark Sheppard, Marc Silk, Hannah Spearritt, Clive Standen, Conan Stevens, Shane Taylor, and Garrett Wang. As well as other artists, writers, media guests and cosplay artists.
29 November 2015	Glyndŵr University, Wrexham	As of November 2015: Mike Collins, Gary Erskine, Lee Townsend, Andrew Wildman, Mark Addy, Melody Anderson, Nonso Anozie, Lindsay Armaou, Colin Baker, Ian Beattie, John Bell, Paul Blake, Jed Brophy, Adam Brown, Megan Burns, Doug Cockle, James Cosmo, Rick Cosnett, Gareth David-Lloyd, Kate Dickie, Ray Fearon, Ryan Gage, Scott Hall, Chris Jericho, Sam J. Jones, Mark Lutz, Sylvester McCoy, Ian McElhinney, Paul McGillion, Hugh Mitchell, Terry Molloy, Naoko Mori, Brian Muir, David Nykl, Ross O'Hennessy, Kai Owen, Shaun Parkes, Dave Benson Phillips, Andrew-Lee Potts, David Prowse, DJ Qualls, Chris Rankin, Kiran Shah, John Wesley Shipp, Marc Silk, Mark Stanley, Royd Tolkien, Alan Tomkins, Sean Waltman, Robert Watts, and Miltos Yerolemou. As well as other artists, writers and media guests.
23–24 April 2016	Wrexham Glyndŵr University, Wrexham	As of April 2016: Mark Addy, Roger Ashton-Griffiths, Mark Atkin, Chris Barrie, Amber Benson, Xander Berkeley, Emily Bevan, Esmé Bianco, Billy Boyd, John Challis, James Cosmo, Gareth David-Lloyd, Peter Davison, Jack Donnelly, Neil Fingleton, Jerome Flynn, Ian Gelder, Sue Holderness, Kerry Ingram, Robert Llewellyn, Norman Lovett, The Honky Tonk Man, Ben Mansfield, Amy Manson, Miriam Margolyes, James Marsters, Sylvester McCoy, Kevin McNally, Mark Meer, Rachel Miner, Hugh Mitchell, Jason Momoa, Hugo Myatt, Luke Newberry, Shaun Parkes, Andrew-Lee Potts, Chris Rankin, Jemma Redgrave, Chad Rook, Matt Ryan, Mark Ryan, Kiran Shah, Marc Silk, Michael Socha, Hannah Spearritt, Dan Starkey, Ricky Steamboat, Booker T, Veronica Taylor, Royd Tolkien, Oliver Walker, Paul Warren, Elizabeth Webster, Ian Whyte, Mike Collins and Gary Erskine. As well as some other artists and cosplay artists.
5–6 November 2016	Wrexham Glyndŵr University, Wrexham	As of 4 November 2016: Jimmy Akingbola, Paul Amos, Jennifer Blanc, David Bradley, Nicholas Brendon, Jed Brophy, Sadwyn Brophy, Gareth David-Lloyd, Billy Gunn, Ian Hanmore, Josh Herdman, Angus MacInnes, Allison Mack, Ian McElhinney, Kevin McNally, Naoko Mori, Mr Motivator, Kai Owen, Chris Rankin, Chris Sabat, Kristine Sutherland, Jim Tavaré, Royd Tolkien, Lizard Lick Towing, Tom Wlaschiha, and Miltos Yerolemou. As well as various artists, YouTubers, cosplay artists, and writers.
8–9 April 2017	Wrexham Glyndŵr University, Wrexham	As of 15 January 2017: Carlos Ezquerra, John Wagner, Erick Avari, Emma Caulfield, Amy Dumas, Gideon Emery, Brian Fortune, Malcolm Goodwin, Bobby Heenan, Tom Hopper, Nick Moran, Kevin Nash, David Prowse, John Rhys-Davies, Emmett J. Scanlan, Mark Silk, Alexander Vlahos, and Marc Warren. As well as some other guests and cosplay artists.
2–3 December 2017	Wrexham Glyndŵr University, Wrexham	As of 2 December 2017: Mark Addy, John Barnes, Brutus Beefcake, Shelley Blond, Richard Brake, Suanne Braun, Louise Brealey, Nicholas Brendon, Jed Brophy, John Challis, Chase Coleman, Michael Cudlitz, James Faulkner, Jason Flemyng, Dolya Gavanski, Chloé Hollings, Tom Hopper, Sam J Jones, Ross Marquand, Eddie McClintock, Kevin McNally, Eric Millegan, Corin Nemec, John Noble, Steven Ogg, Denis O’Hare, Kai Owen, Tahmoh Penikett, Sean Pertwee, Mitch Pileggi, Andrew Lee Potts, Robert Pugh, Chris Rankin, Carolina Ravassa, Matt Ryan, Tolga Safer, Andrew Scott, Hannah Spearritt, Ken Stott, Kristine Sutherland, Tamara Taylor, TJ Thyne, Royd Tolkien, SoCal Val, Laura Vandervoort, Scott Wilson, Sting, and Virgil. As well as other guests.
21–22 April 2018	Wrexham Glyndŵr University, Wrexham	As of 22 April 2018: Mark Addy, Tony Amendola, David Anders, Hayley Atwell, Eion Bailey, Marc Blucas, Alex Breckenridge, Frank Bruno, Christian Cage, Rick Cosnett, Gareth David-Lloyd, Warwick Davis, Andrew Divoff, Brea Grant, Taylor Gray, Greg Grunberg, Anthony Head, Amy Jo Johnson, Richard Karn, Clare Kramer, Juliet Landau, James Mackenzie, Tyler Mane, David Mazouz, Sylvester McCoy, Paul McGann, Frankie Muniz, Diamond Dallas Page, Craig Parker, Sean Pertwee, Lucie Pohl, Chris Rankin, John Rhys-Davies, Erin Richards, Michael Rowe, Matt Ryan, Andrew Scott, Kiran Shah, Mark Sheppard, Marc Silk, Eric Stuart, Veronica Taylor, Cara Theobold, George Wendt, Ian Whyte, Miltos Yerolemou, and Billy Zane. As well as some other guests and cosplay artists.
1–2 December 2018	Wrexham Glyndŵr University, Wrexham	As of 30 September 2018: Paul Amos, Ivana Baquero, Jim Beaver, Sean Biggerstaff, David Bradley, Kim Coates, Natalia Cordova-Buckley, James Cosmo, Tony Curran, Arthur Darvill, Howie Dorough, Gary Erskine, Tommy Flanagan, Mick Foley, David Giuntoli, Guy Henry, Brian Herring, Russell Hodgkinson, Kris Holden-Ried, Derek Jacobi, Austin St. John, Stefan Kapičić, Robert Kazinsky, Pom Klementieff, C. S. Lee, Amy Manson, Ian McElhinney, Paul McGann, AJ McLean, Jennifer Morrison, Kevin Nash, Ken Page, Zoie Palmer, Ray Park, Ron Perlman, James Purefoy, Theo Rossi, Abubakar Salim, Chris Sarandon, Sheamus, Mark Sheppard, Henry Simmons, Trish Stratus, Joonas Suotamo, Michelle Trachtenberg, Karl Urban, Cesaro, David Zayas, and Dolph Ziggler. As well as other artists and cosplay artists.
27–28 April 2019	Wrexham Glyndŵr University, Wrexham	As of 23 April 2019: Mark Addy, Paul Amos, Richard Dean Anderson, Benz Antoine, Hayley Atwell, Dante Basco, Tyler Bate, Camren Bicondova, Nick Blood, Robert Buckley, Sam Claflin, Charlie Cox, Michael Cudlitz, Liam Cunningham, Lucy Davis, Pete Dunne, Carlos Ferro, Michelle Gomez, Rupert Grint, Laurie Holden, John Howe, Paul Johansson, Danny John-Jules, Jack Lawrence, Alexander Ludwig, Michael Madsen, Mark Meer, Justin H. Min, Jennifer Morrison, Eve Myles, Sam Neill, Miranda Otto, Ron Perlman, Sean Pertwee, Billie Piper, Lucie Pohl, Emmy Raver-Lampman, Monica Rial, Erin Richards, Jordan Claire Robbins, Jamie Roberts, Matt Ryan, Keith Silverstein, Kiefer Sutherland, Amanda Tapping, Robin Lord Taylor, David Tennant, Russell Tovey, David Wenham, and Nathan Wyburn. As well as other guests in the arts, creative writing, cosplay, and voice acting sectors.
7–8 December 2019	The International Centre, Telford	The first event to be held in Telford. Including: Steve Cardenas, Emma Caulfield, Arthur Darvill, Gareth David-Lloyd, Erica Durance, Sean Gunn, Isaac Hempstead-Wright, Tyler Hoechlin, Phil Jimenez, Christopher Judge, Alex Kingston, Zachary Levi, Matthew Lewis, Charles Martinet, Josh McDermitt, Kel Mitchell, David Morrissey, Kristian Nairn, Jason Narvy, Corin Nemec, Michael Rooker, Michael Rosenbaum, Brandon Routh, Matt Ryan, Paul Schrier, Mark Sheppard, Matt Smith, Catherine Tate, Veronica Taylor, David Tennant, Laura Vandervoort, and Tom Welling.
25–26 April 2020	Cancelled/postponed due to the COVID-19 pandemic in the United Kingdom.	
22–23 August 2020	Cancelled/postponed due to the COVID-19 pandemic in the United Kingdom.	
24–25 April 2021	Cancelled/postponed due to the COVID-19 pandemic in the United Kingdom.	
20–21 November 2021	The International Centre, Telford	As of 20 November 2021: Chris Achilleos, Roger Clark, Mark Addy, Paul Amos, Sean Astin, Victoria Atkin, Troy Baker, Colin Baker, Britt Baker, John Barrowman, Paul Blackthorne, Caroline Blakiston, Shelley Blond, Jungle Boy, Billy Boyd, Magnus Bruun, Steve Cardenas, Charisma Carpenter, Michelle Collins, Holly Marie Combs, Rick Cosnett, Gareth David-Lloyd, Peter Davison, John DiMaggio, Barbara Dunkelman, Gary Erskine, Joe Flanigan, Dolya Gavanski, Ian Gelder, Garrick Hagon, Bret Hart, Brian Herring, Danny John-Jules, Lindsay Jones, Julian Lewis Jones, Brian Krause, Juliet Landau, Denis Lawson, Sonia Leong, Luchasaurus, Angus MacInnes, Joseph Marcell, James Marsters, Alanna Masterson, Sylvester McCoy, Ian McDiarmid, Mary McDonnell, Paul McGann, Liam McIntyre, Mark Meer, Will Mellor, Hugh Mitchell, Naoko Mori, John Morton, Devon Murray, David Nykl, James O'Barr, Steven Ogg, Edward James Olmos, Kenny Omega, Kai Owen, Melina Perez, Billie Piper, Mike Quinn, Patricia Quinn, John Rhys-Davies, Holland Roden, Emmett J. Scanlan, Carolyn Seymour, Michael Shanks, Mark Sheppard, Lester Speight, Clive Standen, Nick E. Tarabay, Veronica Taylor, Cara Theobold, Robert Watts, Ian Whyte, Rob Wiethoff, Mark Williams, and Nathan Wyburn. As well as other guests in the arts and technology sectors.
2–3 April 2022	The International Centre, Telford	As of 24 January 2022: Sala Baker, Julie Benz, Brian Blessed, David Bradley, Jed Brophy, Bruce Campbell, Blake Clark, Kenneth Colley, Ruth Connell, Kevin Conroy, Michael Culver, Brad Dourif, Gary Erskine, Peter Facinelli, Will Friedle, Summer Glau, Julian Glover, Jay Goede, Staz Johnson, Sam J. Jones, Evangeline Lilly, James Marsters, John McCrea, Stephen Moyer, Miranda Otto, Anna Paquin, Craig Parker, Karyn Parsons, Michael Pennington, Mike Perkins, Ray Porter, Tim Reid, Daphne Maxwell Reid, Christina Ricci, Andy Serkis, Mark Sheppard, David Tennant, Phil Winslade, and Sting. As well as other guests in the arts and technology sectors.
21 August 2022	Wrexham Glyndŵr University, Wrexham	As of August 2022: Chris Barrie, Paul Blackthorne, Brian Blessed, Jessica Darrow, Peter Davison, Grace Van Dien, Diane Youdale (Jet), Mark Lewis Jones, Stefan Kapičić, Patricia Quinn, Matt Ryan, Marc Silk, Alec Utgoff, and Alexander Vlahos. As well as other guests in the arts and technology sectors.
3–4 December 2022	The International Centre, Telford	As of 12 August 2022: Sophie Aldred, Kurt Angle, Felicia Day, Steve Downes, Christopher Eccleston, Gary Erskine, Bill Farmer, Janet Fielding, Johnny Gargano, The Godfather, Jack Lawrence, Matt Lintz, Donal Logue, Jason Marsden, Will Mellor, Anson Mount, Eve Myles, James O'Barr, François Petit, Jemma Redgrave, William Regal, Mark Rowley, Mark Sheppard, TomSka, Danny Trejo, Curran Walters, Grey DeLisle and Victoria Yeates. As well as other guests in the arts and technology sectors.
13–14 May 2023	The International Centre, Telford	As of 7 April 2023: Mark Addy, Sean Astin, Sala Baker, Chris Barrie, Jennifer Blanc, Michael Biehn, Brian Blessed, David Bradley, Kit Buss, Cam Clarke, Townsend Coleman, Holly Marie Combs, Shannen Doherty, Gary Erskine, Nathan Fillion, Stephen Garlick, Daniel Gillies, Barry Gordon, Josh Herdman, Bernard Hill, Bruce Hopkins, Clare Kramer, Brian Krause, Kristin Kreuk, Jack Lawrence, Sonia Leong, Tabitha Lyons, Sean Maher, Lisa Maxwell, Sylvester McCoy, Paul McGann, Rose McGowan, Will Mellor, Dave B. Mitchell, Chad Michael Murray, Doug Naylor, Nigel Parkinson, Rob Paulsen, Grant Perkins, James Phelps, Oliver Phelps, Michael Rosenbaum, Matt Ryan, Ken Shamrock, Mark Sheppard, Jordan Patrick Smith, Jewel Staite, Tara Strong, Tomska and Bonnie Wright.
2–3 September 2023	Wrexham University	As of 1 September 2023: Amanda Abbington, Mark Addy, James Cosmo, Gareth David-Lloyd, Michael Jayston, Terence Maynard, Sylvester McCoy, Patricia Quinn, Steve Speirs, Dan Starkey, Catrin Stewart, Femi Taylor and TJ Thyne.
18–19 November 2023	The International Centre, Telford	As of 25 September 2023: Kirk Acevedo, Colin Baker, David Bradley, Kit Buss, Néstor Carbonell, Osric Chau, Warwick Davis, Peter Davison, Neil Edwards, Paul Freeman, Seth Gilliam, Julian Glover, Ryan Hurst, Alex Kingston, Jack Lawrence, Jay Manchand, Sylvester McCoy, Paul McGann, Graham McTavish, Thomas Nicholas, John Noble, Nigel Parkinson, Grant Perkins, Gavin Rodrigues, Jack Ryder, Veronica Taylor, Henry Thomas, John Wagner, Tom Wlaschiha and Stanislav Yanevski. As of 19 November 2023 additionally: Jamie Campbell Bower, Jenna Coleman and Giancarlo Esposito.
April 2024	Wrexham University	Mathew Horne, Mark Addy, Patrick Fabian, Samuel Anderson, Lucy Griffiths, Emmett J. Scanlan, Paul McGann, Daphne Ashbrook, Janet Fielding, Brian Herring, Neil Roberts, Josh Herdman, Mike Quinn (puppeteer) and Francois Petit.
September 2025	Llangollen Pavilion	

== See also ==
- List of comic book conventions
- Comic book convention
- List of multigenre conventions
