= List of Avengers titles =

The Avengers is a team of comic book superheroes in the Marvel Comics universe. Since 1963, they have starred in several ongoing series, as well as a large number of limited series and specials. All stories are published exclusively by Marvel Comics under their standard imprint, unless otherwise noted.

== Primary series ==
- Avengers #1-402 (September 1963 – September 1996)
  - Avengers Annual #1-23 (1967–1969, 1971–1972, 1976–1979, 1981–1994)
  - Giant-Size Avengers #1-5 (August 1974 – December 1975)
- Avengers vol. 2 #1-13 [#403-415] (Marvel Comics/Extreme Studios/Wildstorm; November 1996 – November 1997)
- Avengers vol. 3 #1-84 [#416-499]; #500-503 (February 1998 – December 2004)
  - Avengers #0 (Marvel Comics/Wizard Entertainment; July 1999)
  - Avengers/Squadron Supreme Annual '98 (1998)
  - Avengers Annual '99 (1999)
  - Avengers Annual 2000 (2000)
  - Avengers Annual 2001 (2001)
  - Avengers Finale #1 (January 2005)
- New Avengers #1-64 [#504-567] (January 2005 – April 2010)
  - New Avengers Annual #1-3 (2006–2009)
  - New Avengers Finale (2010)
- Avengers vol. 4 #1-34 [#568-601] (May 2010 – November 2012)
  - Avengers Annual #1 (2012)
- Avengers vol. 5 #1-44 [#602-645] (December 2012 – June 2015)
  - Avengers Annual #1 (2013)
- Avengers vol 6 #0 (2015)
- All-New All-Different Avengers #1-15 [#646-660] (October 2015 – September 2016)
  - All-New All-Different Avengers Annual #1 (2016)
- Avengers vol. 7 #1-11 [#661-671]; #672-690 (November 2016 - April 2018)
- Avengers vol. 8 #1-66 [#691-766] (2018 - 2023)
  - Avengers Annual #1 (2021)
- Avengers Forever vol. 2 #1-15 (2022-2023)
- Avengers vol. 9 #1-36 [#767-802] (May 2023 - March 2026)
- Avengers: Armageddon #1-5 [#803-807] (June 2026 - October 2026)
- Avengers vol. 10 #1- [#808-] (November 2026 - present)

== Spin-off series ==
- West Coast Avengers #1-4 (September–December 1984)
  - West Coast Avengers vol. 2 #1-46 (October 1985 – July 1989)
  - West Coast Avengers Annual #1-3 (1986–1988)
  - Avengers West Coast #47-102 (August 1989 – January 1994)
  - Avengers West Coast Annual #4-8 (1989–1993)
  - West Coast Avengers vol. 3 #1-10 (August 2018 - April 2019)
  - West Coast Avengers vol. 4 #1-#10 (November 2024 – August 2025)
- Solo Avengers #1-20 (December 1987 – July 1989)
  - Avengers Spotlight #21-40 (August 1989 – January 1991)
- Force Works #1-22 (July 1994 – April 1996)
- Avengers Unplugged #1-6 (October 1995 – August 1996)
- The Avengers: United They Stand #1-7 (November 1999 – June 2000)
- Young Avengers #1-12 (April 2005 – January 2007)
  - Young Avengers Special #1 (February 2006)
  - Young Avengers vol. 2 #1-15 (January 2013 - January 2014)
- Marvel Adventures: The Avengers #1-39 (July 2006 – August 2009)
- Avengers: The Initiative #1-35 (April 2007 – June 2010)
  - Avengers: The Initiative Annual #1 (January 2008)
  - Avengers: The Initiative Special #1 (January 2009)
- Mighty Avengers #1-36 (May 2007 – April 2010)
  - Mighty Avengers vol. 2 #1-14 (November 2013 - November 2014)
  - Captain America and the Mighty Avengers #1-9 (January - August 2015)
- Dark Avengers #1-16 (January 2009 – April 2010)
  - Dark Avengers #175-190 (June 2012 - May 2013)
- Secret Avengers #1-37 (May 2010 – January 2013)
  - Secret Avengers vol. 2 #1-16 (February 2013 – February 2014)
  - Secret Avengers vol. 3 #1-15 (March 2014 - June 2015)
- Avengers Academy #1-40 (June 2010 – November 2012)
  - Avengers Academy Giant Size #1 (July 2011)
- New Avengers vol. 2 #1-34 (June 2010 – November 2012)
  - New Avengers Annual #1 (2011)
  - New Avengers vol. 3 #1-33 (January 2013 – June 2015)
    - New Avengers Annual #1 (2014)
  - New Avengers vol. 4 #1-18 (October 2015 – November 2016)
  - New Avengers vol. 5 #1-present (June 2025 – Present)
- Avengers Assemble #1-25 (March 2012 – March 2014)
- Uncanny Avengers #1-25 (October 2012 – December 2014)
  - Uncanny Avengers Annual #1 (April 2014)
  - Uncanny Avengers vol. 2 #1-5 (March 2015 - August 2015)
  - Uncanny Avengers vol. 3 #1-30 (October 2015 – January 2018)
    - Uncanny Avengers Annual #1 (January 2016)
  - Uncanny Avengers vol. 4 #1-5 (August – December 2023)
- A+X #1-18 (October 2012 – March 2014)
- Avengers Arena #1-18 (December 2012 – November 2013)
- Avengers A.I. #1-12 (July 2013 - June 2014)
- Avengers World #1-21 (January 2014 - July 2015)
- Avengers Undercover #1-10 (March 2014 - November 2014)
- A-Force #1-5 (May 2015 - October 2015)
  - A-Force vol. 2 #1-10 (January 2016 – October 2016)
- Ultimates Vol. 2 (January 2016 - December 2016)
  - Ultimates 2 Vol. 2 (January 2017 - August 2017)
- Occupy Avengers #1-9 (November 2016 – September 2017)
- Great Lakes Avengers Vol. 2 #1-7 (December 2016 - June 2017)
- U.S.Avengers #1-12 (March 2017 - January 2018)
- Savage Avengers #1-28 (May 2019 - January 2022)
- Avengers Forever vol. 2 #1-15 (2022-2023)

== Limited series and specials ==
Specials and limited series which are part of an ongoing story in the primary series, or became ongoing series, are included above.

=== Limited series ===
- X-Men vs. the Avengers #1-4 (April–July 1987)
- Avengers: The Terminatrix Objective #1-4 (September–December 1993)
- The Last Avengers Story #1-2 (November–December 1995)
- Domination Factor: Avengers #1.2, 2.4, 3.6, 4.8 (November 1999 – February 2000)
  - Domination Factor: Fantastic Four #1.1, 2.3, 3.5, 4.7
- Avengers Forever #1-12 (December 1998 – February 2000)
- Avengers Two: Wonder Man and Beast #1-3 (May–July 2000)
- Avengers Infinity #1-4 (September–December 2000)
- Avengers: Celestial Quest #1-8 (November 2001 – June 2002)
- Avengers Icons: Tigra #1-4 (May–August 2002)
- Avengers Icons: The Vision #1-4 (October 2002 – January 2003)
- JLA/Avengers #1, 3 (Marvel Comics/DC Comics; September 2003, December 2003)
  - Avengers/JLA #2, 4 (DC Comics/Marvel Comics; October 2003, March 2004)
- Avengers/Thunderbolts #1-6 (May–September 2004)
- Avengers: Earth's Mightiest Heroes #1-8 (November 2004 – March 2005)
  - Avengers: Earth's Mightiest Heroes II #1-8 (January–May 2007)
- Avengers and Power Pack Assemble! #1-4 (June–September 2006)
- New Avengers: Illuminati vol. 2 #1-5 (February 2007 – January 2008)
- New Avengers/Transformers #1-4 (Marvel Comics/IDW Publishing; July–October 2007)
- Avengers/Invaders #1-12 (July 2008 – August 2009)
- New Avengers: The Reunion #1-4 (May–August 2009)
- Lockjaw and the Pet Avengers #1-4 (July–October 2009)
  - Lockjaw and the Pet Avengers: Unleashed #1-4 (May–August 2010)
  - Avengers vs. Pet Avengers #1-4 (December 2010 – March 2011)
- New Avengers: Luke Cage #1-3 (April–June 2010)
- I Am an Avenger #1-5 (May 2010 – March 2011)
- Avengers: The Origin #1-5 (June–October 2010)
- Avengers Prime #1-5 (August 2010 – March 2011)
- Avengers: The Children's Crusade #1-9 (September 2010 – March 2012)
- Chaos War: Dead Avengers #1-3 (January–March 2011)
- Avengers 1959 #1-5 (December 2011 – March 2012)
- Avengers: X-Sanction #1-4 (February–May 2012)
- Avengers vs. X-Men #0-12 (May–December 2012)
- Avengers & X-Men: AXIS #1-9 (December 2014 - February 2015)
- Avengers Millennium #1-4 (June 2015)

=== One-shots and original graphic novels ===
- Avengers: Emperor Doom (1987, Marvel Graphic Novel #27)
- Avengers: Deathtrap - The Vault (1991)
- Avengers Collector's Edition (1993). Presented by Sugar Daddy, Sugar Babies, and Charleston Chew.
- Avengers Strikefile (January 1994)
- Avengers Log (February 1994)
- Avengers: The Crossing #1 (September 1995)
- Hot Shots: Avengers (October 1995)
- Ultraforce/Avengers Prelude (Ultraverse/Marvel Comics; August 1995)
  - Ultraforce/Avengers #1 (Ultraverse/Marvel Comics; August 1995)
  - Avengers/Ultraforce #1 (Marvel Comics/Ultraverse; October 1995)
- Avengers: Timeslide #1 (February 1996)
- Avengers: Rough Cut #1 (August 1998)
- Timeslip Special: The Coming of the Avengers (October 1998)
- Avengers #1½ (December 1999)
- Avengers Casebook #1 (February 2000)
- Avengers: The Ultron Imperitave #1 (November 2001)
- What If Jessica Jones Had Joined the Avengers? (December 2004)
- The Official Handbook of the Marvel Universe: Avengers 2004 (2004)
- The Official Handbook of the Marvel Universe: Avengers 2005 (2005)
- New Avengers: Illuminati #1 (2006)
- New Avengers: Most Wanted Files (2006)
- Giant-Size Avengers vol. 2 #1 (February 2008)
- Avengers Assemble #1 (July 2010)
- Avengers Origins: Ant-Man & The Wasp #1 (January 2012)
- Avengers Origins: Luke Cage #1 (January 2012)
- Avengers Origins: Scarlet Witch & Quicksilver #1 (January 2012)
- Avengers Origins: Thor #1 (January 2012)
- Avengers Origins: Vision #1 (January 2012)
- Avengers: Endless Wartime (2013)
- Avengers: Rage of Ultron (2015)
- Avengers vs. #1 (July 2015)
- Avengers: Ultron Forever (Part 1) #1 (2015)
- New Avengers: Ultron Forever (Part 2) #1 (2015)
- Uncanny Avengers: Ultron Forever (Part 3) #1 (2015)
- Avengers: Operation Hydra #1 (June 2015)
- Avengers Free Comic Book Day #1 (June 2015)
- Avengers: It All Begins Here #0 (December 2015)
- Avengers vs. Infinity #1 (January 2016)
- Avengers Standoff Welcome to Pleasant Hill #1 (April 2016)
- Avengers Standoff Assault on Pleasant Hill Alpha #1 (May 2016)
- Avengers Standoff Assault on Pleasant Hill Omega #1 (June 2016)

== Reprint series ==
- Marvel Triple Action #5-47 (September 1972 – April 1979)
- Marvel Super Action #14-37 (December 1979 – November 1981)
- Kree/Skrull War Starring the Avengers #1-2 (September–October 1983)
- Avengers Universe #1-6 (July 2000 – February 2001)
- Avengers United #1-100 (June 2001 – December 2008)
- Avengers Classic #1-12 (June 2007 – April 2008)
- Avengers Unconquered #1-current (January 2009 – present)

== Collected editions ==
All collections are in standard-size, colour, trade paperback format unless otherwise stated.

Title	Material collected	Year	ISBN
Avengers Celestial Quest	Avengers Celestial Quest 1-8	2012	978-0785162339
Avengers: Citizen Kang	Captain America Annual #11, Thor Annual #17, Fantastic Four Annual #25, Avengers Annual #21	2011	978-0785153016
Avengers: Earth's Mightiest Heroes Ultimate Collection	Avengers: Earth's Mightiest Heroes 1-8, Avengers: Earth's Mightiest Heroes II 1-8	2012	978-0785159377
Avengers Forever (hardcover)	Avengers Forever #1-12	2009	978-0785137962
Avengers Forever (softcover)	Avengers Forever #1-12	2001	0785107568
Avengers Infinity Classic	Avengers Infinity 1-4	2013	978-0785166788
Avengers Masterworks	The Avengers #1-5	1993	0871359839
Avengers Omnibus Vol. 1 (hardcover)	The Avengers #1-30	2012	978-0785158462
Avengers Visionaries: The Art of George Pérez	The Avengers 161–162, 194–196, 201, Annual #6, 8	1999	0785107177
Avengers/Invaders (hardcover)	Avengers/Invaders #1-12; Avengers/Invaders Sketchbook	2009	0785129421
Avengers/Invaders (softcover)	Avengers/Invaders #1-12; Avengers/Invaders Sketchbook	2009	978-0785129431
Avengers: The Big Three	Captain America #176; Avengers #150-151, #215-216, #224; Avengers: The Terminatrix Objective #1-4; Avengers vol.3 #21; Thor vol. 2 #81	2012	978-0785159384
Avengers: The Crossing	Avengers #390-395; The Crossing; Timeslide; Iron Man (1968) #319-325; Force Works #16-22; War Machine #20-25; Age of Innocence: The Rebirth of Iron Man	2012	978-0785162032
Avengers: The Many Faces of Henry Pym	Tale of Suspense 27, 35, 49; Avengers 28, 59-60; West Coast Avengers 21; Avengers Annual 2001; Secret Invasion: Requiem	2012	978-0785162063
Avengers: The Origin	Avengers: The Origin #1-5	2012	978-0785144007
Avengers/Thunderbolts, Vol. 1: The Nefaria Protocols	The Avengers vol. 3 #31-34; Thunderbolts #42-44	2004	978-0785114451
Avengers/Thunderbolts, Vol. 2: Best Intentions	Avengers/Thunderbolts #1-6	2004	078511422X
Avengers/X-Men: Bloodties (hardcover)	The Avengers #368-369; Avengers West Coast #101; Uncanny X-Men #307; X-Men #26; Black Knight: Exodus One-Shot	2012	978-0785161271
Avengers/X-Men: Bloodties (softcover)	The Avengers #368-369; Avengers West Coast #101; Uncanny X-Men #307; X-Men #26	1995	0785101039
Avengers: Ultron Unleashed	The Avengers #57-58, 170-171	1999	
Avengers: Vision and the Scarlet Witch	The Vision and the Scarlet Witch #1-4; Giant-Size Avengers #4	2005 (reprinted 2015)	0785117709
Avengers: Vision & The Scarlet Witch - A Year In the Life	The Vision & the Scarlet Witch v2 #1-12; West Coast Avengers v2 #2	2010	978-0785145080
Giant-Size Avengers Special #1	The Avengers #58, 201	2007	
JLA/Avengers: The Collector's Edition (hardcover)	JLA/Avengers #1, 3; Avengers/JLA #2, 4	2004	1401202071
JLA/Avengers: The Collector's Edition (softcover)	JLA/Avengers #1, 3; Avengers/JLA #2, 4	2008	978-1401219574
The Greatest Battles of the Avengers	The Avengers #54-55, 79, 160, Annual #7, 10	1993	0871359812
The Last Avengers Story	Last Avengers #1-2	1996	0785102183
The X-Men vs. the Avengers	The X-Men vs. the Avengers #1-4; Uncanny X-Men #9	2010	978-0785138099
X-Statix, Vol. 4: X-Statix vs. the Avengers	X-Statix #19-26	2004	978-0785115373
Young Avengers, Vol. 1: Sidekicks (hardcover)	Young Avengers #1-6	2005	978-0785114703
Young Avengers, Vol. 1: Sidekicks (softcover)	Young Avengers #1-6	2006	978-0785120186
Young Avengers, Vol. 2: Family Matters (hardcover)	Young Avengers #7-12; Young Avengers Special #1	2006	978-0785120216
Young Avengers, Vol. 2: Family Matters (softcover)	Young Avengers #7-12; Young Avengers Special #1	2007	978-0785117544
Avengers: The Children's Crusade	Avengers: The Children's Crusade #1-9, Uncanny X-Men #526	2012	978-0785135494
Avengers & X-Men: Axis	Avengers & X-Men: Axis #1-9	2015	978-0785190950

=== Essential Avengers ===
Title	Material collected	Year	ISBN
Essential Avengers, Vol. 1	Avengers #1-24	1998	978-0785118626
Essential Avengers, Vol. 2	Avengers #25-46; King-Size Special #1	2000	978-0785107415
Essential Avengers, Vol. 3	Avengers #47-68, Annual #2	2001	978-0785107873
Essential Avengers, Vol. 4	Avengers #69-97, Incredible Hulk #140	2004	978-0785114857
Essential Avengers, Vol. 5	Avengers #98-119; Daredevil #99; Defenders #8-11	2006	978-0785120872
Essential Avengers, Vol. 6	Avengers #120-140; Giant-Size #1-4; Captain Marvel #33; Fantastic Four #150	2008	978-0785130581
Essential Avengers, Vol. 7	Avengers #141-163, Annual #6; Super-Villain Team-Up #9	2010	978-0785144533
Essential Avengers, Vol. 8	Avengers #164-184, Annual #7-8, Marvel Two-In-One Annual #2	2012	978-0785163220
Essential Avengers, Vol. 9	Avengers #185-206, Annual #9, material from Tales to Astonish Vol. 2 #12	2013	978-0785184119

=== Marvel Masterworks: Avengers (hardcover) ===
Title	Material collected	Year	ISBN
Vol. 1	The Avengers #1-10	2003	978-0785108832
Vol. 2	The Avengers #11-20	2003	978-0785111788
Vol. 3	The Avengers #21-30	2004	978-0785111795
Vol. 4	The Avengers #31-40	2004	978-0785116387
Vol. 5	The Avengers #41-50; The Avengers King-Size Special #1	2005	978-0785118480
Vol. 6	The Avengers #51-58; The Avengers King-Size Special #2; Uncanny X-Men #45	2003	978-0785120797
Vol. 7	The Avengers #59-68; Marvel Super-Heroes #17	2003	978-0785126805
Vol. 8	The Avengers #69-79	2009	978-0785129349
Vol. 9	The Avengers #80-88; The Incredible Hulk vol. 2 #140	2009	978-0785135012
Vol. 10	The Avengers #89-100	2010	978-0785133315
Vol. 11	The Avengers #101-111; Daredevil #99	2011	978-0785150381
Vol. 12	The Avengers #112-119; Defenders #8-11	2011	978-0785158790
Vol. 13	The Avengers #120-128; Giant-Size Avengers #1; Captain Marvel #33; Fantastic Four #150	2013	978-0785166290
Vol. 14	The Avengers #129-135; Giant-Size Avengers #2-4	2014	978-0785188056
Vol. 15	The Avengers #136-149	2015	978-0785191964
Vol. 16	The Avengers #150-163; The Avengers Annual #6; Super-Villain Team-Up #9	2016	978-0785195429
Vol. 17	The Avengers #164-177; The Avengers Annual #7	2017	978-1302903411
Vol. 18	The Avengers #178-188; The Avengers Annual#8-9; Marvel Premiere #49; material from Marvel Tales #100	2018	978-1-302-90960-4
Vol.19	The Avengers #189-202; Marvel Premiere #55; Tales to Astonish #12	2019	978-1-302-91662-6
Vol. 20	The Avengers #203-216; The Avengers Annual #10; material from Marvel Super Action #35-37	2020	978-1-302-92224-5
Vol. 21	The Avengers #217-226; The Avengers Annual #11; Vision and the Scarlet Witch #1-4; material from Marvel Fanfare #3	2021	978-1-302-92935-0
Vol. 22	The Avengers #227-235; The Avengers Annual #12; Amazing Spider-Man Annual #16; Fantastic Four #256; Doctor Strange #60	2022	978-1-302-93328-9
Vol. 23	The Avengers #236-245; Annual #13; Hawkeye #1-4.	2023	978-1-302-94930-3
Vol. 24	The Avengers #246-254; Avengers West Coast #1-4; Iron Man Annual #7	2024	978-1-302-95532-8
Vol. 25	The Avengers #255-263; Annual #14; Marvel Graphic Novel #27; Fantastic Four #286	2025	978-1-302-96231-9

=== The Avengers Epic Collection ===
Volume	Subtitle	Years covered	Issues collected	Pages	Publication date	ISBN
1	Earth's Mightiest Heroes	1963-1965	Avengers #1–20	456	November 12, 2014	978-0-7851-8864-3
2	Once an Avenger...	1965-1967	Avengers #21–40	440	November 16, 2016	978-0-7851-9582-5
3	The Masters of Evil	1967-1968	Avengers #41–56, Annual #1–2, X-Men #45; and material from Not Brand Echh #5 & #8	496	April 26, 2017	978-1-302-90410-4
4	Behold...the Vision	1968-1970	Avengers #57–76; Marvel Super Heroes #17	456	April 29, 2015	978-0-7851-9165-0
5	This Beachhead Earth	1970-1972	Avengers #77–97; Incredible Hulk (vol. 2) #140	504	July 29, 2020 August 22, 2023	978-1-302-92197-2, 978-1-302-95052-1
6	A Traitor Stalks Among Us	1972-1973	Avengers #98–114; Daredevil #99	400	June 1, 2021	978-1-302-92911-4
7	The Avengers/Defenders War	1973-1974	Avengers #115–128; Giant-Size Avengers #1; Defenders #9–11; Captain Marvel #33; Fantastic Four #150; and material from Defenders #8	456	April 11, 2018 April 12, 2022	978-1-302-91000-6, 978-1-302-93402-6
8	Kang War	1974-1976	Avengers #129-149, Giant-Size Avengers #2-4	504	July 19, 2022	978-1-302-93352-4
9	The Final Threat	1976-1977	Avengers #150–166, Annual #6–7; Super-Villain Team-Up #9; Marvel Two-in-One Annual #2	440	December 11, 2013 May 26, 2021	978-0-7851-8790-5, 978-1-302-92959-6
10	The Yesterday Quest	1978-1979	Avengers #167–188, Annual #8–9; and material from Marvel Tales #100	496	September 26, 2023	978-1-302-94876-4
11	The Evil Reborn	1979-1980	Avengers #189-209, Annual #10; and material from Tales to Astonish #12		May 2024	
16	Under Siege	1986-1987	Avengers #264–277, Annual #15; West Coast Avengers Annual #1; Alpha Flight #39	456	May 31, 2016	978-0-7851-9539-9
17	Judgment Day	1987	Avengers #278–285, Annual #16; Marvel Graphic Novel No. 27 - Emperor Doom; X-Men vs. Avengers #1–4; West Coast Avengers Annual #2	464	June 18, 2014 January 4, 2022	978-0-7851-8894-0, 978-1-302-93366-1
18	Heavy Metal	1987-1989	Avengers #286-303, Annual #17	512	November 24, 2020	978-1-302-92315-0
19	Acts of Vengeance	1989-1990	Avengers #304-318, Annual #18, Avengers West Coast #53-55	496	March 28, 2023	978-1-302-95110-8
20	The Crossing Line	1990-1991	Avengers #319-333, Annual #19 and material from Captain America Annual #9, Iron Man Annual #11, Thor Annual #15 and Avengers West Coast Annual #5	520	March 1, 2022	978-1-302-93444-6
21	The Collection Obsession	1991-1992	Avengers #334–344, Annual #20, Marvel Graphic Novel No. 68 - Avengers: Death Trap – The Vault and material from Incredible Hulk Annual #17, Namor the Sub-Mariner Annual #1, Iron Man Annual #12 and Avengers West Coast Annual #6	496	March 14, 2018 September 20, 2022	978-1-302-91001-3
22	Operation: Galactic Storm	1992	Avengers #345–347, Avengers West Coast #80–82, Quasar #32–34, Wonder Man #7–9, Iron Man #278–279, Thor #445–446, Captain America #401 and material from Captain America #398–400	488	July 26, 2017 May 10, 2022	978-1-302-90689-4, 978-1-302-94686-9
23	Fear the Reaper	1992-1993	Avengers #348–359, Annual #21 and material from Captain America Annual #11, Thor Annual #17 and Fantastic Four Annual #25	480	April 10, 2019	978-1-302-91616-9
24	The Gatherers Strike!	1993-1994	Avengers #360–366, Annual #22; Avengers: Strikefile; Avengers Anniversary Magazine; Avengers: The Terminatrix Objective #1–4	480	December 11, 2019	978-1-302-92063-0
25	The Gathering	1993-1994	Avengers #367-377, Annual #23; X-Men #26; Avengers West Coast #101; Uncanny X-Men #307; Avengers Log #1	512	August 22, 2023	978-1-302-95367-6
26	Taking A.I.M.	1994-1995	Avengers #378–388; Marvel Double Feature: Avengers/Giant-Man #379-382; Vision #1-4; Captain America #440–441	504	November 9, 2021	978-1-302-93233-6

=== The Avengers ===
Title	Material collected	Year	ISBN
Kang: Time and Time Again	Avengers #69-71, 267-269; Thor #140; Hulk #135	2005	978-0785118206
Avengers: The Kree/Skrull War	Avengers #89-97	2000	978-0785132301
Avengers/Defenders War	Avengers #115-118; Defenders #8-11	2007	978-0785159025
Avengers: Celestial Madonna	Avengers #129-135; Giant-Size Avengers #2-4	2002	978-0785108269
Avengers: Legion of the Unliving	Avengers #131-132, 352-354, Annual #16	2012	978-0785159681
Avengers: The Coming of the Beast (hardcover)	Avengers #137-140, 145-146	2010	978-0785144687
Avengers: The Serpent Crown (hardcover)	Avengers #141-144, 147-149	2005	978-0785117001
Avengers: The Private War of Dr. Doom (hardcover)	Avengers #150-156, Annual #6	2011	978-0785162353
Avengers: The Bride of Ultron (hardcover)	Avengers #157-166	2012	978-0785162513
Avengers: Legends, Vol. 3	Avengers #161-162, 194-196, 201, Annual #6, 8	2003	978-0785109990
Avengers: The Korvac Saga	Avengers #167-168, 170-177	2003	978-0785144700
Avengers: Nights of Wundagore	Avengers #181-187	2009	978-0785137214
Avengers: Heart of Stone	Avengers #188-196, Annual #9	2013	978-0785184317
Avengers: Trial of Yellow Jacket	Avengers #212-230	2012	978-0785162070
Avengers: Absolute Vision Book 1	Avengers #231-241, Avengers Annual #11-12, Amazing Spider-Man Annual #16, Fantastic Four (1961) #256, and Doctor Strange (1974) #60	2013	978-0785185345
Avengers: Absolute Vision Book 2	Avengers #242-254, Avengers Annual #13	2014	978-0785185352
Avengers: The Legacy of Thanos	Avengers #255-261, Avengers Annual #14, and Fantastic Four Annual #19	2014	978-0785188919
Avengers: The Once and Future Kang	Avengers #262-269, Avengers Annual #15, West Coast Avengers Annual #1	2013	978-0785167297
Avengers: Under Siege	Avengers #270-271, 273-277	1998	978-0785107026
Avengers: Assault on Olympus	Avengers #278-285	2011	978-0785155331
Avengers: Heavy Metal	Avengers #286-293	2013	978-0785184522
Avengers by John Byrne Omnibus	West Coast Avengers vol. 2 #42-46; Avengers West Coast #47-62; Avengers West Coast Annual #4; Avengers #305-318; Avengers Annual #18; and material from Avengers Spotlight #23 and What the--?! #6	2016	978-1302900571
Galactic Storm, Book 1	Avengers #345-346; Captain America #398-399; Avengers West Coast #80-81; Quasar #32-33; Wonder Man #7-8; Iron Man #278; Thor #445	2006	978-0785120445
Galactic Storm, Book 2	Avengers #347; Captain America #400-401; Avengers West Coast #82; Quasar #34-35; Wonder Man #9; Iron Man #279; Thor #446; What If? #55-56	2006	978-0785120452
Heroes Reborn: Avengers	Avengers vol. 2 #1-12	2006	978-0785123378
Avengers: The Morgan Conquest	Avengers vol. 3 #1-4	2000	978-0785107286
Avengers: Supreme Justice	Avengers vol. 3 #5-7, Annual 1998; Iron Man #7; Captain America #8; Quicksilver #10	2001	978-0785107736
Clear and Present Dangers	Avengers vol. 3 #8-15	2001	978-0785107989
Avengers: Ultron Unlimited	Avengers vol. 3 #19-22, 0	2001	978-0785107743
Avengers: Living Legends	Avengers vol. 3 #23-30	2004	978-0785115618
Avengers/Thunderbolts Volume 1	Avengers vol. 3 #31-34, Thunderbolts #42-44	2004	978-0785114451
Avengers: Above and Beyond	Avengers vol. 3 #36-40, 56, Annual 2001; Avengers: The Ultron Imperative	2005	978-0785118459
Avengers: The Kang Dynasty	Avengers vol. 3 #41-55, Annual 2001	2002	978-0785109587
Avengers: World Trust	Avengers vol. 3 #57-61	2003	978-0785110804
The Avengers: Standoff	Avengers vol. 3 #62-64, Thor #58, Iron Man #64	2003	978-0785144670
The Avengers, Vol. 2: Red Zone	Avengers vol. 3 #64-70	2004	978-0785110996
The Avengers, Vol. 3: The Search for She-Hulk	Avengers vol. 3 #71-76	2004	978-0785112020
The Avengers, Vol. 4: Lionheart of Avalon	Avengers vol. 3 #77-81	2004	978-0785113386
The Avengers, Vol. 5: Once an Invader	Avengers vol. 3 #82-84; Invaders #0	2004	978-0785114819
Avengers: Disassembled	Avengers #500-503; Avengers Finale (one-shot)	2005	978-0785114826
Avengers by Brian M. Bendis Vol. 1	Avengers vol. 4 #1–6	2011	978-0785145004
Avengers by Brian M. Bendis Vol. 2	Avengers vol. 4 #7–12, #12.1	2011	978-0785145042
Avengers: Fear Itself	Avengers vol. 4 #13–17, New Avengers vol. 2 #14–16	2012	978-0785163480
Avengers by Brian M. Bendis Vol. 3	Avengers vol. 4 #18–24, #24.1	2012	978-0785151166
Avengers by Brian M. Bendis Vol. 4	Avengers vol. 4 #25-30	2013	978-0785160793
Avengers by Brian M. Bendis Vol. 5	Avengers vol. 4 #31-34, Annual #1, New Avengers vol. 2 Annual #1	2013	978-0785160816
Avengers: Avengers World!	Avengers vol. 5 #1–6	2013	978-0785168232
Avengers: The Last White Event!	Avengers vol. 5 #7-11	2013	978-0785168249
Avengers: Prelude to Infinity!	Avengers vol. 5 #12-17	2013	978-0785168256
Avengers: Infinity!	Avengers vol. 5 #18-23	2014	978-0785184140
Avengers: Adapt or Die!!	Avengers vol. 5 #24-28	2014	978-0785154778
Avengers: Infinite Avengers!	Avengers vol. 5 #29-34	2014	978-0785154785
Avengers: Time Runs Out Vol. 1	Avengers vol. 5 #35-37, New Avengers vol. 3 #24-25	2015	978-0785193418
Avengers: Time Runs Out Vol. 2	Avengers vol. 5 #38-39, New Avengers vol. 3 #26-28	2015	978-0785193722
Avengers: Time Runs Out Vol. 3	Avengers vol. 5 #40-42, New Avengers vol. 3 #29-30	2015	978-0785192220
Avengers: Time Runs Out Vol. 4	Avengers vol. 5 #43-44, New Avengers vol. 3 #31-33	2015	978-0785192244
Avengers: Unleashed Vol. 1: Kang War One	Avengers vol. 6 #1-6	2017	978-1302906115

=== All-New, All-Different Avengers ===
After the "Secret Wars" (2015) crossover story line, The Avengers relaunched as All-New, All-Different Avengers in October 2015.

Title	Material collected	Year	ISBN
Vol. 1	All-New, All-Different Avengers #1-6, material from Avengers: It All Begins Here #0 and Free Comic Book Day 2015 (Avengers) #1	2016	978-0785199670
Vol. 2	All-New, All-Different Avengers #7-12	2016	978-0785199687
Vol. 3	All-New, All-Different Avengers #13-15, Annual #1	2017	978-1302902360

=== Oversize hardback collections ===
Title	Material collected	Year	ISBN
Avengers Assemble, Vol. 1	Avengers vol. 3 #1-11, Annual 1998	2004	978-0785115731
Avengers Assemble, Vol. 2	Avengers vol. 3 #12-22, Annual 1999	2005	978-0785117735
Avengers Assemble, Vol. 3	Avengers vol. 3 #23-34, 1½; Thunderbolts #42-44	2006	978-0785121305
Avengers Assemble, Vol. 4	Avengers vol. 3 #35-40, Annual 2000, Annual 2001; Avengers: The Ultron Imperative; Maximum Security #1-3	2007	978-0785123477
Avengers Assemble, Vol. 5	Avengers vol. 3 #41-56	2007	978-0785123484

=== New Avengers ===
After the "Disassembled" crossover story line, The Avengers relaunched as New Avengers in January 2005.

Title	Material collected	Year	ISBN
Vol. 1: Breakout	New Avengers #1-6	2005	978-0785114796
Vol. 2: Sentry	New Avengers #7-10	2006	978-0785116721
Vol. 3: Secrets and Lies	New Avengers #11-15	2006	978-0785117063
Vol. 4: The Collective	New Avengers #16-20	2007	978-0785119876
Vol. 5: Civil War	New Avengers #21-25	2007	978-0785124467
Vol. 6: Revolution	New Avengers #26-31	2007	978-0785124689
Vol. 7: The Trust	New Avengers #32-37	2008	978-0785125037
Vol. 8: Secret Invasion, Book 1	New Avengers #38-42	2009	978-0785129479
Vol. 9: Secret Invasion, Book 2	New Avengers #43-47	2009	978-0785129493
Vol. 10: Power	New Avengers #48-50; Secret Invasion: Dark Reign (one-shot)	2009	978-0785135609
Vol. 11: Search for the Sorcerer Supreme	New Avengers #51-54	2009	978-0785136903
Vol. 12: Power Loss	New Avengers #55-60	2010	978-0785145752
Vol. 13: Siege	New Avengers #61-64, Annual #3; The List: New Avengers; New Avengers Finale	2010	978-0785145783
Vol. 1	New Avengers Vol. 2 #1-6	2011	978-0785148722
Vol. 2	New Avengers Vol. 2 #7-13	2011	978-0785148746
Avengers: Fear Itself	Avengers vol. 4 #13–17, New Avengers vol. 2 #14–16	2012	978-0785163480
Vol. 3	New Avengers Vol. 2 #16.1, #17-23	2012	978-0785151791
Vol. 4	New Avengers Vol. 2 #24-30	2012	978-0785161561
Vol. 5	New Avengers Vol. 2 #31-34	2013	978-0785161585
Vol. 1: Everything Dies Now!	New Avengers Vol. 3 #1-6	2013	978-0785168362
Vol. 2: Infinity!	New Avengers Vol. 3 #7-12	2014	978-0785168379
Vol. 3: Other Worlds!	New Avengers Vol. 3 #13INH, #14-17	2014	978-0785154846
Vol. 4: A Perfect World!	New Avengers Vol. 3 #18-23	2014	978-0785154853
Avengers: Time Runs Out Vol. 1	Avengers vol. 5 #35-37, New Avengers vol. 3 #24-25	2015	978-0785193418
Avengers: Time Runs Out Vol. 2	Avengers vol. 5 #38-39, New Avengers vol. 3 #26-28	2015	978-0785193722
Avengers: Time Runs Out Vol. 3	Avengers vol. 5 #40-42, New Avengers vol. 3 #29-30	2015	978-0785192220
Avengers: Time Runs Out Vol. 4	Avengers vol. 5 #43-44, New Avengers vol. 3 #31-33	2015	978-0785192244
A.I.M. Vol. 1: Everything is New	New Avengers vol. 4 #1-6, material from Avengers: It All Begins Here #0 (New Avengers story)	2016	978-0785196488
A.I.M. Vol. 2: Standoff	New Avengers vol. 4 #7-11	2016	978-0785196495
A.I.M. Vol. 3: Civil War II	New Avengers vol. 4 #12-18	2017	978-1302902353

=== Mighty Avengers ===
After the "Civil War" crossover story arc, the official Avengers were relaunched by Iron Man as the Mighty Avengers, with their own series, while the New Avengers went underground, continuing their own individual series.

Title	Material collected	Year	ISBN
Vol. 1: The Ultron Initiative	Mighty Avengers #1-6	2008	978-0785123682
Vol. 2: Venom Bomb	Mighty Avengers #7-11	2008	978-0785123699
Vol. 3: Secret Invasion, Book 1	Mighty Avengers #12-15	2009	978-0785130109
Vol. 4: Secret Invasion, Book 2	Mighty Avengers #16-20	2009	978-0785136507
Vol. 5: Earth's Mightiest	Mighty Avengers #21-26	2009	978-0785137467
Vol. 6: The Unspoken	Mighty Avengers #27-32	2010	978-0785137474
Vol. 7: Siege	Mighty Avengers #32-36	2010	978-0785148005

=== Avengers: The Initiative ===
The Avengers: The Initiative story run began after the "Civil War" crossover story arc, with the story based around the 50 State Initiative, set up as part of the Superhuman Registration Act.

Title	Material collected	Year	ISBN
Vol. 1: Basic Training	The Initiative #1-6	2008	978-0785125167
Vol. 2: Killed in Action	The Initiative #7-13, Annual #1	2008	978-0785128618
Vol. 3: Secret Invasion	The Initiative #14-19	2009	978-0785131670
Vol. 4: Disassembled	The Initiative #20-25; The Initiative Featuring Reptil (one-shot)	2009	978-0785131519
Vol. 5: Dreams and Nightmares	The Initiative #26-31	2010	978-0785139041
Vol. 6: Siege	The Initiative #31-36	2010	978-0785148180

=== Secret Avengers ===
Secret Avengers has been collected in the following hardcovers:

Title	Material collected	Year	ISBN
Secret Avengers, Vol. 1: Mission to Mars	Secret Avengers #1–5	2011	0785145990
Secret Avengers, Vol. 2: Eyes of the Dragon	Secret Avengers #6–12	2011	0785146016
Fear Itself: Secret Avengers	Secret Avengers #12.1, 13–15; Fear Itself: Black Widow	2012	078515177X
Secret Avengers, Vol. 3: Run the Mission, Don't Get Seen, Save the World	Secret Avengers #16–21	2012	0785152555
Secret Avengers: The Descendants	Secret Avengers #21.1, 22–25	2012	078516118X
Secret Avengers by Rick Remender Volume 2	Secret Avengers #26–32	2012	0785161201
Secret Avengers by Rick Remender Volume 3	Secret Avengers #33-37	2013	0785161228

=== Solo Avengers ===
Title	Material collected	Year	ISBN
Avengers: Solo Avengers Classic Volume 1	Solo Avengers #1-10	2012	978-0785159032

=== Uncanny Avengers ===
Uncanny Avengers has been collected in the following hardcovers:

Title	Material collected	Year	ISBN
Uncanny Avengers 1: The Red Shadow	Uncanny Avengers #1–5	2013	978-0785168447
Uncanny Avengers 2: Apocalypse Twins	Uncanny Avengers #6–11	2013	978-0785168454
Uncanny Avengers 3: Ragnarok Now	Uncanny Avengers #12–17	2014	978-0785184836
Uncanny Avengers 4: Avenge Earth	Uncanny Avengers #18–22	2014	978-0785154235
Uncanny Avengers 5: Axis Prelude	Uncanny Avengers #23–25, Annual #1, Magneto #9-10	2015	978-0785154259
Uncanny Avengers Omnibus	Uncanny Avengers #1-25, #8AU, Annual #1	2015	978-0785193944
Uncanny Avengers 1: Counter-Evolutionary (paperback)	Uncanny Avengers vol. 2 #1-5	2015	978-0785192374

Avengers Omnibus

Many of the Avengers titles have been collected in omnibus editions:

=== West Coast Avengers ===
Title	Material Collected	Publication Date	ISBN
West Coast Avengers: Assemble	Collects West Coast Avengers #1-4, Iron Man Annual #7, and The Avengers #250, plus material from The Avengers #239, #243-244, and #246, and Avengers West Coast #100.	June 2010	ISBN 978-0785143215
Avengers: West Coast Avengers: Family Ties	Collects West Coast Avengers vol. 2 #1-9 and Vision and the Scarlet Witch vol. 2 #1-2.	June 2011	ISBN 978-0785155003
Avengers: West Coast Avengers: Sins of the Past	Collects West Coast Avengers vol. 2 #10-16, West Coast Avengers Annual #1 and The Avengers Annual #15.	December 2011	ISBN 978-0785159001
Avengers: West Coast Avengers: Lost in Space-Time	Collects West Coast Avengers vol. 2 #17-24, Fantastic Four #19, and Doctor Strange vol. 2 #53	April 2012	ISBN 978-0785162216
Avengers: West Coast Avengers: Zodiac Attack	Collects West Coast Avengers vol. 2 #25-30, West Coast Avengers Annual #2 and Avengers Annual #16	July 2012	ISBN 978-0785162537
Avengers West Coast Visionaries - John Byrne, Vol. 1: Vision Quest	Collects West Coast Avengers vol. 2 #42-47 and Avengers West Coast #48-50.	August 2005	ISBN 978-0785117742
Avengers West Coast: Vision Quest	Collects West Coast Avengers vol. 2 #42-47 and Avengers West Coast #48-50.	2015	ISBN 978-0785197409
Avengers West Coast Visionaries - John Byrne, Vol. 2: Darker than Scarlet	Collects Avengers West Coast #51-57 and #60-62.	January 2008	ISBN 978-0785130277
Avengers West Coast: Along Came A Spider-Woman	Collects Avengers West Coast #58-59 and #63-75.	June 2012	ISBN 978-0785162322
Avengers: Galactic Storm: Volume 1	Collects Avengers West Coast #80-81, Captain America #398-399, Quasar #32-33, Wonder Man #7-8, The Avengers #345-346, Iron Man #278, and Thor #445.	March 2006	ISBN 978-0785120445
Avengers: Galactic Storm: Volume 2	Collects Avengers West Coast #82, Iron Man #279, Thor #446, Captain America #400-401, Quasar #34-35, Wonder Man #9, The Avengers #347, and What If? #55-56.	December 2006	ISBN 978-0785120452
Avengers: Ultron Unbound	Collects Avengers West Coast #89-91, Annual 8 and Vision 1-4.	May 2015	ISBN 978-0785192695
Avengers: The Death of Mockingbird	Collects Avengers West Coast #92-100, 102; Spider-Woman (1993) #1-4; Material From Marvel Comics Presents (1988) #143-144.	February 2016	ISBN 978-0785196891
West Coast Avengers Omnibus Vol. 1	Collects West Coast Avengers #1-4; Iron Man Annual #7; The Avengers #250; West Coast Avengers vol. 2 #1-16; Vision and the Scarlet Witch vol. 2 #1-2; The Avengers Annual #15; West Coast Avengers Annual #1; material from The Avengers #239, 243-244, 246; material from Avengers West Coast #100	April 2013	ISBN 978-0785167457
West Coast Avengers Omnibus Vol. 2	Collects West Coast Avengers vol. 2 #17-41; West Coast Avengers Annual #2-3; Avengers Annual #16; Fantastic Four #19; and Doctor Strange vol. 2 #53	November 2013	ISBN 978-0785167471
Avengers by John Byrne Omnibus	Collects West Coast Avengers vol. 2 #42-46; Avengers West Coast #47-62; Avengers West Coast Annual #4; Avengers #305-318; Avengers Annual #18; and material from Avengers Spotlight #23 and What the--?! #6	July 2016	ISBN 978-1302900571

== Indices ==
- Official Marvel Index to the Avengers #1-8 (August 1987 – October 1988)
- Official Marvel Index to the Avengers #1-6 (October 1994 – March 1995)
