= Simon Williams (artist) =

British cartoonist

- Born: 1973 (age 52–53); Wales, United Kingdom
- Occupation: Comic artist
- Notable work: Spectacular Spider-Man Adventures, The Incredible Hulk, Retro Tales, The Hoff - Heroes of Fearless Freedom

Simon Williams is a Welsh comic artist, based in Cardiff who has worked professionally in comics since 2003. Most recently Williams has become well known for his collaborations with David Hasselhoff and Jon Mikl Thor.

== Biography ==
Williams started drawing comics from an early age, influenced by the artwork of Marvel Comics artists Sal Buscema, Jack Kirby and John Byrne. During his teenage years, Simon sought advice from local professional comic artists Mike Collins and David Roach.

After graduating from university, Williams started drawing comics professionally in 2003, working for Panini Comics Transformers: Armada and Action Man comics. He then went on to draw Spectacular Spider-Man Adventures, The Incredible Hulk, Death's Head, and Marvel Heroes for Panini's Marvel UK comics.

Williams has also produced artwork for various other forms of media, such as DVDs, toys and collectable merchandise. Most notably he produced covers for Clear Vision's line of Marvel Comics DVDs. He also provided covers for the UK releases of the classic Marvel cartoons, including The Incredible Hulk (1966, 1982 and 1996 shows), X-Men and Spider-Man (both the 1967 and 1994 shows).

Williams is also the creator of the Discotronic Funk Commandos, a group of superheroes from the 1970s. They are an affectionate parody of comics, music, film and TV from that era. The comic will also be featuring special guest-star appearances from David Hasselhoff and Jon Mikl Thor. He has collaborated with both in developing Hasselhoff's comic book and cartoon project, The Hoff: Heroes of Fearless Freedom, and also producing album artwork for Thor's upcoming Thunderstryke 2 album.

== Bibliography ==
=== Past works ===
- Transformers: Armada - Panini Comics
- Action Man - Panini Comics
- Spectacular Spider-Man Adventures - Panini Comics (under Marvel imprint)
- The Incredible Hulk Annual 2005 - Panini Comics (under Marvel imprint)
- Spider-Man: Tower of Power - Eaglemoss Publications
- Transformers: Beast Wars Sourcebook - IDW Publishing
- Hulk 100 Project: Hero Initiative - Marvel Comics
- Death's Head volumes 1 & 2: Panini Books (under Marvel imprint)
- Marvel Heroes - Panini Comics (under Marvel Imprint)

=== Current projects ===
- Retro Tales - featuring the Discotronic Funk Commandos - Retro Comics Group
- The HOFF - Heroes of Fearless Freedom - Hoff World Plc/Retro Comics Group
