= Auto Assembly =

Transformers convention in Birmingham, England

Official Auto Assembly logo

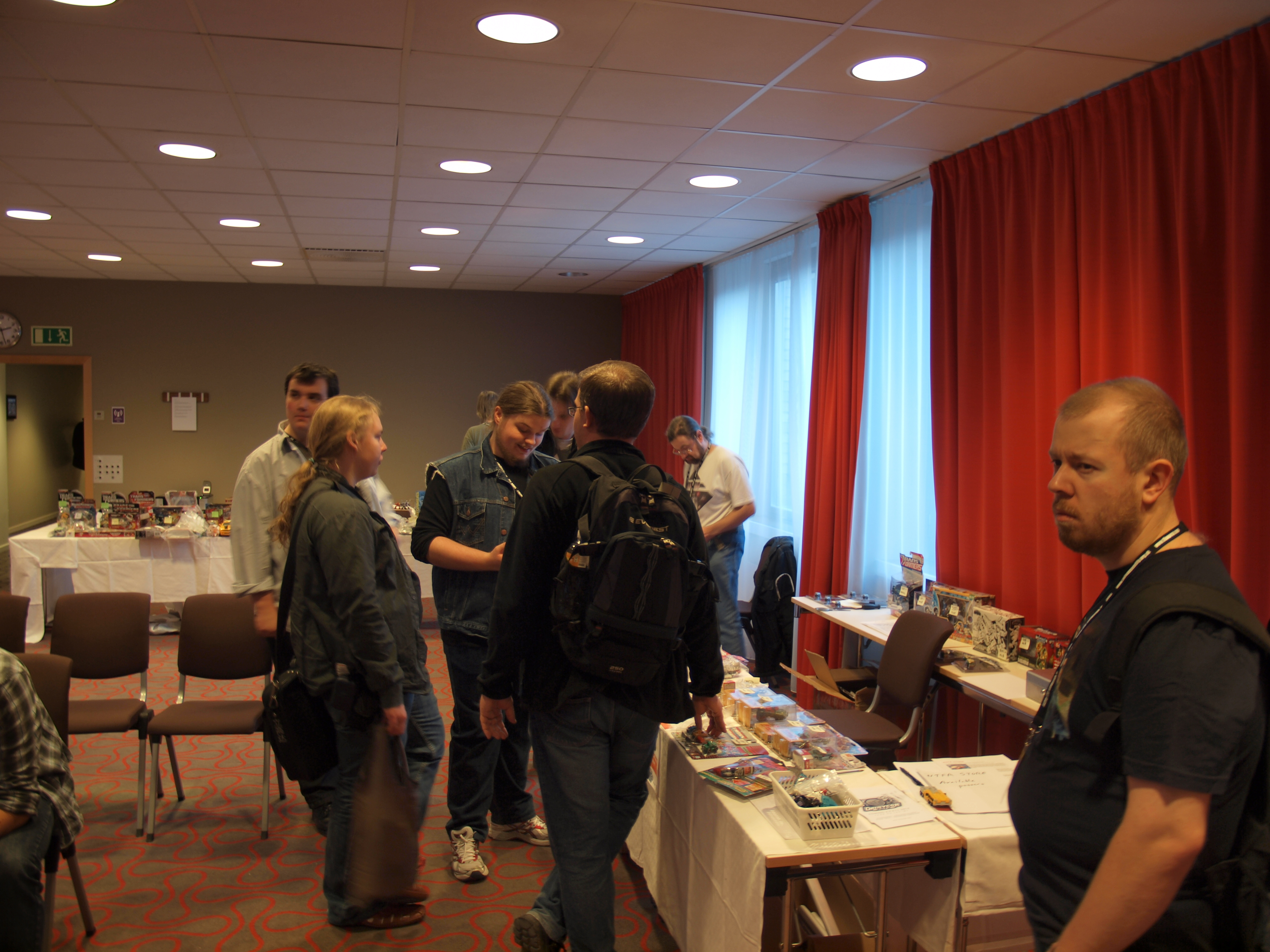
Attendees at Auto Assembly Europe 2011.

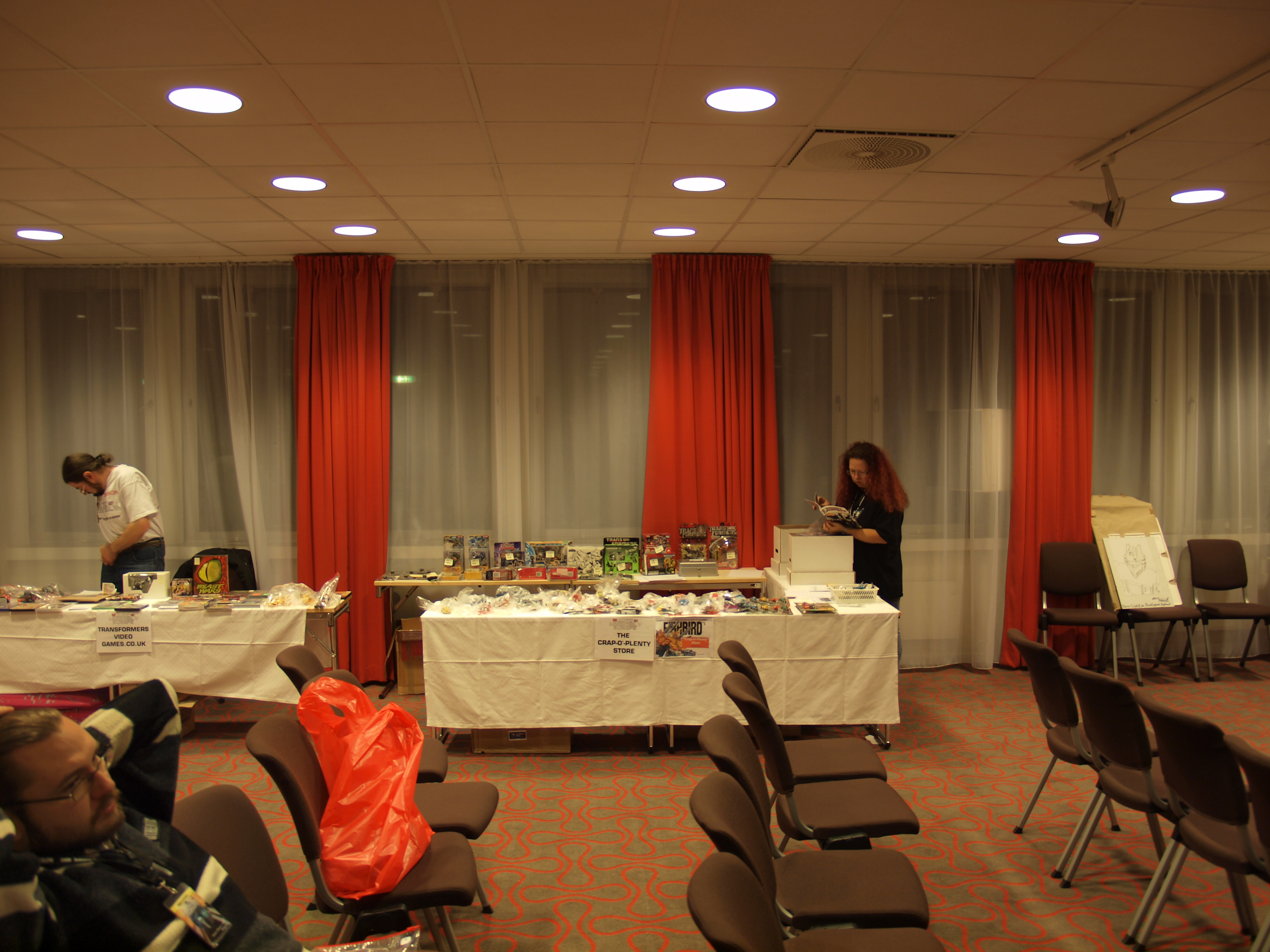
Dealer tables at Auto Assembly Europe 2011.

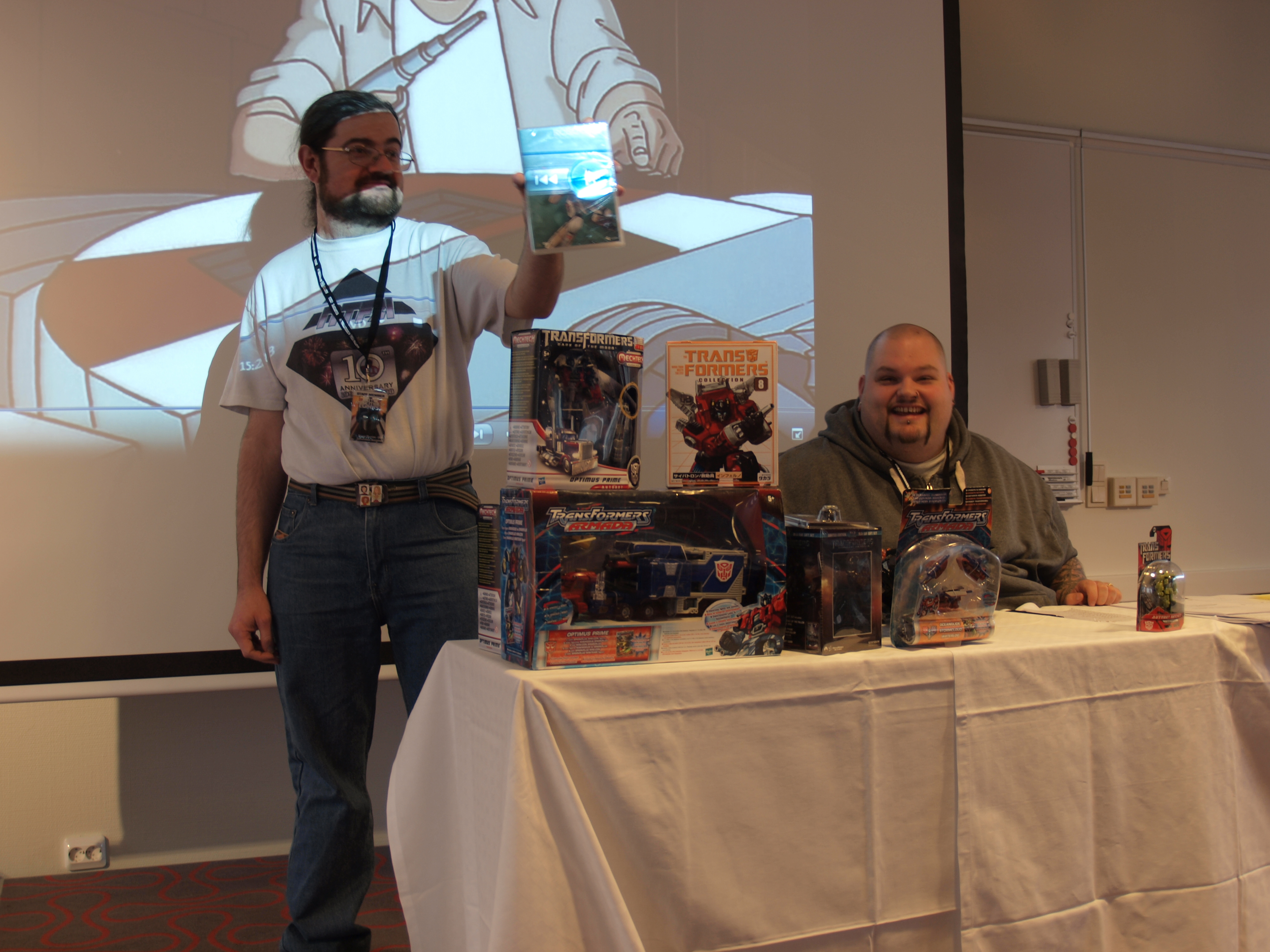
Simon Plumbe and Peter Casselö, some of the organisers of Auto Assembly Europe 2011.

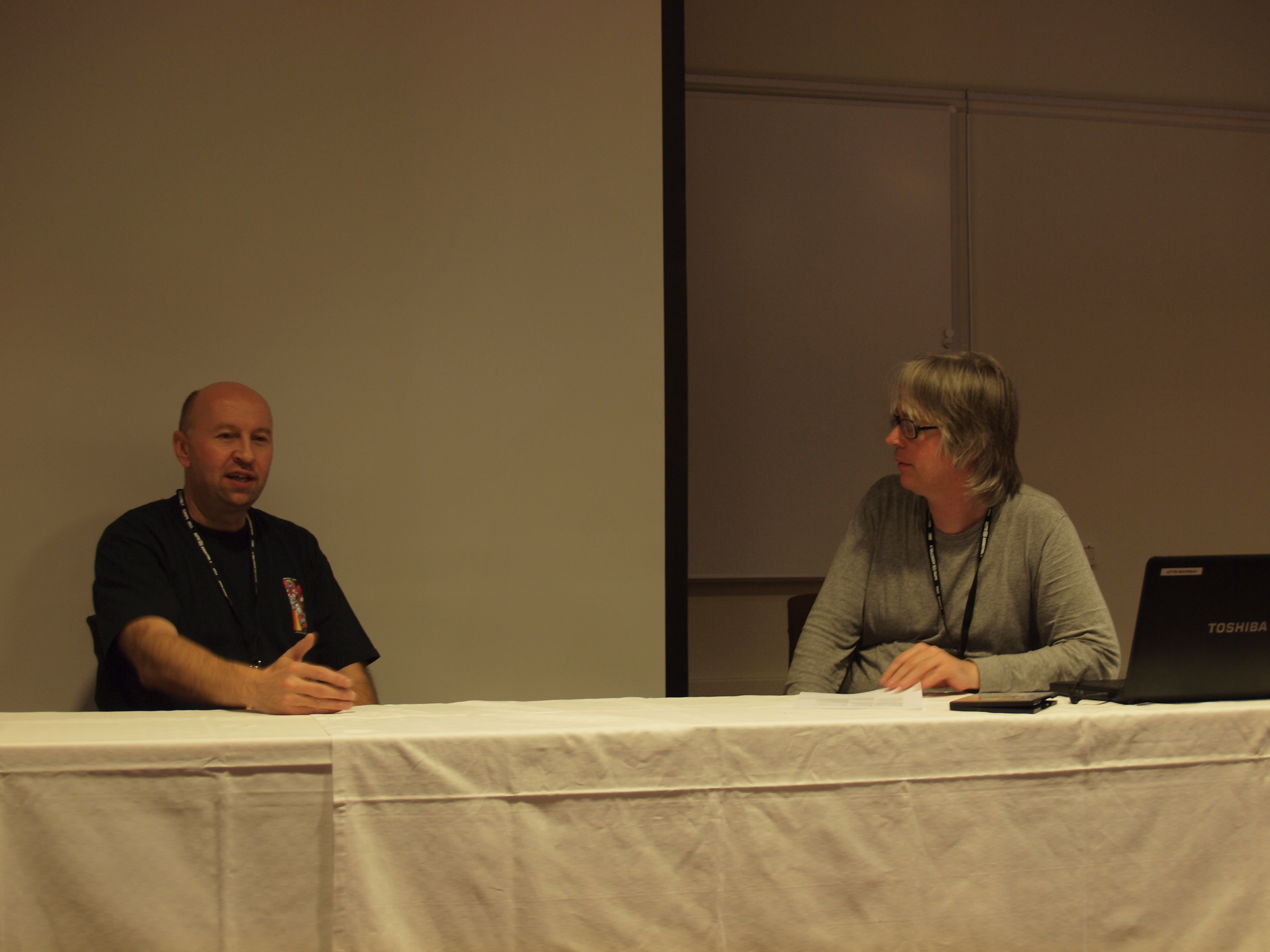
Simon Furman, the guest of honour of Auto Assembly 2011, being interviewed by Lars Eriksson, one of the organisers.

Auto Assembly was a Transformers convention held in Birmingham, UK and run by the science fiction fan organisation Infinite Frontiers. Auto Assembly was first in development from 1994 under the names BotCon UK and Ia-Con. It was officially founded in 2000 as "The Auto-Assembly" by Sven Harvey.

The first event was held in October 2000 and was held annually (except in 2002 and 2007 when it took "gap years") until the final event in 2015. The event was originally called "The Auto-Assembly", and came to be referred to colloquially as "AA".

Sven Harvey stepped down from his role with the event between the 2008 and 2009 conventions due to various issues unrelated to the event but has now returned to the team. Head of Infinite Frontiers Simon Plumbe is now the owner of the convention, working with a team of volunteers.

The convention started life as a small-scale event, intended to be an occasional Transformers-themed equivalent of the meetings held by the Star Trek fan club Alpha Quadrant (which itself grew from the Delta Quadrant '96 convention run by Infinite Frontiers). The first event was expected to have a relatively small number of fans attending — smaller than the Star Trek meetings — although this figure was exceeded. Sven's original idea was to grow the meetings over time and then launch the Ia-con convention as an annual event based on the meetings, which originally were to be quarterly. "The Auto-Assembly" ran on October 22, 2000, and was run by Sven with Simon in a support administrative role. From the first meeting, however, the event grew rapidly and by 2003 "The Auto-Assembly" name was so strong a brand that calling it Ia-con would have been a confusing move. Auto Assembly 2003, only the third event, had expanded to a full-scale convention, though at that point it was referred to as a Transformers Collectors Fair. The growth of the event and the friendliness of the fans in attendance actually converted Simon into a Transformers fan in the process.

The convention attracts fans from all over the UK, Europe, and as far afield as America and Australia and currently holds the European attendance record with 1064 fans attending Auto Assembly 2015 from the UK and Europe.

The convention has a range of activities, including dealers tables, guest talks, autograph sessions, toy and art displays, video screenings, competitions, charity auctions, workshops (added for 2009) and more. Auto Assembly 2009 featured the convention's first live band as part of its programme — former boy band turned rock band, Next of Kin. In association with sponsors every year, the convention also gives all of its attendees a "goodie bag" filled with complimentary gifts, which have included a range of items, including postcards, comics, magazines, stickers, PlayStation 2 games, posters, and snacks.

Regular guests at the convention have included Transformers comic writer Simon Furman, artists Andrew Wildman, Lee Sullivan, Geoff Senior, Simon Williams, and colourist Jason Cardy.

Past voice actor guests have included G1 actor Gregg Berger, voice of Grimlock in Transformers Gen 1, “Beast Wars” voice actor Ian James Corlett, (Cheetor), Transformers Gen 1 actor Dan Gilvezan (Bumblebee), Neil Kaplan (Optimus Prime and Ro-Tor, “Transformers: Robots in Disguise”), David Kaye (Megatron from Beast Wars, Beast Machines, Transformers: Armada, Transformers: Energon, Transformers: Cybertron and Optimus Prime in Transformers: Animated), Michael McConnohie (Tracks and Cosmos in “Transformers Gen 1” as well as Hot Shot and Ironhide in “Transformers: Robots in Disguise”), and Wally Wingert (Sideburn and Mirage from Transformers: Robots In Disguise).

Auto Assembly: Target 2006, inspired by the Marvel UK comic story of the same name, had the Auto Assembly debut appearances of artists Guido Guidi and Mike Collins, and the first UK appearance by its guest of honour voice actor David Kaye along with its regular comic guests.

In March 2006, the convention expanded its activities further with the launch of the Auto Assembly Podcast which featured the normally expected chat and news updates, but also included interviews, competitions and music. The podcast was hosted by Simon Plumbe and Sven Harvey, who ran the event at the time.

Auto Assembly 2008 was notable by having its first display from Hasbro featuring the unveiling of handmade resin versions of Transformers: Animated Optimus Prime, Megatron and Bulkhead being given away through a prize draw from an online competition. It also saw the world debut of the trailer for the Transformers: Animated game for the Nintendo DS from Activision. The convention also attracted a great deal of media attention and was attended by a television camera crew from Central News who filmed for a news broadcast, a radio broadcaster from BBC Radio WM attended, and a live interview with Sven Harvey for BBC Radio 5 Live took place early in the day.

The first Auto Assembly Europe convention was held in November 2011, was held in Uppsala, Sweden. It was organised as a joint operation between the Auto Assembly organisers and the Nordic TransFans Association.

In March 2015, it was announced that Auto Assembly 2015 would be the final Auto Assembly event due to conflicts with the health and personal lives of the team members at the time. Auto Assembly itself is continuing with other activities including the publication of its fanzine The Cybertronian Times.

The convention has definitely come to an end now with TF Nation taking its place, but the Auto Assembly and Infinite Frontiers website continue, and the founder is running the Autobase Birmingham fan club which is closely linked to the Spacedock Birmingham Star Trek fan club and is maintaining ties with Transmasters UK (TMUK). Ia-con is still in development.

== Convention Exclusives ==
Each year the convention produced a full colour fanzine, The Cybertronian Times, which features articles, artwork, fiction and reviews covering all eras of Transformers. In previous years, this fanzine has featured contributions from Simon Furman, Lee Sullivan and Simon Williams. Additional convention exclusives have been produced, including postcards from 2003 onwards and pin badges for 2005 and 2006.

- 2003 - The Cybertronian Times Issue 5, Optimus Prime postcard (Lee Sullivan artwork), Megatron postcard (Lee Sullivan artwork)
- 2004 - The Cybertronian Times Issue 6, Devastator postcard (Andrew Wildman artwork), Sideburn/Mirage postcard (Lee Sullivan artwork), Transformers: The Ultimate Guide (Wildfur / Auto Assembly Bookplated Edition)
- 2005 - The Cybertronian Times Issue 7, RiD Optimus Prime postcard (Simon Williams artwork), Pin badge (1 of 2)
- 2006 - The Cybertronian Times Issue 8, Beast Wars Megatron postcard (Simon Williams artwork), Cougar postcard (Guido Guidi artwork), Pin badge (2 of 2), Auto Assembly lanyard
- 2008 - The Cybertronian Times Issue 9, MiniCT Issue 3, Bumblebee/Spiderman postcard (Simon Williams artwork), TF Animated Jazz postcard (Kat Nicholson artwork), G1 Optimus Prime postcard (Lee Sullivan artwork), Bumblebee/Spiderman keyring (Simon Williams artwork), TF Animated Jazz keyring (Kat Nicholson artwork), G1 Optimus Prime keyring (Lee Sullivan artwork)
- 2009 - The Cybertronian Times Issue 10, Beast Wars Cheetor postcard (Simon Williams / Kris Carter artwork), G1 Grimlock postcard (Andrew Wildman artwork), Beast Wars Cheetor keyring (Simon Williams artwork), G1 Grimlock keyring (Andrew Wildman artwork), Auto Assembly 2009 lanyard, IDW Publishing All Hail Megatron Issue 13 Auto Assembly 2009 exclusive variant cover (Nick Roche / Liam Shalloo artwork), Auto Assembly 2009 mug (Andrew Wildman/Simon Williams/Jason Cardy/Kat Nicholson/Kris Carter artwork)
- 2010 - The Cybertronian Times Issue 11, Beast Wars Optimus Primal postcard (Simon Williams / Kris Carter artwork), Beast Wars Optimus Primal keyring (Simon Williams / Kris Carter artwork), IDW Publishing Transformers Issue 9 Auto Assembly 2010 exclusive variant cover (Nick Roche / Liam Shalloo artwork)
- 2011 - The Cybertronian Times Issue 12, Transformers Animated Optimus Prime postcard (Kat Nicholson artwork), Transformers Animated Optimus Prime keyring (Kat Nicholson artwork), Death's Head Postcard (Simon Williams / Kris Carter artwork), G1 Grimlock postcard (Simon Williams / Liam Shalloo artwork)
- 2012 - The Cybertronian Times Issue 13, Iacon Independent (convention exclusive comic), Transformers Animated Sentinel Prime postcard (Kat Nicholson artwork), Galvatron postcard (Jeff Anderson artwork), Galvatron lithograph (Jeff Anderson / Kris Carter artwork), Convention guest lithograph (Ed Pirrie / Liam Shalloo artwork)

== Convention Dates ==
Twelve Auto Assembly events have been held to-date, relocating as new venues have been needed to accommodate the growing attendance figures. Attendance figures are listed in brackets after the venue.

- 2000: 22 October 2000 - Ibis Hotel, Birmingham, England (31)
- 2001: 4 March 2001 - Ibis Hotel, Birmingham, England (61)
- 2002: No convention
- 2003: 2 August 2003 - Britannia Hotel, Birmingham, England (234)
- 2004: 8–9 May 2004 - Britannia Hotel, Birmingham, England (320)
- 2005: 4 June 2005 - Clarendon Suites, Birmingham, England (409)
- 2006: 3 June 2006 - Clarendon Suites, Birmingham, England (400)
- 2007: No convention
- 2008: 2 August 2008 - Clarendon Suites, Birmingham, England (423)
- 2009: 15–16 August 2009 - Holiday Inn Birmingham City Centre, Smallbrook Queensway, Birmingham, England (501)
- 2010: 13–15 August 2010 - Holiday Inn Birmingham City Centre, Smallbrook Queensway, Birmingham, England (579)
- 2011: 12–14 August 2011 - Holiday Inn Birmingham City Centre, Smallbrook Queensway, Birmingham, England (577)
  - 2011: 12–13 November 2011 - Clarion Gillet Hotel, Uppsala, Sweden (Auto Assembly Europe)
- 2012: 3–5 August 2012 - Hilton Birmingham Metropole Hotel, Birmingham, England (773)
- 2013: 9–11 August 2013 - Hilton Birmingham Metropole Hotel, Birmingham, England (833)
- 2014: 8–10 August 2014 - Hilton Birmingham Metropole Hotel, Birmingham, England (938)
- 2015: 21–23 August 2015 - Hilton Birmingham Metropole Hotel, Birmingham, England (1,064)

== Convention Guests ==
The convention has been joined by a number of guests over the years. To date, the following have attended or are scheduled to attend:

- Stephen Baskerville - 2011, 2012, 2013
- **Michael Bell** - 2012
- **Gregg Berger** - 2009, 2011,2012 (live via video link-up)
- **Steve Blum** - 2013
- John-Paul Bove - 2011, 2012, 2013, 2014, 2015
- Lee Bradley - 2008, 2009, 2010, 2011, 2012, 2013, 2014, 2015
- Jason Cardy - 2004, 2005, 2006, 2008, 2009, 2010, 2011, 2012, 2013, 2014, 2015
- Kris Carter - 2009, 2010, 2011, 2012, 2013, 2014, 2015
- **Garry Chalk** - 2010
- **Townsend Coleman** - 2012, 2014
- Mike Collins - 2006, 2009
- **Ian James Corlett** - 2009
- Jon Davis-Hunt - 2009
- **Paul Eiding** - 2012
- Bill Forster - 2010
- Simon Furman - 2003, 2004, 2005, 2006, 2008, 2010, 2011, 2011 (Auto Assembly Europe), 2012, 2013, 2014, 2015
- **Dan Gilvezan** - 2008, 2013
- Andrew Griffith - 2013, 2015
- Martin Griffiths - 2008
- Guido Guidi - 2006
- James Horan - 2015
- **Neil Kaplan** - 2005, 2013
- **David Kaye** - 2006, 2011
- Jane Lawson - 2003, 2004, 2008
- Staz Johnson - 2008, 2009
- **Michael McConnohie** - 2014
- John McCrea - 2008
- **Scott McNeil** - 2010
- Alex Milne - 2013, 2014, 2015
- Sumalee Montano - 2015
- Kat Nicholson - 2006, 2008, 2009, 2010, 2011, 2012, 2013, 2014, 2015
- Next Of Kin - 2009
- Ed Pirrie - 2012, 2013
- Livio Ramondelli - 2012, 2014
- James Roberts - 2010, 2011, 2012, 2013, 2014, 2015
- Nick Roche - 2009, 2010, 2011, 2012, 2013, 2014, 2015
- **Mark Ryan** - 2011 (live via video link-up)
- Geoff Senior - 2005, 2008, 2011
- Liam Shalloo - 2008, 2009, 2010, 2011, 2012, 2013, 2014, 2015
- **David Sobolov** - 2014
- Jim Sorenson - 2010, 2013, 2014, 2015
- **Peter Spellos** - 2014, 2015
- Lew Stringer - 2009
- Lee Sullivan - 2004, 2005, 2006, 2009
- Andrew Wildman - 2003, 2004, 2005, 2006, 2008, 2009, 2011, 2012, 2013, 2014, 2015
- Simon Williams - 2004, 2005, 2006, 2008, 2009, 2010, 2011
- **Wally Wingert** - 2004
- **Derrick J Wyatt** - 2010
- Kei Zama - 2015

Notes

- Lew Stringer was scheduled to attend as the convention's first ever guest in 2001 but was unable to attend at the last minute due to transport difficulties. He was also due to be a guest at the 2008 event, but had to pull out due to work commitments.
- Guests of honour are indicated in **bold**.

== The Auto Assembly Forum ==
The Auto Assembly Forum is run by convention committee head Simon Plumbe, with the help of the moderators. The forum is not as busy as many of the larger Transformers forums, but is still a vibrant fan community. It was founded on 19 August 2003 following Auto Assembly 2003 to act as a support forum for the conventions, but it quickly developed into a thriving community all of its own. The forum was closed in the Summer of 2011 due to dwindling usage and was relaunched in September of the same year on a new server to coincide of the relaunch and redesign of the conventions website.

== Sources ==
- Attendance figures - Official Auto Assembly attendance figures from 2000 to 2015 provided to this article by the convention organisers. Revised 31 August 2015.
- Article content expanded by convention organisers (last update by convention head, 31 August 2015)
- All current article contents continually reviewed and monitored by convention committee.
