= Keith Pollard =

American comic book artist (born 1950)

- Pollard at GalaxyCon San Jose in 2026
- Born: January 20, 1950 (age 76)
- Area: Penciller
- Notable works: The Amazing Spider-Man; Fantastic Four; Thor
- Awards: Inkpot Award (2017)

Keith Pollard (/ˈpɒlərd/; born January 20, 1950) is an American comic book artist. Originally from the Detroit area, Pollard is best known for his simultaneous work on the Marvel Comics titles The Amazing Spider-Man, Fantastic Four, and Thor in the late 1970s and early 1980s.

== Career ==
Keith Pollard made his professional comics debut in 1974 with stints on such titles as Master of Kung Fu, Deadly Hands of Kung Fu, Astonishing Tales, and Black Goliath. In the mid 1970s he also drew original covers for some of the weekly titles in the Marvel UK imprint. He was the regular penciller of The Amazing Spider-Man from issue #186 (Nov. 1978) through issue #205 (June 1980) and pencilled the backup feature in The Amazing Spider-Man Annual #15 (1981). With writer Marv Wolfman, Pollard introduced the Black Cat in The Amazing Spider-Man #194 (July 1979). Wolfman and Pollard were the creative team for both Fantastic Four #200 (Nov. 1978) and The Amazing Spider-Man #200 (Jan. 1980).

Pollard was also the regular penciler of Thor issues #286–320. In 1982, Pollard moved to DC Comics where he drew part of Wonder Woman #300 (Feb. 1983) and launched the Vigilante series with Marv Wolfman. He and Elliot S. Maggin co-created the Kristin Wells version of Superwoman in DC Comics Presents Annual #2 (1983).

In 1987, he returned to Marvel where he had a second run on Fantastic Four, with writer Steve Englehart, that lasted until 1989. Afterwards, he pencilled Nick Fury, Agent of S.H.I.E.L.D. #2–10.

Pollard and Stan Lee produced the Silver Surfer: The Enslavers graphic novel in 1990. In the early 1990s, he drew all the character profiles for the Official Handbook of the Marvel Universe Master Edition.

Pollard left comics in 1996, though he occasionally makes appearances at comic book conventions. For ten years, he worked for a computer company. He returned to comics in 2019 with a story for DC Primal Age Giant, written by Marv Wolfman.

== Awards ==
Keith Pollard received the Inkpot Award in 2017.

== Bibliography ==
=== DC Comics ===
- DC Comics Presents Annual #2 (1983)
- DC Primal Age Giant #1 (2019)
- Green Lantern #157–165 (1982–1983)
- Justice League of America #197 (1981)
- The New Teen Titans #35–36 (1983)
- Vigilante #1–3, 5 (1983–1984)
- Who's Who: The Definitive Directory of the DC Universe #18, 23 (1986–1987)
- Wonder Woman #300 (1983)
- World's Finest Comics #279 (1982)

==== Milestone Media ====
- Hardware #20, 40 (1994–1996)
- Heroes #6 (1996)
- Static #40 (1996)

=== Harvey Comics ===
- SeaQuest #1 (1994)

=== Illustrated Comics ===
- Classic Jonny Quest (four promotional minicomics) (1996)

=== Innovation Publishing ===
- Cobalt Blue #1–2 (1989)

=== Marvel Comics ===
- Alpha Flight #127 (1993)
- The Amazing Spider-Man #186–205, Annual #15 (1978–1981)
- Astonishing Tales #30–32, 36 (1975–1976)
- The Avengers #146, Annual #16 (1976, 1987)
- Black Goliath #5 (1976)
- Blackwulf #5 (1994)
- Blaze #9 (1995)
- Daredevil #143, 242, 341–343 (1977, 1987, 1995)
- Deadly Hands of Kung Fu #5 (1974)
- Eternals vol. 2 #10–11 (1986)
- Fantastic Four #193–201, 203–206, 310–312, 314–320, 322–324, 326–328, Annual #12 (1978–1979, 1987–1989)
- Fantastic Four Roast #1 (1982)
- Ghost Rider #22 (1977)
- Hulk #12 (1978)
- Inhumans #10–12 (1977)
- Iron Man #73–74, 107, 110–112 (1975–1978)
- Jungle Action #24 (1976)
- Lethal Foes of Spider-Man #3 (1993)
- Marvel Graphic Novel: Silver Surfer: The Enslavers HC (1990)
- Marvel Super-Heroes vol. 2 #1, 15 (1990–1993)
- Master of Kung Fu #26, 36–37, 52, Giant-Size #4, Annual #1 (1975–1977)
- Moon Knight #26 (1982)
- Ms. Marvel #9 (1977)
- New Mutants #39 (1986)
- Nick Fury, Agent of S.H.I.E.L.D. vol. 2 #2–10, 13–14 (1989–1990)
- The Official Handbook of the Marvel Universe #2, 4–6, 11–12 (1983)
- The Official Handbook of the Marvel Universe Deluxe Edition #6, 8, 13–20 (1986–1988)
- The Official Handbook of the Marvel Universe Master Edition #1–36 (1990–1993)
- The Official Handbook of the Marvel Universe Update '89 #7 (1989)
- Power Man #30 (1976)
- Pro Action Magazine vol. 2 #3 (Spider-Man) (1994)
- The Rampaging Hulk #5–7 (1977–1978)
- Spider-Man 2099 #36 (1995)
- Thor #228, 281–282, 286–289, 291–308, 310–320, 482 (1974, 1979–1982, 1995)
- Thunderstrike #7, 11 (1994)
- X-Factor #4 (1986)
- X-Men vs. the Avengers #4 (1987)

Preceded by George Pérez	Fantastic Four artist 1978–1979	Succeeded by Sal Buscema
Preceded by Ross Andru	The Amazing Spider-Man artist 1978–1980	Succeeded by John Byrne
Preceded by Wayne Boring	Thor artist 1979–1982	Succeeded by Alan Kupperberg
Preceded by Gil Kane	Green Lantern artist 1982–1983	Succeeded by George Tuska
Preceded by John Buscema	Fantastic Four artist 1988–1989	Succeeded by Rich Buckler
