= Heroes Reborn =

Heroes Reborn may refer to:

- Heroes Reborn (miniseries), a 2015 continuation of the TV series Heroes
- "Heroes Reborn" (1996 comic), a 1996–1997 Marvel Comics crossover story arc
- "Heroes Reborn" (2021 comic), a 2021 Marvel Comics storyline
- Marvel Heroes Reborn, a 1997–2000 Marvel UK comic book series
