= Avengers Unconquered =

UK comic book series

Avengers Unconquered is part of Marvel UK's 'Collectors' Edition' line. It is published by Panini Comics and reprints Marvel Comics from the United States. This title reprints Avengers or Avengers related comics. Each Issue is 76 pages long normally with 3 modern stories reprinted. Avengers Unconquered is sold once every 28 days through Newsagents, although a subscription offer is available. The comic replaced Avengers United which ended in December 2008 with issue #100. The comic retails at £2.95. Avengers Unconquered ended with issue 39 in December 2011 and has been replaced with a new title Avengers Assemble (a different series to the comic of the same name, which has been published in the United States since March 2012).Article body To give context to Avengers: Unconquered since its not as popular as all the other comic series due to its short time on the shelves. Avengers: Unconquered is basically the U.K. reprinting some of Marvels most famous comic series. One of the most popular ones is the Civil War series, known for the comic and the popular movie also.https://comicvine.gamespot.com/avengers-unconquered-1/4000- 255164/References . There were only 39 issues, due to popularity. But, it is also a continuation of the Avengers United series. Then they changed the name again to Avengers Assemble after the end of it in 2011.

== Format ==
The cover for the comic is made out of thick card, unlike US that have a far thinner paper based cover. At certain issue milestones, a special 100 page issue is printed, for the same price as a 76-page issue.

== Content ==
Unlike its predecessor Avengers Unconquered will reprint 100% 'modern' material beginning with a reprint of Civil War. This includes the main 7-part series and select tie-in issues.
