= Avengers United =

Part of Marvel UK's 'Collectors' Edition' line

Avengers United #1 from 2001.

Avengers United is part of Marvel UK's 'Collectors' Edition' line. It is being published by Panini Comics but reprints Marvel Comics from the United States. This title reprints Avengers or Avengers-related comics. Each issue is 76 pages long with two modern stories and one classic story reprinted. Avengers United is sold once every 28 days through Newsagents, although a subscription offer is available. It was first published in June 2001 after Marvel Heroes Reborn closed down. The original cost of the comic was £2.40, although it now retails at £2.50.

== Format ==
The cover for the comic is made out of thick card, unlike the United States, which uses a thinner paper-based cover. At certain issue milestones, a special 100-page issue is printed for the same price as a 76-page issue. These have been #50, #75 and #100. Avengers United has been known to contain more text articles than the other Collectors' Editions that Panini Comics prints in the UK. An example of these are the occasional "Avengers Spotlights"; 2 to 4 page articles highlighting the histories of specific characters. Issue 50 was a 100-page special featuring four stories and an 8-page interview with Edwin Jarvis. The letters page is entitled "Readers Assemble". Avengers United is the only Collectors' Edition to have a letters page in the first issue; this was due to a flood of mail to Panini requesting an Avengers comic after Marvel Heroes Reborn ended.

== Content ==
The first 70 issues of Avengers United reprinted Avengers Vol. 3 #5-#84 (the first 4 issues were reprinted in Marvel Heroes Reborn) as well as many issues of Avengers Vol. 1 as the classic stories. Avengers 75 was a 100-page special which reprinted Avengers #500, and saw the beginning of the "Avengers Disassembled" storyline. As of issue 78, the title began reprinting "New Avengers", although it printed a Young Avengers story arc from issue 81 to issue 83. It has also reprinted issues of Thor and Iron Man as well as all of Avengers Forever, JLA/Avengers and Avengers: Earth's Mightiest Heroes I and II.

December 2006 saw the creation of Avengers United's sister title Marvel Legends.

Avengers United #100 was the title's final issue, but it was replaced by Avengers Unconquered in January 2009.
