= Andrew Wildman =

British artist

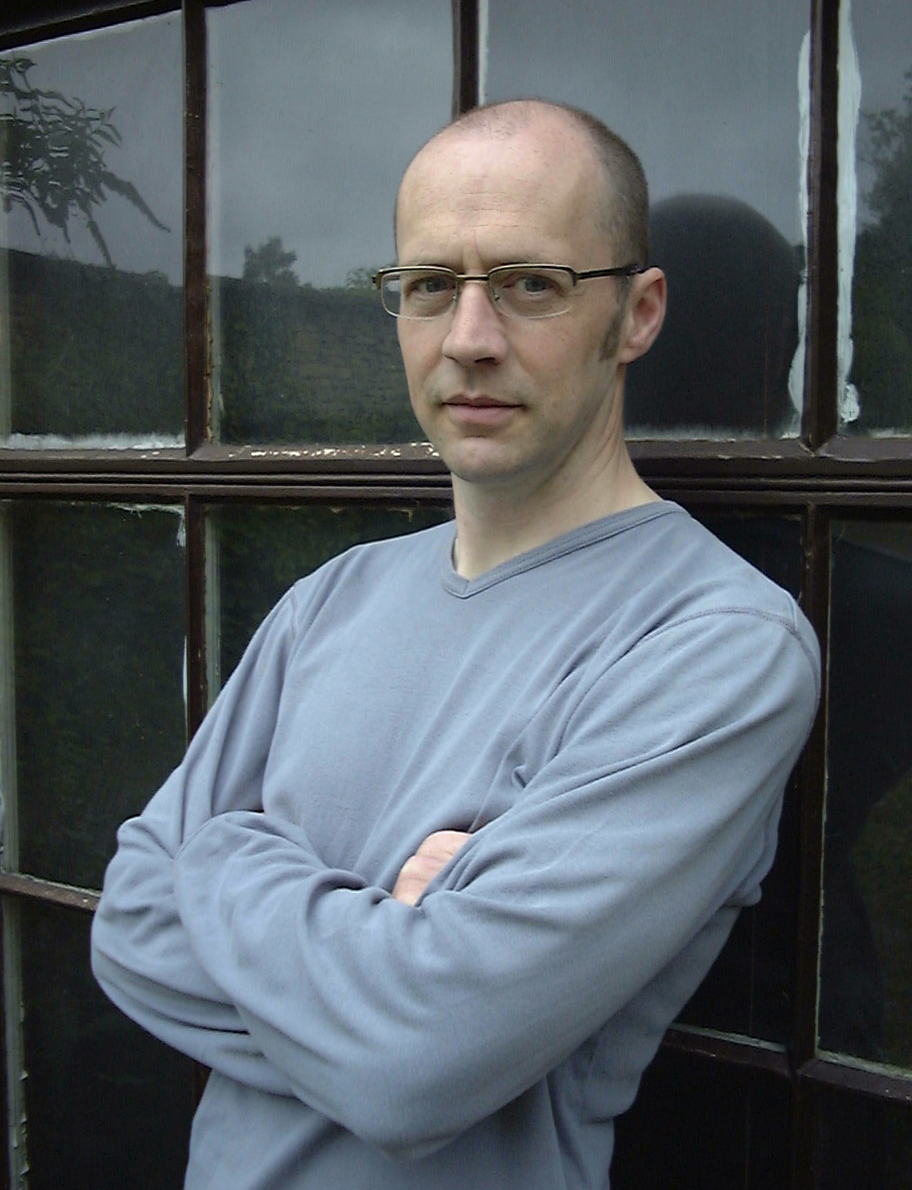
- Area: Artist
- Pseudonym: Andy Wildman

Andrew Wildman (sometimes credited as Andy Wildman) is a British artist, best known for his work in comics, mainly for Marvel Comics.

Wildman worked on numerous Marvel UK's titles in the late 1980s, including Galaxy Rangers, Thundercats, The Real Ghostbusters, and Transformers. His first strip work on Transformers came in #198 for the story "Cold Comfort and Joy". He would rapidly ascend to being one of the key members of the title's art team, often working with inker Stephen Baskerville.

Wildman and Baskerville followed writer Simon Furman to the American Transformers title soon afterwards, providing the art for issues #69–74 and #76–80. His artwork, which often applied human characteristics to the robotic protagonists, was divisive amongst some fans but generally lauded for capturing the emotion of Furman's scripts. After the title was cancelled with #80, he continued to work for Marvel on various series, becoming the regular artist on X-Men Adventures (adaptations of the storylines from the popular 1990s cartoon series) and G.I. Joe: A Real American Hero. He briefly provided art for Transformers: Generation 2, drawing three pages of Transformers: Generation 2 #2 as a favour to Furman and editor Rob Tokar when the original artist, Derek Yaniger, fell behind. Further work for Marvel US included Spider-Man: The Arachnis Project, Venom: Carnage Unleashed (1995) (written by G.I. Joe scribe Larry Hama) and a four issue Black Cat mini-series. His final job for Marvel at the time was as the regular artist for Spider-Man 2099 from #33 to 43.

He returned to the Transformers franchise in 2002, drawing numerous covers for Titan Publishing's series of TPB reprints. This was followed by Wildman working for Dreamwave Productions in 2003 to draw Transformers - The War Within: The Dark Ages, a 6-issue mini-series written by Furman. He also contributed art to Panini's Transformers Armada UK series, for issues #3 to #9; his work for issue #10 went unpublished when the title was cancelled. In 2007, in addition to providing some cover art for IDW, the new publishers of Transformer comics, he provided the artwork for Devil's Due Publishing's G.I. Joe vs. the Transformers IV 2-issue miniseries.

In 2012, Wildman reunited with Furman and inker Stephen Baskerville on a relaunched Transformers ReGeneration One ongoing series, which continues the story and numbering of the original Marvel series. While Wildman was succeeded on interior art by Guido Guidi as of #93, he continued to contribute cover art for the remainder of the series, and illustrated several pages of #100, the final issue.

Wildman and Furman regularly appear at Transformers conventions together including the UK event Auto Assembly and created an online Macromedia Flash comic called The Engine: Industrial Strength with UK New Media expert Adam Jennings.

Draw the World Together logo

Subsequent projects include concept work for computer games development company NikNak, as well as the children's 'Paranormal Western' comic book adventure Frontier with cult writer Jason Cobley.

In 2005 after undertaking the Landmark Education 'Curriculum for Living' Wildman created the charity project Draw the World Together. The project continues to go from strength to strength in partnership with computer games company NCsoft as it raises funds to benefit street children around the world and create healthcare and education possibilities.

Preceded by Dwayne Turner	The Transformers artist 1990–1991	Succeeded by Geoff Senior
Preceded by Geoff Senior	The Transformers artist 1991	Succeeded by
