= Transformers: Armada (comic book) =

American comic book series

- Cover of Transformers: Armada #1. Art by James Raiz and Alan Wang.

Publication information
- Publisher: Dreamwave Productions
- Schedule: Monthly
- Format: Ongoing series
- Genre: Action; Science fiction
- Publication date: July 10, 2002 – December 10, 2003
- No. of issues: 18
- Main character(s): Autobots, Decepticons

Creative team
- Written by: Chris Sarracini; Simon Furman
- Penciller(s): James Raiz; Pat Lee; Guido Guidi; Don Figueroa
- Inker(s): Rob Armstrong, Erik Sander, and Ferd Poblete; Elaine To
- Colorist(s): Alan Wang, Gary Yeung, Ramil Sunga
- Editor: Roger Lee

Collected editions
- First Contact: ISBN 978-0973278613
- Fortress: ISBN 978-0973278644
- Worlds Collide: ISBN 978-0973381740
- Omnibus: ISBN 978-1600107153

Transformers: Armada was an American comic book published by Dreamwave Productions that ran for 18 issues from July 10, 2002, to December 10, 2003. Originally written by Chris Sarracini, writing duties were taken over by veteran Transformers writer Simon Furman, starting with the sixth issue. The comic was based on the Japanese anime series of the same name by Hasbro and Takara Tomy, but is set in its own continuity with an independent storyline.

Hasbro granted the Transformers comics license to Dreamwave in the summer of 2001. After publishing a preview of Transformers: Armada in April 2002, the comic started publication in July, written by Chris Sarracini. During the publication of Armada, Furman was approached by Dreamwave to continue the writing duties, which necessitated him watching all episodes of the anime series that had aired up to that point.

The series received positive reviews from critics, although it was viewed as inferior to Dreamwave's concurrently published series, Transformers: Generation One. Upon its launch, the title was a commercial success, with its first issue being the best-selling comic of July 2002. Sales remained high throughout the first seven issues, with each one scoring in the top 15 of the Diamond Comic Distributors' rankings. However, sales started plummeting after that point and by the end of its run, the title scored out of the top 50.

Transformers: Armada was collected in three trade paperbacks—titled First Contact, Fortress, and Worlds Collide with five, six, and seven issues, respectively—which were published from 2003 to 2004. After IDW Publishing acquired the Transformers licence, the paperbacks were re-released in 2008–2009, and an omnibus collection was published in 2010.

== Publication history ==
=== Background ===
The Transformers franchise was created by American toy company Hasbro, based on the Japanese toylines Diaclone and Micro Change from Takara. Hasbro would partner with Marvel Comics to develop the world and mythology of Transformers, with Marvel also publishing a comic book series that ran for 80 issues, from September 1984 to July 1991. Concurrently with Marvel's comic, a cartoon series titled The Transformers aired from 1984 to 1987.

Following the airing of the cartoon series Beast Wars: Transformers, Beast Machines: Transformers, and Transformers: Robots in Disguise, none of which had any concurrent comics being published, Hasbro would grant the license to Dreamwave Productions in the summer of 2001 to create new Transformers comics. Dreamwave was a Canadian art design studio and comic book publisher founded in 1996 by artist Pat Lee and his brother Roger Lee.

Following the end of Beast Machines, Hasbro and Takara partnered to reboot the franchise and create a new cartoon series and toyline; the Transformers: Armada anime series would start airing on Cartoon Network in 2002. Dreamwave would first publish a Transformers comic in April 2002, with the Transformers Preview one-shot featuring two stories, both written by Chris Sarracini, the latter of which acted as a preview for the Armada comic, and was drawn by James Raiz.

=== Development ===
Starting with issue #6, the series was written by veteran Transformers writer Simon Furman, with Pat Lee tackling coloring duties. Furman, who had previously described Armada as a "solid series", was approached by Dreamwave to take over writing duties for the comic. As he had only seen a rough cut of the anime's first episode at BotCon 2002, he had to catch up with the anime series.

The final story arc in Armada, titled "Worlds Collide", started with issue #14. According to Furman, Armada #13 would act as a lead-in to the story arc, with the Minicons playing a significant role and the revelation they have been withholding information from the Autobots. Furman further described "Worlds Collide" as a "big, epic, [and] world-shattering" storyline that would involve a variety of familiar antagonists.

1. (Simon Furman Interview; about "Worlds Collide" arc)

Following the conclusion of the "World Collide" arc with issue #18 in December 2003, Armada was replaced with Transformers: Energon, which began publication in January 2004 with issue #19, continuing Armada's storyline.

== Reception ==
=== Critical response ===
Tom Speelman of Comic Book Resources praised Dreamwave's comic and described it as superior to the anime series of the same name, highlighting the ability of the Minicons to communicate properly through speech, rather than beeping sound. Randy Lander of TheFourthRail.com gave the first issues a score of 7/10, particularly for its presentation of the characters which "plays up their colorful and cool side". Lander also praised Sarracini's writing for being "action-packed", as well as Raiz's artwork, particularly the designs of Cybertron. Lander also argued that although he found Transformers: Generation One as a better series overall, Armada was better for new readers. Sam Windholz gave the first issue 3.5/5 stars, stating that although there were a few issues with it, issue #1 proved to be a "promising start". Windholz also praised the comic's artwork, especially the depiction of Cybertron. Concerning the writing, Windholz compared it to Generation One, described Armada's writing as simpler and using more exposition. Marc Deschamps of ComicBook.com described Transformers: Armada as one of the "most underrated Transformers stories ever", particularly praising the "Worlds Collide" story arc.

=== Commercial performance ===
Transformers: Armada #1 was the best-selling comic in July 2002, according to Diamond Comic Distributors' ranking for that month, with around 145,567 copies distributed. High sales continued with #2 being the third best-selling comic of the month. Issue #3 was the first one to sell less than 100,000 copies, while #4 was the first one to not rank in the top 10. Sales continued to plummet from that point on. Issue #8 scored out of the top 20, #10 scored out of the top 30, and by #14 the series failed to rank in the top 50. By the end, Transformers: Armada #18 sold 28,059 copies and ranked 70th in Diamond's rankings.

The series' first trade volume, First Contact, had 2,549 units accounted in Diamond distributed comic shops during its release month, April 2003, placing it 22nd on the trade paperbacks chart. The second trade, Fortress, had 1,952 units accounted in September that same year, and place 37th on the chart, while the third and last trade, Worlds Collide, sold 1,358 units in April 2004, scoring 59th place on the charts. The omnibus published by IDW Publishing in August 2010 sold 707 units and scored 132nd on the list.

Transformers: Armada: Physical sales per issue (in thousands)

First Contact
#	Sales	Average	Diamond ranking
1	145,567	104,966	1
2	116,925	104,966	3
3	95,976	104,966	9
4	87,468	104,966	11
5	78,894	104,966	14

Fortress
#	Sales	Average	Diamond ranking
6	72,811	54,377	12
7	73,861	54,377	11
8	49,785	54,377	23
9	46,115	54,377	26
10	43,226	54,377	31
11	40,465	54,377	33

Worlds Collide
#	Sales	Average	Diamond ranking
12	36,974	31,644	38
13	34,821	31,644	53
14	32,416	31,644	54
15	30,683	31,644	59
16	29,947	31,644	79
17	28,608	31,644	71
18	28,059	31,644	70

== Collected editions ==
=== Dreamwave Productions ===
Title	Material collected	Publication date	ISBN
Transformers: Armada Volume 1 – First Contact	Preview and Transformers: Armada #1–5	April 2, 2003	978-0973278613
Transformers: Armada Volume 2 – Fortress	Transformers: Armada #6–11	September 17, 2003	978-0973278644
Transformers: Armada Volume 3 – Worlds Collide	Transformers: Armada #12–18	April 28, 2004	978-0973381740

=== IDW Publishing ===
Title	Material collected	Publication date	ISBN
Transformers: Armada Volume 1	Transformers: Armada #1–5	October 29, 2008	978-1600102677
Transformers: Armada Volume 2	Transformers: Armada #6–11	January 14, 2009	978-1600103575
Transformers: Armada Volume 3	Transformers: Armada #12–18	April 15, 2009	978-1600104022
Transformers: Armada Omnibus	Transformers: Armada #1–18	August 18, 2010	978-1600107153
