= Next of Kin (band) =

British pop rock band

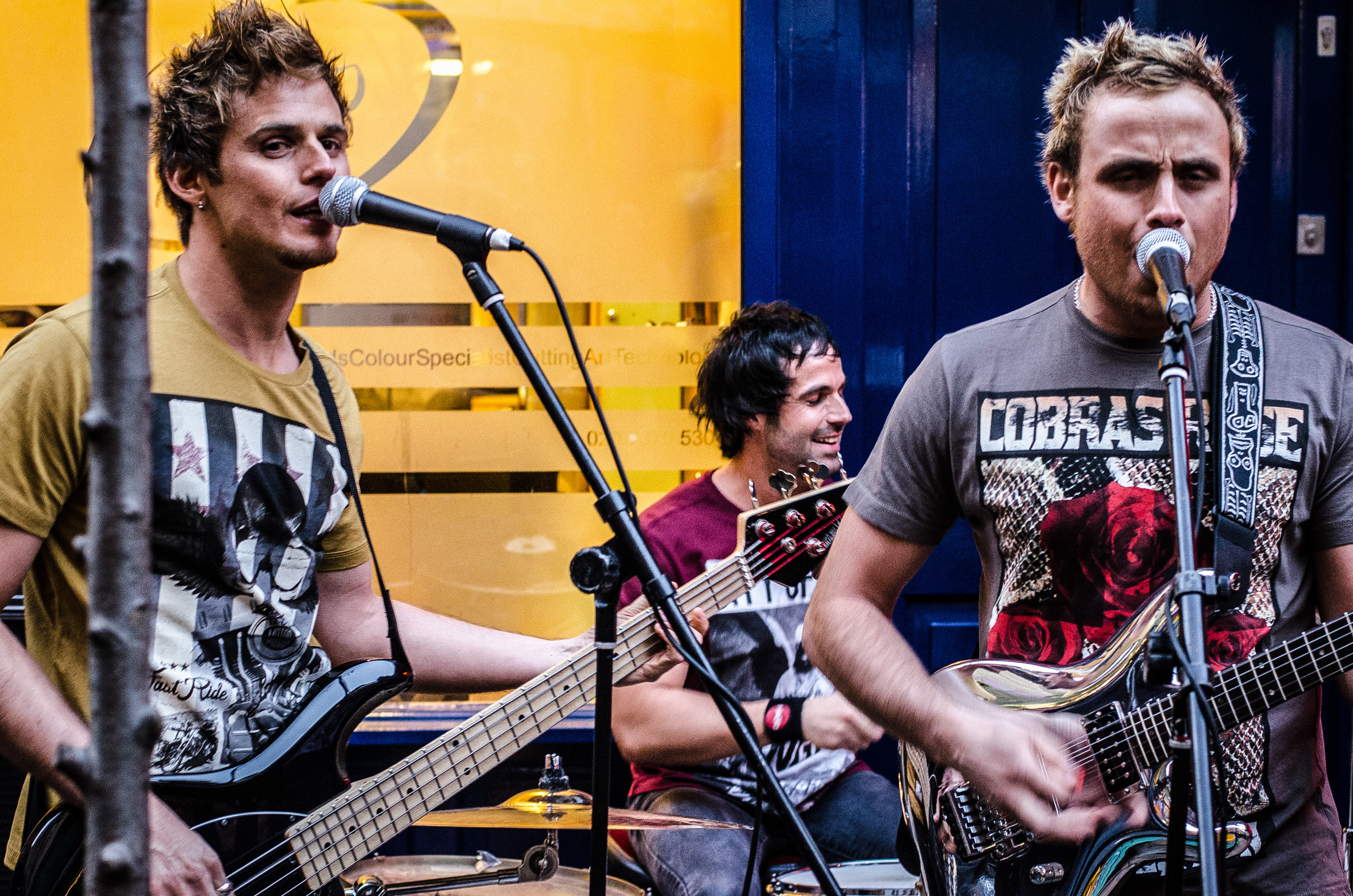
- Next of Kin playing in Neals Yard in London in 2012

Background information
- Origin: Braintree, Essex, England
- Genres: Pop, rock, pop rock
- Years active: 1998–present
- Labels: Universal
- Members: Nathan Bass; Mark Bass; Kieran Bass

Next of Kin are an English pop rock band from Braintree, Essex, composed of brothers Nathan (drums), Mark (guitar) and Kieran Bass (bass guitar).

== History ==
=== Discovery and record deal ===
The band was discovered when the brothers visited the Musical Exchanges music shop in Birmingham, after an event at the nearby NEC had been cancelled. Shop owner Gary Chapman was impressed by Mark's guitar playing and put them in touch with Universal Music. They subsequently signed a record deal with Universal Records.

=== Early career ===
The band performed on the Smash Hits tour in 1998 and supported Boyzone on their UK tour in 1999. Their most notable single was "24 Hours from You", which was co-written by Richard Drummie of Go West, and helped by a promotional video shot in South Africa, and an appearance on the ITV television show Mad for It. It reached #13 on the UK Singles Chart in February 1999. Their follow-up release, "More Love", peaked at #33 in June that year.

At the time of their first single they received comparisons with Hanson, with their ages ranging from 13 to 18 when they broke through in 1999.

=== Later work ===
In 2012, the brothers went to Los Angeles to record with Hollywood actor Stephen Dorff and his composer/producer father Steve Dorff. They recorded an album at NRG Recording Studios, California, with guest musicians John JR Robinson on drums, Leland Sklar on bass, Michael Landau on guitar, George Deoring on acoustic guitar, and Jimmy Nichols on keyboards. The album was never released.

In 2013 they auditioned for the tenth series of The X Factor, but they were cut at Bootcamp.

Since 2020, the band renamed themselves Essex County and now record alternative country music.

== Discography ==
=== Singles ===
- 1999: "24 Hours from You" - Universal Records - UK #13
- 1999: "More Love" - Universal Records - UK #33
- 2001: "Word Of Mouth" - (no label)
