= Marvel Heroes Reborn =

British comic book series

Marvel Heroes Reborn #1 from September 4th 1997

Marvel Heroes Reborn was a British comic book series which was a part of the Marvel UK's 'Collector's Edition' line. It was published by Panini Comics and reprinted Marvel Comics from the United States. The title printed Fantastic Four, Iron Man, the Hulk, and before the series ended Avengers comics. This line began in September 1997, after Panini Comics had successfully published Astonishing Spider-Man, Essential X-Men and Wolverine Unleashed (now Wolverine and Deadpool). The series ended in 2000 at #42, due to an "overcrowded market". The comic was initially priced at £1.99 when it was released, but over the years rose to £2.30. A year later Avengers United took its place on the shelves.

== Format ==
Apart from a special first issue with 92 pages, each issue of Marvel Heroes Reborn hosted two US issues upon its release, with Fantastic Four and Iron Man material being reprinted. From #17 onwards, the comic's logo changed and the format also reduced to 76 pages like all the Collector Editions that exist today. The third slot was taken by the Hulk, up until #39, where the Avengers took that slot. The cover was made out of thick card, unlike the US that has a far thinner paper based cover. The comic contained a letter page which was named "'Nuff Said." Marvel Heroes Reborn was published every 28 days throughout its run.

== Content ==
Marvel Heroes Reborn printed the whole of the Heroes Reborn series for Iron Man and the Fantastic Four. Tie-in #12 of the Avengers and Captain America were reprinted to complete to storyline. When it had finished the run, from #17 the Hulk filled the newly created third slot, and his time reprinted The Incredible Hulk #454-#474. The Fantastic Four and Iron Man saw the third volumes of their ongoing issues get reprinted up to #22 and #19 respectively. From #39, the Avengers had replaced the Hulk, and the Avengers vol 3 #1-#4 saw print. The rest of the series was later reprinted in Avengers United.
