= List of Marvel UK publications =

Marvel UK is a British comic publishing company. It started life as an imprint of Marvel Comics before being bought by Panini Comics in the mid-1990s. The titles include a mix or original stories as well as reprints from Marvel Comics' comic books.

== Titles ==
=== A ===
- The A-team Summer Special
- Abslom Daak - Dalek Killer
- Acorn Green
- Action Force
- Action Force Monthly
- Action Man
- The Adventures of the Galaxy Rangers
- A.L.F. Monthly
- Amazing X-Men
- Astonishing Spider-Man
- Avengers Unconquered
- Avengers United
- Avengers Universe

=== B ===
- Battletide
- Battletide II
- Beavis and Butt-Head
- Beep! Beep!
- Biker Mice From Mars
- Black Axe
- Blake's 7
- Blockbuster
- Bloodseed
- Body Count (comics)

=== C ===
- Captain America
- Captain Britain Weekly
- Children of the Voyager
- The Complete Spider-Man
- Cyberspace 3000

=== D ===
- Dances With Demons
- Daredevil & Captain America: Dead On Arrival
- The Daredevils
- Dark Angel
- Dark Guard
- Death Metal
- Death Wreck
- Death's Head
- Die Cut
- Die Cut vs. G-Force
- Digitek
- Doctor Who Magazine
- Dracula Lives
- Dragon's Claws

=== E ===
- Essential X-Men
- The Exploits of Spider-Man

=== F ===
- Fantastic Four Adventures
- Frantic Magazine

=== G ===
- Gene Dogs
- Genetix
- Glam Metal Detectives
- Gun Runner

=== H ===
- Hell's Angel
- Hulk Comic

=== I ===
- The Incredible Hulks
- Indiana Jones
- Inspector Gadget
- It's Wicked!

=== K ===
- Killpower: The Early Years
- King Arthur and the Knights of Justice
- Knights of Pendragon

=== M ===
- Marvel Action
- Marvel Bumper Comic
- Marvel Heroes
- Marvel Heroes Reborn
- Marvel Legends
- Marvel Rampage
- Marvel Super Adventure
- The Mighty Thor (1983)
- The Mighty World of Marvel
- Mortigan Goth: Immortalis
- Motormouth
- Motormouth & Killpower
- Mys-Tech Wars

=== N ===
- Night Raven: House of Cards

=== O ===
- The Original X-Men
- Overkill

=== P ===
- Planet of the Apes
- Plasmer

=== R ===
- The Real Ghostbusters
- Ren & Stimpy
- Rugrats
- Rupert and Friends
- Rupert Weekly

=== S ===
- Savage Sword of Conan
- Shadow Riders
- Spectacular Spider-Man Adventures
- Spider-Man Comics Weekly
- Star Wars Weekly
- Starburst
- Super Spider-Man and Captain Britain
- Super Soldiers

=== T ===
- Target: 2006
- Thor and the X-Men
- ThunderCats
- Tiny Toon Adventures
- Tom and Jerry
- Top Cat
- The Bog Paper
- The Transformers

=== U ===
- Ultimate Spider-Man
- The Union

=== W ===
- Warheads
- Warheads: Black Dawn
- Wild Thing
- Wolverine and Deadpool
- Wolverine: Saudade

=== Z ===
- Zoids
