= Fantastic Four (comic book) =

Comic book series

- The Fantastic Four #1 (Nov. 1961). Cover art by Jack Kirby.

Publication information
- Publisher: Marvel Comics
- Schedule: Monthly
- Format: Ongoing series
- Genre: Superhero; Science fiction
- Publication date: List: (vol. 1) November 1961 – September 1996 (vol. 2) November 1996 – November 1997 (vol. 3) January 1998 – August 2003 (vol. 1 cont.) September 2003 – December 2009 (FF vol. 1) May – December 2011 (vol. 1 cont. #2) January – December 2012 (vol. 4) January 2013 – March 2014 (FF vol. 2) January 2013 – March 2014 (vol. 5) April 2014 – February 2015 (vol. 1 cont. #3) March – June 2015 (vol. 6) August 2018 – October 2022 (vol. 7) November 2022 – June 2025 (vol. 8) July 2025 – present
- No. of issues: List: (vol. 1): 416 (#1–416) and 27 Annuals (vol. 2): 13 (vol. 3): 70 (vol. 1 cont.): 89 (FF vol. 1): 23 (#1–11 double as vol. 1 #589–599) (vol. 1 cont. #2): 13 (#600–611 plus #605.1) (vol. 4): 17 (#1–16 plus #5AU) (FF vol. 2): 16 (not included in vol. 1 numbering) (vol. 5): 14 (#1–14 and 1 Annual) (vol. 1 cont. #3): 4 (#642–645) (vol. 6): 48 (#1–48) (vol. 7): 33 (#1–33 and 1 Annual) (vol. 8): #1–present

Fantastic Four is the name of several comic book titles featuring the team the Fantastic Four (created by Stan Lee and Jack Kirby) and published by Marvel Comics, beginning with the original Fantastic Four comic book series which debuted in 1961.

As the first superhero team title produced by Marvel Comics, it formed a cornerstone of the company's 1960s rise from a small division of a publishing company to a pop culture conglomerate. The title would go on to showcase the talents of comics creators such as Roy Thomas, John Buscema, John Byrne, Steve Englehart, Walt Simonson, Tom DeFalco, Mark Waid, and Jonathan Hickman. The Fantastic Four is one of several Marvel titles originating in the Silver Age of Comic Books that was continuously published through 2015 before returning to monthly publication in 2018.

== Publication history ==
Magazine and comic book publisher Martin Goodman, a publishing trend-follower, aware of strong sales on Justice League of America, directed his comics editor, Stan Lee, to create a comic-book series about a team of superheroes. According to Lee, writing in 1974, "Martin mentioned that he had noticed one of the titles published by National Comics seemed to be selling better than most. It was a book called The [sic] Justice League of America and it was composed of a team of superheroes. ... 'If the Justice League is selling', spoke he, 'why don't we put out a comic book that features a team of superheroes?'"

=== 1961–1970s ===
The release of The Fantastic Four #1 (Nov. 1961) was an unexpected success. Lee had felt ready to leave the comics field at the time, but the positive response to Fantastic Four persuaded him to stay on. The title began to receive fan mail and Lee started printing the letters in a letter column with issue #3 along with introducing their suits. With the third issue, Lee created the hyperbolic slogan "The Greatest Comic Magazine in the World!!" The following issue, the slogan was changed to "The World's Greatest Comic Magazine!" and became a fixture on the issue covers into the 1990s, and on numerous covers in the 2000s.

Issue #4 (May 1962) reintroduced Namor the Sub-Mariner, an aquatic antihero who was a star character of Marvel's earliest iteration, Timely Comics, during the late 1930s and 1940s period that historians and fans call the Golden Age of Comics. Issue #5 (July 1962) introduced the team's most frequent nemesis, Doctor Doom. These earliest issues were published bimonthly. With issue #16 (July 1963), the cover title dropped its The and became simply Fantastic Four.

Kirby left Marvel in mid-1970, having drawn the first 102 issues plus an unfinished issue, partially published in Fantastic Four #108, with alterations, and later completed and published as Fantastic Four: The Lost Adventure (April 2008), Fantastic Four continued with Lee, Roy Thomas, Gerry Conway and Marv Wolfman as its consecutive regular writers, working with artists such as John Romita Sr., John Buscema, Rich Buckler and George Pérez, with longtime inker Joe Sinnott adding some visual continuity. Jim Steranko also contributed several covers during this time. A short-lived series titled Giant-Size Super-Stars starring the team began in May 1974 and changed its title to Giant-Size Fantastic Four with issue #2. John Byrne joined the title with issue #209 (Aug. 1979), doing pencil breakdowns for Sinnott to finish.

=== 1980s and 1990s ===
Bill Mantlo briefly followed Wolfman as writer of the series and wrote a crossover with Peter Parker, The Spectacular Spider-Man #42 (May 1980). Byrne wrote and drew a giant-sized Fantastic Four promotional comic for Coca-Cola, which was rejected by Coca-Cola as being too violent and published as Fantastic Four #220-221 (July–Aug. 1980) instead. Writer Doug Moench and penciller Bill Sienkiewicz then took over for 10 issues. With issue #232 (July 1981), the aptly titled "Back to the Basics", Byrne began his run as writer, penciller and inker, the last under the pseudonym Bjorn Heyn for this issue only.

Byrne revitalized the slumping title with his run. Originally, Byrne was slated to write with Sienkiewicz providing the art. Sienkiewicz left to do Moon Knight, and Byrne ended up as writer, artist, and inker. Various editors were assigned to the comic; eventually Bob Budiansky became the regular editor. Byrne told Jim Shooter that he could not work with Budiansky, although they ultimately continued to work together. In 2006, Byrne said "that's my paranoia. I look back and I think that was Shooter trying to force me off the book". Byrne left following issue #293 (Aug. 1986) in the middle of a story arc, explaining he could not recapture the fun he had previously had on the series.

Byrne was followed by a quick succession of writers: Roger Stern, Tom DeFalco, and Roy Thomas. Steve Englehart took over as writer for issues 304–333. The title had been struggling, so Englehart decided to make radical changes. He felt the title had become stale with the normal makeup of Reed, Sue, Ben, and Johnny, so in issue #308 Reed and Sue retired and were replaced with the Thing's new girlfriend, Sharon Ventura, and Johnny Storm's former love, Crystal. The changes increased readership through issue #321. At this point, Marvel made decisions about another Englehart comic, West Coast Avengers, that he disagreed with, and in protest he changed his byline to S.F.X. Englehart (S.F.X. is the abbreviation for Simple Sound Effects). In issue #326, Englehart was told to bring Reed and Sue back and undo the other changes he had made. This caused Englehart to take his name entirely off the book. He used the pseudonym John Harkness, which he had created years before for work he did not want to be associated with. According to Englehart, the run from #326 through his last issue, #333, was "one of the most painful stretches of [his] career." Writer-artist Walt Simonson took over as writer with #334 (December 1989), and three issues later began pencilling and inking as well. With brief inking exceptions, two fill-in issues, and a three-issue stint drawn by Arthur Adams, Simonson remained in all three positions through #354 (July 1991).

Simonson, who had been writing the team comic The Avengers, had gotten approval for Reed and Sue to join that team after Engelhart had written them out of Fantastic Four. Yet by The Avengers #300, where they were scheduled to join the team, Simonson was told the characters were returning to Fantastic Four. This led to Simonson quitting The Avengers after that issue. Shortly afterward, he was offered the job of writing Fantastic Four. Having already prepared a number of stories involving the Avengers with Reed and Sue in the lineup, he then rewrote these for Fantastic Four. Simonson later recalled that working on Fantastic Four allowed him the latitude to use original Avengers members Thor and Iron Man, which he had been precluded from using in The Avengers.

After another fill-in, the regular team of writer and Marvel editor-in-chief Tom DeFalco, penciller Paul Ryan and inker Dan Bulanadi took over, with Ryan self-inking beginning with #360 (Jan. 1992). That team, with the very occasional different inker, continued for years through #414 (July 1996). DeFalco nullified the Human Torch's marriage to Alicia Masters by retconning that the alien Skrull empire had kidnapped the real Masters and replaced her with a spy named Lyja. Once discovered, Lyja, who herself had fallen for Storm, helped the Fantastic Four rescue Masters. Ventura departed after being further mutated by Doctor Doom. Although some fans were not pleased with DeFalco's run on Fantastic Four, calling him "The Great Satan", the title's sales increased over the period.

The ongoing series was cancelled with issue #416 (Sept. 1996) and relaunched with (vol. 2) #1 (Nov. 1996) as part of the multi-series "Heroes Reborn" crossover story arc. The yearlong volume retold the team's first adventures in a more contemporary style, and set in a parallel universe. Following the end of that experiment, Fantastic Four was relaunched with (vol. 3) #1 (Jan. 1998). Initially by the team of writer Scott Lobdell and penciller Alan Davis, it went after three issues to writer Chris Claremont (co-writing with Lobdell for #4-5), penciller Salvador Larroca, and inker Art Thibert; this team enjoyed a long run through issue #32 (Aug. 2000), introducing new characters such as Alyssa Moy, Caledonia, and Valeria Richards.

=== 2000s ===
Following the run of Claremont, Lobdell and Larroca, Carlos Pacheco took over as penciller and co-writer, first with Rafael Marín, then with Marín and Jeph Loeb. This series began using dual numbering, as if the original Fantastic Four series had continued unbroken, with issue #42 / #471 (June 2001). At the time, the Marvel Comics series begun in the 1960s, such as Thor and The Amazing Spider-Man, were given such dual numbering on the front cover, with the present-day volume's numbering alongside the numbering from the original series. After issue #70 / #499 (Aug. 2003), the title reverted to its original vol. 1 numbering with issue #500 (Sept. 2003).

Karl Kesel succeeded Loeb as co-writer with issue #51 / #480 (March 2002), and after a few issues with temporary teams, Mark Waid took over as writer with #60 / 489 (October 2002) with artist Mike Wieringo with Marvel releasing a promotional variant edition of their otherwise $2.25 debut issue at the price of nine cents US. Pencillers Mark Buckingham, Casey Jones, and Howard Porter variously contributed through issue #524 (May 2005), with a handful of issues by other teams also during this time. Writer J. Michael Straczynski and penciller Mike McKone did issues #527-541 (July 2005 - Nov. 2006), with Dwayne McDuffie taking over as writer the following issue, and Paul Pelletier succeeding McKone beginning with #544 (May 2007).

As a result of the events of the "Civil War" company-crossover storyline, the Black Panther and Storm temporarily replaced Reed and Susan Richards on the team. During that period, the Fantastic Four also appeared in Black Panther, written by Reginald Hudlin and pencilled primarily by Francis Portela. Beginning with issue #554 (April 2008), writer Mark Millar and penciller Bryan Hitch began what Marvel announced as a sixteen-issue run. Following the summer 2008 crossover storyline, "Secret Invasion", and the 2009 aftermath "Dark Reign", chronicling the U.S. government's assigning of the Nation's security functions to the seemingly reformed supervillain Norman Osborn, the Fantastic Four starred in a five-issue miniseries, Dark Reign: Fantastic Four (May–Sept. 2009), written by Jonathan Hickman, with art by Sean Chen. Hickman took over as the series regular writer as of issue #570 with Dale Eaglesham and later Steve Epting on art.

=== 2010s ===
In the storyline "Three", which concluded in Fantastic Four #587 (cover date March 2011, published January 26, 2011), the Human Torch appears to die while stopping a horde of monsters from the other-dimensional Negative Zone. The series ended with the following issue, #588, and relaunched in March 2011 as simply FF. The relaunch saw the team assume a new name, the Future Foundation, adopt new black-and-white costumes, and accept longtime ally Spider-Man as a member. In October 2011, with the publication of FF #11 (cover-dated Dec. 2011), the Fantastic Four series reached its 599th issue.

In November 2011, to commemorate the 50th anniversary of the Fantastic Four and of Marvel Comics, the company published the 100-page Fantastic Four #600 (cover-dated Jan. 2012), which returned the title to its original numbering and featured the return of the Human Torch. It revealed the fate of the character of Johnny Storm after issue #587, showing that while he did in fact die, he was resurrected to fight as a gladiator for the entertainment of Annihilus. Storm later formed a resistance force called Light Brigade and defeated Annihilus.

As part of Marvel NOW! Fantastic Four ended with #611, ending Jonathan Hickman's long run on FF titles, and the title was relaunched in November 2012 with the creative team of writer Matt Fraction and artist Mark Bagley. In the new title with its numbering starting at #1, the entire Fantastic Four family explore space together, with the hidden intent for Reed Richards to discover why his powers are fading.

Writer James Robinson and artist Leonard Kirk launched a new Fantastic Four series in February 2014 (cover dated April 2014).

Robinson later confirmed that Fantastic Four would be cancelled in 2015 with issue #645, saying that "The book is reverting to its original numbers, and the book is going away for a while. I'm moving towards the end of Fantastic Four. I just want to reassure people that you will not leave this book with a bad taste in your mouth." In the aftermath of the "Secret Wars" storyline, the Thing is working with the Guardians of the Galaxy and the Human Torch is acting as an ambassador with the Inhumans. With Franklin Richards's powers restored and Reed having absorbed the power of the Beyonders from Doom, the Richards' family are working on travelling through and reconstructing the multiverse, but Peter Parker has purchased the Baxter Building to keep it "safe" until the team is ready to come back together.

Writer Dan Slott and artist Sara Pichelli launched a new Fantastic Four series in August 2018 to commemorate the 56th anniversary of the team and part of Marvel's "Fresh Start" relaunch. The new series returned the Invisible Woman, Mister Fantastic, Valeria and Franklin Richards to Earth-616 for the first time since Secret Wars.

=== 2020s ===
A new volume of Fantastic Four was launched in November 2022 by writer Ryan North and artist Iban Coello, after Slott had concluded his run with issue #46.

== Contributors ==
=== Vol. 1 (1961–1996, 2003–2011, 2012, 2015) ===
==== Writers ====
| Years | Writer | Issues |
|---|---|---|
| 1961–1972, 1986 | Stan Lee | #1–115, #120-125, #296, Annual #1-6 |
| 1971–1972, 1977 | Archie Goodwin | #115-118, #182 |
| 1972-1973, 1975-1977, 1987, 1989 | Roy Thomas | #119, #126-133, #136-137, #156-171, #173-179, #181, #303, Annual #11, #22 |
| 1973-1974, 1977 | Gerry Conway | #133-152, #179, Giant-Size Super-Stars #1, Giant-Size Fantastic Four #2-3 |
| 1974, 1977-1980 | Marv Wolfman | #190, #195-217, Annual #12, #14, Giant-Size Fantastic Four #3 |
| 1974 | Tony Isabella | #153 |
| 1975, 1977-1978 | Len Wein | #154-157, #182-188, #191-194, Giant-Size Fantastic Four #4 |
| 1975 | Chris Claremont | Giant-Size Fantastic Four #4 |
| 1976-1980 | Bill Mantlo | #172, #182-183, #193-194, #216-218, Annual #13 |
| 1976 | Mike Friedrich | #177 |
| 1977 | Reprint of Fantastic Four #101 | #180 |
| 1977, 1986 | Jim Shooter | #182-183, #296 |
| 1977, 1986-1987 | Roger Stern | #183, #294-295, #297-302 |
| 1977 | Ralph Macchio | #183 |
| 1977 | Roger Slifer | #183 |
| 1977 | Reprint of Fantastic Four Annual #4 (first story) | #189 |
| 1978 | Keith Pollard | #193-194 |
| 1980-1981 | Doug Moench | #219, #222-231, Annual #15 |
| 1981 | Ed Hannigan | Annual #16 |
| 1980-1986 | John Byrne | #220-221, #232-294, Annual 17-19 |
| 1987, 1991-1996, 2015 | Tom DeFalco | #301-302, #356-393, #395-416, #645, Annual #26 |
| 1987-1989 | Steve Englehart | #304-328, Annual #20-21; #329-333 (as John Harkness) |
| 1989-1991 | Walt Simonson | #334-341, #343-350, #352-354, Annual #23 |
| 1990-1994 | Len Kaminski | #351; Annual #23-24, #26-27 |
| 1990 | Bob Harras | Annual #23 |
| 1990-1991 | Danny Fingeroth | #342, #355 |
| 1991 | Al Milgrom | Annual #24 |
| 1992-1994 | Mark Gruenwald | Annual #25, #27 |
| 1994 | Mike Lackey | #388, #390, #394 |
| 2003-2005 | Mark Waid | #500-524 |
| 2004-2005, 2015 | Karl Kesel | #514-516, #525-526, #645 (second back-up) |
| 2005-2006 | J. Michael Straczynski | #527-541 |
| 2007-2008 | Dwayne McDuffie | #542-553 |
| 2008-2009 | Mark Millar | #554-569 |
| 2009-2010 | Joe Ahearne | #568-569, Annual #32 |
| 2009-2011, 2012 | Jonathan Hickman | #570-588, #600-611, #605.1 |
| 2015 | James Robinson | #642-645 |
| 2015 | Louise Simonson | #645 (third back-up) |
| 2015 | Jeff Parker | #645 (fifth back-up) |

==== Pencilers ====
| Years | Penciler | Issues |
|---|---|---|
| 1961–1971 | Jack Kirby | #1–102, #108, Annual #1-6 |
| 1970-1971 | John Romita Sr. | #103-106, #108 |
| 1971-1976, 1979, 1986-1987 | John Buscema | #107-130, #132, #134-141, #160, #173-175, #202, #296-309, Annual #11; Giant-Size Fantastic Four #2, #4 |
| 1973-1974 | Ross Andru | #131, #145-146 |
| 1973 | Ramona Fradon | #133 |
| 1974-1976, 1989 | Rich Buckler | #142-144, #147-153, #155-159, #161-163, #168-169, #171, #325, #329-335, Annual #22, Giant-Size Super-Stars #1, Giant-Size Fantastic Four #3 |
| 1975 | Bob Brown | #154 |
| 1975-1980 | George Pérez | #164-167, #170, #172, #176-178, #184-188, #191-192, Annual #14-15 |
| 1977 | Ron Wilson | #178-179, #181 |
| 1977 | Reprint of Fantastic Four #101 | #180 |
| 1977-1979, 1988 | Sal Buscema | #182-183, #190, #207-208, #313, Annual #13 |
| 1977 | Reprint of Fantastic Four Annual #4 (first story) | #189 |
| 1977 | Bob Hall | Annual #12 |
| 1977-1979, 1988-1989 | Keith Pollard | #193-201, #203-206, #310-312, #314-320, #322-324, #326-328, Annual #12 |
| 1979-1986 | John Byrne | #209-218, #220-221, #232-293, Annual #17, #19 |
| 1980 | Tom Sutton | Annual #15 |
| 1980-1981 | Bill Sienkiewicz | #219, #222-231 |
| 1981 | Jerome Moore | #231 |
| 1981 | Steve Ditko | Annual #16 |
| 1984 | Mark Bright | Annual #18 |
| 1984, 1986 | Kerry Gammill | #266, #296 |
| 1986 | Jackson Guice | #286 |
| 1986 | Jerry Ordway | #294-296 |
| 1986 | Barry Windsor-Smith | #296 |
| 1986 | Ron Frenz | #296 |
| 1986, 1991 | Al Milgrom | #296, #355, Annual #24 |
| 1986 | Marc Silvestri | #296 |
| 1987 | Paul Neary | Annual #20 |
| 1988 | Kieron Dwyer | Annual #21 |
| 1988-1990 | Ron Lim | #321, #336 |
| 1990-1991 | Walt Simonson | #337-341, #343-346, #350, #352-354 |
| 1990 | Rex Valve | #342 |
| 1990 | Jackson Guice | Annual #23 |
| 1990-1991 | Arthur Adams | #347-349, #358 |
| 1991 | Gracine Tanka | #348-349 |
| 1991 | Mark Bagley | #351 |
| 1991-1996 | Paul Ryan | #356-414 |
| 1996 | Carlos Pacheco | #415-416 |
| 2003-2005 | Mike Wieringo | #500, #509-513, #517-524 |
| 2003 | Casey Jones | #501-502 |
| 2003-2004 | Howard Porter | #503-508 |
| 2004 | Paco Medina | #514-516 |
| 2005 | Tom Grummett | #525-526 |
| 2005-2007 | Mike McKone | #527-543 |
| 2007-2008 | Paul Pelletier | #544-553 |
| 2008-2010 | Bryan Hitch | #554-568, Annual #32 |
| 2009 | Stuart Immonen | #569 |
| 2009-2010 | Dale Eaglesham | #570-572, #575-578 |
| 2010 | Neil Edwards | #573-574, #579-582 |
| 2010-2012 | Steve Epting | #583-587, #600-601, #604 |
| 2011 | Nick Dragotta | #588 |
| 2011 | Mark Brooks | #588 |
| 2012 | Barry Kitson | #602-603 |
| 2012 | Ron Garney | #605-606 |
| 2012 | Michael Choi | #605.1 |
| 2012 | Giuseppe Camuncoli | #607-608 |
| 2012 | Ryan Stegman | #609-611 |
| 2015 | Leonard Kirk | #642-645 |

=== Vol. 2 (1996–1997) ===
==== Writers ====
| Years | Writer | Issues |
|---|---|---|
| 1996-1997 | Jim Lee | #1-12 |
| 1996-1997 | Brandon Choi | #1-12 |
| 1997 | Scott Lobdell | #6 (prologue) |
| 1997 | James Robinson | #13 |

==== Pencilers ====
| Years | Penciler | Issues |
|---|---|---|
| 1996-1997 | Jim Lee | #1-12 |
| 1997 | Brett Booth | #6-9, 11-12 |
| 1997 | Ron Lim | #10-12 |
| 1997 | Mike Wieringo | #13 |

=== Vol. 3 (1998–2003) ===
==== Writers ====
| Years | Writer | Issues |
|---|---|---|
| 1998 | Ralph Macchio | #1/2 |
| 1998 | Scott Lobdell | #1-5 |
| 1998-2000 | Chris Claremont | #4-32 |
| 2000 | John Francis Moore | #33-34 |
| 2000-2002 | Carlos Pacheco | #35-54 |
| 2000-2002 | Rafael Marín | #35-54 |
| 2001-2002 | Jeph Loeb | #38-50 |
| 2002 | Fabian Nicieza | #50 (third back-up) |
| 2002 | Erik Ko | #50 (fourth back-up) |
| 2002 | Ken Siu-Chong | #50 (fourth back-up) |
| 2002 | Karl Kesel | #51-56 |
| 2002 | Adam Warren | #57-59 |
| 2002-2003 | Mark Waid | #60-70 |

==== Pencilers ====
| Years | Penciler | Issues |
|---|---|---|
| 1998 | Ron Lim | #1/2 |
| 1998 | Alan Davis | #1-3 |
| 1998-2000 | Salvador Larroca | #4-34 |
| 1998 | Anthony Williams | #12 |
| 2000-2002 | Carlos Pacheco | #35-41, #44, #47, #49-50 |
| 2001 | Stuart Immonen | #42 |
| 2001 | Joe Bennett | #43 |
| 2001 | Jeff Johnson | #45-46, #48 |
| 2002 | Tom Grummett | #50 |
| 2002 | Steve Rude | #50 (third back-up) |
| 2002 | Alvin Lee | #50 (fourth back-up) |
| 2002 | Mark Bagley | #51-54 |
| 2002 | Stuart Immonen | #55-56 |
| 2002 | Keron Grant | #57-59 |
| 2002-2003 | Mike Wieringo | #60-64, #67-70 |
| 2003 | Mark Buckingham | #65-66 |

=== Vol. 4 (2013–2014) ===
==== Writers ====
| Years | Writer | Issues |
|---|---|---|
| 2013-2014 | Matt Fraction | #1-16, #5AU |
| 2013 | Christopher Sabela | #11-12 |
| 2013-2014 | Karl Kesel | #13-16 |
| 2014 | Lee Allred | #16 |

==== Pencilers ====
| Years | Penciler | Issues |
|---|---|---|
| 2013 | Mark Bagley | #1-13 |
| 2013 | André Lima Araújo | #5AU |
| 2014 | Raffaele Ienco | #14-16 |
| 2013-2014 | Joe Quinones | #16 |

=== Vol. 5 (2014–2015) ===
==== Writers ====
| Years | Writer | Issues |
|---|---|---|
| 2014-2015 | James Robinson | #1-14 |

==== Pencilers ====
| Years | Penciler | Issues |
|---|---|---|
| 2014-2015 | Leonard Kirk | #1-8, #11-14 |
| 2014 | Marc Laming | #9-10 |

=== Vol. 6 (2018–2022) ===
==== Writers ====
| Years | Writer | Issues |
|---|---|---|
| 2018-2022 | Dan Slott | #1-46 |
| 2022 | David Pepose | #47-48 |

==== Pencilers ====
| Years | Penciler | Issues |
|---|---|---|
| 2018-2019 | Sara Pichelli | #1-3 |
| 2018-2019, 2021 | Nico Leon | #3-4, #36-37 |
| 2019 | Stefano Caselli | #4, #8-9 |
| 2019 | Aaron Kuder | #5-9 |
| 2019 | John Lucas | #7 |
| 2019 | David Marquez | #8 |
| 2019 | Reilly Brown | #8 |
| 2019-2020 | Paco Medina | #9-11, #14-15, #18-25 |
| 2019 | Kevin Libranda | #10-11 |
| 2019 | Paolo Villanelli | #11 |
| 2019, 2021 | Juanan Ramírez | #11, 27 |
| 2019-2020 | Sean Izaakse | #12-13, #16-17, #21-22 |
| 2019-2020 | Bob Quinn | #15, #17 |
| 2020 | Luciano Vecchio | #17 |
| 2020 | Carlos Magno | #17-18 |
| 2020, 2022 | Francesco Manna | #18, #38-39 |
| 2020-2021 | R.B. Silva | #25-28, #31-34 |
| 2020 | Will Robson | #25 |
| 2021 | Ze Carlos | #27, #29-30 |
| 2021 | John Romita Jr. | #35 |
| 2022 | Rachael Stott | #40-44 |
| 2022 | Andrea Di Vito | #43-44 |
| 2022 | Davide Tinto | #44 |
| 2022 | Farid Karami | #45 |
| 2022 | Carlos Urbano | #46 |
| 2022 | Juan Cabal | #47-48 |

=== Vol. 7 (2023–2025) ===
==== Writers ====
| Years | Writer | Issues |
|---|---|---|
| 2023-2025 | Ryan North | #1-33 |

==== Pencilers ====
| Years | Penciler | Issues |
|---|---|---|
| 2023 | Iban Coello | #1-4, #7, #11-13 |
| 2023-2024 | Ivan Fiorelli | #5-6, #8-9, #14-15, #21-22, #26 |
| 2023 | Leandro Fernandez | #10 |
| 2024 | Francesco Mortarino | #16 |
| 2024 | Carlos Gómez | #17-20, #23-25 |
| 2024-2025 | Steven Cummings | #27-28 |
| 2025 | Cory Smith | #29-33 |

=== Vol. 8 (2025–present) ===
==== Writers ====
| Years | Writer | Issues |
|---|---|---|
| 2025-present | Ryan North | #1-present |

==== Pencilers ====
| Years | Penciler | Issues |
|---|---|---|
| 2025-2026 | Humberto Ramos | #1-10, #15 |
| 2026 | Patrick Boutin | #11-12 |
| 2026 | Andrea Sorrentino | #13 |
| 2026 | Ramon Rosanas | #14, #16 |

== Cultural impact ==
The first issue of The Fantastic Four proved a success, igniting a new direction for superhero comics and soon influencing many other superhero comics. Readers grew fond of Ben's grumpiness, Johnny's tendency to annoy others and Reed and Sue's spats. Stan Lee was surprised at the reaction to the first issue, leading him to stay in the comics field despite previous plans to leave. Comics historian Stephen Krensky said that "Lee's natural dialogue and flawed characters appealed to 1960s kids looking to 'get real'".

As of 2005, 150 million comics featuring the Fantastic Four had been sold.

== Collected editions ==
The Fantastic Four stories have been collected into several trade paperback and hardcover editions.

As part of the Essential Marvel range:

| Title | Years covered | Material collected | Pages | Publication date | ISBN |
|---|---|---|---|---|---|
| The Fantastic Four, Vol. 1 | 1961–1963 | The Fantastic Four #1–20, Annual #1 | 544 | November 1998 | 978-0785106661 |
| The Fantastic Four, Vol. 2 | 1963–1965 | The Fantastic Four #21–40, Annual #2; Strange Tales Annual #2 | 528 | October 1999 | 978-0785107316 |
| The Fantastic Four, Vol. 3 | 1965–1967 | The Fantastic Four #41–63, Annual #3–4 | 536 | August 2001 | 978-0785126256 |
| The Fantastic Four, Vol. 4 | 1967–1968 | The Fantastic Four #64–83, Annual #5–6 | 536 | June 2005 | 978-0785114840 |
| The Fantastic Four, Vol. 5 | 1969–1971 | The Fantastic Four #84–110, Annual #7–8 | 568 | June 2006 | 978-0785121626 |
| The Fantastic Four, Vol. 6 | 1971–1973 | The Fantastic Four #111–137 | 592 | May 2007 | 978-0785126973 |
| The Fantastic Four, Vol. 7 | 1973–1975 | The Fantastic Four #138–159; Giant-Size Super-Stars #1; Giant-Size Fantastic Four #2–4; Avengers #127 | 560 | July 2008 | 978-0785130635 |
| The Fantastic Four, Vol. 8 | 1975–1977 | The Fantastic Four #160–179, 181–183, Annual #11; Marvel Two-in-One #20, Annual #1 | 520 | May 2010 | 978-0785145387 |
| The Fantastic Four, Vol. 9 | 1977–1979 | The Fantastic Four #184–188, 190–207, Annual #12–13 | 512 | July 2013 | 978-0-7851-8410-2 |

As part of the Marvel Masterworks series:

| # | Title | Material collected | Pages | First edition | Second edition | ISBN |
|---|---|---|---|---|---|---|
Hardcovers
| 2 | The Fantastic Four: Vol. 1 | The Fantastic Four #1–10 | 256 | November 1987 | June 2003 | 978-0785111818 |
| 6 | The Fantastic Four: Vol. 2 | The Fantastic Four #11–20, Annual #1 | 295 | October 1988 | July 2003 | 978-0785109808 |
| 13 | The Fantastic Four: Vol. 3 | The Fantastic Four #21–30 | 234 | September 1990 | September 2003 | 978-0871356291 |
| 15 | The Silver Surfer: Vol. 1 | The Silver Surfer #1–6; The Fantastic Four Annual #5 | 260 | June 1991 | June 2003 | 978-0785131137 |
| 21 | The Fantastic Four: Vol. 4 | The Fantastic Four #31–40, Annual #2 | 264 | November 1992 | November 2003 | 978-0785111832 |
| 25 | The Fantastic Four: Vol. 5 | The Fantastic Four #41–50, Annual #3 | 240 | October 1993 | January 2004 | 978-0785111849 |
| 28 | The Fantastic Four: Vol. 6 | The Fantastic Four #51–60, Annual #4 | 240 | October 2000 | March 2004 | 978-0785112662 |
| 34 | The Fantastic Four: Vol. 7 | The Fantastic Four #61–71, Annual #5 | 304 | August 2004 | N/A | 978-0785115847 |
| 42 | The Fantastic Four: Vol. 8 | The Fantastic Four #72–81, Annual #6 | 272 | March 2005 | N/A | 978-0785116943 |
| 53 | The Fantastic Four: Vol. 9 | The Fantastic Four #82–93, Annual #7 | 272 | November 2005 | N/A | 978-0785118466 |
| 62 | The Fantastic Four: Vol. 10 | The Fantastic Four #94–104 | 272 | May 2006 | N/A | 978-0785120612 |
| 103 | The Fantastic Four: Vol. 11 | The Fantastic Four #105–116 | 272 | September 2008 | N/A | 978-0785130468 |
| 132 | The Fantastic Four: Vol. 12 | The Fantastic Four #117–128 | 272 | February 2010 | N/A | 978-0785142188 |
| 169 | The Fantastic Four: Vol. 13 | The Fantastic Four #129–141 | 288 | November 9, 2011 | N/A | 978-0-7851-5040-4 |
| 188 | The Fantastic Four: Vol. 14 | The Fantastic Four #142–150, Giant-Size Super-Stars #1, Giant-Size Fantastic Four #2, The Avengers #127 | 272 | November 14, 2012 | N/A | 978-0-7851-5963-6 |
| 197 | The Fantastic Four: Vol. 15 | The Fantastic Four #151–163 | 312 | August 21, 2013 | N/A | 978-0785166252 |
| 210 | The Fantastic Four: Vol. 16 | Fantastic Four #164–175, Fantastic Four Annual #11, Marvel Two-In-One #20, Marvel Two-In-One Annual #1 | 328 | September 9, 2014 | N/A | 978-0-7851-8845-2 |
| 220 | The Fantastic Four: Vol. 17 | Fantastic Four #176–191 | 272 | June 10, 2015 | N/A | 978-0-7851-9192-6 |
| 236 | The Fantastic Four: Vol. 18 | Fantastic Four #192–203, Fantastic Four Annual #12–13 | 328 | September 14, 2016 | N/A | 978-1-302-90009-0 |
| 253 | The Fantastic Four: Vol. 19 | Fantastic Four #204–218, Fantastic Four Annual #14 | 328 | December 15, 2017 | N/A | 978-1-302-90347-3 |
| 264 | The Fantastic Four: Vol. 20 | Fantastic Four #219–231, Fantastic Four Annual #15 | 320 | September 12, 2018 | N/A | 978-1-302-91027-3 |
Trade paperbacks
| | The Fantastic Four: Vol. 1 | The Fantastic Four #1–10 | 256 | March 2009 | N/A | 978-0785137108 |
| | The Fantastic Four: Vol. 2 | The Fantastic Four #11–20, Annual #1 | 295 | July 2009 | N/A | 978-0785137122 |
| | The Fantastic Four: Vol. 3 | The Fantastic Four #21–30 | 234 | February 2010 | N/A | 978-0785142966 |
| | The Fantastic Four: Vol. 4 | The Fantastic Four #31–40, Annual #2 | 264 | October 2010 | N/A | 978-0785145660 |
| | The Fantastic Four: Vol. 5 | The Fantastic Four #41–50, Annual #3 | 240 | February 2011 | N/A | 978-0785150589 |
| | The Fantastic Four: Vol. 6 | The Fantastic Four #51–60, Annual #4 | 240 | May 2011 | N/A | 978-0785150602 |
| | The Fantastic Four: Vol. 7 | The Fantastic Four #61–71, Annual #5 | 304 | November 2011 | N/A | 978-0785150626 |
| | The Fantastic Four: Vol. 8 | The Fantastic Four #72–81, Annual #6 | 272 | August 2012 | N/A | 978-0785162940 |
| | The Fantastic Four: Vol. 9 | The Fantastic Four #82–93, Annual #7 | 272 | June 2013 | N/A | 978-0785167600 |
| | The Fantastic Four: Vol. 10 | The Fantastic Four #94–104 | 272 | Apr 2014 | N/A | 978-0785120612 |

=== Fantastic Four Volume 1 ===
| Title | Material collected | Writer | Publication date | ISBN |
|---|---|---|---|---|
| Origins of Marvel Comics | Fantastic Four vol. 1 #1 and #55 | Stan Lee | September 1974 | 978-0671218638 |
| Marvel Comics' The Fantastic Four | Fantastic Four vol. 1 #1–6 | Stan Lee | November 1977 | 0-671-81445-1 |
| The Fantastic Four | Fantastic Four #4, 48–50, and #87 | Stan Lee | September 1979 | 978-0671248123 |
| Bring on the Bad Guys: Origins of the Marvel Comics Villains | Fantastic Four #5 and Fantastic Four Annual #2 | Stan Lee | October 1976 | 978-0671223557 |
| The Superhero Women: Featuring the Fabulous Females of Marvel Comics | Fantastic Four #22 | Stan Lee | November 1977 | 978-0671229283 |
| Marvel's Greatest Superhero Battles | Fantastic Four #25–26 | Stan Lee | November 1978 | 978-0671243913 |
| Inhumans: The Origin of the Inhumans | Fantastic Four #36, 38–47, 62–65, Annual #5 and material from #48, 50, 52, 54–61 | Stan Lee | October 2013 | 978-0785184973 |
| Fantastic Four: Behold... Galactus! | Fantastic Four (1961) #48-50, #74-77, #120-123 and #242-244 | Stan Lee, John Byrne | 1989 | 978-1302917937 |
| Fantastic Four Visionaries: George Pérez, Vol. 1 | Fantastic Four #164–167, 170, 176–178, 184–186 | Roy Thomas, Len Wein | June 2005 | 978-0785117254 |
| Fantastic Four: Crusaders & Titans | Fantastic Four #164–176 | Roy Thomas, Len Wein | June 2005 | 978-0785184362 |
| Fantastic Four Visionaries: George Pérez, Vol. 2 | Fantastic Four #187–188, 191–192, Annual #14–15; Marvel Two-in-One #60; Adventures of the Thing #3 | Len Wein, Marv Wolfman | April 2006 | 978-0785120605 |
| Fantastic Four: Reunited They Stand | Fantastic Four #201–203, Annual #12–14 | Marv Wolfman | February 2013 | 978-0785162865 |
| Nova Classic, Vol. 3 | Fantastic Four #204–206, 208–214, Nova #20–25 | Marv Wolfman, Bill Mantlo | April 2014 | 978-0785185529 |
| Fantastic Four Visionaries: John Byrne, Vol. 0 | Fantastic Four #215–218, 220–221; Marvel Team-Up #61–62; Marvel Two-in-One #50 | Marv Wolfman, Bill Mantlo, Chris Claremont, John Byrne | January 2009 | 978-0785137610 |
| Fantastic Four Visionaries: John Byrne, Vol. 1 | Fantastic Four #232–240 | John Byrne | November 2001 | 978-0785142706 |
| Fantastic Four Visionaries: John Byrne, Vol. 2 | Fantastic Four #241–250 | John Byrne | May 2004 | 978-0785114642 |
| Fantastic Four: Trial of Galactus | Fantastic Four #242–244, 257–262; What the--?! #2 | John Byrne | September 1990 | 978-0871355751 |
| Fantastic Four Visionaries: John Byrne, Vol. 3 | Fantastic Four #251–257, Annual #17; Avengers #233; Thing #2 | John Byrne | January 2005 | 978-0785116790 |
| Fantastic Four Visionaries: John Byrne, Vol. 4 | Fantastic Four #258–267; Alpha Flight #4; Thing #10 | John Byrne | March 2005 | 978-0785117100 |
| Fantastic Four Visionaries: John Byrne, Vol. 5 | Fantastic Four #268–275, Annual #18; Thing #19 | John Byrne | December 2005 | 978-0785118442 |
| Fantastic Four Visionaries: John Byrne, Vol. 6 | Fantastic Four #276–284; Secret Wars II #2; Thing #23 | John Byrne | September 2006 | 978-0785121909 |
| Fantastic Four Visionaries: John Byrne, Vol. 7 | Fantastic Four #285–286, Annual #19; Avengers #263, Annual #14; X-Factor #1 | John Byrne | June 2007 | 978-0785127352 |
| Fantastic Four Visionaries: John Byrne, Vol. 8 | Fantastic Four #287–295 | John Byrne | December 2007 | 978-0785127369 |
| Fantastic Four Visionaries: Walt Simonson, Vol. 1 | Fantastic Four #334–341 | Walt Simonson | May 2007 | 978-0785127581 |
| Fantastic Four Visionaries: Walt Simonson, Vol. 2 | Fantastic Four #342–346 | Walt Simonson | August 2008 | 978-0785131304 |
| Fantastic Four Visionaries: Walt Simonson, Vol. 3 | Fantastic Four #347–350, 352–354 | Walt Simonson | November 2009 | 978-0785137511 |
| Fantastic Four: Monsters Unleashed | Fantastic Four #347–349 | Walt Simonson | January 1992 | 978-0871358776 |
| Fantastic Four: Nobody Gets Out Alive | Fantastic Four #387–392 | Tom DeFalco | February 1995 | 978-0785100638 |
| Fantastic Four/Inhumans: Atlantis Rising | Fantastic Four #401–402, Namor the Sub-Mariner #60–62, Fantastic Four: Atlantis Rising #1–2, Fantastic Force #8–9, Fantastic Four Unlimited #11 | Tom DeFalco | January 2014 | 978-0785185482 |
| X-Men: The Complete Onslaught Epic Vol 2 | Fantastic Four #415; X-Factor #125–126, Generation X #18, Wolverine #104, X-Men #55, Uncanny X-Men #336, Cable #35, and X-Force #58 | Tom DeFalco | June 2008 | 978-0785128243 |
| X-Men: The Complete Onslaught Epic Vol 3 | Fantastic Four #416; Hulk #445, Iron Man #332, Avengers #402, Punisher #11, X-Man #19, Amazing Spider-Man #415, Green Goblin #12, Spider-Man #72 | Tom DeFalco | August 2008 | 978-0785128250 |

=== Fantastic Four Volume 2 ===
| Title | Material collected | Writer | Publication date | ISBN |
|---|---|---|---|---|
| Fantastic Four: Heroes Reborn | Fantastic Four (vol. 2) #1-6 | Brandon Choi, Jim Lee | July 2000 | 978-0785107446 |
| Heroes Reborn: Fantastic Four | Fantastic Four (vol. 2) #1-12 | Brandon Choi, Jim Lee, Brett Booth, Ron Lim | 2006 | 978-0785123361 |

=== Fantastic Four Volume 3 ===
The issue numbering of Volume 3 reverted to the legacy number of the title, beginning with the issue #500.

| Title | Material collected | Writer | Publication date | ISBN |
|---|---|---|---|---|
| Fantastic Four: Heroes Return | Fantastic Four (vol. 3) #1–4 | Scott Lobdell, Chris Claremont | March 2000 | 978-0785107217 |
| Fantastic Four: Heroes Return - The Complete Collection Vol.1 | Fantastic Four (vol. 3) #1–15, 1/2; Fantastic Four Annual '98; Iron Man (vol. 3) #14 | Scott Lobdell, Chris Claremont | March 2019 | 978-1302916237 |
| Fantastic Four: Heroes Return - The Complete Collection Vol.2 | Fantastic Four (vol. 3) #16-32; Fantastic Four Annuals 1999-2000 | Chris Claremont, Louise Simonson, Salvador Larocca | March 2020 | 978-1302916237 |
| Fantastic Four: Flesh and Stone | Fantastic Four (vol. 3) #35–39 | Jeph Loeb, Rafael Marin, Carlos Pacheco | November 2000 | 978-0785107934 |
| Fantastic Four: Into the Breach | Fantastic Four (vol. 3) #40–44 | Jeph Loeb, Rafael Marin, Carlos Pacheco | January 2002 | 978-0785108658 |
| Fantastic Four/Inhumans | Fantastic Four (vol. 3) #51–54; Inhumans (vol. 3) #1–4 | Karl Kesel, Rafael Marin, Carlos Pacheco | 2007 | 978-0785127031 |
| Fantastic Four, Vol. 1: Imaginauts | Fantastic Four (vol. 3) #56, 60–66 | Mark Waid | April 2003 | 978-0785110637 |
| Fantastic Four, Vol. 2: Unthinkable | Fantastic Four (vol. 3) #67–70, 500–502 | Mark Waid | December 2003 | 978-0785111115 |
| Fantastic Four, Vol. 3: Authoritative Action | Fantastic Four #503–508 | Mark Waid | December 2003 | 978-0785111986 |
| Fantastic Four, Vol. 4: Hereafter | Fantastic Four #509–513 | Mark Waid | August 2004 | 978-0785115267 |
| Fantastic Four, Vol. 5: Disassembled | Fantastic Four #514–519 | Mark Waid | December 2004 | 978-0785115366 |
| Fantastic Four, Vol. 6: Rising Storm | Fantastic Four #520–524 | Mark Waid | June 2005 | 978-0785115984 |
| Fantastic Four by J. Michael Straczynski, Vol. 1 | Fantastic Four #527–532 | J. Michael Straczynski | January 2006 | 978-0785117162 |
| Fantastic Four: The Life Fantastic | Fantastic Four #533–535; Fantastic Four Special #1; Fantastic Four: The Wedding Special; Fantastic Four: A Death in the Family | J. Michael Straczynski | September 2006 | 978-0785118961 |
| The Road to Civil War | Fantastic Four #536–537; New Avengers: Illuminati; The Amazing Spider-Man #529–531 | Brian Michael Bendis, J. Michael Straczynski | February 2007 | 978-0785119746 |
| Fantastic Four: Civil War | Fantastic Four #538–543 | J. Michael Straczynski, Dwayne McDuffie | May 2007 | 978-0785122272 |
| The New Fantastic Four | Fantastic Four #544–550 | Dwayne McDuffie | May 2008 | 978-0785124832 |
| Fantastic Four: The Beginning of the End | Fantastic Four #525–526, 551–553; Isla de la Muerte | Dwayne McDuffie | May 2008 | 978-0785125549 |
| Fantastic Four: World's Greatest | Fantastic Four #554–561 | Mark Millar | March 2009 | 978-0785125556 |
| Fantastic Four: The Master of Doom | Fantastic Four #562–569 | Mark Millar | January 2010 | 978-0785129677 |
| Fantastic Four by Jonathan Hickman, Vol. 1: Solve Everything | Fantastic Four #570–574 | Jonathan Hickman | July 2010 | 978-0785136880 |
| Fantastic Four by Jonathan Hickman, Vol. 2: Prime Elements | Fantastic Four #575–578 | Jonathan Hickman | December 2010 | 978-0785145417 |
| Fantastic Four by Jonathan Hickman, Vol. 3: The Future Foundation | Fantastic Four #579–582 | Jonathan Hickman | April 2011 | 978-0785147183 |
| Fantastic Four by Jonathan Hickman, Vol. 4: Three | Fantastic Four #583–588 | Jonathan Hickman | November 2011 | 978-0785151432 |
| Fantastic Four by Jonathan Hickman, Vol. 5: Forever | Fantastic Four #600–604 | Jonathan Hickman | January 2013 | 0785161538 |
| Fantastic Four by Jonathan Hickman, Vol. 6: Foundation | Fantastic Four #605–611; #605.1 | Jonathan Hickman | July 2013 | 978-0785161554 |

=== Fantastic Four Volume 4 ===
| Title | Material collected | Writer | Publication date | ISBN |
|---|---|---|---|---|
| Fantastic Four, Vol. 1: New Departure, New Arrivals | Fantastic Four (vol. 4) #1–3, FF (vol. 2) #1–2 | Matt Fraction | April 2013 | 978-0785166597 |
| Fantastic Four, Vol. 2: Road Trip | Fantastic Four (vol. 4) #4–8 | Matt Fraction | September 2013 | 0785166602 |
| Fantastic Four, Vol. 3: Doomed | Fantastic Four (vol. 4) #9–16 | Matt Fraction | March 2014 | 0785188835 |

=== Fantastic Four Volume 5 ===
The issue numbering of Volume 5 reverted to the overall legacy number of the title.

| Title | Material collected | Writer | Publication date | ISBN |
|---|---|---|---|---|
| Fantastic Four, Vol. 1: The Fall of the Fantastic Four | Fantastic Four (vol. 5) #1–5 | James Robinson and Leonard Kirk | September 2014 | 978-0785154747 |
| Fantastic Four, Vol. 2: Original Sin | Fantastic Four (vol. 5) #6–10 | James Robinson and Leonard Kirk | November 2014 | 978-0785154754 |
| Fantastic Four, Vol. 3: Back in Blue | Fantastic Four (vol. 5) #11–14, Annual 1 | James Robinson and Leonard Kirk | May 2015 | 978-0785192206 |
| Fantastic Four, Vol. 4: The End is Fourever | Fantastic Four #642-645 | James Robinson and Leonard Kirk | July 2015 | 978-0785197447 |

=== Fantastic Four Volume 6 ===
| Title | Material collected | Writer | Publication date | ISBN |
|---|---|---|---|---|
| Fantastic Four Vol. 1: Fourever | Fantastic Four (vol. 6) #1–4 | Dan Slott | March 2019 | 978-1302913502 |
| Fantastic Four Vol. 2: Mr. And Mrs. Grimm | Fantastic Four (vol. 6) #5, Fantastic Four: Wedding Special #1, Fantastic Four (vol. 1) #8 | Dan Slott, Fred Hembeck, Gail Simone, Stan Lee | June 2019 | 978-1302913496 |
| Fantastic Four Vol. 3: The Herald Of Doom | Fantastic Four (vol. 6) #6-11 | Dan Slott | October 2019 | 978-1302914424 |
| Fantastic Four Vol. 4: Thing Vs. Immortal Hulk | Fantastic Four (vol. 6) #12-13, Fantastic Four: 4 Yancy Street #1, Fantastic Four: Negative Zone #1 | Dan Slott, Gerry Duggan, Mike Carey | March 2020 | 978-1302917258 |
| Fantastic Four Vol. 5: Point Of Origin | Fantastic Four (vol. 6) #14-20 | Dan Slott | September 2020 | 978-1302920326 |
| Fantastic Four Vol. 6: Empyre | Fantastic Four (vol. 6) #21-24, Empyre: Fantastic Four #0, Empyre Fallout: Fantastic Four #1 | Dan Slott | December 2020 | 978-1302920470 |
| Fantastic Four Vol. 7: The Forever Gate | Fantastic Four (vol. 6) #25-30 | Dan Slott | May 2021 | 978-1302920487 |
| Fantastic Four Vol. 8: The Bride Of Doom | Fantastic Four (vol. 6) #31-35 | Dan Slott, Jason Loo, Mark Waid | November 2021 | 978-1302920494 |
| Fantastic Four Vol. 9: Eternal Flame | Fantastic Four (vol. 6) #36-39, Fantastic Four: Road Trip #1, Fantastic Four: Grimm Noir #1 | Dan Slott, Christopher Cantwell, Gerry Duggan | March 2022 | 978-1302926267 |
| Fantastic Four Vol. 10: The Reckoning War Part I | Fantastic Four (vol. 6) #40-42, Fantastic Four: Reckoning War Alpha #1, Reckoning War: Trial Of The Watcher #1 | Dan Slott | May 2022 | 978-1302932626 |
| Fantastic Four Vol. 11: The Reckoning War Part II | Fantastic Four (vol. 6) #43-46 | Dan Slott | September 2022 | 978-1302946548 |

=== Fantastic Four Volume 7 ===
| Title | Material collected | Writer | Publication date | ISBN |
|---|---|---|---|---|
| Fantastic Four Vol. 1: Whatever Happened to the Fantastic Four? | Fantastic Four (vol. 7) #1-6 | Ryan North | July 2023 | 978-1302932633 |
| Fantastic Four Vol. 2: Four Stories About Hope | Fantastic Four (vol. 7) #7-11 | Ryan North | January 2024 | 978-1302934927 |
| Fantastic Four Vol. 3: The Impossible Is Probable | Fantastic Four (vol. 7) #12-17 | Ryan North | June 2024 | 978-1302528119 |
| Fantastic Four Vol. 4: Fortune Favors The Fantastic | Fantastic Four (vol. 7) #18-22 | Ryan North | October 2024 | 978-1302955991 |
| Fantastic Four Vol. 5: Aliens, Ghosts, and Alternate Earths | Fantastic Four (vol. 7) #23-28 | Ryan North | April 2025 | 978-1302960650 |
| Fantastic Four Vol. 6: Our World Under Doom | Fantastic Four (vol. 7) #29-33; Giant-Size Fantastic Four (2024) #1 | Ryan North | October 2025 | 978-1302960797 |

=== Marvel Knights Fantastic Four ===
| Title | Material collected | Writer | Publication date | ISBN |
|---|---|---|---|---|
| Marvel Knights Fantastic Four, Vol. 1: Wolf at the Door | Marvel Knights 4 #1–7 | Roberto Aguirre-Sacasa | September 2004 | 978-0785114710 |
| Marvel Knights Fantastic Four, Vol. 2: The Stuff of Nightmares | Marvel Knights 4 #8–12 | Roberto Aguirre-Sacasa | January 2005 | 978-0785114727 |
| Marvel Knights Fantastic Four, Vol. 3: Divine Time | Marvel Knights 4 #13–18 | Roberto Aguirre-Sacasa | July 2005 | 978-0785116783 |
| Marvel Knights Fantastic Four, Vol. 4: Impossible Things Happen Every Day | Marvel Knights 4 #19–24 | Roberto Aguirre-Sacasa | January 2006 | 978-0785118084 |
| Marvel Knights Fantastic Four, Vol. 5: The Resurrection of Nicholas Scratch | Marvel Knights 4 #25–30 | Roberto Aguirre-Sacasa | September 2006 | 978-0785119593 |

=== Other paperbacks ===
| Title | Material collected | Writer | Publication date | ISBN |
|---|---|---|---|---|
| Fantastic Four vs. the X-Men | Fantastic Four vs. the X-Men #1–4 | Chris Claremont | October 1991 | 978-0871356505 |
| Fantastic Four: 1234 | Fantastic Four: 1234 #1–4 | Grant Morrison | September 2002 | 0-7851-1040-2 |
| Fantastic Four: Foes | Fantastic Four: Foes #1–6 | Robert Kirkman | January 2005 | 978-0785116622 |
| Fantastic Four/Spider-Man Classic | The Fantastic Four #218; Marvel Team-Up #100, 132–133; The Amazing Spider-Man #1; The Spectacular Spider-Man #42; Untold Tales of Spider-Man Annual '96 | Kurt Busiek, Chris Claremont, John Marc DeMatteis, Stan Lee, Bill Mantlo | April 2005 | 978-0785118039 |
| Fantastic Four/Iron Man: Big in Japan | Fantastic Four/Iron Man: Big in Japan #1–4; Spider-Man Unlimited #8 | Zeb Wells | June 2006 | 978-0785117766 |
| House of M: Fantastic Four/Iron Man | Fantastic Four: House of M #1–3; Iron Man: House of M #1–3 | John Layman | July 2006 | 978-0785119234 |
| Fantastic Four: First Family | Fantastic Four: First Family #1–6 | Joe Casey | November 2006 | 978-0785117032 |
| Spider-Man and the Fantastic Four: Silver Rage | Spider-Man and the Fantastic Four #1–4 | Jeff Parker | October 2007 | 978-0785126737 |
| Black Panther: Four the Hard Way | Black Panther vol. 4 #26–30 | Reginald Hudlin | November 2007 | 978-0785126553 |
| Black Panther: Little Green Men | Black Panther vol. 4 #31–34 | Reginald Hudlin | May 2008 | 978-0785126577 |
| Secret Invasion: Fantastic Four | Fantastic Four #300, 357–358; Secret Invasion: Fantastic Four #1–3 | Roberto Aguirre-Sacasa | February 2009 | 978-0785132479 |
| Fantastic Four: True Story | Fantastic Four: True Story #1–4 | Paul Cornell | May 2009 | 978-0785128335 |
| Fantastic Four: Lost Adventures | Fantastic Four #296, 543; Fantastic Four: The Lost Adventure; The Last Fantastic Four Story | Stan Lee | September 2009 | 978-0785140474 |
| Dark Reign: Fantastic Four | Dark Reign: Fantastic Four #1–5 | Jonathan Hickman | October 2009 | 978-0785139089 |
| Fantastic Four: Extended Family | Fantastic Four #1, 81, 132, 168, 265, 307, 347, 384; Fantastic Four vol. 3 #42; Fantastic Four #544 | Stan Lee, Roy Thomas, John Byrne, Steve Englehart, Walter Simonson, Tom DeFalco, Dwayne McDuffie, Carlos Pacheco, Rafael Marin, Jeph Loeb | March 2011 | 978-0785153030 |

=== Epic Collections ===
| # | Title | Material collected | Pages | First edition | ISBN |
|---|---|---|---|---|---|
| 1 | The World's Greatest Comic Magazine | The Fantastic Four #1–18 | 456 | September 10, 2014 | 978-0785188322 |
| 2 | The Master Plan of Doctor Doom | The Fantastic Four #19–32, Annual #1-2 | 448 | July 28, 2017 | 978-1302904357 |
| 3 | The Coming of Galactus | Fantastic Four #33–51, Annual #3 | 448 | August 1, 2018 | 978-1302913311 |
| 4 | The Mystery of the Black Panther | Fantastic Four #52-67, Annual #4-5, and material from Not Brand Echh #1, #5 | 448 | August 21, 2019 | 978-1302915568 |
| 5 | The Name is Doom | Fantastic Four #68-87, Annual #6, and material from Not Brand Echh #6, #7 | 504 | June 24, 2020 | 978-1302922030 |
| 6 | At War with Atlantis | Fantastic Four #88-104, and Fantastic Four: The Lost Adventure #1 | 408 | October 28, 2020 | 978-1302922023 |
| 7 | Battle of the Behemoths | Fantastic Four #105-125 | 472 | August 25, 2021 | 978-1302929138 |
| 8 | Annihilus Revealed | Fantastic Four #126-146, and Giant-Size Super Stars #1 | 408 | August 23, 2022 | 978-1302933593 |
| 9 | The Crusader Syndrome | Fantastic Four #147-167, Giant-Size Fantastic Four #2-4; Avengers #127 | 520 | August 29, 2023 | 978-1302948757 |
| 10 | Counter Earth Must Die | Fantastic Four #168-191, Annual 11; Marvel Two-In-One #20, Annual 1 | 512 | September 24, 2024 | 978-1302955441 |
| 11 | Four No More | Fantastic Four #192-214, Annual 12-13 | 520 | March 4, 2025 | 978-1302960551 |
| 12 | The Possession of Franklin Richards | Fantastic Four #215-231, Annual 14-16 | 472 | August 5, 2025 | 978-1302960568 |
| 13 | Back To The Basics | Fantastic Four #232-248; Fantastic Four Roast #1 | 496 | February 3, 2026 | 978-1302967673 |
| 17 | All in the Family | Fantastic Four #291–307, Annual #20, The Fantastic Four vs. the X-Men #1-4 | 496 | January 15, 2014 | 978-0785188650 |
| 18 | The More Things Change... | Fantastic Four #308-320, Annual #21, Incredible Hulk #350, Marvel Graphic Novel: Hulk/Thing: The Big Change | 472 | June 19, 2019 | 978-1302918460 |
| 19 | The Dream Is Dead | Fantastic Four #321-333, Annual #22, and Marvel Graphic Novel #49 — Doctor Strange and Doctor Doom: Triumph and Torment | 464 | March 21, 2023 | 978-1302951122 |
| 20 | Into the Time Stream | Fantastic Four #334-346, Fantastic Four Annual #23; material from New Mutants Annual #6, X-Factor Annual #5, X-Men Annual #14 | 504 | July 23, 2014 | 978-0785188957 |
| 21 | The New Fantastic Four | Fantastic Four #347-361, Fantastic Four Annual #24; material from Marvel Holiday Special #1 | 504 | June 27, 2018 | 978-1302911379 |
| 22 | This Flame, This Fury | Fantastic Four #362-376, Fantastic Four Annual #25-26; Adventures of the Thing #3 | 489 | November 10, 2021 | 978-1302932367 |
| 23 | Nobody Gets Out Alive | Fantastic Four #377-392, Fantastic Four Annual #27; Namor the Sub-Mariner #47-48; Fantastic Four Ashcan Edition | 491 | March 9, 2022 | 978-1302934477 |
| 24 | Atlantis Rising | Fantastic Four #393-402, Fantastic Force #7-9; Fantastic Four: Atlantis Rising #1-2; Fantastic Four: Atlantis Rising Collector's Preview | 480 | March 24, 2024 | 978-1302956394 |
| 25 | Strange Days | Fantastic Four #403–416, Fantastic Four: The Legend, Onslaught: Marvel Universe; material from Tales of the Marvel Universe | 472 | May 20, 2015 | 978-0785192954 |

=== Hardcovers ===
| Title | Material collected | Writer | Publication date | ISBN |
|---|---|---|---|---|
| The Best of the Fantastic Four, Volume One | Fantastic Four #1, 39–40, 51, 100, 116, 176, 236, 267; Fantastic Four Annual #2; Fantastic Four vol. 3 #56, 60; Marvel Fanfare #15; Marvel Two-in-One #50; Marvel Knights 4 #4 | John Byrne, Archie Goodwin, Karl Kesel, Stan Lee, Roy Thomas, Barry Windsor-Smith | June 2005 | 978-0785117827 |
| Fantastic Four Omnibus, Vol. 1 | Fantastic Four #1–30, Annual #1 | Stan Lee | November 2007 | 978-0785118701 |
| Fantastic Four Omnibus, Vol. 2 | Fantastic Four #31–60, Annual #2–4 | Stan Lee | June 2007 | 978-0785124030 |
| Fantastic Four Omnibus, Vol. 3 | Fantastic Four #61–93, Annual #5–7, Not Brand Echh #5–7 | Stan Lee | May 2015 | 978-0785191742 |
| Fantastic Four Omnibus, Vol. 4 | Fantastic Four #94-125, Fantastic Four: The Lost Adventure (2008) #1, material from Annual #8-9 | Stan Lee | September 2021 | 978-1302930509 |
| Fantastic Four: The Overthrow of Doom | Fantastic Four #192–200 | Marv Wolfman | September 2011 | 978-0785156055 |
| Fantastic Four: In Search of Galactus | Fantastic Four #204–214 | Marv Wolfman | February 2010 | 978-0785137344 |
| Fantastic Four by John Byrne Omnibus, Vol. 1 | Marvel Team-Up #61–62; Marvel Two-In-One #50; Fantastic Four #209–218, 220–221, 232–260 and Annual #17; Avengers #233; Thing #2 | John Byrne | November 2011 | 978-0785158240 |
| Fantastic Four by John Byrne Omnibus, Vol. 2 | Fantastic Four #261–295; Fantastic Four Annual #18–19; Alpha Flight #4; The Thing #7, 10 and 19; The Avengers Annual #14; material from Secret Wars II #2; Epic Illustrated #26–34; What If...? #36; What The--?! #2 and 10; Fantastic Four Roast #1; and Fantastic Four Special Edition | John Byrne | December 2013 | 978-0785185437 |
| Secret Wars II Omnibus | Fantastic Four #282, 285, 288, 316–319, plus others titles. | John Byrne, Steve Englehart | May 2009 | 978-0785131113 |
| Inferno Crossovers | Fantastic Four #322–324, plus other titles | Steve Englehart | September 2010 | 978-0785146711 |
| Fantastic Four: Resurrection of Galactus | Fantastic Four vol. 3 #46–50, Annual 2001 | Jeph Loeb, Raphael Marin | January 2011 | 978-0785144762 |
| Fantastic Four, Vol. 1 | Fantastic Four (vol. 3) #60–70; Fantastic Four #500–502 | Mark Waid | August 2004 | 978-0785114864 |
| Fantastic Four, Vol. 2 | Fantastic Four #503–513 | Mark Waid | March 2005 | 978-0785117759 |
| Fantastic Four, Vol. 3 | Fantastic Four #514–524 | Mark Waid, Karl Kesel | November 2005 | 978-0785120117 |
| Fantastic Four by J. Michael Straczynski, Vol. 1 | Fantastic Four #527–532 | J. Michael Straczynski | January 2006 | 978-0785120292 |
| The New Fantastic Four | Fantastic Four #544–550 | Dwayne McDuffie | November 2007 | 978-0785128472 |
| Fantastic Four: World's Greatest | Fantastic Four #554–561 | Mark Millar | January 2009 | 978-0785132257 |
| Fantastic Four: The Master of Doom | Fantastic Four #562–569 | Mark Millar | October 2009 | 978-0785133704 |
| Fantastic Four by Jonathan Hickman, Vol. 1 | Fantastic Four #570–574 | Jonathan Hickman | March 2010 | 978-0785143178 |
| Fantastic Four by Jonathan Hickman, Vol. 2 | Fantastic Four #575–578 | Jonathan Hickman | July 2010 | 978-0785147169 |
| Fantastic Four by Jonathan Hickman, Vol. 3 | Fantastic Four #579–582 | Jonathan Hickman | November 2010 | 978-0785147176 |
| Fantastic Four by Jonathan Hickman, Vol. 4 | Fantastic Four #583–588 | Jonathan Hickman | May 2011 | 978-0785148913 |
| Fantastic Four Jonathan Hickman, Vol. 5 | Fantastic Four #600–605 | Jonathan Hickman | July 2012 | 978-0785161523 |
| Fantastic Four Jonathan Hickman, Vol. 6 | Fantastic Four #605, 606–611 | Jonathan Hickman | January 2013 | 978-0785161547 |
| Fantastic Four Vol. 1: New Departures, New Arrivals | Fantastic Four (vol. 4) #1–3, FF vol. 2 #1–3, and material from Marvel Point One #1 | Matt Fraction | April 2013 | 978-0785166597 |
| Fantastic Four Vol. 2: Road Trip | Fantastic Four vol. 4 #4–8 | Matt Fraction | September 2013 | 978-0785166603 |
| Fantastic Four Vol. 3: Doomed | Fantastic Four vol. 4 # 9–16 | Matt Fraction | March 2014 | 978-0785188834 |
| Fantastic Four/Spider-Man Classic | The Fantastic Four #218; Marvel Team-Up #100, 132–133; The Amazing Spider-Man #1; The Spectacular Spider-Man #42; Untold Tales of Spider-Man Annual '96 | Kurt Busiek, Chris Claremont, J. M. DeMatteis, Stan Lee, Bill Mantlo | January 2005 | 978-1415607190 |
| X-Men/Fantastic Four | X-Men/Fantastic Four #1–5 | Akira Yoshida | February 2005 | 978-0785115205 |
| Fantastic Four: Lost Adventures | Fantastic Four #296, 543; Fantastic Four: The Lost Adventure; The Last Fantastic Four Story | Stan Lee | July 2008 | 978-0785130970 |
| House of M: Spider-Man, Fantastic Four, and X-Men | Fantastic Four: House of M #1–3; Spider-Man: House of M #1–5; Black Panther vol. 4, 7; New Thunderbolts #11; Uncanny X-Men #462–465 | Chris Claremont, Reginald Hudlin, John Layman, Fabian Nicieza, Tom Peyer, Mark Waid | December 2009 | 978-0785138815 |
| X-Men vs. Fantastic Four | Fantastic Four vs. the X-Men #1–4; Fantastic Four #28 | Chris Claremont, Stan Lee | January 2010 | 978-0785138075 |
| Fantastic Four by Dan Slott | Fantastic Four (vol. 6) #21–30, Empyre : Fantastic Four #0, and Empyre: Fallout - Fantastic Four #1 | Dan Slott, Sean Izaakse, Ze carlos, Paco Medina, R.B. Silva | ???? | 978-1302945343 |

== International publication ==
=== North America ===
The Fantastic Four has been published in translation around the world, beginning in 1962 in Mexico as Los Cuatro Fantásticos published by La Prensa until the mid-1970s, then by Macc Division until 1980 and finally by Novedades Editores from 1980 to 1982 and French-speaking Canada as Les Fantastic Four, from 1969 to 1986, after which the title was merged with the Spider-Man title for three more years. Mexican translators were not consistent in their translations of the characters' code names; The Thing was called Coloso (Colossus) in the first series, La Mole in the second and the third (which was the name used for The Hulk in the first series). The other three main characters had more stable translated names: Mister Fantástico (sometimes translated as Señor Fantástico), La Chica (or La Mujer) Invisible, and La Antorcha Humana. Dr. Doom was Doctor Destino and She-Hulk was La Mujer Hulk in her run in the Fantastic Four. In the movie, and in current appearances in Mexico, Mister Fantastic is referred to as "El Hombre Elástico" (Elastic Man). Canada rarely translated character names from their English version, although sometimes switching back and forth between English and French names in the same issue (The Thing / La Chose, Mister Fantastic / Monsieur Fantastic, Invisible Girl / Fille (or Femme) Invisible, Human Torch / Torche Humaine). The names of Dr. Doom and She-Hulk were not translated into French for the Canadian reprints.

=== United Kingdom ===
British publication of the series began sporadically appearing in the black and white anthology title Mystic in the 1960s. It began to appear regularly in Wham! from 1966 to 1968, then Smash! in 1968 and 1969, both titles published by Odhams Press. In 1972, the Fantastic Four's adventures were published starting with issue 1 of the US comic in Mighty World of Marvel alongside Spider-Man and Hulk reprints when Marvel Comics began its imprint Marvel UK. In 1976 the feature was moved to star in Marvel UK's The Titans, in an attempt to revive flagging sales, starting with issue #27. But after just a few months the feature was removed from The Titans (replaced by The Avengers) to form part of the line up of the new Captain Britain Weekly for its first issue in October 1976. After the demise of Captain Britain Weekly the FF went with Captain Britain into the merged Super Spider-man and Captain Britain Weekly in July 1977. A few months after the merger a new title The Complete Fantastic Four was launched in September 1977 starting with the story from the US Fantastic Four #133. Unusually The Complete Fantastic Four reprinted an entire issue of the US publication at a time when stories were always broken up into several installments. As a backup strip it started serializing the FF's adventures from US Fantastic Four #1, but this was replaced by The Invaders towards the end of the run. In 1978 that series merged into Mighty World Of Marvel returning the FF to their original home alongside the Hulk. Their last adventure in that title was issue 329, when they were moved out so that the comic could be relaunched as Marvel Comic in early 1979. Their adventures briefly moved back into Spider-Man Comic before stopping shortly after John Byrne took over pencilling chores on the strip.

In March 1980 Marvel UK launched the monthly Fantastic Four Pocketbook reprinting older Lee and Kirby stories. In September 1980 their new adventures continued in the new weekly anthology title Marvel Team-Up, remaining in the comic until its cancellation with the edition dated 4 March 1981. From 1 April 1981, the Fantastic Four was part of a new title, Marvel Action, which only lasted 15 issues before it merged with Captain America (#21). The FF strip transferred to the temporarily renamed Marvel Action starring Captain America. The FF strip's last appearance was in Captain America #36, stopping in preparation for the comic's merger with another Marvel UK anthology title, Marvel Super Adventure the next week. After the cancellation of the Pocketbook in July 1982 the classic FF strips continued in the short lived Fantastic Four weekly title that ran from 6 October 1982 for a total of 29 issues. That series merged into Spider-Man. During 1985 the Fantastic Four and other Marvel titles such as The New Mutants, The Avengers, and The X-Men were included in the Secret Wars II reprint title. This mostly focused on issues which crossed over into the Secret Wars II maxi series.

From 2005, around the release of the Fantastic Four film, the super-team appeared in two new publications published by Panini Comics: Fantastic Four Adventures, and Ultimate Fantastic Four. The latter only lasted 10 issues, ending in 2006. Fantastic Four Adventures which reprinted the mainstream version of the team lasted longer, ending in February 2010.

=== France ===
Publication history in France started with the reprinting of the first 10 pages of Fantastic Four #50 in 1967 in an anthology title called Les Chefs-d'Oeuvres de la Bande Dessinée [Comic Book Masterpieces]. In 1974, the first four issues of the title were published, one page at a time, in the daily newspaper France-Soir. But primarily, rights to the Fantastic Four in France were held by a company called Éditions Lug, which began publishing Fantastic Four first in a 1969 anthology title called Fantask, along with Spider-Man and Silver Surfer, then in another anthology called Marvel. The censors objected to the content of the book, and citing "nightmarish visions" and "terrifying science fiction" as the reasons, forced their cancellations after respectively 7 and 13 issues. Although other anthologies featuring Marvel strips continued, notably Strange (featuring the X-Men, Iron Man, and the Silver Surfer), the Fantastic Four remained unpublished in France until 1973.

Éditions Lug created a format aimed more for adults; an 80-page series called Une Aventure des Fantastiques debuted where the old series left off, with the stories that introduced the Inhumans and Galactus. That series lasted over 15 years, coming out four times a year.

In the mid-1970s, a title called Spidey was released by Éditions Lug. Primarily featuring reprints from the juvenile comic book Spidey Super Stories, it also featured a similarly themed FF series produced in France. These original stories had art that closely resembled the work of Jack Kirby or John Buscema, but the storylines themselves included watered-down supervillains, the FF on vacation, and even Santa Claus. This series was replaced by 1960s-era X-Men reprints when Marvel demanded the same royalties for Éditions Lug's original stories that they did for the US reprints. Eventually, a regular monthly series began publication in France, and the Fantastic Four took over the headlining position in the pocket format anthology Nova (sharing the title with Spider-Woman, Peter Parker, She-Hulk, and Silver Surfer) and lasted until Marvel began publishing its own titles under the newly formed Marvel France line in the late 1990s. Fantastic Four shared space in the Silver Surfer's own book until the Heroes Reborn storyline created their own title, supported by Captain America. "Fantastic Four" then appeared in the anthology "Marvel Legends" and currently appears in "Marvel Icons", sharing that title with the Avengers.

Two different French companies held rights to Marvel Comics at the same time in the late 1970s and early 1980s. Éditions Lug (which eventually became Semic Comics) published Fantastic Four, Spider-Man, X-Men, Daredevil, and Iron Man, and most related series, while Aredit held the rights to Avengers, Hulk, Thor, Captain America, Sub-Mariner and many of the 1970s-era modern series like Ghost Rider, Man-Thing, Power Man and the first She-Hulk series. Often, crossovers would force one company to publish another's title, i.e. the Marvel Two-in-One and Fantastic Four annuals that crossed over into the Invaders story would have to be published by the "other" company, and in fact that particular crossover was published twice, once by each company. This resulted in different translations of the characters' names — Susan Storm Richards was called "Jane" in her own title by Editions Lug, and Reed was called "Red," a combination of letters easier to pronounce than the double E sound. When Aredit published a Fantastic Four appearance they kept the traditional US names. Generally speaking, their names in France were: Monsieur Fantastic (although Mister was often used as well), L'Invisible, La Chose, and La Torche. (Rarely was "Humaine" used in the French editions.) Dr. Doom was called Docteur Fatalis and She-Hulk was called Miss Hulk.

=== Germany ===
"Die Fantastischen Vier" first appeared in Hit Comics, a weekly title that rotated the main feature with other Marvel titles. Williams Comics eventually obtained the rights to Marvel's line and began publishing (for the first time in color) in the mid-1970s. Fantastic Four was backed up with Daredevil and began with issue #1. No annual was published by Williams and some early numbers were left out (5, 6, 10, 12, 21 and 44). Condor Comic carried the title in the 1980s and 1990s, and published a series of 47 pocket format books at about 168-196 pages each. It also published a paperback series in a similar format to the Marvel Graphic Novels with 12 issues of 52 pages each. Marvel Deutschland (later Panini Comics Deutschland) publishes "Die Fantastischen Vier". Since 2008 the series is named with its original title "The Fantastic Four". The German names of the characters are Das Ding (The Thing), Die Fackel or Die menschliche Fackel (The Human Torch), Die Unsichtbare (The Invisible One), and Mr. Fantastisch (Mr. Fantastic). Silver Surfer and She-Hulk retained their English names. Some early Williams editions refer to Dr. Doom as "Doktor Unheil". In one Williams publication Dr.Doom is also referred to as "Doktor Untergang". Later they call him by his original US name.

=== Italy ===
Editoriale Corno initially published I Fantastici Quattro in Italy (first with Captain Marvel as backup feature, then rotating with other backup features). Star Comics published the title in the 1990s, followed by Marvel Italia. Character names are typically translated as "la Cosa" (Thing), "la Torcia Umana" (Human Torch) and "la Donna Invisibile" (Invisible Woman), while Dr. Doom is "Dottor Destino". Mister Fantastic, She-Hulk and Silver Surfer kept their English names. Also released in Italy was the series I Fantastici Quattro gigante, an oversized magazine reprinting in chronological order all the super-team's appearances including the Human Torch solo series from Strange Tales.

== See also ==
- Marvel Action Hour: Fantastic Four
