= Doop (character) =

- Doop. Art by Mike Allred.

Publication information
- Publisher: Marvel Comics
- First appearance: X-Force #116 (July 2001)
- Created by: Peter Milligan (writer); Mike Allred (artist)

In-story information
- Alter ego: Doop
- Team affiliations: X-Force; X-Statix; Jean Grey School
- Abilities: Flight; Accelerated healing factor Superhuman strength and durability Physical malleability Ability to replicate physical objects Extra-dimensional void within body that can store objects and people

Doop is a fictional character appearing in American comic books published by Marvel Comics. The character appears in the Marvel Universe, created by writer Peter Milligan and artist Mike Allred. He made his debut in X-Force #116. He is a green, floating reniform creature of unknown origins who speaks in a "language" all his own (represented in text by a special font).

== Publication history ==
Doop first appeared in X-Force #116, and appeared in every issue until the end of the series, and then appeared in all issues of X-Statix. Doop also appeared alongside Wolverine in a two-issue limited series and then in Wolverine & the X-Men, and had his own comic book mini series called "All New Doop".

== Fictional character biography ==
Doop is said to be the product of a Cold War era U.S. military experiment, becoming instrumental in the fall of the Soviet Union.

He later served as the cameraman for the celebrity mutant superhero team X-Statix (formerly known as X-Force). He films a mission to North Africa which is later criticized by then-team leader Zeitgeist; he feels Doop should not be going for artistic shots. The next X-Force mission is to New York, where they are to rescue the boy band "Boyz R Us" from hostage takers. While in the briefing room, U-Go Girl asks Doop not to keep shooting her rear from a low angle. Doop replies in his language only the characters know, while inexplicably mouthing some of his recording equipment.

The building is attacked by a helicopter gunship, killing the hostages and many of the terrorists. Most of the team dies also, with the exception of Doop, U-Go Girl, and Anarchist.

A section of X-Force headquarters is set aside for Doop's family, who are never seen in panel. The team hides in this area when they believe themselves to be in supernatural danger.

=== Brain power ===
In one incident, Doop's brain explodes, and parts of it land around the world. X-Statix and Avengers fight each other to gain control of the brain pieces. Doop, running on a backup brain and now capable of human speech, battles Thor to a standstill. The Avengers allow Doop back in to X-Statix custody, after they show courage and responsibility in facing the Asgardian threat of the "Three Sisters".

=== Doop and Daap ===
After the incident with the Avengers, X-Statix holds a farewell party, attended by fans and multiple superheroes. They are hired for one last mission, ridding a billionaire's mansion of terrorists that have taken control of the building. During the mission, the members of X-Statix are attacked and apparently killed.

Havok and Polaris encounter a Doop-like entity called Daap when it crashes to Earth from outer space. Havok blasts Daap to pieces, but it begins to reform itself. Daap's remains fly off with both Polaris and the mutant-hating Leper Queen. The true identity of Daap and any connection it has with Doop is left unrevealed.

=== Return ===
Doop returns in a story published in the Nation X anthology series, where he is brought onboard Utopia as a private investigator. The first issue of Wolverine and the X-Men lists Doop as an adjunct member of the teaching staff at the Jean Grey Institute for Higher Learning. He is eventually shown substituting for Kitty Pryde's "Introduction to Religion" class, though, under Doop, the course largely consists of watching films while Doop takes naps. The students are shown to be comically unable to decipher Doop's lesson plan. Doop secretly gathers information regarding possible threats to the students.

After semi-regular appearances in Wolverine and the X-Men, Doop returned in April 2014 in a five-issue mini-series, All New Doop, written by creator Peter Milligan, penciled by David Lafuente, with covers by Mike Allred. This series focuses on Doop's romantic feelings for Kitty Pryde. It also has the return of Doop's old teammate, the Anarchist.

== Powers and abilities ==
Doop possesses superhuman strength and durability, flight, regeneration, physical malleability, a vaguely defined ability to manipulate time and space, and the ability to replicate physical objects by unknown means. In the "'Nuff Said" issue of X-Force, he accidentally sucked the entire team into his body. When they were restored to reality, none but Doop was aware of what had occurred, and only a fraction of a second had passed.

Doop uses his mouth as a storage space for his camera equipment, among other items; it is unknown whether these items are simply stored inside his physical body or are actually transported to another dimension like the one to which his teammates were transported.

In the "X-Statix vs. Avengers" storyline in X-Statix, Doop's brain was removed from his body. The brain was accidentally smashed into fragments by Thor, with a second brain being placed in his head until his original brain could be reassembled.

=== Doopspeak ===
In 2001, several websites claimed to have deciphered Doopspeak. Series editor Axel Alonso responded in an October 8, 2001 article by Eric J. Moreels on the X-Fan site (now Comixfan) which was previously part of Cinescape.com:

It was brought to our attention only last week that some folks were popping over to Blambot.com to ostensibly decode the enigma of 'Doop Speak'. Do not be fooled. Says [series writer] Peter Milligan, and I quote: 'Any such alphabet that purports to exist is to 'Doop Speak' what a Greek Restaurant menu is to The Iliad. The complexities and nuances of Doop Speak — understood only by an initiated few — cannot be encompassed or delineated by any one image system.' Folks should 'translate' at their own risk.

However, Doopspeak was revealed in 2014, at the back of Essential X-Men #57.

== Other versions ==
=== Secret Wars (2015) ===
An alternate universe version of Doop appears in "Secret Wars" as a resident of the Battleworld domain of Marville.

=== Ultimate Universe ===
An alternate universe version of Doop appears in The Ultimates.

== In other media ==
=== Television ===
- Doop makes a non-speaking appearance in the Ultimate Spider-Man episode "Back in Black".
- Doop makes a non-speaking appearance in the X-Men '97 episode "Danger.exe".

=== Video games ===
- Doop appears in Marvel Heroes.
- Doop appears in Marvel Puzzle Quest.

=== Merchandise ===
- A figure of Doop was included with the Marvel Legends Series VI Deadpool figure.
- A Marvel Mini-Bust of DOOP by Bowen Designs was released in October 2004, as part of Phase II, Bust # 88 and sculpted by Randy Bowen.
