= Marvel Legends (disambiguation) =

Marvel Legends is an action figure line based on the characters of Marvel Comics.

Marvel Legends may also refer to:

- Marvel: Ultimate Alliance, a video game formerly titled "Marvel Legends"
- Marvel Legends (comics)
- Marvel Studios: Legends, a streaming series from Marvel Studios
