= The Incredible Hulks =

Comic Book Series

The Incredible Hulks volume 2 #1, cover dated 21 May 2014

The Incredible Hulks was a monthly comic book series published in the United Kingdom by Panini Comics as part of their Marvel 'Collectors' Edition' line, featuring reprints of Marvel Comics from the United States. It began publication in April 2012, replacing Panini's defunct Fantastic Four Adventures series. The first volume ended in April 2014 after 27 issues, with a second volume beginning the following month. Volume 3 began in August 2016. The series was replaced in 2017.

Each issue typically features three stories, each of which revolves around characters such as Hulk, She-Hulk, Red Hulk, Red She-Hulk, Lyra, Skaar, and A-Bomb, among others.

== Format ==
Each issue of The Incredible Hulks had 76 pages, including a contents page and a letters page. It typically featured 4 pages of advertisements. All ads were for Marvel-related merchandise. The covers were printed on thick cardstock. A typical issue featured reprints of three Hulk-related stories per issue. Occasionally, a 100-page special was published with four or five stories. It was cancelled in 2017 and was replaced with Deadpool Unleashed.

== Printed material ==
The Incredible Hulks reprinted material from the following US publications:

- Hulk
- Incredible Hulk
- Indestructible Hulk
- She-Hulks
- Red She-Hulk
- Hulk: Raging Thunder
- Fear Itself
- Totally Awesome Hulk
