= Panini Comics =

Italian comic publishing company

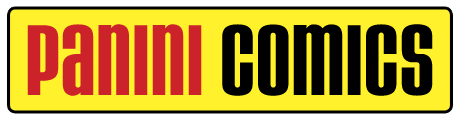
- Type: Division
- Industry: Printing
- Founded: 1994; 32 years ago as "Marvel Italia"
- Headquarters: Modena, Italy
- Area served: Europe, Latin America
- Products: Comics, graphic novels, magazines
- Parent: Panini Group
- Divisions: Marvel UK; Planet Manga
- Website: comics.panini.it

Panini Comics is an Italian comic book publisher. A division of Panini Group, which also produces collectible stickers, it is headquartered in Modena, Italy. The company publishes comic books in Argentina, Brazil, Chile, France, Germany, Hungary, Italy, Mexico, Peru, Portugal, Spain and the United Kingdom, as well as manga in several non-English-speaking countries through the Planet Manga publishing division.

In the United Kingdom, Panini Comics prints its Collectors' Edition (CE) line, which consists of reprints of American Marvel Comics. These are usually 76 pages long (with occasional 100-page specials). Each comic is published every 28 days, with the exception of Astonishing Spider-Man which has been published fortnightly since volume 2.

Since 2013, Panini Comics has been publishing digest size comics magazines featuring Disney characters.

== History ==
=== Italy and international ===
Panini Comics started as an evolution of Marvel Italia, an Italian division of Marvel Comics created in 1994 to publish Marvel titles in Italy, the rights to which had been previously held by different publishers (Star Comics, Comic Art, Play Press and Max Bunker Press). In December 1994, Marvel Italia was absorbed by Edizioni Panini of Modena, following the acquisition of the latter by Marvel Comics. Panini Comics in Italy has since evolved to encompass a series of sub-divisions:

- Marvel Italia, publishing translations of main Marvel Comics' US series
- Cult Comics, publishing translations of US comics not of Marvel origin (including Image Comics, Dynamite Entertainment, Dark Horse Comics) as well as original Italian comics
- Planet Manga (previously Marvel Manga), publishing mostly translations of manga, known in Mexico as "Panini Manga Mexico"
- Panini Video, releasing DVDs

Subsequently, Marvel Comics sold Panini to a group of investors including Indesit Company. Currently, Panini Comics also publishes in Brazil, France, Germany, the United Kingdom, Spain, Portugal and Hungary. In Germany and Brazil, it also publishes translations of DC Comics series.

=== UK ===
Panini obtained the Marvel UK license in 1995, enabling it to publish reprinted American Marvel Comics titles. They also began publishing the Doctor Who Magazine. Panini Comics had been part of Marvel Europe, and had already been reprinting American material across the continent for several years.

Thanks to this licensing deal, reprints of American Marvel Comics material were continued in the UK by Panini from the mid-1990s. Each issue of their 'Marvel Collector's Editions' series contained approximately two or three Marvel US strips in one issue with possibly a "classic" comic printed as a substitute for an installment in the current run, whilst being priced at a reasonable level. Initially the lineup consisted of only Astonishing Spider-Man and Essential X-Men and followed the continuity of the US comics, however it was approximately two to three years behind the current run in America.

In addition to reprinting the mainstream US comics, Panini also published a monthly (later every three weeks) oversized comic, entitled The Spectacular Spider-Man, for younger readers to accompany Spider-Man: The Animated Series, which began broadcasting in the UK in the mid-90s. Initially, the stories were simply reprints of the US comics based on the series, but eventually the title moved to all-new UK-originated stories, marking the first Marvel UK material featuring classic Marvel characters to be produced since early 1994.

==== 2000s ====
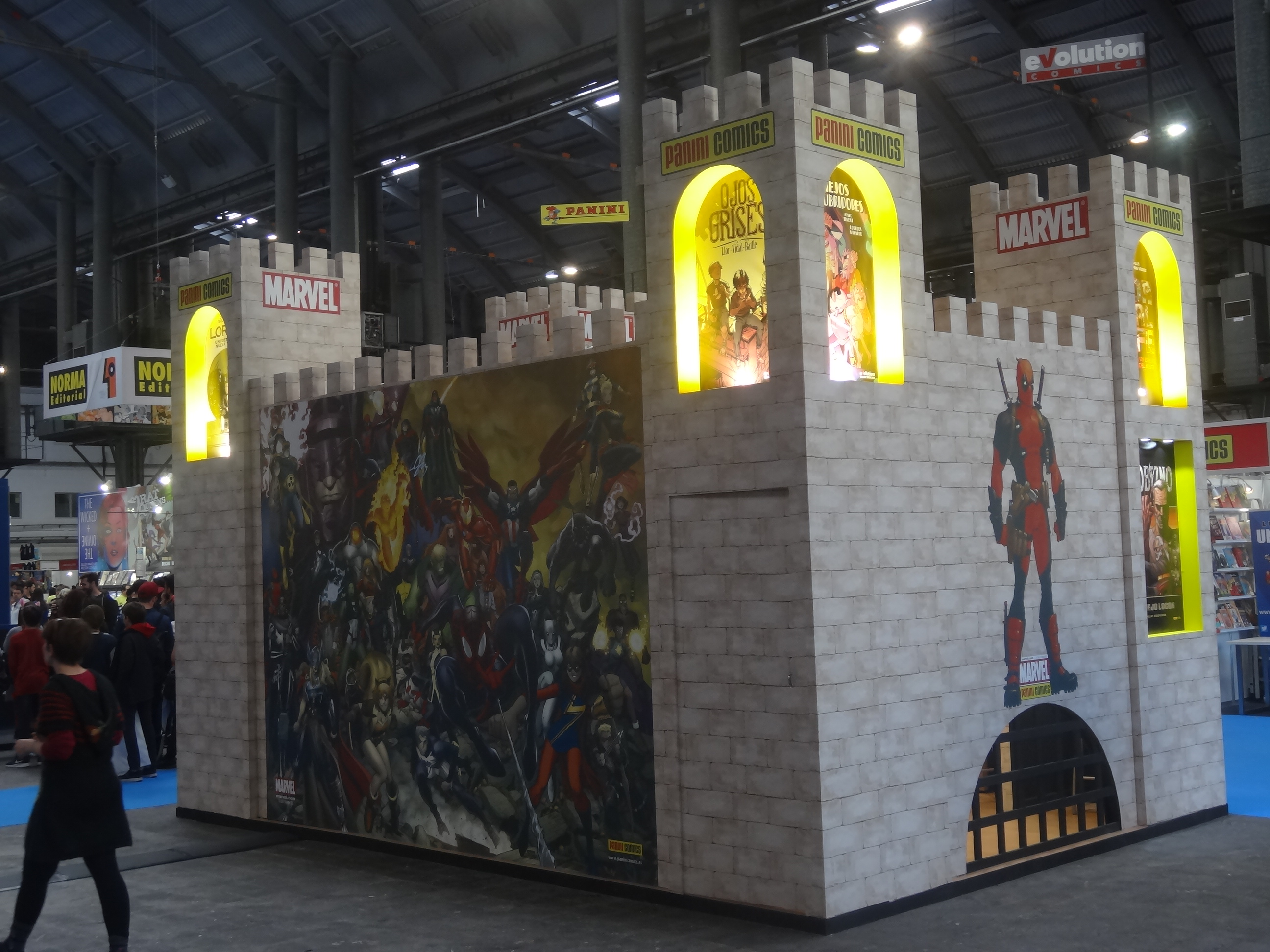
Panini Comics booth at the 2017 "Saló del Còmic de Barcelona" (Barcelona Comic Convention)

Panini have since extended their line to include other characters within the Marvel Universe. In addition to Essential X-Men and Astonishing Spider-Man came Wolverine: Unleashed, in which Wolverine's solo comic was reprinted. The comic ran for 54 issues before it was renamed Wolverine & Gambit to allow reprints of the Gambit series, and subsequently Wolverine and Deadpool when the Gambit material had been exhausted and Deadpool was introduced as a replacement in 2004. Marvel Heroes Reborn was released in 1997, to introduce the new Heroes Reborn saga, and expand the range of characters in Marvel UK's lineup. It was initially published with only two strips (or 56 pages) but this was expanded to 76 pages (commonly 3 strips) from issue 17 onwards. This title was short-lived due to continuously lagging sales, and was eventually cancelled in 2000.

Later titles include Avengers United (later replaced by Avengers Unconquered), Fantastic Four Adventures, Marvel Legends featuring Captain America, Iron Man and Thor, a new The Mighty World of Marvel as well as the introduction of the Ultimate Marvel imprint, consisting of Ultimate Spider-Man and X-Men (which was originally two titles, which merged since it was reprinting the stories too fast for Marvel US to print them) and Ultimate Fantastic Four (cancelled because of low sales, and because it was only a few issues behind the US title by the end).

In March 2006, Marvel Entertainment and Panini S.p.A. announced that they had "renewed and expanded their publishing agreement under which Panini retains a master license for producing translated versions of Marvel comics for Europe and selected Latin American countries. The new agreement includes a major expansion of editorial projects in which Panini will originate new content under the creative supervision of Marvel." This made them the "master license holder" for Europe and parts of Latin American and lead to the development of non-English language titles with Marvel, including Wolverine: Saudade, by Jean-David Morvan and Philippe Buchet, and Daredevil & Captain America: Dead On Arrival, by Tito Faraci and Claudio Villa.

==== Other titles ====
Alongside these mainly reprint titles, Panini continues to print Doctor Who Magazine which still features originally produced comics by British creators. This includes the first new Captain Britain story by a British creative team in over a decade, created by Jim Alexander, Jon Haward and John Stokes for Spectacular Spider-Man (UK version) #114 published in March 2005. Also published from 2004 onwards was Marvel Rampage, which like Spectacular Spider-Man was aimed at a younger audience, and similarly featured all-new UK-originated material, this time featuring characters from all across the Marvel Universe. Several of those short stories were written by noted Spider-Man writer Roger Stern.

Panini also release their own range of trade paperbacks. These are all reprinted material from the American originals, and can be bought from their online shop. They also published a series of A.T.O.M. comics from 2006 to 2007, which followed on from their long-running Action Man series.

The UK site also has a popular forum, primarily for discussion of Panini Comics' publications and comics in general as well as promotion of British Comic Conventions. It has around 580 members and 580 posts as of August 2011. This closed down in March 2013 and a new forum was set up by its members.

The title Marvel Heroes was launched in 2008, based on the general formula of Spectacular Spider-Man, with new comic stories from creators like Scott Gray, Al Ewing and John McCrea.

== Publications ==
=== Italian publications ===
- Topolino

=== UK publications ===
- Astonishing Spider-Man
- Avengers Universe (Note: Formerly Avengers United, followed by "Avengers Unconquered" and Avengers Assemble)
- Essential X-Men
- Wolverine and Deadpool (Note: formerly Wolverine Unleashed and Wolverine and Gambit)
- Deadpool Unleashed (Note: Replaced The Incredible Hulks)
- Marvel Legends
- The Mighty World of Marvel
- Marvel Super Heroes (Note: Formerly Marvel Heroes)
- Spectacular Spider-Man Adventures (Note: A magazine aimed at younger readers)
- Scooby-Doo
- Tom and Jerry
- Monster Allergy (UK)
- Action Man (1996–2006)
- Action Man: A.T.O.M. (2006–07)
- Combo Rangers
- Digimon
- Fantastic Four Adventures
- The Incredible Hulks
- Looney Tunes Presents
- Monica's Gang
- Spider-Man and Friends
- ThunderCats (comics)
- Transformers: Armada
