= Spider-Man and Friends =

Line of Toy Biz merchandise (2003-2006)

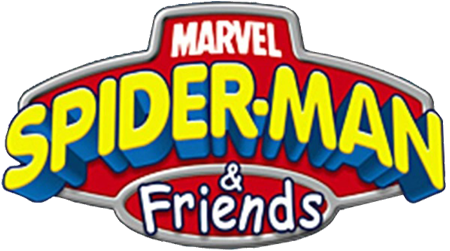
- Type: Children action figures
- Invented by: Marvel Comics
- Company: Toy Biz
- Country: United States
- Availability: 2003–06
- Materials: Plastic
- Features: Marvel Universe

Spider-Man and Friends was a line of action figures and related merchandise featuring the comic book character Spider-Man and other characters appearing in Marvel Comics publications, released by Marvel Entertainment's toy division, Toy Biz, from 2003 to 2006.

The line was aimed primarily at preschool-age children, and the character likenesses used were often altered to seem "cuter" and more childlike (and child-friendly); most characters were depicted as wide-eyed and smiling, even supervillains and characters better known for anger or savagery, such as the Incredible Hulk or Wolverine. Aside from being a toy line, there were also books, clothing, board games, cutlery, houseware, baby supplies, bedding and video games.

== Featured characters ==
=== Heroes ===
- Spider-Man
- Spider-Girl (Note: essentially a female counterpart to Spider-Man, wearing a near-identical costume; has no perceived connection to the Marvel Comics character of the same name or the various characters known as Spider-Woman. Story books under the Spider-Man and Friends brand name suggest that she is Spider-Man's cousin.)
- Wolverine (Note: some pieces of merchandise depict Wolverine in his Ultimate uniform while other merchandise depicts him in his tiger stripe costume.)
- Hulk
- Captain America
- Thor
- Cyclops
- Iron Man
- The Thing
- Mister Fantastic
- Storm
- Iceman
- Colossus
- The Beast (Note: for the most part, he is the same as the original Beast, but he is not a mutant, instead having been an ordinary boy (who appears similar to Beast's earliest appearances) who invented a potion that made him grow long blue hair.)

=== Villains ===
- Rhino
- Lizard
- Green Goblin
- Doctor Octopus

=== Promo-only characters ===
- Silver Surfer
- Aunt May
- Punisher
- Sandman
- Electro

== The end of Friends ==
The Spider-Man and Friends line ceased production at the end of 2006, when all toy licenses for Marvel Comics characters passed from Toy Biz to Hasbro; the final wave of figures was released in December 2006. Hasbro would however release a handful of products under the Spider-Man and Friends name from 2006 to 2008, such as unsold leftover Toybiz figures, singing "Itsy Bitsy Spider-Man" and "Hulkey Pokey Hulk" plush dolls, a "My First Spider-Man" action figure and some plush dolls.

=== Marvel Super Hero Squad (2007-2013) ===
Hasbro later carried over the concept of Marvel characters for the preschool set with a new line of action figures called Marvel Super Hero Squad, which debuted in January 2007. Featured characters in Wave 1 include Archangel, Colossus, Captain America, Magneto, Sabretooth, Cyclops, Wolverine, and Hawkeye. Wave 2 included Hulk, Wasp, Iron Man, Thor, Daredevil, Elektra, Punisher, and Ghost Rider. Super Hero Squad figures were much smaller than their Spider-Man and Friends predecessors, and are comparable in size and design to a similarly preschool-specific line of Star Wars toys already produced by Hasbro.

In 2009, a full-length animated series based on the toy line debuted on Cartoon Network, titled The Super Hero Squad Show. Unlike the original toy line, which was primarily aimed at preschool-aged children, the animated series targeted a broader audience of children aged 6-11. Additionally, because the television rights to Spider-Man were owned by Sony Pictures Television at the time, the character did not appear in the series, although he was featured within the franchise's video game and online adaptations.

=== Recent history (2013-present) ===
While Marvel Super Hero Squad has been discontinued as of 2013, Hasbro continued the concept of Marvel characters for the preschool set with Marvel Super Hero Adventures, which spawned its own short animated short-form series from 2017 to 2020. Disney Jr. would later follow suit with two full-length animated shows, Spidey and His Amazing Friends (2021–present) and Iron Man and His Awesome Friends (2025–present), with Hasbro handling tie-in merchandise.

Three days before the latter series premiered, on August 8, 2025, Avengers: Mightiest Friends was announced and is slated to premiere in 2027, serving as successor to Iron Man and His Awesome Friends. Two 22-minute specials were also announced that day to serve as backdoor pilots for the upcoming series. The first special, Spidey and Iron Man: Avengers Team-Up!, premiered on October 16, 2025, while the second special, Spidey and the Avengers: Halloween Team-Up!, premiered on September 24, 2026.
