= Essential X-Men =

Essential X-Men, #100 from 2003

Essential X-Men was a 76-page comic book published by Panini Comics UK, as part of their Collectors' Edition range. Beginning in 1995, the title reprinted Marvel US's range of X-Men comics; three per issue. The comic is produced on higher quality paper than the US originals, and the covers are composed of card, which helps to preserve the comic. Also unlike the US originals, advertisements are kept to a minimum, with most simply promoting the other comics in the Collectors' Edition range or Marvel DVDs or video games. The comics it reprints are generally about two years behind comics in the US. It retails at the price of £3.99.

Over the course of its 25-year history, Essential X-Men has reprinted many key events in the X-Men's history including the Age of Apocalypse and Onslaught sagas as well as more recently Grant Morrison's run. Currently it is reprinting Peter Milligan and Salvador Larroca's run on X-Men. Unlike other Collector's Editions that Panini Comics publishes, Essential X-Men rarely reprinted the classic stories. This is because in the US, the X-Men have multiple comics and in order not to fall behind the other Collector Editions in terms of continuity there is no room to print classic stories.

It was put on hold in 2020 until 2021 when it was cancelled and replaced with Marvel Universe X-Men.

== Volumes ==
=== Volume 1 ===
At the end of 2007, Essential X-Men became the title to host the House Of M event starting at issue #160 and ending with the release of issue #163 on 20 March 2008.

=== Volume 2 ===
A new volume began in January 2010 with the storyline X-Men: Divided We Stand. This volume continued to publish Volume 1 of Uncanny X-Men, as well as X-Men: Legacy. Tie-in issues to crossovers such as Secret Invasion, Utopia, Second Coming, Curse of the Mutants and Fear Itself were also featured. Following the Schism storyline, Uncanny X-Men (Vol 2) and Wolverine and the X-Men were reprinted. These volumes built up towards the Avengers vs. X-Men storyline, tying into the Avengers Assemble collector's edition. This volume finished in 2014 after 59 issues.

=== Volume 3 ===
The third volume primarily printed All-New X-Men and the third volume of Uncanny X-Men, both of which were written mainly by Brian Michael Bendis. The series also featured the story-lines Battle of the Atom, Trial of Jean Grey, then Black Vortex. Like Wolverine and Deadpool & Marvel Legends, the comic didn't reprint any Secret Wars comics. This lasted from 2014 to 2016, concluding with issue 27.

=== Volume 4 ===
The comic was relaunched as part of the All-New, All-Different Marvel event in 2016. This volume reprinted three main comics; Extraordinary X-Men, Volume 2 of All-New X-Men and Volume 4 of Uncanny X-Men. Civil War II and Inhumans vs. X-Men were also printed, along with Deadpool Unleashed. This run lasted for 22 issues, finishing in 2018.

=== Volume 5 ===
The current volume began printing in 2018. It predominantly reprinted Marc Guggenheim's X-Men: Gold and Cullen Bunn's X-Men: Blue, thus covering the Mojo Worldwide crossover that featured both teams. The first twelve issues of Astonishing X-Men (Volume 4) as well as the entirety of the crossover Phoenix Resurrection: The Return of Jean Grey, which witnessed the revival of the adult Jean Grey, were also printed. Once X-Men: Gold and X-Men: Blue concluded, Panini begun reprinting Volume 5 of Uncanny X-Men. The COVID-19 pandemic of 2020 caused the magazine to be temporarily placed on hold until it was cancelled and replaced in 2021 with Marvel Universe X-Men, which started reprinting House of X / Powers of X.
