= Wolverine and Deadpool =

UK comic book series

- Wolverine and Deadpool #104, published by Panini Comics in 2004

Publication information
- Publisher: Panini Comics
- Format: Limited series
- Publication date: 2004
- No. of issues: 1

Wolverine and Deadpool (written as Wolverine & Deadpool from volume 3 onward) is an ongoing comic book series published in the UK by Panini Comics as part of Marvel UK's 'Collectors' Edition' line. The title reprints Marvel Comics stories from the United States featuring the characters Wolverine and Deadpool.

== History ==
Initially titled Wolverine Unleashed, before becoming Wolverine and Gambit, the title was changed to Wolverine and Deadpool in 2004 with issue 104. Wolverine headlined the comic with two reprinted stories per issue, whilst a single Deadpool story was now featured in each issue in the absence of a Gambit story. During the first volume of Wolverine & Deadpool, Panini mainly reprinted Deadpool's first ongoing solo series which included Joe Kelly's and Gail Simone's respective runs. A second volume of Wolverine and Deadpool began with a new no.1 in June 2010. Under the new format, the title reprinted one issue each of Wolverine, Uncanny X-Force (which stars both Wolverine and Deadpool on the same team) and Deadpool. This ran for 60 issues, before volume 3 began in July 2014, again with a new issue 1, following the conclusion of the Final Execution Uncanny X-Force storyline. Volume 4 began in August 2016, as the title began reprinting the All-New Wolverine series as well as Deadpool's ongoing series. Volume 5 began in January 2018.

== Format ==
The title is published and is usually 76 pages, currently with one Wolverine story and two Deadpool stories per issue. From volumes 1 to 3 this ratio had been the reverse. However, this changed with in volume 4 with the debut of All-New Wolverine and the rising popularity of the Deadpool character following the 2016 movie. The cost of the comic was previously retailed at £3.50, although due to the falling value of the pound, the price was increased to £3.99 beginning with volume 4. A cheaper subscription offer is also available. The inside back page is a letters page, where readers can write letters to the editor. The page currently is titled "Mutants and Motormouths".

== Printed material ==
To date, Wolverine and Deadpool has featured material from the following US Marvel publications:

- Wolverine
- Deadpool
- Wolverine and the X-Men
- Uncanny X-Force
- The First X-Men
- The Death of Wolverine
- All-New Wolverine
- Deadpool/Captain America
- Dracula's Gauntlet
- Marvel Team-Up
- Deadpool v. Gambit
- Deadpool Team-Up
