= Fantastic Four Adventures =

Marvel UK comic

Fantastic Four Adventures #1 from 2005.

Fantastic Four Adventures was part of Marvel UK's 'Collectors' Edition' line. It was published by Panini Comics but reprints Marvel Comics from the United States. It began in 2005 around the release of the Fantastic Four film and followed the format established by the Collectors' Edition (CE) Range. Fantastic Four Adventures was sold once every 28 days through newsagents, although a subscription offer was available. Fantastic Four Adventures retailed at £2.40 upon its release, but rising in printing costs saw the price rise to £2.50 and then £2.95. It was announced at the end of 2011 that Fantastic Four Adventures would cease publication with its final issue in March 2012 to be replaced by a new CE, Incredible Hulks.

== Format ==
Fantastic Four Adventures had 76 pages including a contents page on the inside cover and a letters page on the inside back cover, named the "Fantastic Forum". It featured very few advertisements, normally 4 of the 76 pages, which is very few compared to the American comics it reprints. Most advertisements were for Marvel-related merchandise. The first issue was extended to 100 pages. The cover was made out of a thick card unlike the US comics which is made of normal glossy paper. The printing work was of high quality. Through most of its run it reprinted modern (about two years old) Fantastic Four comics as two of its three 22-page stories. The 3rd story was a 'classic' story originally printed in the 1960s: the original Fantastic Four stories by Stan Lee and Jack Kirby that established the characters from issue 1, ending with 'The Thing No More', first printed within Fantastic Four #78. No classic featured in the last issue.

== Content ==
It began by printing stories by Carlos Pacheco and the run by Mark Waid and the late Mike Wieringo, but last printed Mark Millar's and Jonathan Hickman's individual runs on Fantastic Four. It also printed the Thing miniseries Freakshow, Reed Richards Before the Fantastic Four, as well as Fantastic Four: The End. The comic magazine ended with the final arc of 'Three', the story that depicted the death of Johnny Storm, and a story entitled 'Uncles', originally printed in issue #588 of the US publication of Fantastic Four.

Readers were unable to read the tales by Hickman depicting the aftermath of Johnny Storm's death which results in the formation of the FF featuring Spider-man, or The Human Torch's return, due to the cancellation of the publication. However, the Spider-man arc entitled 'Fantastic Voyage' featured in 'Astonishing Spider-man' #67-68, also published by Panini.
